= Islam in the United States =

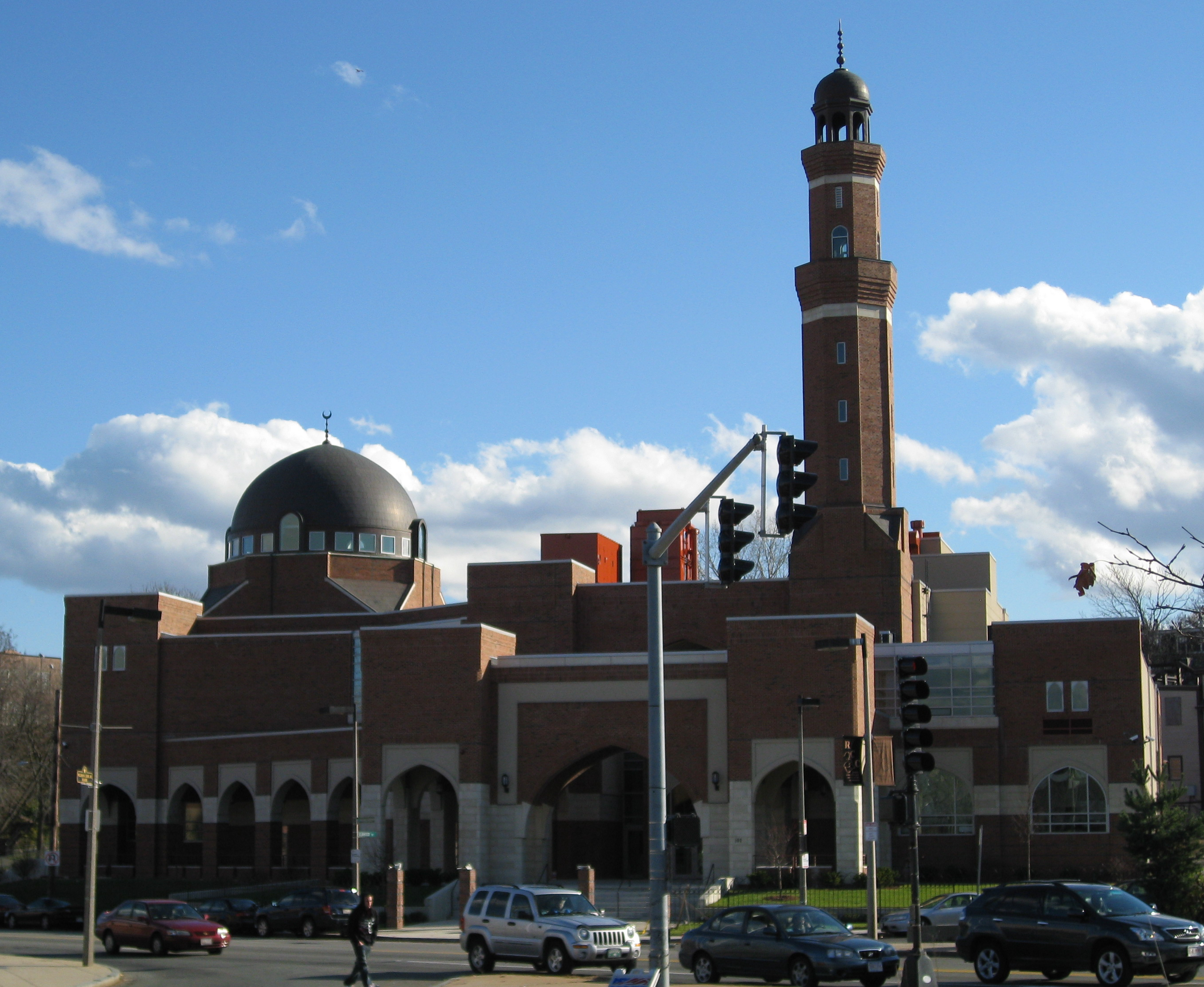
- Islamic Society of Boston mosque in Roxbury

Total population
- ▲5,500,000 (2026 estimate) ▲ (1.6% of the total U.S. population)

Regions with significant populations
- (New York (state)) New York: 724,475
- California: 504,056
- Illinois: 473,792
- New Jersey: 321,652
- Michigan: 241,828
- Maryland: 188,914
- Virginia: 169,371

Religions
- Sunni Islam Shia Islam

Languages
- English

Islam is the third-largest religion in the United States (1.6%) after Christianity (67%) and Judaism (2.4%). Pew Research Center estimates that there are about 5.5 million Muslims of all ages living in the United States in 2026, making up roughly 1.6% of the total U.S. population. In 2017, twenty states, mostly in the South and Midwest, reported Islam to be the largest non-Christian religion.

According to recent research, American Muslims exhibit comparatively high levels of social integration and civic involvement when compared to Muslim populations in many other Western nations. According to studies, Muslim Americans actively engage in public life, including work, education, and community organizations, and they express a strong sense of affiliation with the United States. This pattern has been attributed to the varied ethnic makeup of the Muslim minority in the US and the larger background of religious plurality in American society.

From the 1880s to 1914, several thousand Muslims immigrated to the United States from the former territories of the Ottoman Empire and British India. The Muslim population of the U.S. increased dramatically in the second half of the 20th century due to the passage of the Immigration and Nationality Act of 1965, which abolished previous immigration quotas. About 72 percent of American Muslims are "second generation". In 2005, more people from Muslim-majority countries became legal permanent United States residents—nearly 96,000—than there had been in any other year in the previous two decades. In 2009, more than 115,000 Muslims became legal residents of the United States.

American Muslims come from various backgrounds and, according to a 2009 Gallup poll, are one of the most racially diverse religious groups in the United States. According to a 2017 study done by the Institute for Social Policy, "American Muslims are the only faith community surveyed with no majority race, with 26 percent white, 18 percent Asian, 18 percent Arab, 9 percent black, 7 percent mixed race, and 5 percent Hispanic". The Pew Research Center estimates about 73% of American Muslims are Sunni and 16% are Shia; the remainder identify with neither group, and include movements such as the Nation of Islam, Ahmadiyya, or non-denominational Muslims. (Note: In the section "Subgroups of American Muslims", the same research institute suggests 55% are Sunni "According to the Pew Research Center, approximately 55% of Muslims in the United States are Sunni Muslims".) Conversion to Islam in large cities and in prisons have also contributed to its growth over the years.

== History ==
=== Historical overview ===
Islam in the United States can be traced back to the 16th century when slaves from Western and Central Africa were brought to the United States of America, significant minority of whom (15%–30%) were Muslim. These slaves tried to maintain their Islamic religious practices after their arrival, but were forcibly converted to Christianity. Some enslaved Muslims managed to preserve their religious practices. In the mid-17th century, Ottoman Muslims are documented to have immigrated with other European immigrants, such as Anthony Janszoon van Salee, a merchant of mixed origin from Morocco. Immigration drastically increased from 1878 to 1924 when Muslims from the Balkans, and Syria settled especially in the Midwestern United States. During that era, the Ford Motor Company employed Muslims as well as African-Americans, since they were the most inclined to work in its factories under demanding conditions. By the 1930s and 1940s, Muslims in the US built mosques for their communal religious observance. As of the early 21st century, the number of Muslims in the United States is estimated at 3.5 to 4.5 million, and Islam is predicted to eventually become the second-largest religion in the US.

=== Early records ===
One of the earliest accounts of Islam's possible presence in North America dates to 1528, when a Moroccan slave, called Esteban de Dorantes, was shipwrecked near what is now Galveston, Texas. In what became known as the Narváez expedition, he and three Spanish survivors subsequently traveled through much of the American southwest and the Mexican interior before reaching Mexico City.

Historian Peter Manseau wrote:

Muslims' presence [in the United States] is affirmed in documents dated more than a century before religious liberty became the law of the land, as in a Virginia statute of 1682 which referred to "negroes, moores, molatoes, and others, born of and in heathenish, idolatrous, pagan, and Mahometan parentage and country" who "heretofore and hereafter may be purchased, procured, or otherwise obtained, as slaves."

==== American Revolution and thereafter ====
Records from the American Revolutionary War indicate that at least a few likely Muslims fought on the American side. Among the recorded names of American soldiers are "Yusuf ben Ali" (a member of the Turks of South Carolina community), "Bampett Muhamed" and possibly Peter Salem.

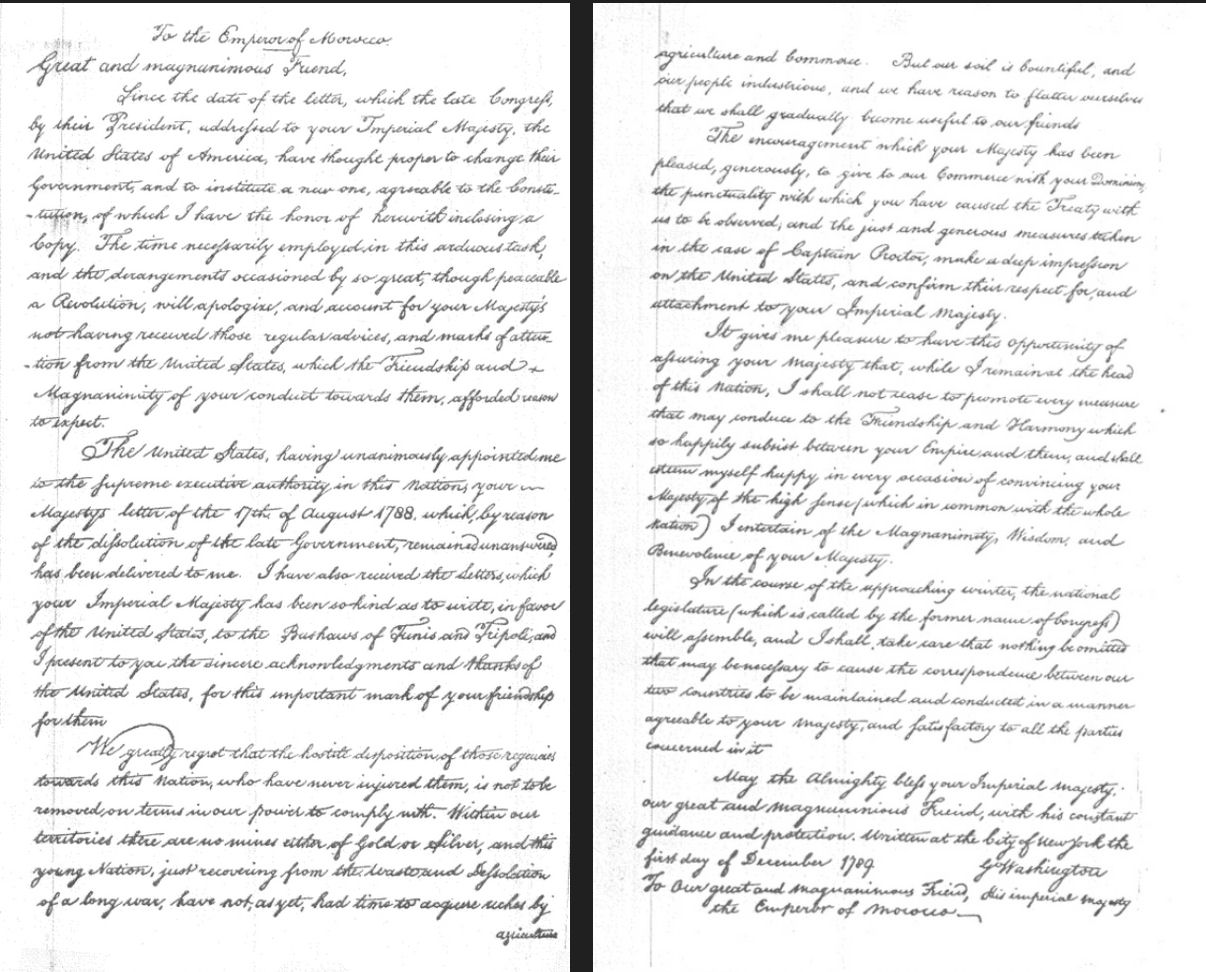
Letter of George Washington to Mohammed ben Abdallah in appreciation of the Treaty of Peace and Friendship, signed in 1787.

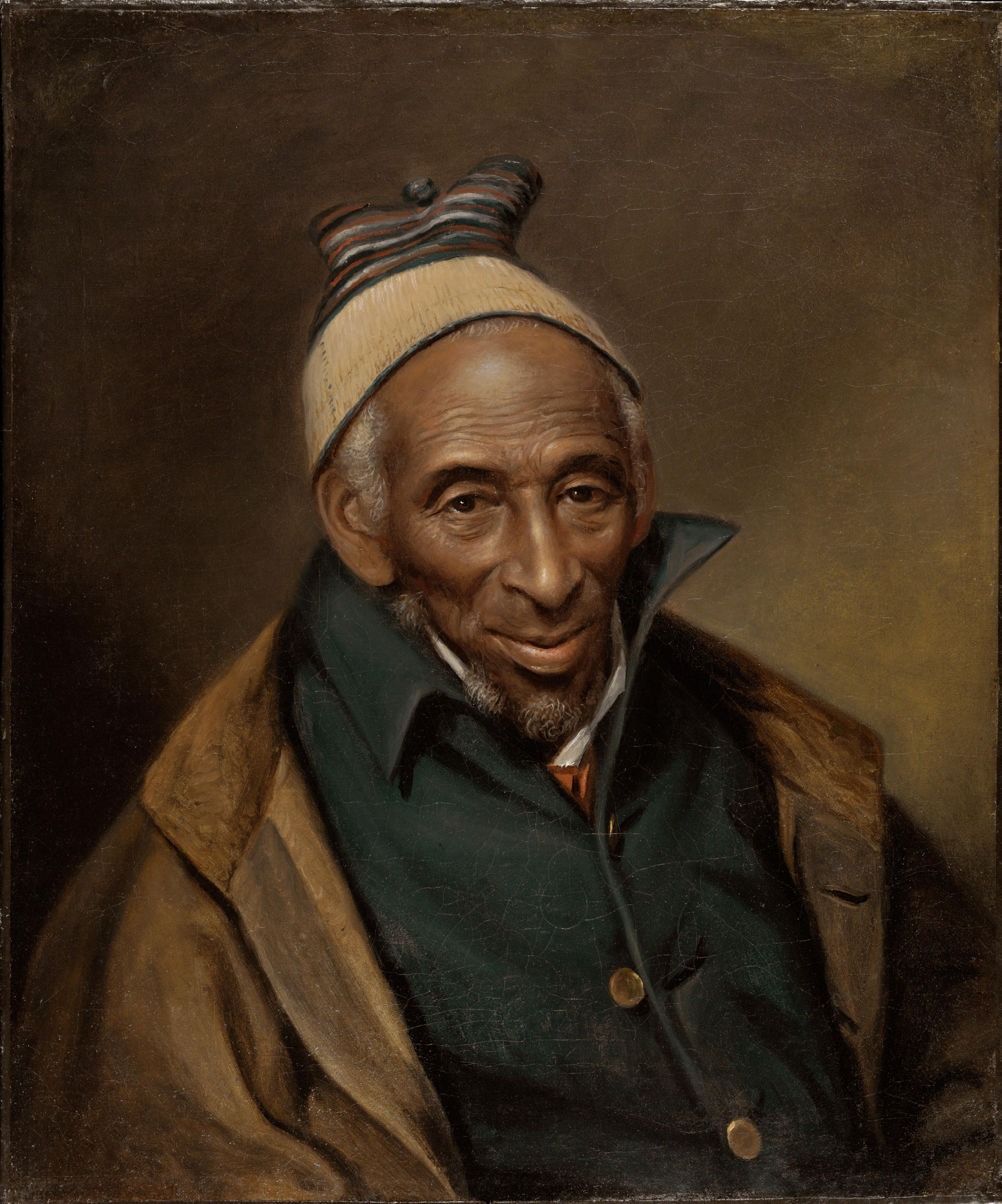
Yarrow Mamout (Muhammad Yaro), 1819. Portrait by Charles Willson Peale, Philadelphia Museum of Art

The first country to recognize the United States as an independent nation was the Sultanate of Morocco, under its ruler Mohammed ben Abdallah, in the year 1777. He maintained several correspondences with President George Washington. On December 9, 1805, President Thomas Jefferson hosted a dinner at the White House for his guest Sidi Soliman Mellimelli, an envoy from Tunis.

Bilali "Ben Ali" Muhammad was a Fula Muslim from Timbo, Futa-Jallon, in present-day Guinea-Conakry, who arrived at Sapelo Island during 1803. While enslaved, he became the religious leader and Imam for a slave community numbering approximately eighty Muslim men residing on his plantation. During the War of 1812, Muhammad and the eighty Muslim men under his leadership protected their master's Sapelo Island property from a British attack. He is known to have fasted during the month of Ramadan, worn a fez and kaftan, and observed the Muslim feasts, in addition to consistently performing the five obligatory prayers. In 1829, Bilali authored a thirteen-page Arabic Risala on Islamic beliefs and the rules for ablution, morning prayer, and the calls to prayer. Known as the Bilali Document, it is currently housed at the University of Georgia in Athens.

==== Nineteenth century ====
Estimates ranging from a dozen to 292 Muslims served in the Union military during the American Civil War, including Private Mohammed Kahn, who was born in Persia, raised in Afghanistan, and emigrated to the United States. The highest-ranking Muslim officer in the Union Army was Captain Moses Osman. Nicholas Said (born 1836), formerly enslaved to an Arab master, came to the United States in 1860 and found a teaching job in Detroit. In 1863, Said enlisted in the 55th Massachusetts Colored Regiment in the United States Army and rose to the rank of sergeant. He was later granted a transfer to a military hospital, where he gained some knowledge of medicine. His Army records state that he died in Brownsville, Tennessee, in 1882. Another Muslim soldier from the Civil War was Max Hassan, an African who worked for the military as a porter.

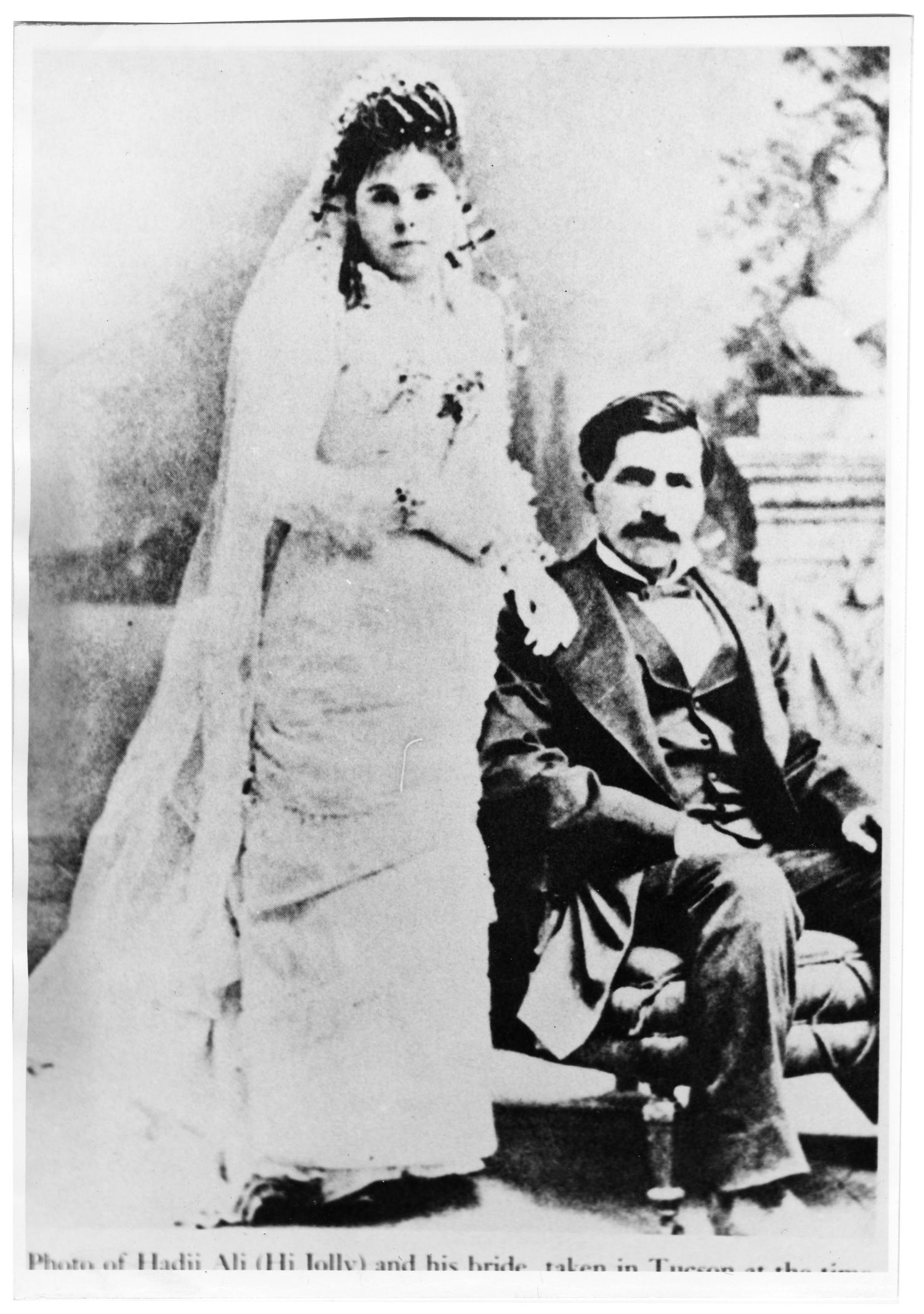
Gertrudis Serna & Hadji Ali (Hi Jolly).

A Greek/Syrian convert to Islam, Phillip Tedro (a name he reverted to later in life), born in Smyrna, who renamed himself Hajj Ali, 'Ali who made the pilgrimage to Mecca,' (commonly spelled as "Hi Jolly") was hired by the United States Cavalry in 1856 to tend camels in Arizona and California. He would later become a prospector in Arizona. Hajj Ali died in 1903.

During the American Civil War, the "scorched earth" policy of the North destroyed churches, farms, schools, libraries, colleges, and a great deal of other property. In early April 1865, (Note: Sources differ whether this was April 3, 4, or 5) when Federal troops commanded by Col. Thomas M. Johnston reached the campus of the University of Alabama with an order to destroy the university, Andre Deloffre, a modern language professor and custodian of the library, appealed to the commanding officer to spare one of the finest libraries in the South. The officer, being sympathetic, sent a courier to Brigadier General John T. Croxton at his headquarters in Tuscaloosa, Alabama asking permission to save the Rotunda, but the general refused to allow this. The officer reportedly said, "I will save one volume as a memento of this occasion." The volume selected was a rare copy of the Qur'an, titled The Koran: Commonly Called The Alcoran.

Alexander Russell Webb is considered by historians to be the earliest prominent Anglo-American convert to Islam in 1888. In 1893, he was the sole representative of Islam at the first Parliament of the World's Religions. The Russian-born Muslim scholar and writer Achmed Abdullah (1881–1945) was another prominent early American Muslim.

In the 1891 Supreme Court case In re Ross, the Court referred to “the intense hostility of the people of Muslim faith to all other sects, and particularly to Christians". Scores of Muslim immigrants were turned away at U.S. ports in the late 19th and early 20th centuries. Christian immigrants suspected of secretly being Muslims were also excluded.

=== Slaves ===
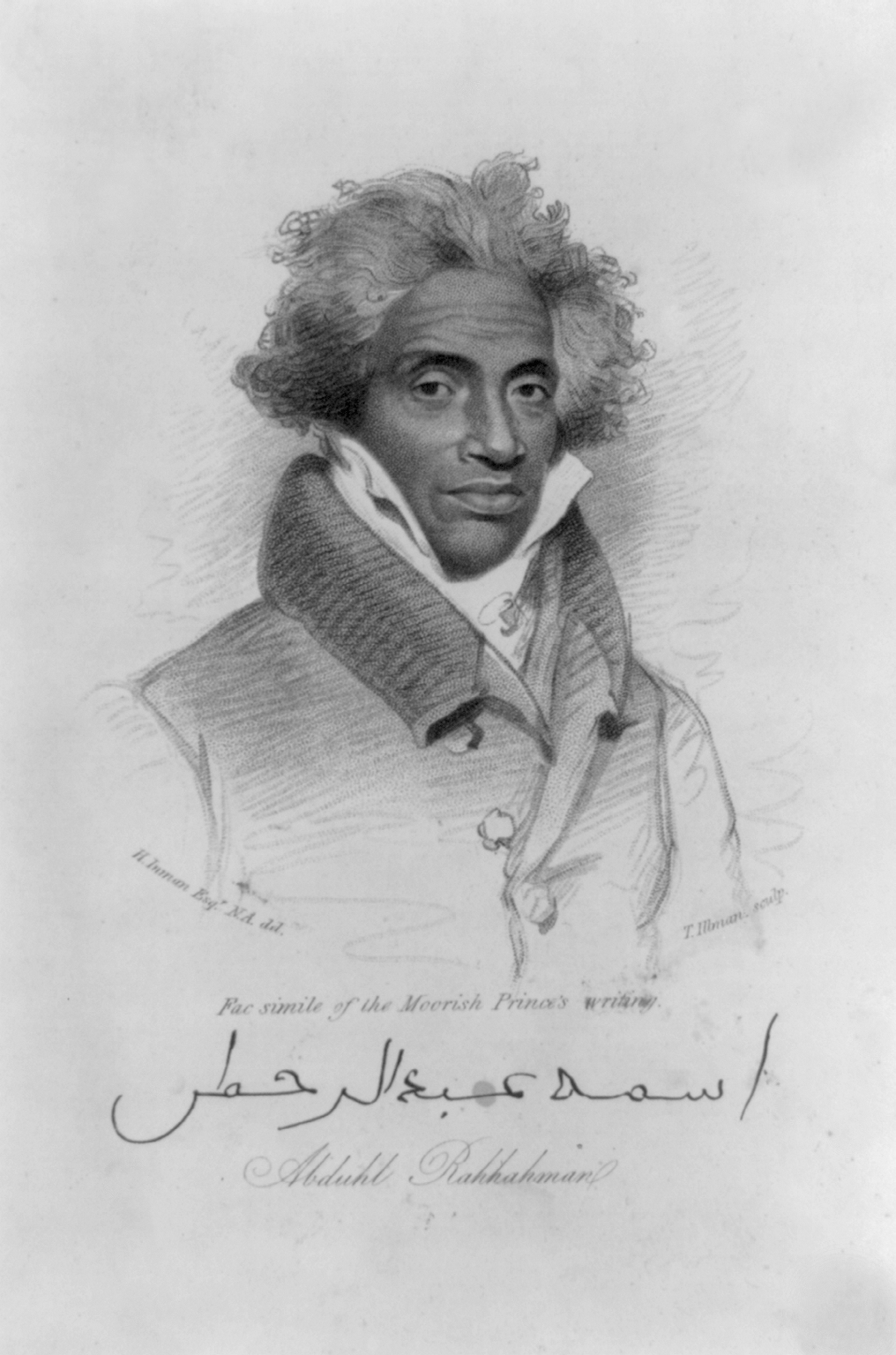
Drawing of Abdul Rahman Ibrahima Sori, who was a Muslim prince from West Africa and was captured by slave traders and transported to the United States.

Many enslaved people brought to America from Africa were Muslims from the predominantly-Muslim West African region. Between 1701 and 1800, some 500,000 Africans arrived in what became the United States. According to 21st century researchers Donna Meigs-Jaques and R. Kevin Jaques, "[t]hese enslaved Muslims stood out from their compatriots because of their resistance, determination and education."

It is estimated that over 50% of the slaves imported to North America came from areas where Islam was followed by at least a minority population. Thus, no less than 200,000 came from regions influenced by Islam. Substantial numbers originated from Senegambia, a region with an established community of Muslim inhabitants extending to the 11th century.

Through a series of conflicts, primarily with the Fulani jihad states, about half of the Senegambian Mandinka were converted to Islam, while as many as a third were sold into slavery to the Americas through capture in conflict.

Michael A. Gomez speculated that Muslim slaves may have accounted for "thousands, if not tens of thousands", but does not offer a precise estimate. He also suggests many non-Muslim slaves were acquainted with some tenets of Islam, due to Muslim trading and proselytizing activities. Historical records indicate many enslaved Muslims conversed in the Arabic language. Some even composed literature (such as autobiographies) and commentaries on the Quran.

Some newly arrived Muslim slaves assembled for communal salat (prayers). Some were provided a private praying area by their owner. The two best documented Muslim slaves were Ayuba Suleiman Diallo and Omar Ibn Said. Suleiman was brought to America in 1731 and returned to Africa in 1734. Like many Muslim slaves, he often encountered impediments when attempting to perform religious rituals and was eventually allotted a private location for prayer by his master.

Omar ibn Said (c. 1770–1864) is among the best documented examples of a practicing Muslim slave. He lived on a 19th century North Carolina plantation and wrote many Arabic texts while enslaved. Born in the kingdom of Futa Tooro (modern Senegal), he arrived in America in 1807, one month before the U.S. abolished importation of slaves. Some of his works include the Lords Prayer, the Bismillah, this is How You Pray, Quranic phases, the 23rd Psalm, and an autobiography. In 1857, he produced his last known writing on Surah 110 of the Quran. In 1819, Omar received an Arabic translation of the Christian Bible from his master, James Owen. Omar converted to Christianity in 1820, an episode widely used throughout the South to "prove" the benevolence of slavery. However, many scholars believe he continued to be a practicing Muslim, based on dedications to Muhammad written in his Bible.

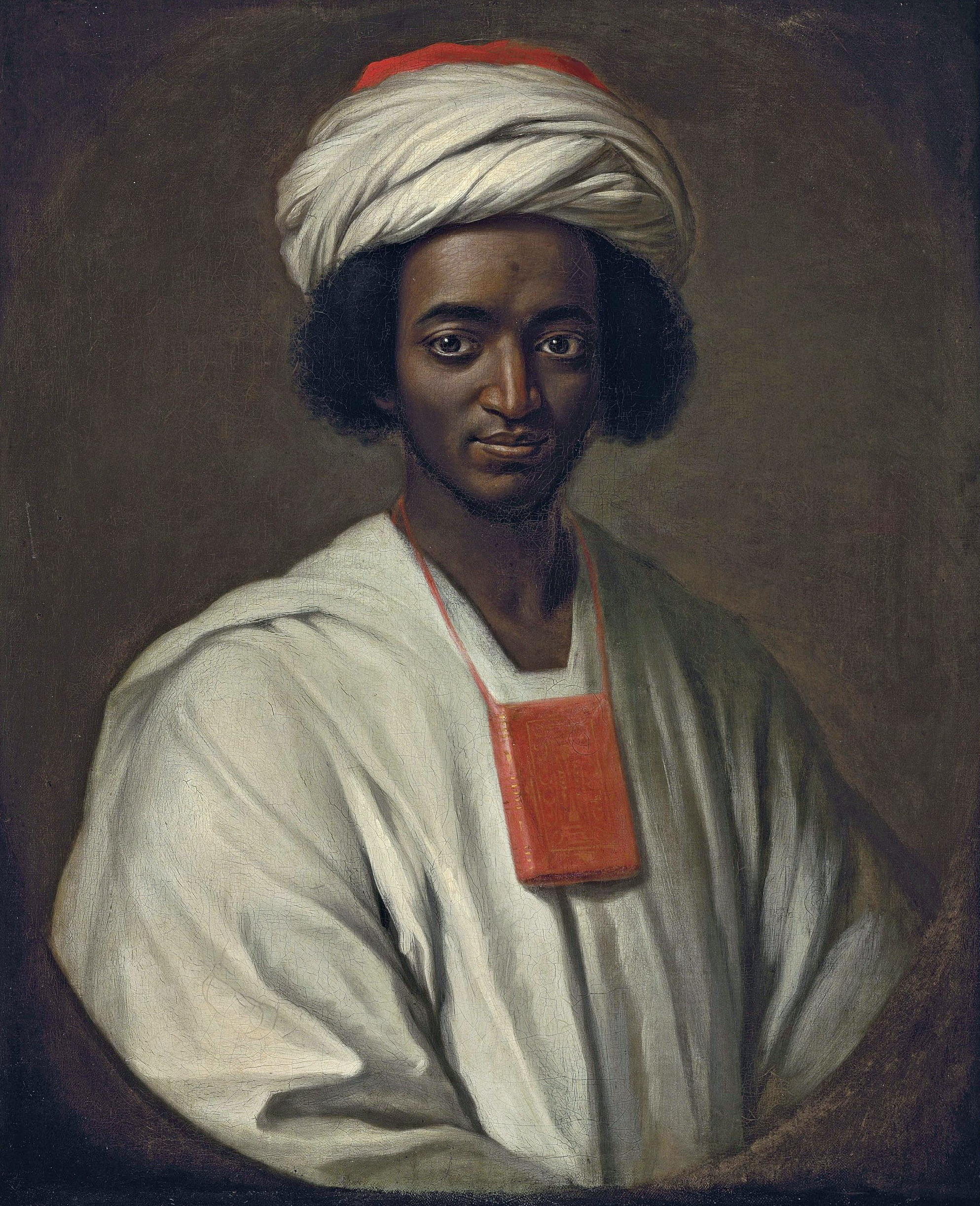
Ayuba Suleiman Diallo was the son of an Imam of Boonda in Africa, before being enslaved.

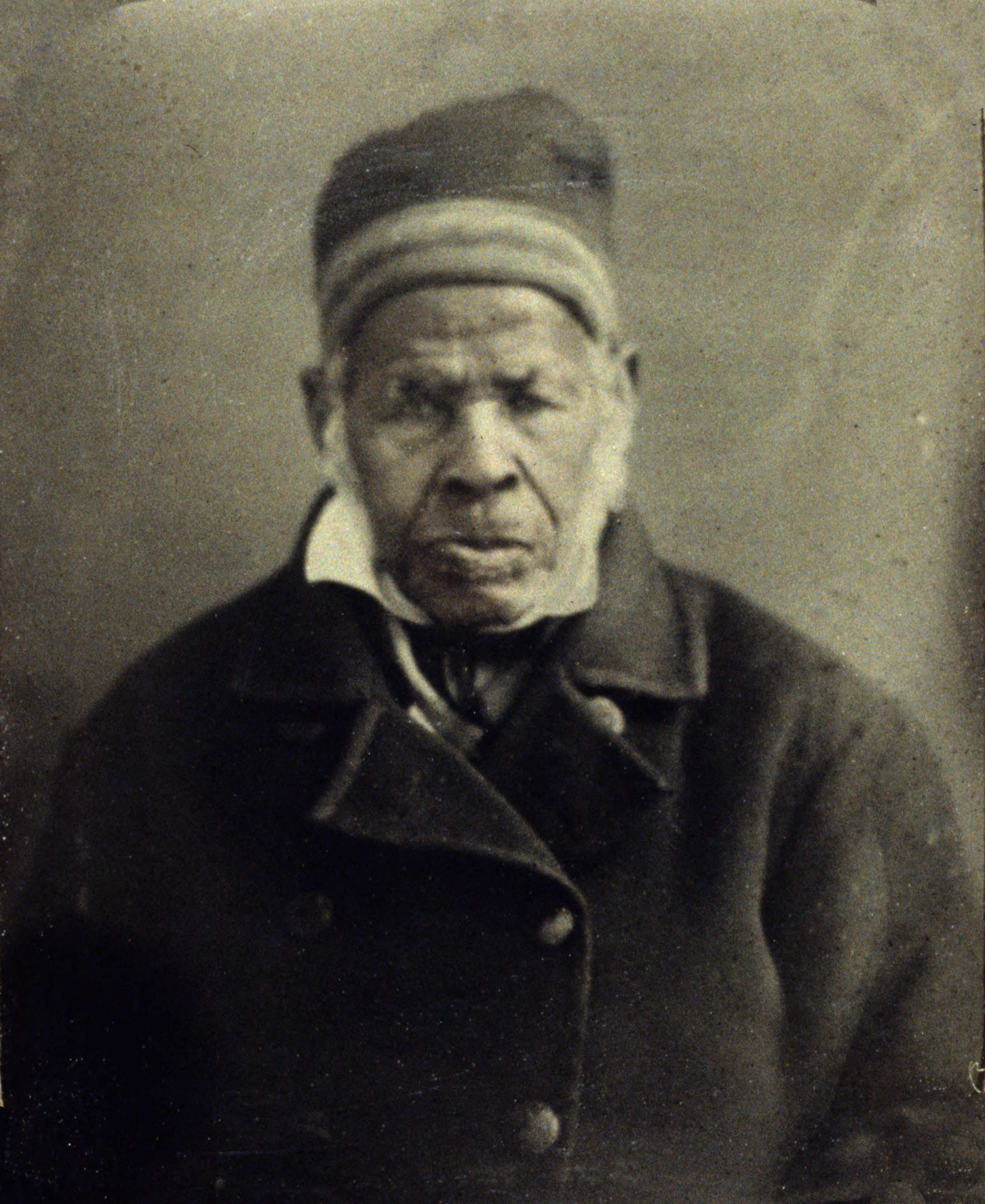
Omar Ibn Said was an Islamic scholar from Senegal.

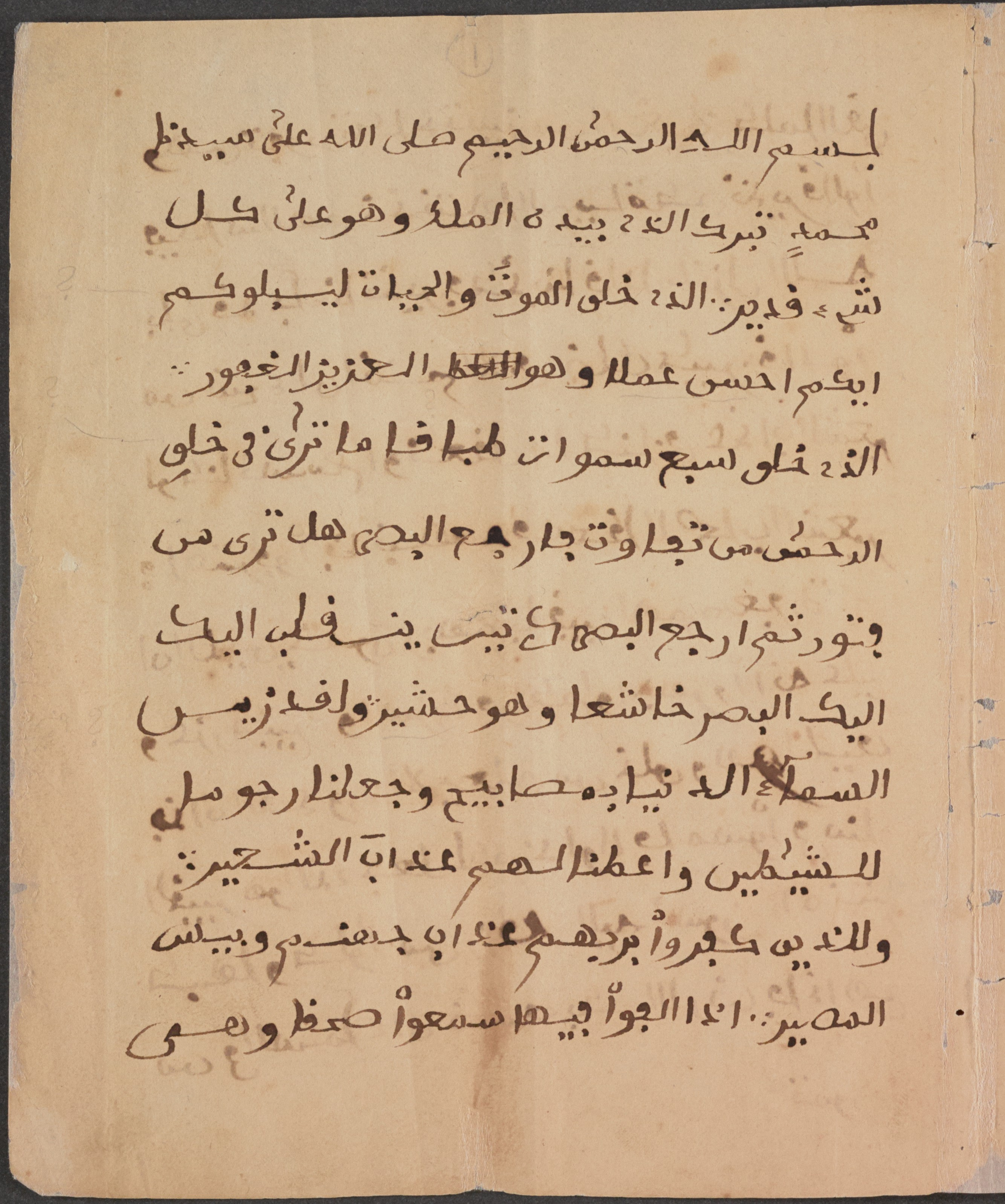
Surat Al-Mulk from the Qur'an copied by Omar ibn Said.

=== Religious freedom ===
Views of Islam in America affected debates regarding freedom of religion during the drafting of the state constitution of Pennsylvania in 1776. Constitutionalists promoted religious toleration while Anti-constitutionalists called for reliance on Protestant values in the formation of the state's republican government. The former group won out and inserted a clause for religious liberty in the new state constitution. American views of Islam were influenced by favorable Enlightenment writings from Europe, as well as Europeans who had long warned that Islam was a threat to Christianity and republicanism.

In 1776, John Adams published Thoughts on Government, in which he mentions the Islamic prophet Muhammad as a "sober inquirer after truth" alongside Confucius, Zoroaster, Socrates, and other thinkers.

In 1785, George Washington stated a willingness to hire "Mahometans", as well as people of any nation or religion, to work on his private estate at Mount Vernon if they were "good workmen".

In 1790, the South Carolina legislative body granted special legal status to a community of Moroccans (see the Moors Sundry Act).

In 1797, President John Adams signed the Treaty of Tripoli, declaring the United States had no "character of enmity against the laws, religion, or tranquillity, of Mussulmen".

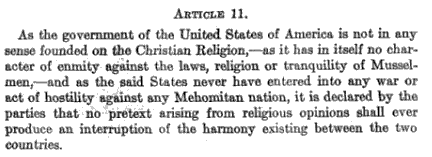
Article 11 of the English translation of the Treaty of Tripoli affirmed that the treaty "was between two sovereign states, not between two religious powers."

In his autobiography, published in 1791, Benjamin Franklin stated that he "did not disapprove" of a meeting place in Pennsylvania that was designed to accommodate preachers of all religions. Franklin wrote that "even if the Mufti of Constantinople were to send a missionary to preach Mohammedanism to us, he would find a pulpit at his service".

President Thomas Jefferson defended religious freedom in America, including those of Muslims. Jefferson explicitly mentioned Muslims when writing about the movement for religious freedom in Virginia. In his autobiography Jefferson wrote "[When] the [Virginia] bill for establishing religious freedom ... was finally passed, ... a singular proposition proved that its protection of opinion was meant to be universal. Where the preamble declares that coercion is a departure from the plan of the holy author of our religion, an amendment was proposed, by inserting the word 'Jesus Christ', so that it should read 'a departure from the plan of Jesus Christ, the holy author of our religion'. The insertion was rejected by a great majority, in proof that they meant to comprehend within the mantle of its protection the Jew and the Gentile, the Christian and Mahometan, the Hindoo and infidel of every denomination." While President, Jefferson also participated in an iftar with the Ambassador of Tunisia in 1809.

However, not all politicians were pleased with the religious neutrality of the Constitution, which prohibited any religious test. Anti-Federalists in the 1788 North Carolina ratifying convention opposed the new constitution; one reason was the fear that some day Catholics or Muslims might be elected president. William Lancaster said:

Let us remember that we form a government for millions not yet in existence ... In the course of four or five hundred years, I do not know how it will work. This is most certain, that Papists may occupy that chair, and Mahometans may take it. I see nothing against it.

In 1788, Americans held inaccurate, and often contradicting, views of the Muslim world, and used that in political arguments. For example, the anti-Federalists compared a strong central government to the Sultan of the Ottoman Empire and the American army to Turkish Janissaries, arguing against a strong central government. On the other hand, Alexander Hamilton argued that despotism in the Middle East was the result of the Sultan not having enough power to protect his people from oppressive local governors; thus he argued for a stronger central government.

=== 20th century ===
==== Modern Muslims ====
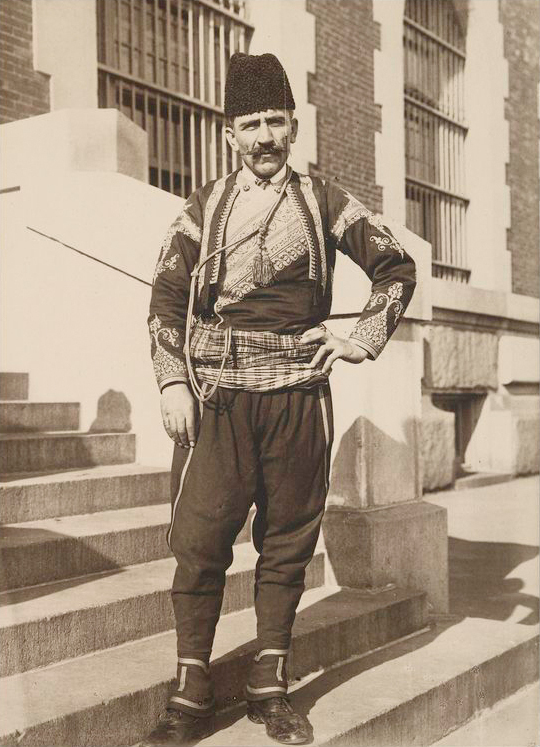
Turkish immigrant in New York (1912)

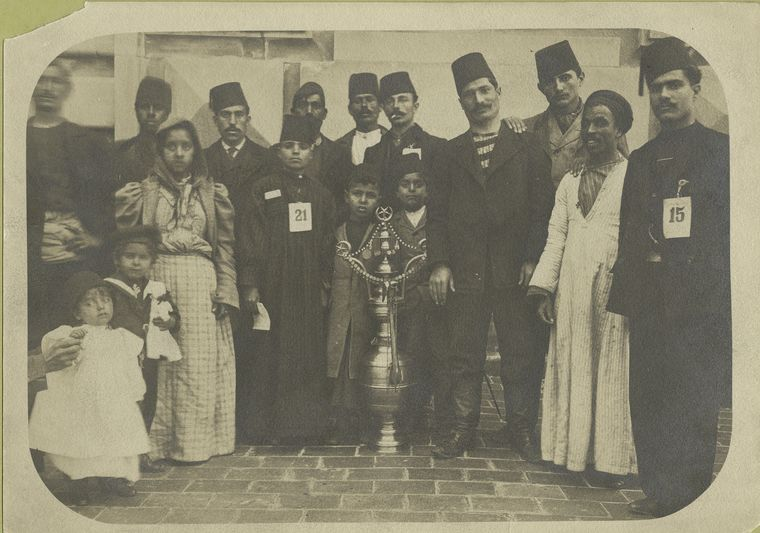
A group of immigrants, most wearing fezzes, surrounding a large vessel which is decorated with the star and crescent symbol of Islam and the Ottoman Turks (1902–1913)

Small-scale migration to the U.S. by Muslims began in 1840, with the arrival of Yemenis and Turks, and lasted until World War I. Most of the immigrants, from Arab areas of the Ottoman Empire, came with the purpose of making money and returning to their homeland. However, the economic hardships of 19th-century America prevented them from prospering, and as a result the immigrants settled in the United States permanently. These immigrants settled primarily in Dearborn, Michigan; Paterson, New Jersey; Quincy, Massachusetts; and Ross, North Dakota. Ross, North Dakota is the site of the first documented mosque and Muslim Cemetery, but it was abandoned and later torn down in the mid-1970s. A new mosque was built in its place in 2005. Construction of mosques sped up in the 1920s and 1930s, and by 1952, there were over 20 mosques. Although the first mosque was established in the U.S. in 1915, relatively few mosques were founded before the 1960s.

- 1893: Alexander Russell Webb starts the first Islamic Mission in the United States called the American Muslim Propagation Movement.
- 1906: Bosniaks (Bosnian Muslims) in Chicago, Illinois, started the Džemijetul Hajrije (Jamaat al-Khayriyya) (The Benevolent Society; a social service organization devoted to Bosnian Muslims). This is the longest lasting incorporated Muslim community in the United States. They met in Bosnian coffeehouses and eventually opened the first Islamic Sunday School with curriculum and textbooks under Bosnian scholar Sheikh Kamil Avdich (Ćamil Avdić) (a graduate of al-Azhar and author of Survey of Islamic Doctrines).
- 1907: Lipka Tatar immigrants from the Podlasie region of Poland founded the first Muslim organization in New York City, the American Mohammedan Society which became the Powers Street Mosque. In 2017 they celebrated the 110th anniversary of their establishment.
- 1915: What is most likely the first American mosque was founded by Albanian Muslims in Biddeford, Maine. A Muslim cemetery still exists there.
- 1920: The Ahmadiyya Muslim Community was established by the arrival of Mufti Muhammad Sadiq, an Indian Ahmadi Muslim missionary, he later purchased a building in south Chicago and converted it to what is today known as the Al-Sadiq Mosque which was rebuilt as purpose-built mosque in 1990s.
- 1921: The Highland Park Mosque was built in Highland Park, Michigan, although closed a few years later.
- 1929: A mosque was built in Ross, North Dakota, founded by Syrian Muslims; there is still a cemetery nearby.
- 1934: The oldest continuously and still standing building built specifically to be a mosque was established in Cedar Rapids, Iowa. The mosque is where Abdullah Igram a notable Muslim veteran would teach the Quran, Abdullah Igram later wrote a letter to President Eisenhower persuading him to add the M option (for Muslims) on military dog tags.
- 1935: The statue of Mohammed was drawn on the north wall of the US Supreme Court building in 1935. Also, statues of Charlemagne and Justinian as one of eighteen great law givers of history are seen around the statue of Mohammed.
- 1945: A mosque existed in Dearborn, Michigan, home to the largest Arab-American population in the U.S.

"Since the 1950s," many notable political activists and socialites with influence over politicians have come from the American Muslim community.

The Muslim population of the U.S. increased dramatically after President Lyndon B. Johnson signed the Immigration and Nationality Act of 1965 into law. The act abolished former immigration quotas, and expanded immigration opportunities from countries with significant Muslim populations.

The Xoraxaya, Muslim Roma from Northern Macedonia, also came to the US, where they founded mainly in the Bronx two Mosques.

Approximately 2.78 million people immigrated to the United States from countries with significant Muslim populations between 1966 and 1997, with some estimating 1.1 million people of that population being Muslims. One-third of those immigrants originated from North Africa or the Middle East, one-third originated from South Asian countries, with the remaining third originating from across the entire world. Immigration to the United States post-1965 favored those deemed to have specialized educational and skills, thus impacting the socio-economic makeup of American Muslims. The United States began seeing Muslim immigrants arrive in the late 20th century as refugees due to such reasons as political unrest, war, and famine.

== Subgroups of Muslim Americans ==
According to the Pew Research Center, approximately 55% of Muslims in the United States are Sunni Muslims, with Shia Muslims representing roughly 16% of the American Muslim population of which there are also sub-sects within the Shia Muslim denomination such as Nizar'i Ismailism, Bohras, etc. The remainder identify with neither group, including some who consider themselves to be non-denominational Muslims.

=== Black Muslim movements ===
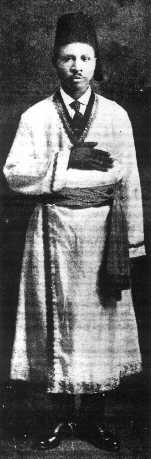
Noble Drew Ali

During the first half of the 20th century, several groups based on Islamic and Gnostic teachings combined with pseudohistorical colonial beliefs were established by African Americans.

==== Moorish Science Temple of America ====
The Moorish Science Temple of America is an American organization founded in 1913 by Noble Drew Ali, making it the oldest Islamic organization in the United States. Drew taught that black people were of Moorish origin but their Muslim identity was taken away through slavery and racial segregation, advocating the return to Islam of their Moorish ancestry. The founder stated that the organization practiced the "Old Time Religion" of Islamism, but he also drew inspiration from Mohammedanism, Buddhism, Christianity, Gnosticism, and Taoism. Its significant divergences from mainstream Islam make its classification as an Islamic denomination a matter of debate among Muslims and scholars of religion.

Its primary tenet was the belief that they are the ancient Moabites who inhabited the Northwestern and Southwestern shores of Africa. The organization also believes that their descendants after being conquered in Spain are slaves who were captured and held in slavery from 1779 to 1865 by their slaveholders.

Adherents of the Moorish Science Temple of America believe that the so-called "Asiatics" were the first human inhabitant of the Western Hemisphere. In their religious texts members refer to themselves as "Asiatics", within the teachings of Noble Drew Ali, the members are taught man cannot be a Negro, Colored Folk, Black people, Ethiopians, because these names were given to slaves by slave holders in 1779 and lasted until 1865 during the time of slavery.

The Moorish Science Temple of America's current leader is R. Jones-Bey.

==== Nation of Islam ====
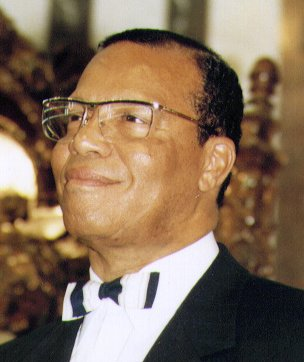
Louis Farrakhan, leader of the Nation of Islam since 1981

The Nation of Islam (NOI) was created in 1930 by Wallace Fard Muhammad. Fard drew inspiration for NOI doctrines from those of Timothy Drew's Moorish Science Temple of America. He provided three main principles which serve as the foundation of the NOI: "Allah is God, the white man is the devil and the so-called Negroes are the Asiatic Black People, the cream of the planet earth".

In 1934, Elijah Muhammad became the leader of the NOI, he deified Fard, saying that he was an incarnation of God, and taught that he was a prophet who had been taught directly by God in the form of Fard. Two of the most famous people to join the NOI were Malcolm X, who became the face of the NOI in the media, and Muhammad Ali, who, while initially rejected, was accepted into the group shortly after his first world heavyweight championship victory. Both Malcolm X and Ali later became Sunni Muslims.

Malcolm X was one of the most influential leaders of the NOI and, in accordance with NOI doctrine, advocated the complete separation of blacks from whites. He left the NOI after being silenced for 90 days (due to a controversial comment on the John F. Kennedy assassination), and proceeded to form Muslim Mosque, Inc. and the Organization of Afro-American Unity before his pilgrimage to Mecca and conversion to Sunni Islam. He is viewed as the first person to start the movement among African-Americans towards Sunni Islam.

It was estimated that there were at least 20,000 members in 2006. However, today the group has a wide influence in the African-American community. The first Million Man March took place in Washington, D.C. in 1995 and was followed later by another one in 2000 which was smaller in size but more inclusive, welcoming individuals other than just African-American men. The group sponsors cultural and academic education, economic independence, and personal and social responsibility.

The Nation of Islam has received a great deal of criticism for its anti-white, anti-Christian, and anti-semitic teachings, and is listed as a hate group by the Southern Poverty Law Center.

===== Five-Percent Nation =====
The Five-Percent Nation, sometimes referred to as NGE or NOGE, the Nation of Gods and Earths, or the Five Percenters, is an American organization founded in 1964 in the Harlem section of the borough of Manhattan, New York City, by a former member of the Nation of Islam named Clarence 13X (born Clarence Edward Smith and later known as "Allah the Father"). Clarence 13X, a former student of Malcolm X, left the Nation of Islam after a theological dispute with the Nation's leaders over the nature and identity of God. Specifically, Clarence 13X denied that the Nation's biracial founder Wallace Fard Muhammad was Allah and instead taught that the Black man was himself God personified.

Members of the group call themselves Allah's Five Percenters, which reflects the concept that ten percent of the people in the world know the truth of existence, and those elites and agents opt to keep eighty-five percent of the world in ignorance and under their controlling thumb; the remaining five percent are those who know the truth and are determined to enlighten the rest.

===== United Nation of Islam =====
The United Nation of Islam (UNOI) is a group based in Kansas City, Kansas. It was founded circa 1978 by Royall Jenkins, who continues to be the leader of the group and styles himself "Royall, Allah in Person".

===== Conversion to orthodox Sunni Islam =====
After the death of Elijah Muhammad, he was succeeded by his son, Warith Deen Mohammed. Mohammed rejected many teachings of his father, such as the divinity of Fard Muhammad, and saw a white person as also a worshiper. As he took control of the organization, he quickly brought in new reforms. He renamed it the World Community of al-Islam in the West; later it became the American Society of Muslims. It was estimated that there were 200,000 followers of W. D. Mohammed at the time.

W. D. Mohammed introduced teachings which were based on orthodox Sunni Islam. He removed the chairs in the organization's temples, and replaced the entire "temple" concept with the traditional Muslim house of worship, the mosque, also teaching how to pray the salat, to observe the fasting of Ramadan, and to attend the pilgrimage to Mecca.

A small number of Black Muslims however rejected these new reforms brought by Imam Mohammed. Louis Farrakhan, who broke away from the organization, re-established the Nation of Islam under the original Fardian doctrines, and remains its leader.

=== Shia Islam ===
An estimated 386,000 to 900,000 Shia Muslims live in the United States. They originate from South Asia, Europe, Middle East, and East Africa; and are often from the countries of: Islamic Republic of Pakistan, India, Islamic Republic of Iran, Lebanon, Iraq, Afghanistan, Syria, Yemen, East Africa, and the Americas as converts; Shiites in the United States also make up about 16 percent of the country's total Muslim population.

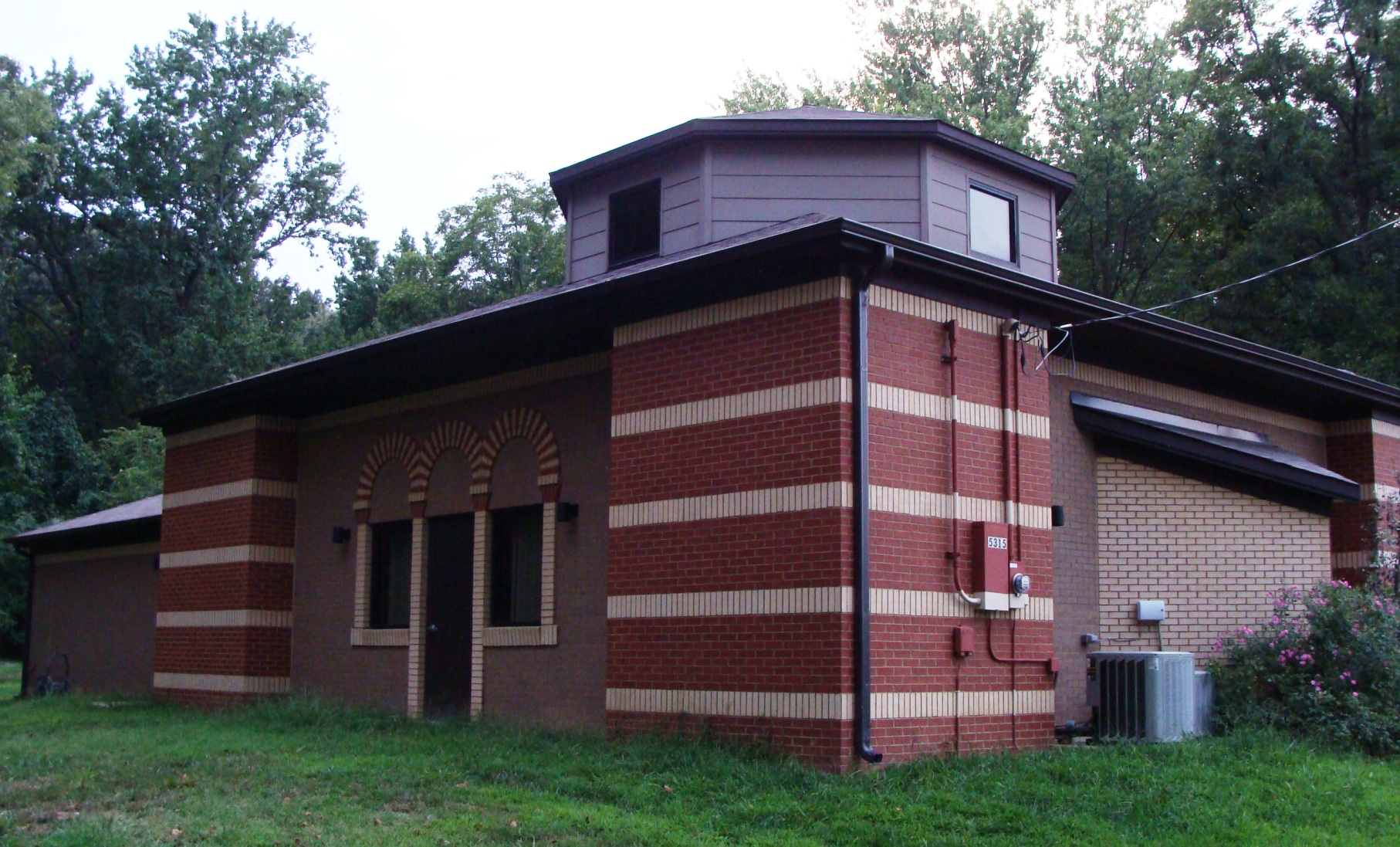
Memphis Al-Rasool Mosque, a Shia mosque in Memphis, Tennessee, United States

The "heart of Shiism in the U.S." is placed in Dearborn, home to the Islamic Center of America. The North American Shia Ithna-Asheri (Twelver Shi'ism) Muslim Communities Organization (NASIMCO) is the largest umbrella group for North American Shias.

=== Sufism ===
Some Muslim Americans adhere to the doctrines of Sufism. Hamza Yusuf, the president and co-founder of Zaytuna College, is a voice for Sufi traditional thought in the United States.

=== Quranic movement ===
The largest Quranist movement in the United States is the United Submitters International. This movement was founded by Rashad Khalifa. His movement popularized the phrase: "The Qur'an, the whole Qur'an, and nothing but the Qur'an". Although he was initially well received by many, his subsequent claims of divine inspiration caused friction between him and others, and he was assassinated in 1990. Notable Americans influenced by Rashad Khalifa include his son, Sam Khalifa, a retired professional baseball player, and Ahmad Rashad, a sportscaster and retired football player.

=== Non-denominational Muslims ===
Research by Pew in 2011 found that Non-denominational Muslims make up roughly one in seven of all American Muslims, at 15%. Non-denominational Muslims, do not have any specific affiliation with a religious body and usually describe themselves as being "just a Muslim". Muslims who were born in the US are more likely to be non-denominational than immigrant Muslims. 24% or one in four US-born Muslims are non-denominational, versus 10% of immigrant Muslims.

=== Ahmadiyya ===
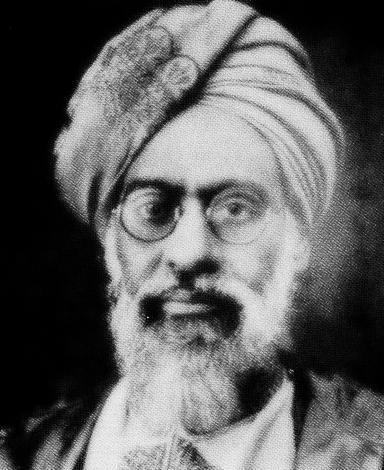
Mufti Muhammad Sadiq, first missionary and an Ahmadi.

The Ahmadiyya Community was established in 1920 in the United States. Ahmadi Muslims were among the earliest Muslim missionaries in America, the first being Mufti Muhammad Sadiq, who arrived in America on February 15, 1920, and between 1921 and 1925 alone they converted over 1000 people to Islam. Although at first their efforts were broadly concentrated over a large number of racial and ethnic groups, subsequent realization of the deep-seated racial tensions and discrimination made Ahmadi missionaries focus their attention on mainly African Americans and the Muslim immigrant community and became vocal proponents of the civil rights movement. Officially incorporated in Illinois in 1948 as the Ahmadiyya Movement In Islam, Inc. and commonly referred to as the Ahmadiyya Muslim Community since 2006(?). Many Ahmadi Muslims fled countries like Pakistan due to persecution in recent times.

=== Other Muslims ===
There are some mosquegoers who adhere to sects and denominations that form very small minorities. Examples of such small branches include progressive Muslims, Mahdavi Muslims, Ibadi Muslims, and Ismaili Muslims.

== Conversion to Islam ==
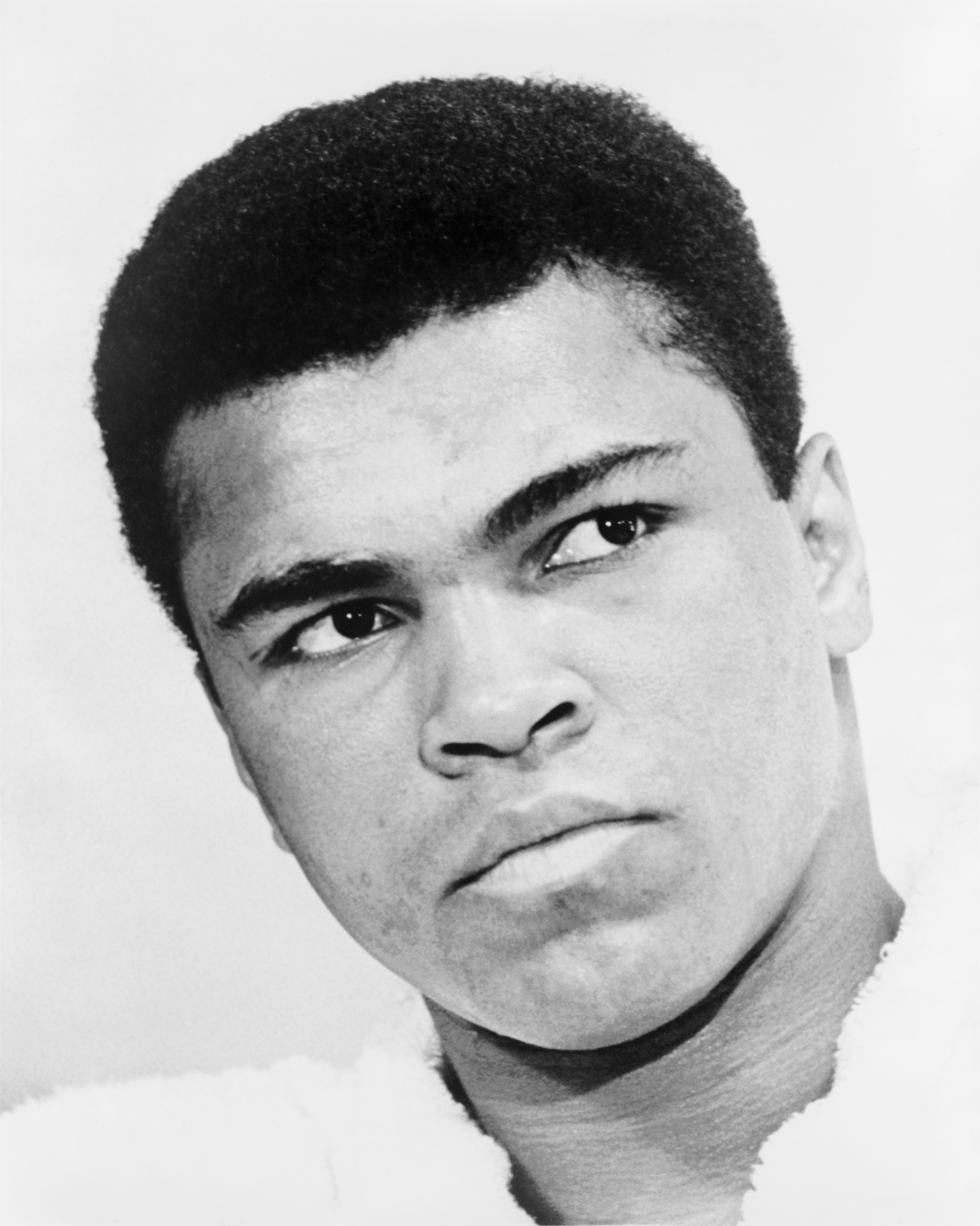
Muhammad Ali converted to Islam in 1964

Some of the earliest Islamic missionary activities were undertaken by Alexander Russell Webb, who in 1893 established a mission in Manhattan, although it faltered due to lack of funding. From 1910 to 1912, Inayat Khan toured major American cities preaching Islam; he attracted large audiences though not as many converts. More successful in converting Americans to Islam was Mufti Muhammad Sadiq, who established a mission in Chicago in 1920. The converts Sadiq attracted tended to be African American. Soon after, African-American Muslim groups began to form: the Moorish Science Temple was established in Chicago in 1925, and the Nation of Islam formed in 1930.

According to an article in 2001, 25,000 Americans convert to Islam per year.

In more recent years, there has been significant conversion to Islam in the state, federal, and local prisons of the United States. According to J. Michael Waller, Muslim inmates constitute 15–20% of the prison population, or roughly 350,000 inmates in 2003. Waller states that these inmates mostly come into prison as non-Muslims. He also says that 80% of the prisoners who "find faith" while in prison convert to Islam. These converted inmates are mostly African American, with a small but growing Hispanic minority.

Since the start of the Gaza War in 2023, there has been an increase in Americans who have converted to Islam.

== Demographics ==
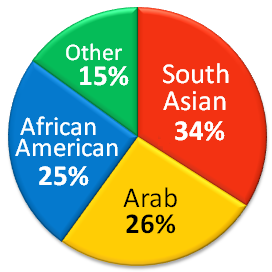
According to the U.S. Department of State (2009), the largest ethnic groups of American Muslims are those of South Asian, Arab and African-American descent.

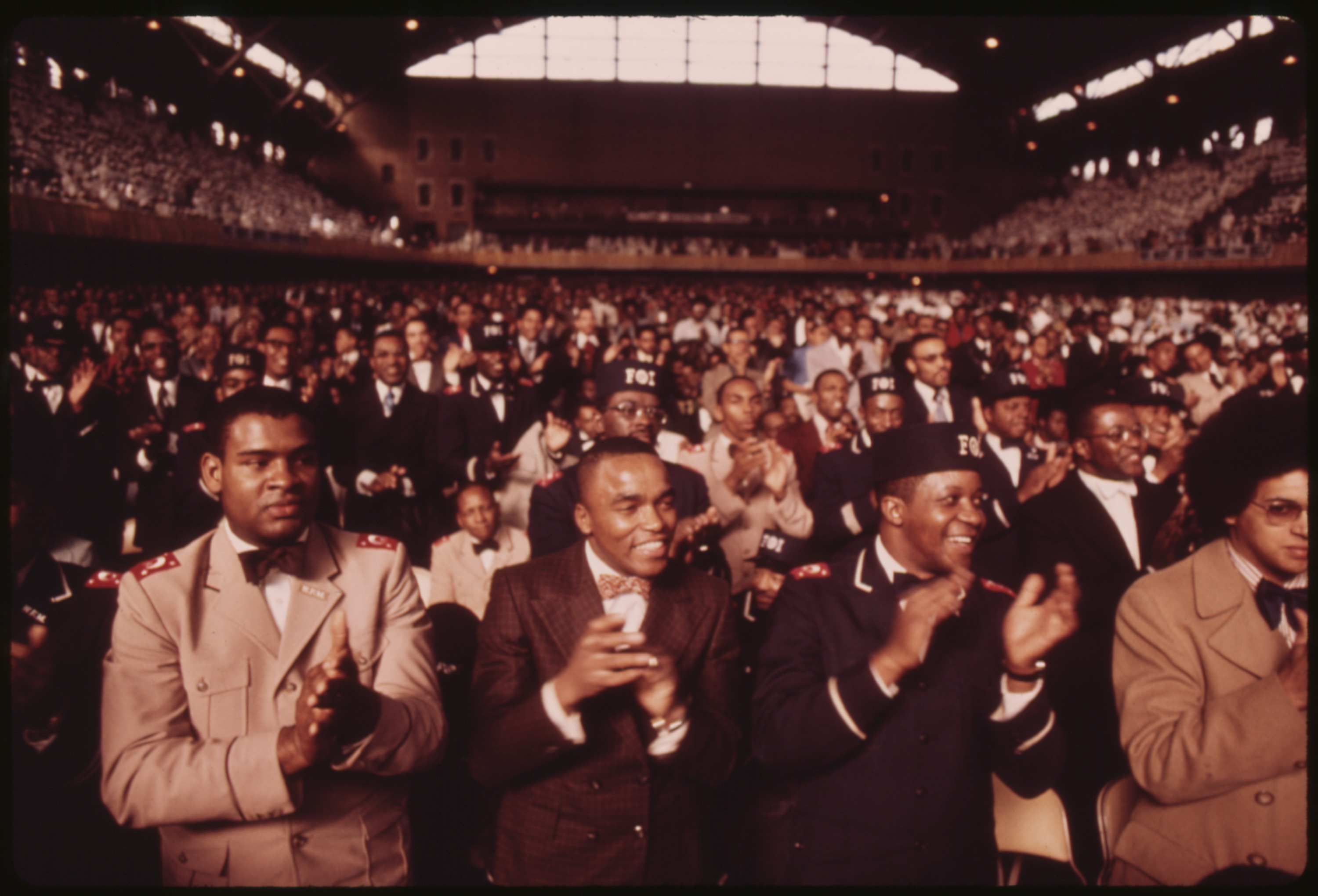
A crowd of Black Muslims applaud during Elijah Muhammad's annual Saviors' Day message in Chicago in 1974

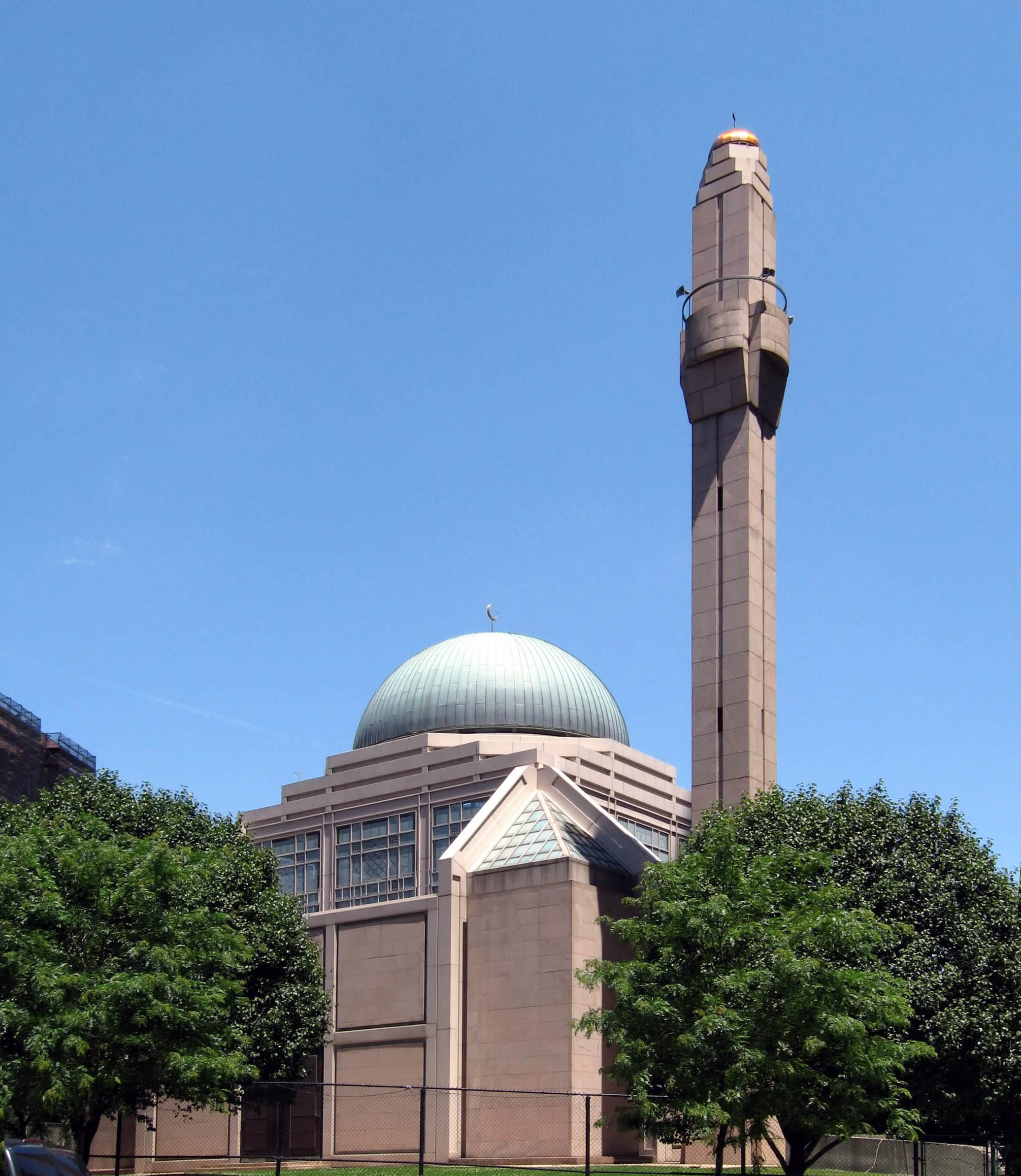
Islamic Cultural Center of New York, on the Upper East Side of Manhattan

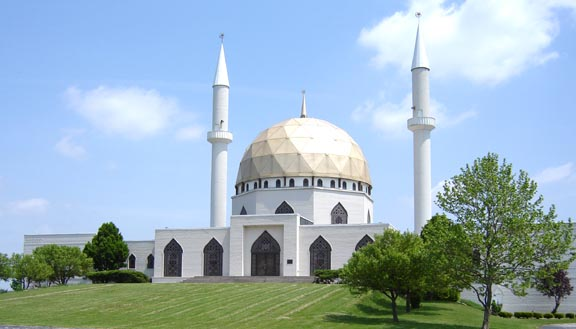
Islamic Center of Greater Toledo, Ohio

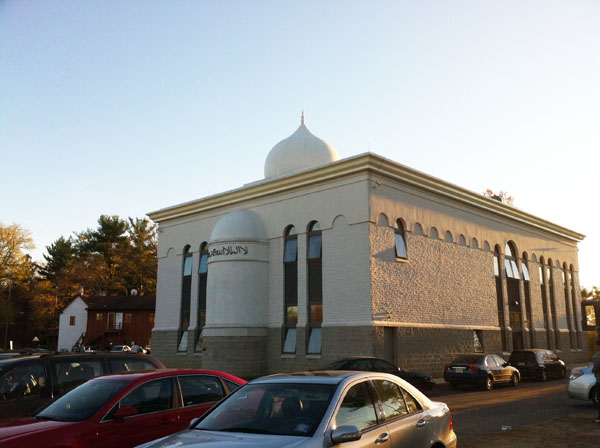
Concave-upward dome architecture at Al-Nasr Mosque, Willingboro, New Jersey

The U.S. Census Bureau does not collect data on religious identification. Various institutions and organizations have given widely varying estimates about the Muslim population in the U.S. Tom W. Smith, author of "Estimating the Muslim Population in the United States", said that of twenty estimates he reviewed during a five-year period until 2001, none was "based on a scientifically-sound or explicit methodology. All can probably be characterized as guesses or assertions. Nine came from Muslim organizations such as the Islamic Society of North America, the Muslim Student Association, the Council on American-Islamic Relations, the American Muslim Council, and the Harvard Islamic Society or unspecified 'Muslim sources'. None of these sources gave any basis for their figures." In 2005, according to The New York Times, more people from Muslim-majority countries became legal permanent United States residents—nearly 96,000—than in any year in the previous two decades.

According to CAIR, no scientific count of Muslims in the U.S. has been done and the larger figures should be considered accurate. Some journalists have also alleged that the higher numbers have been inflated for political purposes.

According to the 2010 US Religion Census, there were estimated to be 2.6 million Muslims and over 2,000 Mosques in the US. According to a Pew Forum estimate, in 2017 there were 3.45 million Muslims, constituting about 1.1% of the total U.S. population, compared with 70.6% who follow Christianity, 22.8% unaffiliated, 1.9% Judaism, 0.7% Buddhism, and 0.7% Hinduism. A Pew Forum report on American religion found that Muslims accounted for 0.9% of American adults in 2014, up from 0.4% in 2007, due largely to immigration. Retention rates were high, at 77%, similar to Hindus (80%) and Jews (75%); most people who leave these religions become unaffiliated, although ex-Muslims were more likely to be Christians than ex-Hindus or ex-Jews were. Conversely, 23% of American Muslims were converts, including 8% from historically black Protestant traditions, 6% from being unaffiliated, 4% from Catholicism, and 3% from mainline or evangelical Protestantism. By race, in 2014, 38% were non-Hispanic white (including Arabs and Iranians, up from 32% in 2007), 28% were Asian (mostly Indians, Pakistanis, and Bangladeshis, up from 20% in 2007), 28% were black (down from 32%), 4% Hispanic (down from 7%), and 3% of mixed or other race (down from 7%). Since 2007, the black proportion had shrunk, while the white and Asian proportions had grown, mainly due to immigration as most black Muslims were native U.S. blacks.

According to data from the General Social Survey in the United States "32% of those raised Muslim no longer embrace Islam in adulthood, and 18% hold no religious identification". According to Pew Research, the number of American converts to Islam is roughly equal to the number of American Muslims who leave the religion.

=== Race ===
According to a 2001 study written by Ihsan Bagby, an associate professor of Islamic studies at the University of Kentucky, of Americans who convert to Islam, 64% are African American, 27% are white, 6% are Hispanic of any race, and 3% are other. Around that time increasing numbers of American Hispanics converted to Islam. Many Hispanic converts in Houston said that they often had been mistaken as of being of Pakistani or Middle Eastern descent, due to their religion. Many Hispanic converts were former Christians.

Since the arrival of South Asian and Arab communities around the 1990s, there has been divisions with the African Americans due to the racial and cultural differences; however, since September 11, 2001, the two groups joined when the immigrant communities looked towards the African Americans for advice on civil rights.

=== Religion ===
According to a 2014 religious survey, 64% of American Muslims believe religion is very important, compared to 58% of American Catholics who believe so. The frequency of receiving answers to prayers among Muslims was, 31% at least once a week and 12% once or twice a month. Nearly a quarter of the Muslims are converts to Islam (23%), mainly native-born. Of the total who have converted, 59% are African American and 34% white. Previous religions of those converted was Protestantism (67%), Roman Catholicism (10%), and 15% no religion.

Mosques are usually explicitly Sunni or Shia although there are over 55 Ahmadiyya mosques as well. There are 2,769 mosques in the United States as of 2020, and the nation's largest mosque, the Islamic Center of America, is in Dearborn, Michigan. It caters mainly to the Shia Muslim congregation; however, all Muslims may attend this mosque. It was rebuilt in 2005 to accommodate over 3,000 people for the increasing Muslim population in the region. More than half (55%) of the religious affiliations of Muslims is Sunni, 16% Shia, 22% non-affiliated and 16% other/non-response. Muslims of Arab descent are mostly Sunni (56%) with minorities who are Shia (19%). Muslims of South Asian descent including Bangladeshis (90%), Indians (82%) and Pakistanis (72%) are mainly Sunni, other groups such as Iranians are mainly Shia (91%). Of African American Muslims, 48% are Sunni, 34% are unaffiliated (mostly part of the Community of W. Deen Mohammed), 16% other (mostly Nation of Islam and Ahmadiyya) and 2% Shia.

In many areas, a mosque may be dominated by whatever group of immigrants is the largest. Sometimes the Friday sermons, or khutbas, are given in languages like Urdu/Hindi, Bengali or Arabic along with English. Areas with large Muslim populations may support a number of mosques serving different immigrant groups or varieties of belief within Sunni or Shia traditions. At present, many mosques are served by imams who immigrate from overseas, as only these imams have certificates from Muslim seminaries.

=== Education and income ===
The household income levels of American Muslims are about as evenly distributed as the general American population.

When it comes to education, the Institute for Social Policy and Understanding reported in 2017 that across the board, American Muslims, Protestants, and Catholics have similar education levels. It has also been found that Muslim women (73%) are more likely than Muslim men (57%) to go on to pursue higher education beyond high school, and they are also more likely to report being in the middle class.

Current estimates show that there are 270 full-time Islamic schools that enroll between 26,000 and 35,500 students in the United States. Islamic k-12 schools typically teach tawhid, or belief that God is the creator and sustainer of the universe; ilm, the imperative to seek knowledge; and ta’lim, and specific teaching about the Qur’an and ahadith. Some private Islamic schools in the United States cater to specific ethnic and/or cultural communities. Others enroll students from diverse backgrounds and ethnicities. Specific subject that are taught include Arabic, Qur’an, and Islamic studies along with academic subjects such as math, science, English, history, civics, and in some schools, art and music. Typically Islamic schools integrate religious knowledge throughout the curricula, incorporate prayer into their daily schedules, require modest dress, and serve halal food.

Among South Asians in the country, the large Pakistani American community stands out as particularly well educated and prosperous, with education and income levels exceeding those of U.S.-born whites. Many are professionals, especially in medicine (they account for 2.7–5% of America's physicians), scientists, engineers, and financial analysts, and there are also a large number of entrepreneurs. There are more than 15,000 medical doctors practicing medicine in the USA who are of Pakistani origin alone and the number of Pakistani American millionaires was reported to be in the thousands. Shahid Khan is a Pakistani-born American multi billionaire businessmen and owner of the Jacksonville Jaguars of the National Football League (NFL) making him the first and only ethnic minority member to own one, he also owns English Premier League team Fulham F.C., and automobile parts manufacturer Flex-N-Gate in Urbana, Illinois.

45 percent of immigrant Muslims report annual household income levels of $50,000 or higher. This compares to the national average of 44 percent. Immigrant Muslims are well represented among higher-income earners, with 19 percent having annual household incomes of $100,000 or higher (compared to 16 percent for the Muslim population as a whole and 17 percent for the U.S. average). This is likely due to the strong concentration of Muslims in professional, managerial, and technical fields, especially in information technology, education, medicine, law, and the corporate world.

=== By state ===
There were estimated to be about 4.5 million Muslim adherents across the United States in 2020.

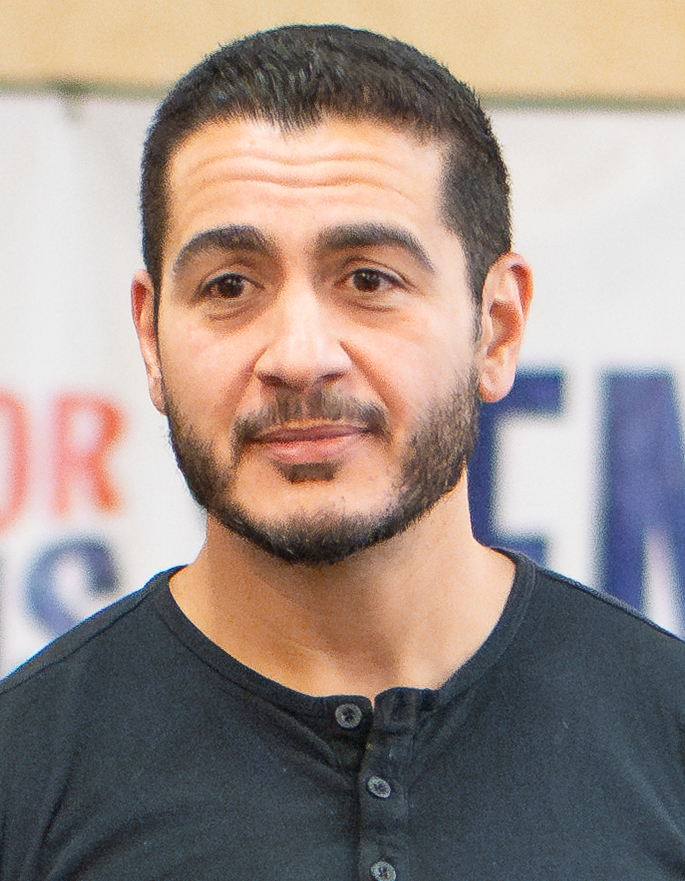
Abdul El-Sayed, Upcoming senator of Michigan.

State	Total Muslim population (estimate)	Muslims as percentage of total state/national population (estimate)	Percentage of total US Muslim population living in state/country (estimate)
United States	4,453,908	1.34%	100%
Illinois	473,792	3.70%	10.64%
New York	724,475	3.59%	16.27%
New Jersey	321,652	3.46%	7.22%
Maryland	188,914	3.06%	4.24%
Michigan	241,828	2.40%	5.43%
Minnesota	114,590	2.01%	2.57%
Virginia	169,371	1.96%	3.80%
Massachusetts	131,749	1.87%	2.96%
Arizona	109,765	1.53%	2.46%
California	504,056	1.27%	11.32%
North Carolina	130,661	1.25%	2.93%
Maine	16,894	1.24%	0.38%
Connecticut	43,905	1.22%	0.99%
Wisconsin	68,699	1.17%	1.54%
Pennsylvania	149,561	1.15%	3.36%
Georgia	123,652	1.15%	2.78%
District of Columbia	7,528	1.09%	0.17%
Texas	313,209	1.07%	7.03%
Ohio	120,077	1.02%	2.70%
Vermont	6,201	0.96%	0.14%
Missouri	53,443	0.87%	1.20%
Utah	25,403	0.78%	0.57%
Iowa	23,211	0.73%	0.52%
Delaware	7,065	0.71%	0.16%
Indiana	41,400	0.61%	0.93%
Florida	127,172	0.59%	2.86%
Tennessee	39,745	0.58%	0.89%
New Mexico	12,046	0.57%	0.27%
Louisiana	24,732	0.53%	0.56%
Alabama	23,550	0.47%	0.53%
Kentucky	17,957	0.40%	0.40%
Oklahoma	15,290	0.39%	0.34%
Washington	27,391	0.36%	0.61%
Nevada	7,400	0.24%	0.17%
Rhode Island	2,599	0.24%	0.06%
Arkansas	6,765	0.22%	0.15%
Colorado	10,828	0.19%	0.24%
Idaho	2,531	0.14%	0.06%
South Carolina	6,677	0.13%	0.15%
Kansas	3,615	0.12%	0.08%
Oregon	4,934	0.12%	0.11%
Nebraska	2,402	0.12%	0.05%
Mississippi	3,106	0.10%	0.07%
New Hampshire	1,172	0.09%	0.03%
North Dakota	540	0.07%	0.01%
South Dakota	535	0.06%	0.01%
West Virginia	849	0.05%	0.02%
Alaska	400	0.05%	0.01%
Wyoming	226	0.04%	0.01%
Montana	200	0.02%	<0.01%
Hawaii	145	0.01%	<0.01%

==== Population concentrations ====
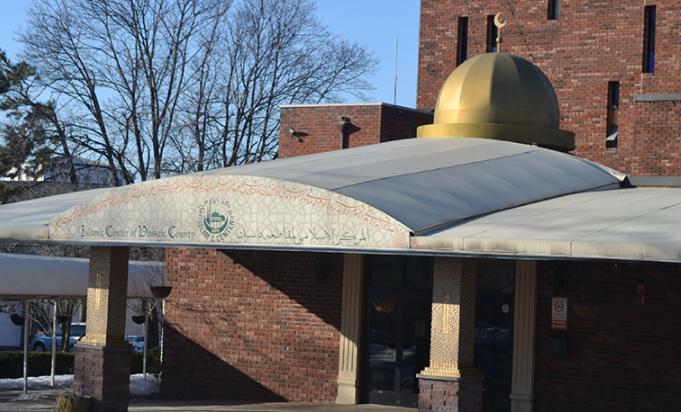
The Islamic Center of Passaic County in Paterson is the epicenter of Muslim culture in New Jersey, the U.S. state with the third-highest Muslim population concentration.

Generally speaking, Muslims are concentrated in the Eastern one-third of the United States, and particularly in the Northeast megalopolis, given the region's relative proximity to West Asia, North Africa, Central Asia, and South Asia by flight. New York City had the largest number of Muslims in the US with approximately 75,000. In 2000, Dearborn, Michigan, ranked second with 29,181, and Los Angeles ranked third with 25,673; although Paterson, New Jersey, in the New York City Metropolitan Area, was estimated to have become home to 25,000 to 30,000 Muslims as of 2011. The Muslim population in the New York metropolitan area approximates 1.5 million, the largest metropolitan Muslim population in the Western Hemisphere.

As of 2020, New York was the state home to the highest absolute number of Muslims, by a significant margin, at over 724,000. By percentages of the population, Illinois, the State of New York, New Jersey, and Maryland all hosted population concentrations greater than 3%. Paterson in New Jersey has been nicknamed Little Ramallah and Little Istanbul and contains a neighborhood with the same name, with an Arab American population estimated as high as 20,000 in 2015. Philadelphia was estimated to have 30,000 to 50,000 Muslims as of 2012. Houston was estimated to have 63,000 Muslims as of 2012.

=== Mosques ===
Number of mosques per million residents in each U.S. state and the District of Columbia as of 2020

In 2020, the US Mosque Survey identified 2,796 Islamic places of worship in the United States, a "31% increase from the 2010 count." The U.S. states with the highest number of mosques were New York (343), California (304), Texas (224), Florida (157), and New Jersey (141), with New York gaining the highest number of mosques compared to 2011 (86 additional). As part of a sampled survey, the US Mosque Survey reports that 6% of mosques self identified as Shi'ite. Pew Research Center notes that 61% of respondents to the survey "say that women have served on the board at some point in the last five years."

Previously, in 2011, the number of mosques in the United States was 2,106. At the time, the six states with the highest numbers of mosques were: New York (257), California (246), Texas (166), Florida (118), Illinois (109), and New Jersey (109).

In the United States in particular, it has been shown in a study done by the Institute for Social Policy and Understanding that Muslim Americans who regularly attend mosques are more likely to work with their neighbors to solve community problems (49 vs. 30 percent), be registered to vote (74 vs. 49 percent), and plan to vote (92 vs. 81 percent). The study also states that “there is no correlation between Muslim attitudes toward violence and their frequency of mosque attendance.”

Regarding mosque attendance, data shows that American Muslim women and American Muslim men attend the mosque at similar rates (45% for men and 35% for women). Additionally, when compared to the general public looking at the attendance of religious services, young Muslim Americans attend the mosque at closer rates to older Muslim Americans. A Pew Research study found that women attendance at American mosques increased from 2011 to 2020, as did women participation in mosque administration, including positions on the board of trustees.

== Culture ==
Within the Muslim community in the United States there exist a number of different traditions. As in the rest of the world, the Sunni Muslims are in the majority. Shia Muslims, especially those in the Iranian immigrant community, are also active in community affairs. All four major schools of Islamic jurisprudence (fiqh) are found among the Sunni community.

Muslims in the United States have increasingly made their own culture; there are various Muslim comedy groups, rap groups, Scout troops and magazines, and Muslims have been vocal in other forms of media as well.

Hijab is commonly worn by Muslim women in the United States, and is a very distinctive cultural feature of Muslims in America. According to a Pew Research Center poll from 2011, 36% of Muslim American women reported wearing hijab whenever they were in public, with an additional 24% indicating they wore it most or some of the time, while only 40% indicated that they never wore the headcover. Contrary to popular beliefs about assimilation, the study found that the number of women wearing hijab was in fact higher among native-born Muslim women compared to first-generation Muslim immigrants. In the 1990s, however, hijabs were not commonly seen in the United States, as overt Islamization became more apparent only during the 21st century. Compared to some nations in Western Europe, such as France and the Netherlands, there have been relatively few controversies surrounding the hijab in everyday life, a product of "pro-religious freedom" laws allowing for a wide range of religious accommodations, and also due to greater support for multiculturalism.

In his 2008 book Al' America, writer and journalist Jonathan Curiel wrote about the consequences of 9/11 on the perception of Islamic culture in America, stating that it has been difficult for some Americans to "see Arab and Muslim culture as anything other than terrorism and fundamentalism". The Islamic experience in the US is also not well known or researched among mainstream society, with Jewish scholar Lior Sternfeld stating, "Muslim-Americans were a much smaller and more marginalized community, but it's changing."

== Notable American Muslims ==
=== Religion ===
- Yusuf Estes – American Salafi Preacher, and founder and president of GuideUS TV
- Omar Suleiman – Islamic scholar, founder and president of the Yaqeen Institute for Islamic Research, imam of Valley Ranch Islamic Center
- Yasir Qadhi – Imam and resident Islamic scholar for the East Plano Islamic Center (EPIC Masjid)
- Suhaib Webb – Former imam of the Islamic Society of Boston Cultural Center (ISBCC)
- Hamza Yusuf – Islamic scholar, President and co-founder of Zaytuna College
- Zaid Shakir – Islamic scholar, co-founder of Zaytuna

=== Sports and athletics ===
- Muhammad Ali – was an American professional boxer and activist. Nicknamed "the Greatest", he is regarded as one of the most significant sports figures of the 20th century and is often regarded as the greatest heavyweight boxer of all time.
- Kareem Abdul-Jabbar – is an American former professional basketball player who played 20 seasons in the National Basketball Association (NBA) for the Milwaukee Bucks and Los Angeles Lakers. During his career as a center, Abdul-Jabbar was a record six-time NBA Most Valuable Player (MVP).
- Mike Tyson – is an American former professional boxer. He reigned as the undisputed world heavyweight champion from 1987 to 1990 and is regarded as one of the greatest heavyweight boxers of all time.
- Belal Muhammad – is an American professional mixed martial artist who currently competes in the Welterweight division of the Ultimate Fighting Championship (UFC).
- Oday Aboushi – is a Palestinian-American former American football offensive guard. He played college football at Virginia and was selected by the New York Jets in the fifth round of the 2013 NFL Draft.
- Ameer Abdullah – is an American football running back for the Las Vegas Raiders of the National Football League (NFL). He was selected by the Detroit Lions in the second round of the 2015 NFL draft. He played college football for the Nebraska Cornhuskers.
- Jaylen Brown – is an American professional basketball player for the Boston Celtics of the National Basketball Association (NBA).
- Yunus Musah – is an American professional soccer player who plays as a midfielder for Serie A club AC Milan and the United States national team.
- Nico Ali Walsh – is an American professional boxer. The grandson of Muhammad Ali, Walsh came into the ring for his pro debut in August 2021 wearing his grandfather's personal white Everlast shorts, which were passed down to him in 2016 with the death of his grandfather.
- Hassan Diarra – is an American college basketball player for the UConn Huskies of the Big East Conference.
- Ryan Harris (American football) – is a former American football offensive tackle of the National Football League (NFL).
- Mustafa Ali – is an American professional wrestler, currently performing for Total Nonstop Action Wrestling (TNA) and New Japan Pro-Wrestling (NJPW) on per-appearance deals, as well as on the independent circuit, the former in which he is the current TNA X Division Champion in his first reign.
- Mahmoud Abdul-Rauf – is an American former professional basketball player.
- Jabri Abdur-Rahim – is an American college basketball player for the Providence Friars of the Big East Conference.
- Hasim Rahman – is an American former professional boxer who competed from 1994 to 2014.
- Hasim Rahman Jr. – is an American professional boxer who challenged for the WBC-USNBC heavyweight title in 2022.
- Nazr Mohammed – is an American former professional basketball player who had a journeyman career in the National Basketball Association (NBA), playing for eight different teams over 18 seasons.
- Alhaji Mohammed – is an American-born Ghanaian former basketball player.
- Rasheed Wallace – is an American basketball coach and former professional player.
- Azeez Al-Shaair – is an American football linebacker for the Houston Texans of the National Football League (NFL).
- Gervonta Davis – is an American professional boxer.
- Husain Abdullah – is a former American football safety.
- Hamza Abdullah – is a former American football safety.
- Robert Saleh – is an American professional football coach who served as the head coach for the NFL team New York Jets from 2021 to 2024, he is the first Muslim American to serve as the head coach of an NFL team.
- Ibtihaj Muhammad – is an American writer, fashion designer, Sabre fencer who is a Bronze Medal Winner in the 2016 Summer Olympics Games.

=== Science ===
- Shereef Elnahal – commissioner, New Jersey Department of Health, transitioning to CEO of University Hospital, Newark in July 2019
- Ayub K. Ommaya – neurosurgeon, inventor of the Ommaya reservoir
- Ahmed Zewail – Nobel Prize winner in Chemistry, 1999 for his work on femtochemistry
- Aziz Sancar – Nobel Prize winner in Chemistry, 2015 along with Tomas Lindahl and Paul L. Modrich for their mechanistic studies of DNA repair

=== Engineering ===
- Fazlur Khan – structural engineer (designed the Sears Tower, John Hancock Center)

=== Business ===
- Amjad Masad – CEO and founder of Replit
- Mohamed Abouelenein, Ahmed Elsaka, & Abdelbaset Elsayed – The 3 owners & founders of The Halal Guys, an American Halal Fast casual restaurant franchise since 1990.

=== Music ===
- Solána Imani Rowe – American singer-songwriter. Known for her diaristic lyrics and genre explorations, she is regarded as a prominent figure in influencing contemporary R&B music and popularizing alternative R&B.

=== Activism ===
- Linda Sarsour – Left-wing political activist and Islamist; one of the organizers of the Women's March.

== Politics ==
=== Congress ===
As of the 119th US Congress, four Democrats identify as Muslim (0.8% total): André Carson, Ilhan Omar, Rashida Tlaib, Lateefah Simon.

=== Party politics ===
In the 2000 Presidential election, 78 percent of Muslim Americans supported Republican candidate George W. Bush over Democratic candidate Al Gore. However, due to increased anti-Muslim rhetoric from the Republican Party after the September 11 attacks, support for the Republican Party among American Muslims has declined sharply.

By 2004, Bush's Muslim support had been reduced to under 1%, and Democratic candidate John Kerry's support rose to 93%, with 5% voting for Ralph Nader.

By 2008, Democratic candidate Barack Obama got 67% to 90% of the Muslim vote depending on region. In total, Obama won 89% of the Muslim vote, with his Republican opponent John McCain getting only 2%. Some of his opponents question Obama's religious faith; see Barack Obama religion conspiracy theories.

By 2012, Barack Obama's support slightly falls to 85%, with 4% voting for his Republican opponent, Mitt Romney.

In a 2017 Survey done by the Institute for Social Policy and Understanding, only 15% of American Muslims wanted Donald Trump to win the 2016 presidential election, compared to 54% wanting Hillary Clinton to win. 74% of Muslims ended up voting for Clinton, compared to 13% for Trump.

According to a 2018 poll from the Institute for Social Policy and Understanding, American Muslims were as satisfied with the American trajectory as the general public, reporting at around 27%. Regarding the 45th president of the United States, Donald Trump, Muslims are the least likely to approve of him across all faith groups including non affiliated Americans. This compares to, "17% of non-affiliated Americans, 31% of Jews, 36% of Catholics, 41% of Protestants, and 72% of white Evangelicals".

According to the report belongs to a Boston-based organization that works to increase American Muslim education and civic engagement, "at least 145 American Muslims, virtually all of them Democrats, ran for state or national public office in 2018. Of these, 110 were first-time candidates who represent an unprecedented rise for a diverse Muslim community that is typically underrepresented in American politics.".

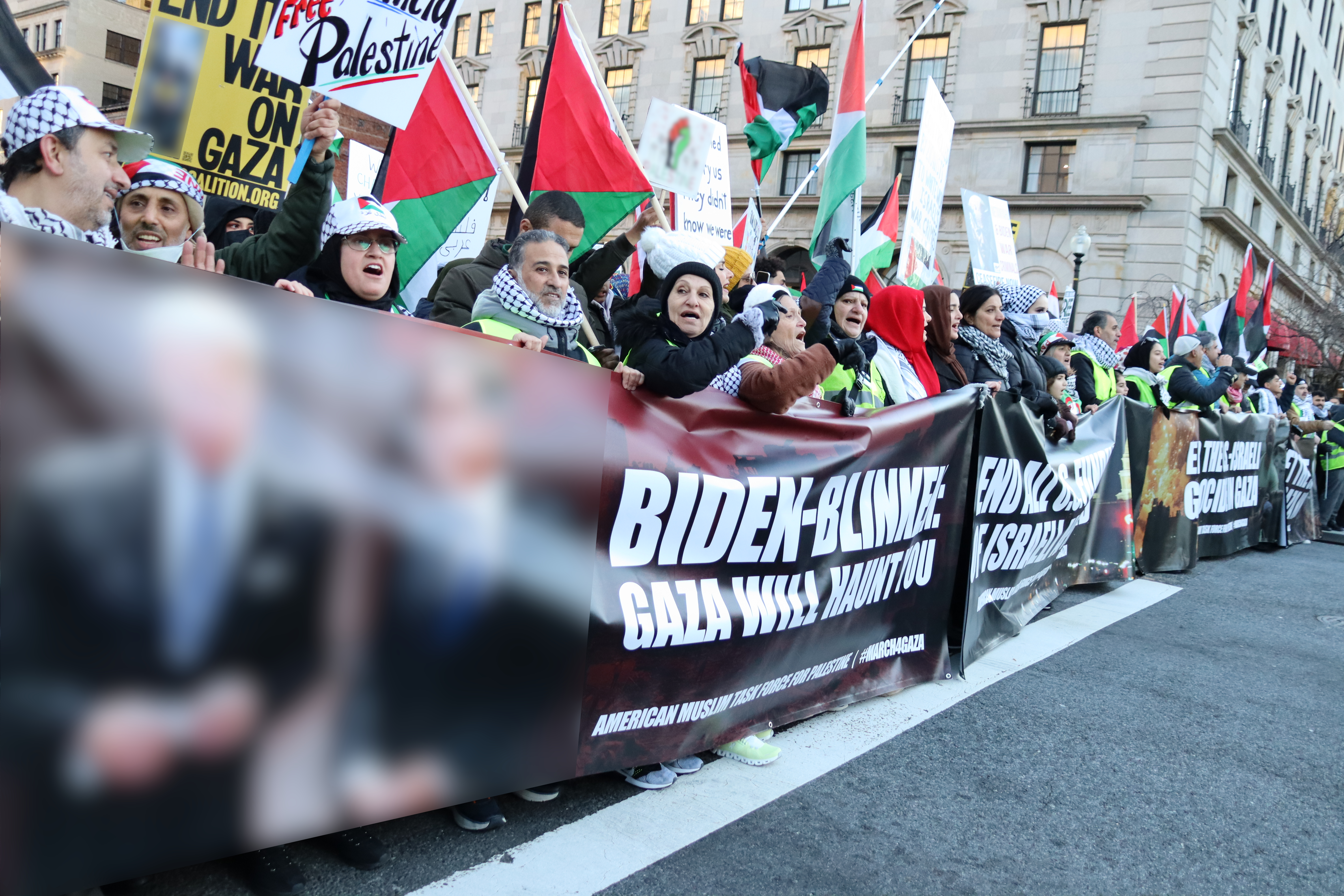
March on Washington for Gaza in January 2024

In 2020, Democratic candidate Joe Biden received 69% of the Muslim vote, whereas Republican candidate Donald Trump received 17% (an increase from 13% in 2016) (excluding those who refused to answer, it would be 78% for Biden and 19% for Trump). Another survey showed that 86% of Muslims voted for Joe Biden, compared to just 6% for Trump. The remaining 8% either did not vote or supported a different candidate.

American Muslim political engagement is increasing, as 75% of American Muslims surveyed by ISPU reported being registered to vote, an increase of 15% from 2016 data. In January 2019, Sadaf Jaffer became the first female Muslim American mayor, first female South Asian mayor, and first female Pakistani-American mayor in the United States, of Montgomery in Somerset County, New Jersey. In June 2022, Republican candidate Mehmet Oz became the first Muslim to be nominated by a major party for the U.S. Senate.

During the 2024 United States presidential election, an August 2024 survey published by the Council on American-Islamic Relations (CAIR) found that 29% of Muslim voters planned to vote for Jill Stein. In Michigan, 40 percent of Muslim voters supported Stein, 18% supported Trump and 12% supported Harris. CAIR's final election poll, published on November 1, showed that nationwide among Muslims, 42.3% planned to vote for Stein, 41% for Harris, and 9.8% for Trump. In CAIR's exit poll, published on November 8, 53% of Muslims voted for the Green Party candidate, Jill Stein. Only 20% of Muslims voted for Harris and only 21% voted for Trump.

American Muslim vote by presidential election
Election year	Republican	Democratic	Green
2000	78%	22% (Note: Includes voters for all non-Republican candidates, not only Democrats.)	—
2004	<1%	93%	5% (Note: This is the percent of Muslims who backed Ralph Nader, who was an independent candidate)
2008	2%	89%	—
2012	4%	85%	—
2016	13%	74%	—
2020	19%	78%	—
2024	21%	20%	53%

== Organizations ==
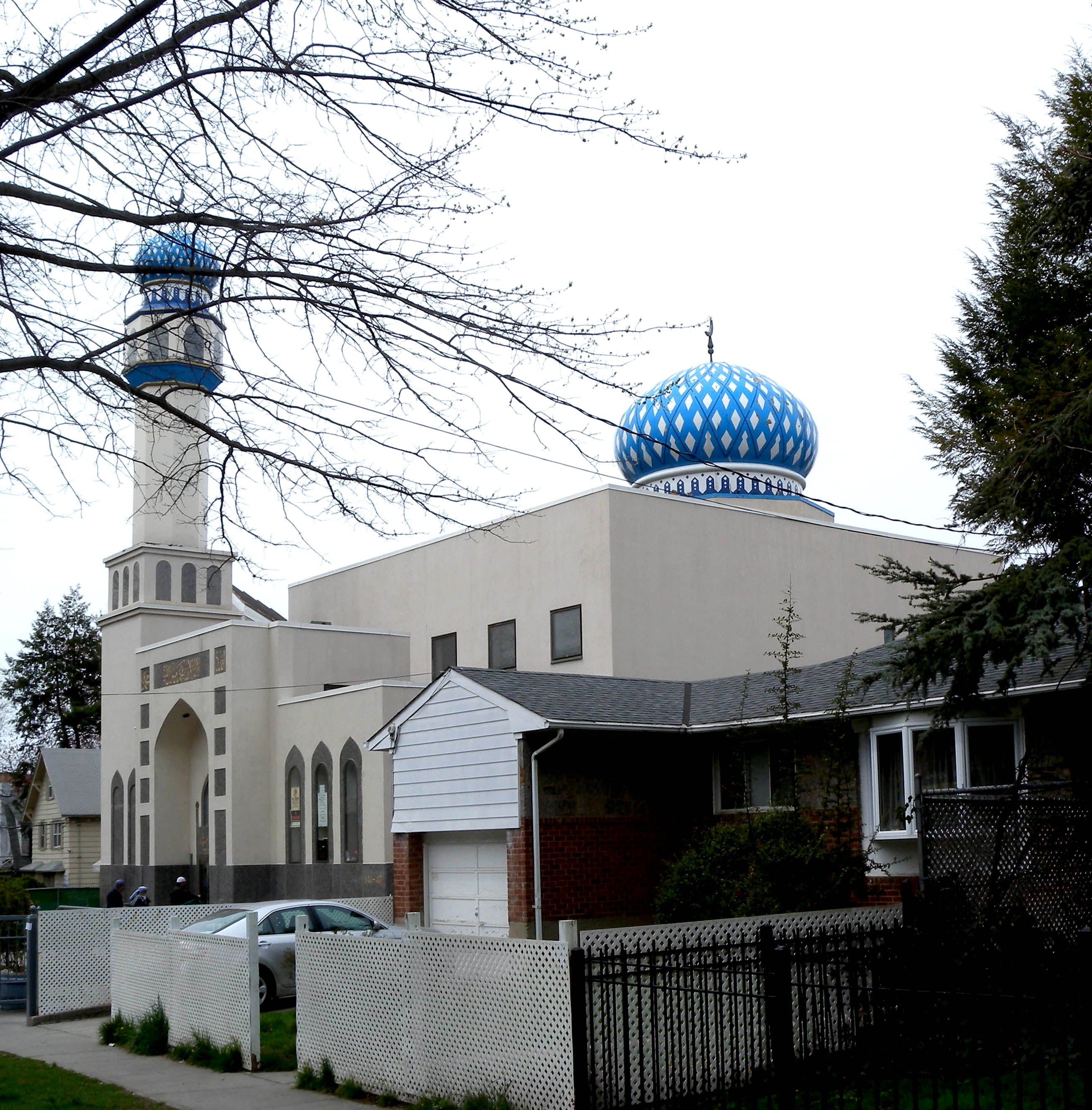
Mosque in Queens, New York City with classical dome architecture

One of the largest Islamic organizations is the Islamic Society of North America (ISNA) which says that 27% of mosques in the U.S. are associated with it. ISNA is an association of immigrant Muslim organizations and individuals that provides a common platform for presenting Islam. It is composed mostly of immigrants. Its membership may have recently exceeded ASM, as many independent mosques throughout the United States are choosing to affiliate with it. ISNA's annual convention is the largest gathering of Muslims in the United States.

The second-largest Muslim organization is the community under the leadership of W. Deen Mohammed, or the American Society of Muslims, with 19% of mosques, mostly African Americans having an affiliation with it. It was the successor organization to the Nation of Islam, once better-known as the Black Muslims. The association recognizes the leadership of Warith Deen Mohammed. This group evolved from the Black separatist Nation of Islam (1930–1975). The majority of its members are African Americans. This has been a 23-year process of religious reorientation and organizational decentralization, in the course of which the group was known by other names, such as the American Muslim Mission, W. Deen Mohammed guided its members to the practice of mainstream Islam such as salat or fasting, and teaching the basic creed of Islam the shahadah.

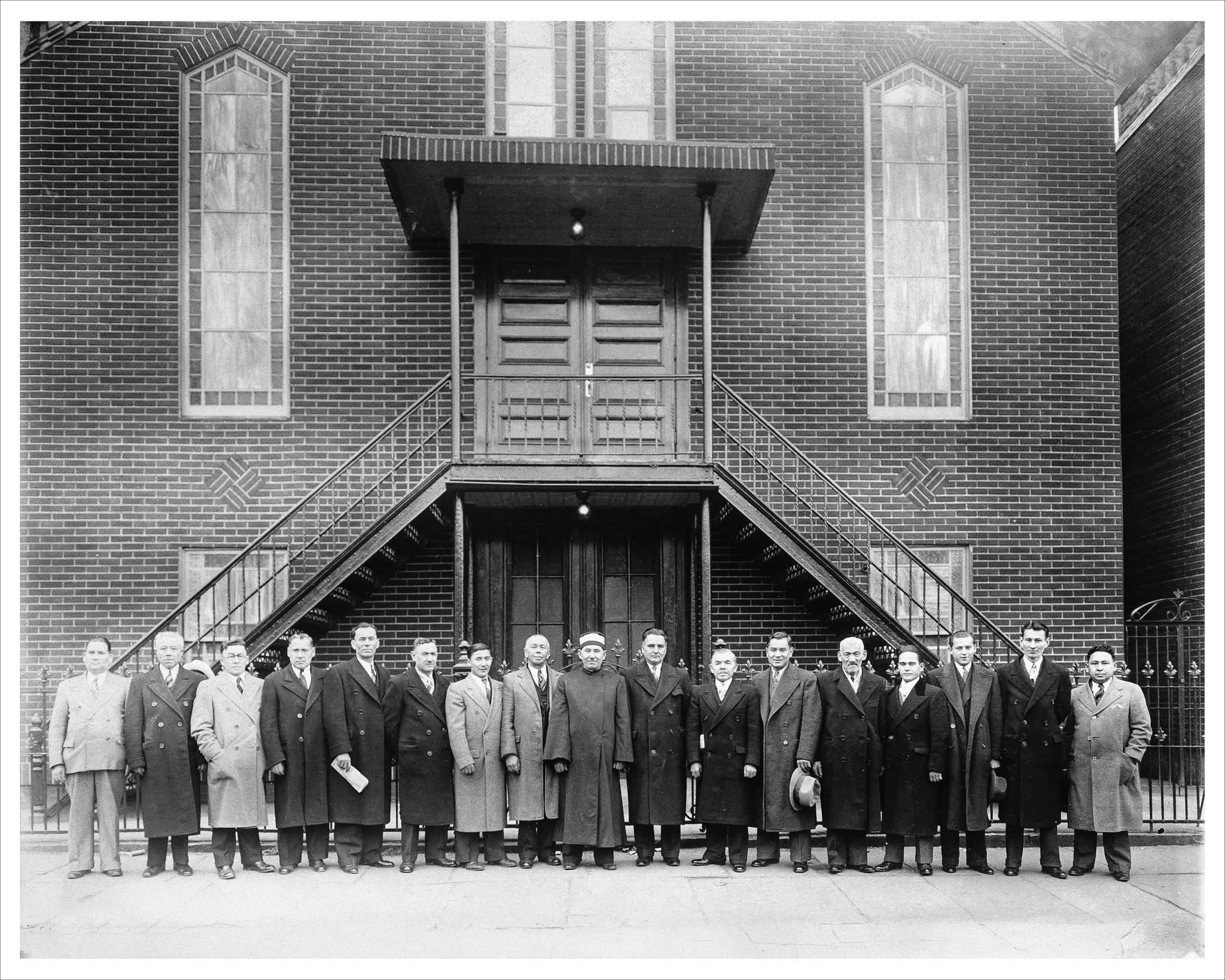
A delegation of New York Muslims at the entrance to the Powers Street Mosque in Brooklyn, New York, 1934

The first Muslim community in New York City was a Moslem Unity Association, that was created in 1927 by representatives of the first wave of Tatar emigration (primarily from the Volga-Ural region, and later from other regions of the former Russian Empire). In the late 1960s ceased operations.

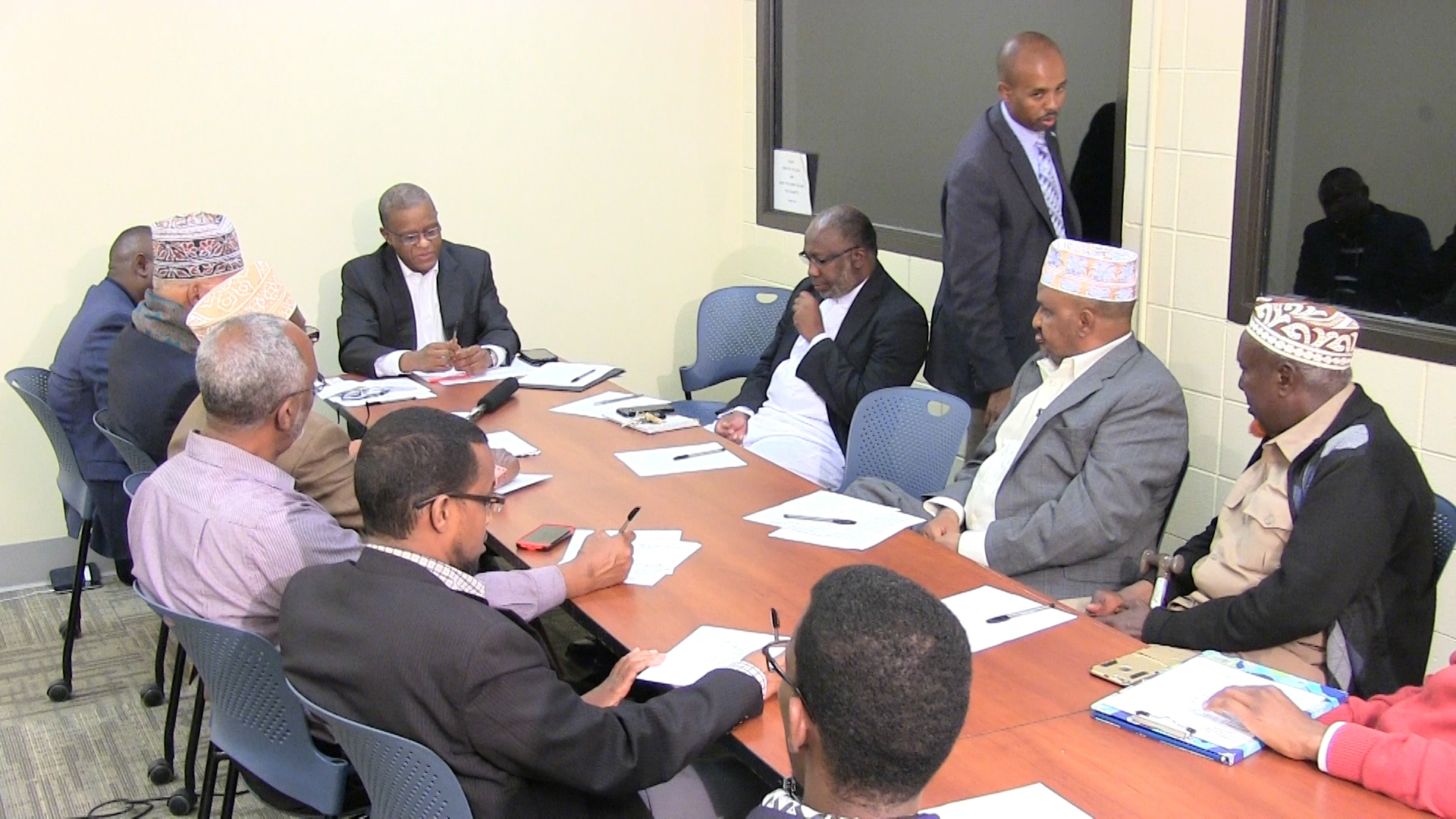
Imams from ten mosques in Minnesota

The third largest group is the Islamic Circle of North America (ICNA). ICNA describes itself as a non-ethnic, open to all, independent, North America-wide, grass-roots organization. It is composed mostly of immigrants and the children of immigrants. It is growing as various independent mosques throughout the United States join and also may be larger than ASM at the present moment. Its youth division is Young Muslims. Why Islam? is a community outreach project of ICNA; it seeks to provide accurate information about Islam while debunking popular stereotypes and common misconceptions through various services and outreach activities.

A live Quran reading at West End Islamic Center, Virginia, USA in 2025

The Islamic Supreme Council of America (ISCA) is a small organization representing Sufi teachings, which, according to adherents, is the inner, mystical dimension of Islam. The ISCA's stated aims include providing practical solutions for American Muslims, based on the traditional Islamic legal rulings of an international advisory board, many of whom are recognized as the highest ranking Islamic scholars in the world. ISCA strives to integrate traditional scholarship in resolving contemporary issues affecting the maintenance of Islamic beliefs in a modern, secular society. It has been linked to neoconservative thought.

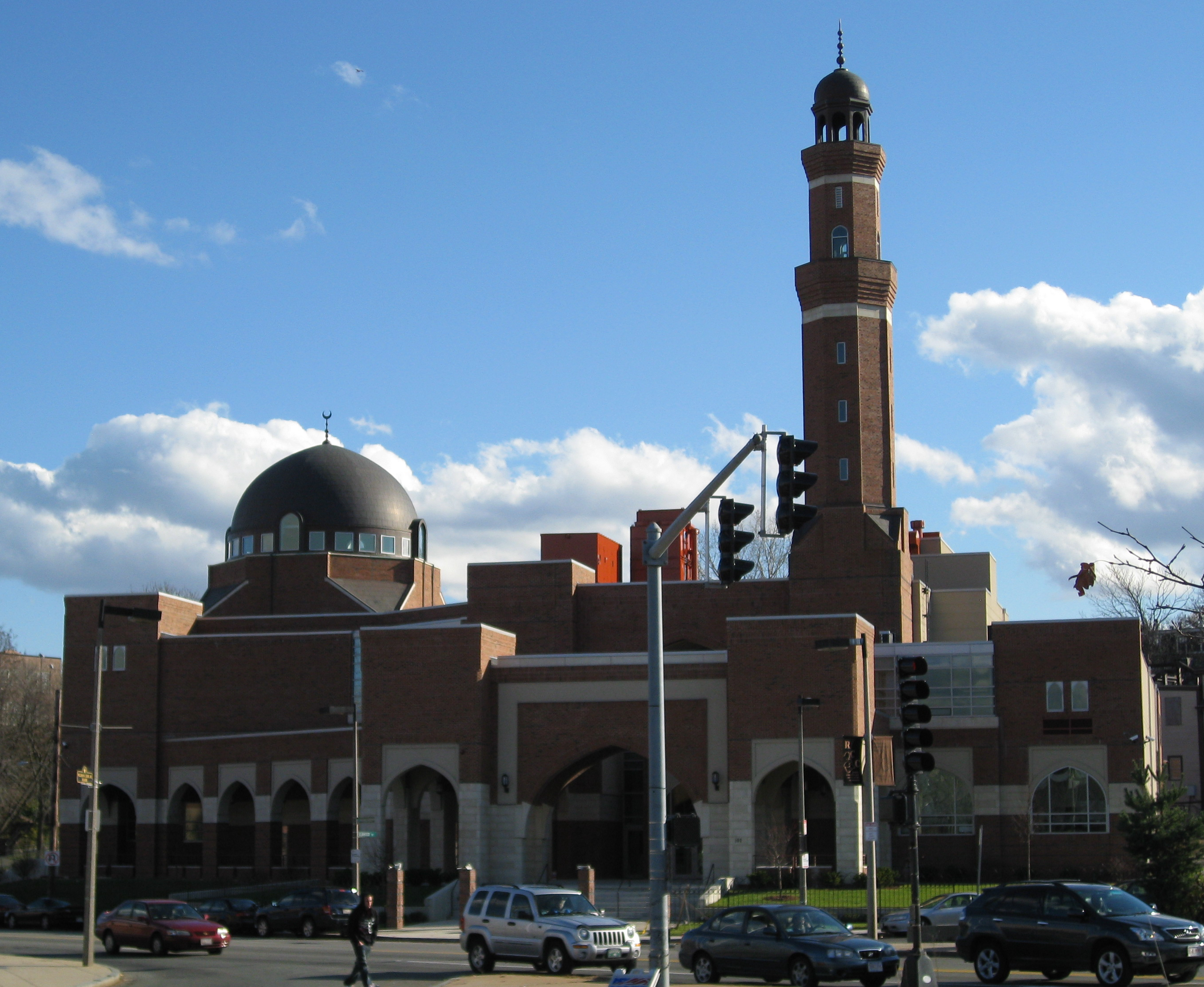
Islamic Society of Boston mosque in Roxbury.

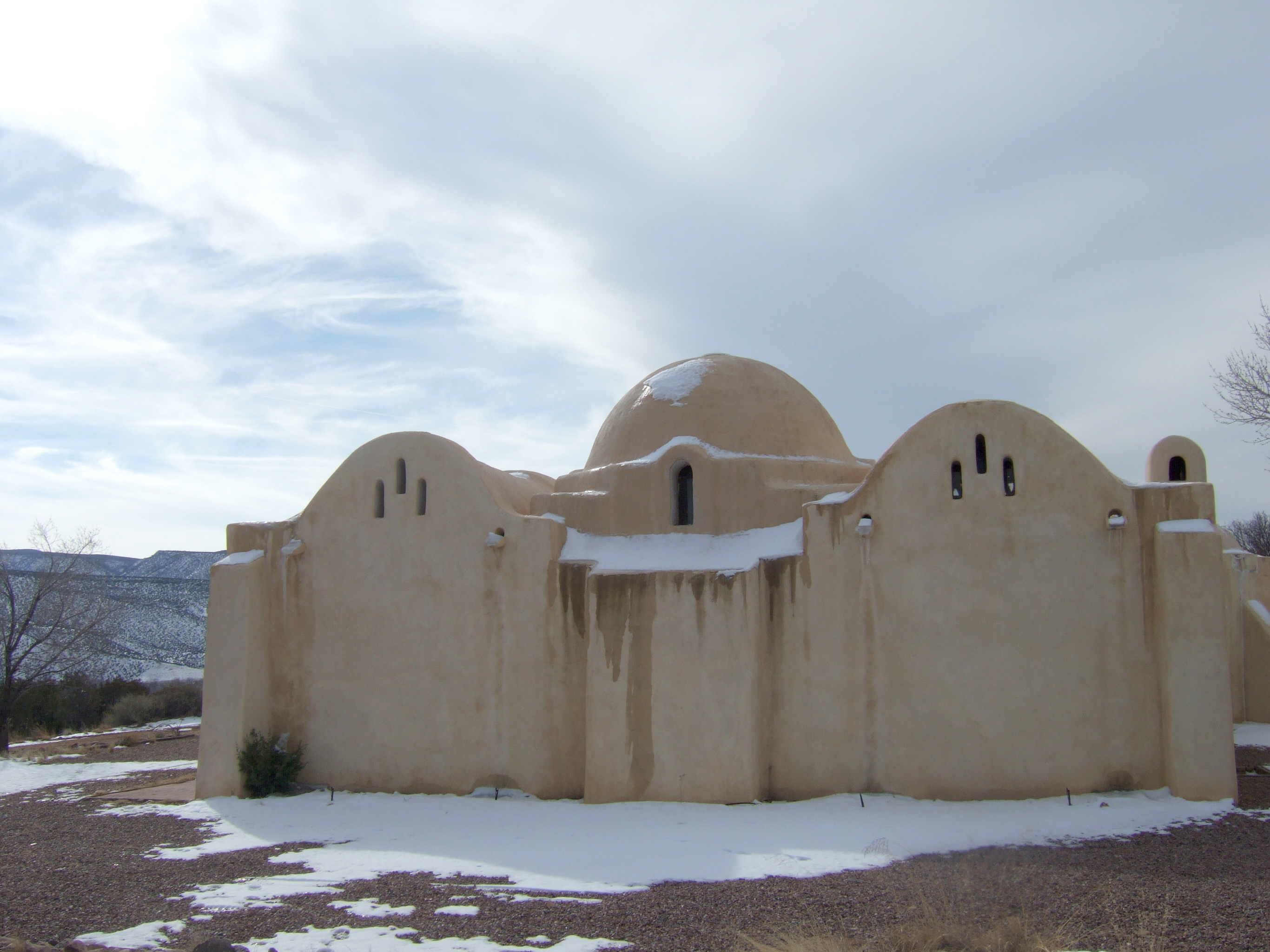
Dar al-Islam mosque near Abiquiú, New Mexico

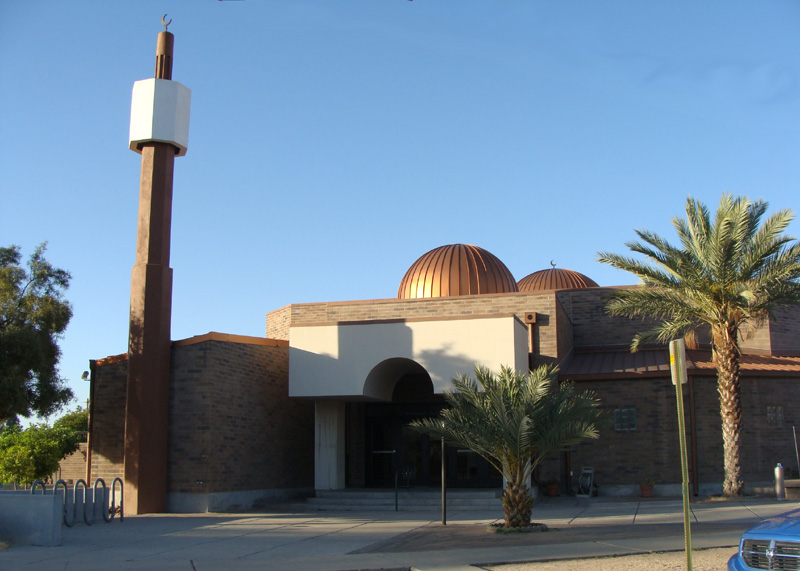
Tucson Islamic Center, Tucson, Arizona.

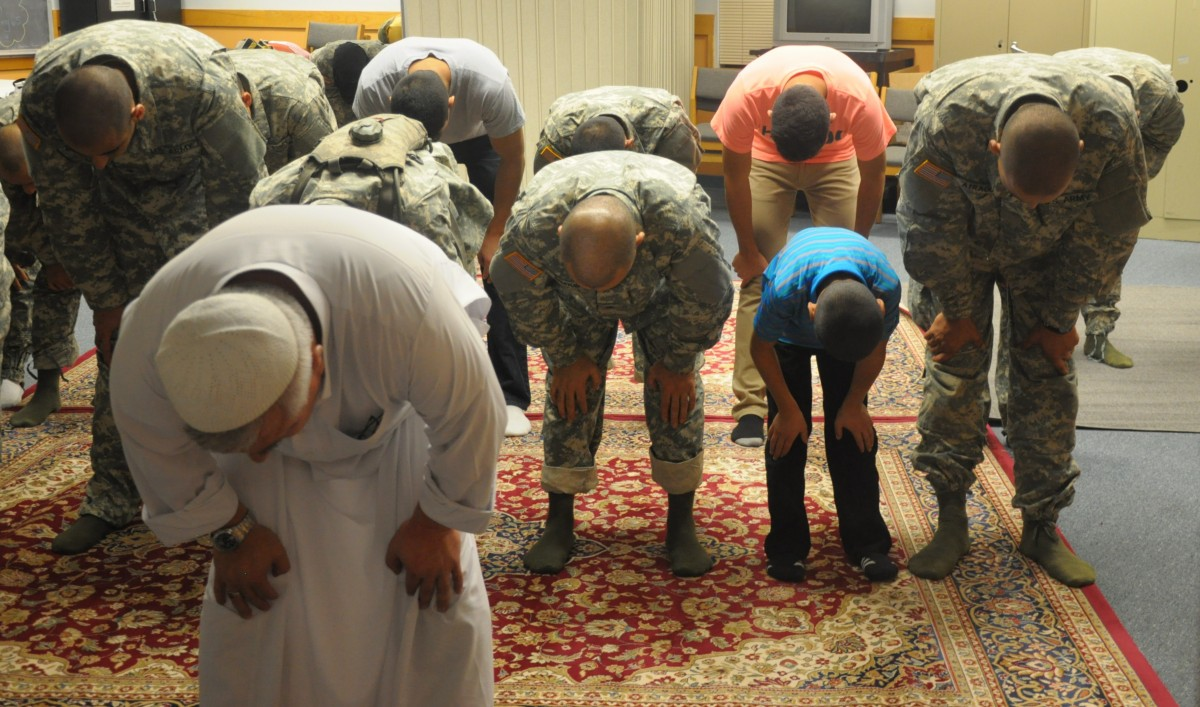
Muslim U.S. Army soldiers praying during Ramadan in 2015

The Islamic Assembly of North America (IANA) is a leading Muslim organization in the United States. According to its website, among the goals of IANA is to "unify and coordinate the efforts of the different dawah oriented organizations in North America and guide or direct the Muslims of this land to adhere to the proper Islamic methodology." In order to achieve its goals, IANA uses a number of means and methods including conventions, general meetings, dawah-oriented institutions and academies, etc. IANA folded in the aftermath of the attack of September 11, 2001 and they have reorganized under various banners such as Texas Dawah and the Almaghrib Institute.

The Muslim Students' Association (MSA) is a group dedicated, by its own description, to Islamic societies on college campuses in Canada and the United States for the good of Muslim students. The MSA is involved in providing Muslims on various campuses the opportunity to practice their religion and to ease and facilitate such activities. MSA is also involved in social activities, such as fund raisers for the homeless during Ramadan. The founders of MSA would later establish the Islamic Society of North America and Islamic Circle of North America.

The Islamic Information Center (IIC) is a "grass-roots" organization that has been formed for the purpose of informing the public, mainly through the media, about the real image of Islam and Muslims. The IIC is run by chairman (Hojatul-Islam) Imam Syed Rafiq Naqvi, various committees, and supported by volunteers.

The Shia Muslim Foundation (SMF) works to support civic rights of American Shia Muslims, and to advocate on social and political issues. SMF is noted for working with both Shia community leaders and Shia Islamic scholars and clergy in accomplishing its work.

The Ahmadiyya Muslim Community was established in the U.S. in 1921, before the existence of Nation of Islam, according to its members.

Muslim Congress, a charitable non-profit social welfare organization, aimed at promoting Islamic knowledge, morality, and values amongst Muslims in North America. They run social projects like food distribution to the homeless in their "No More Hunger" project.

=== Political ===
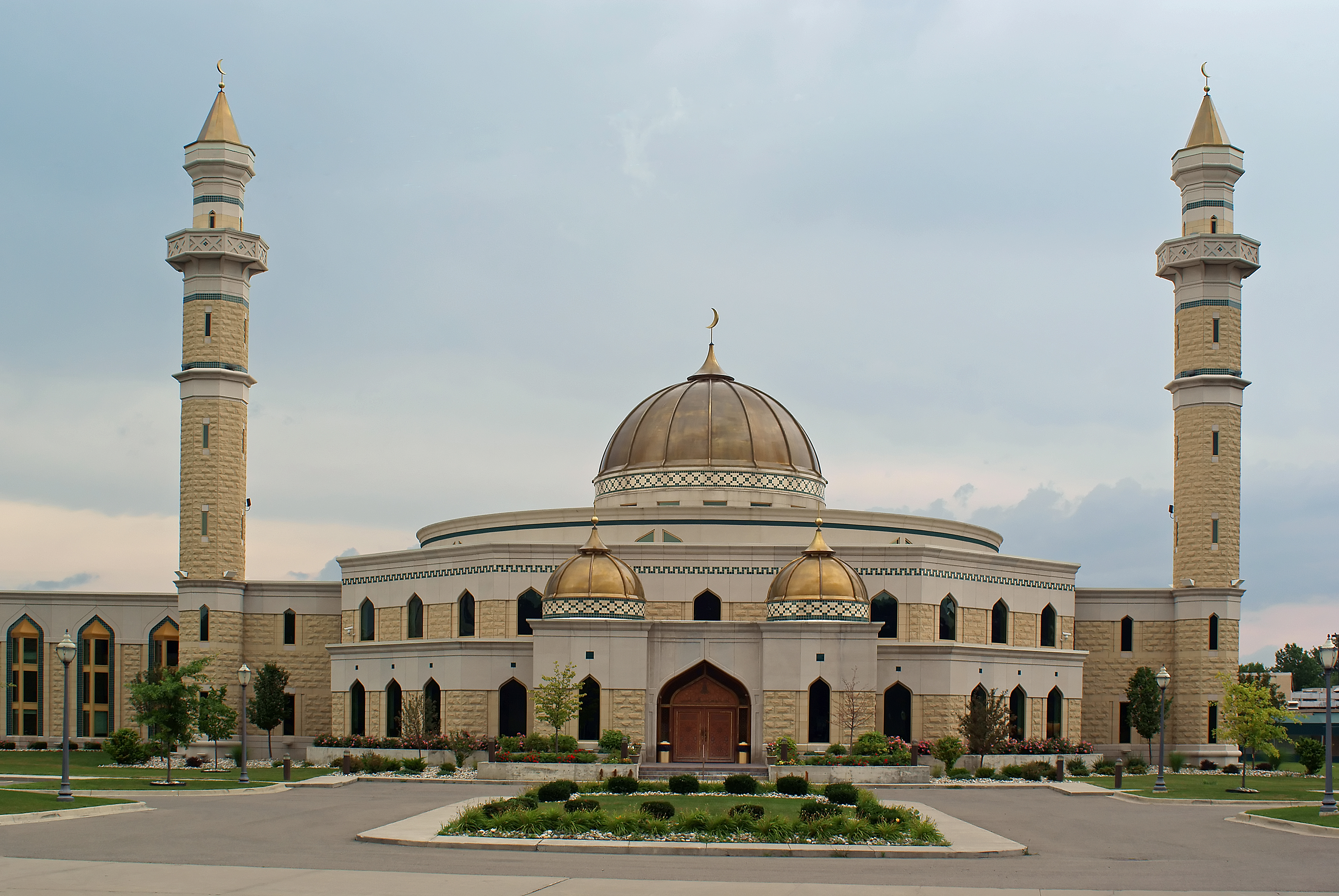
Islamic Center of America, Dearborn, Michigan

Muslim political organizations lobby on behalf of various Muslim political interests. Organizations such as the American Muslim Council are actively engaged in upholding human and civil rights for all Americans.

- The Council on American–Islamic Relations (CAIR) is the United States largest Muslim civil rights and advocacy group, originally established to promote a positive image of Islam and Muslims in America. CAIR presents itself as representing mainstream, moderate Islam, and has condemned acts of terrorism and has been working in collaboration with the White House on "issues of safety and foreign policy." The group has been criticized for alleged links to Islamic terrorism and it has been designated as a terrorist group by the United Arab Emirates.
- The Muslim Public Affairs Council (MPAC) is an American Muslim public service and policy organization headquartered in Los Angeles and with offices in Washington, D.C. MPAC was founded in 1988. The mission of MPAC "encompasses promoting an American Muslim identity, fostering an effective grassroots organization, and training a future generation of men and women to share our vision. MPAC also works to promote an accurate portrayal of Islam and Muslims in mass media and popular culture, educating the American public (both Muslim and non-Muslim) about Islam, building alliances with diverse communities and cultivating relationships with opinion- and decision-makers."
- The American Islamic Congress is a small secular Muslim organization that promotes "religious pluralism". Their official Statement of Principles states that "Muslims have been profoundly influenced by their encounter with America. American Muslims are a minority group, consisting largely of immigrants and children of immigrants, who have prospered in America's climate of religious tolerance and civil rights. The lessons of our unprecedented experience of acceptance and success must be carefully considered by our community." The AIC holds an annual essay writing competition, the Dream Deferred Essay Contest, focusing on civil rights in the Middle East.
- The Free Muslims Coalition states it was created to "eliminate broad base support for Islamic extremism and terrorism" and to strengthen secular democratic institutions in the Middle East and the Muslim World by supporting Islamic reformation efforts.
- Muslims for Bush was an advocacy group aiming to drum up support from Muslims for President George W. Bush. It was co-founded by Muhammad Ali Hasan and his mother Seeme, who were prominent donors to the Republican Party. In 2010, co-founder Muhammad Ali Hasan left the Republican Party. Muslims for Bush has since been reformed into the bipartisan Muslims for America.
- American Muslim Political Action Committee (AMPAC) was created in July 2012 by MD Rabbi Alam, a Bangladeshi-born American politician. This newly created organization is one of America's largest Muslim civil liberties advocacy organizations. It is headquartered in Kansas City, Missouri, with two regional offices in New York City and Madison, Wisconsin. AMPAC a bipartisan political platform for Muslim Americans to participate in political races. AMPAC presents an Islamic perspective on issues of importance to the American public, and seeks to empower the American Muslim community and encourage its social and political activism. On September 11, 2013, AMPAC organized the Million Muslim March which took place at the National Mall in Washington, D.C.
- The Islamic Center of Passaic County, the American Arab Civic Organization, and the American Muslim Union, all based in Paterson, New Jersey, voice Muslims' opposition to terrorism, including the November 2015 Paris attacks.
- In November 2022, Nabeela Syed was elected as the first state legislature. In the Illinois 51st district, she defeated the Republican incumbent. She is also one of the very few Muslim women and youngest political figures at the age of 23.

=== Charitable ===
Charitable donations within the Muslim American community are impacted by domestic political and social climates. ISPU found in 2017 that, “23% of Muslim Americans increased their giving to organizations associated with their faith community and 18% joined, donated to, or volunteered at a civic organizations for the first time as a result of the 2016 national elections." A 2021 study showed that Muslim Americans donated more to charity than other Americans during 2020. Most of the donations were given to causes supporting poverty relief, COVID-19 relief, civil rights, and religious research.

In addition to the organizations listed above, other Muslim organizations in the United States serve more specific needs. For example, some organizations focus almost exclusively on charity work. As a response to a crackdown on Muslim charity organizations working overseas such as the Holy Land Foundation, more Muslims have begun to focus their charity efforts within the United States.

- Inner-City Muslim Action Network (IMAN) is one of the leading Muslim charity organizations in the United States. According to the Inner-City Muslim Action Network, IMAN seeks "to utilize the tremendous possibilities and opportunities that are present in the community to build a dynamic and vibrant alternative to the difficult conditions of inner city life." IMAN sees understanding Islam as part of a larger process to empower individuals and communities to work for the betterment of humanity.
- Islamic Relief USA is the American branch of Islamic Relief Worldwide, an international relief and development organization. Its stated goal is "to alleviate the suffering, hunger, illiteracy and diseases worldwide without regard to color, race or creed." They focus on development projects; emergency relief projects, such as providing aid to victims of Hurricane Katrina; orphans projects; and seasonal projects, such as food distributions during the month of Ramadan. They provide aid internationally and in the United States.
- Project Downtown is a non profit organization originated in Miami Fl. From what started as two men giving away a few sandwiches eventually turned into an array of chapters all over the United States giving away thousands of packets of food, hygiene bags, clothes, and other necessities of life to those who cannot afford it. The motto of Project Downtown is "We feed you for the sake of God alone, no reward do we seek, nor thanks." (Quran 76:9)
- Compassionate Care Network, Chicago, CCNchicago was formed 14 years ago to offer basic health screening for the uninsured population in the community. It offers health screening for obesity, hypertension, diabetes and health awareness for the indigent people. It has formed a network of 200 providers and enrolled several thousand patients. In 2014 CCN's work was recognized with honors from the Governor of Illinois and also by President Obama at the White House. In 2015 CCN was invited to participate in White House policy recommendation discussions with the US Dept of Health and Human Services Office of Faith Based and Neighborhood Partnerships.
- American Muslim Health Professionals is a nonprofit organization, founded in 2004, which aims to unite Muslim health professionals and provide information on health. They also provide information on mental health. Another of their goals is to connect Muslim Americans to affordable insurance and free health clinics.

=== Cultural ===
There are two museums dedicated to the history of Islamic culture in the U.S. and abroad. The International Museum of Muslim Cultures in Jackson, Mississippi opened in early 2001. America's Islamic Heritage Museum, in Washington, D.C., opened on April 30, 2011.

There are also numerous cultural organizations centering the Muslim community in the U.S.

- Muslim Writers Collective (MWC) is one of the leading Muslim arts and culture organizations in the United States, founded in 2014 in New York City, and holding monthly open mics across the country. According to a Vice magazine article published in 2016, "At a time when Islamophobia has reached new virulent and violent heights, MWC provides a space for young Muslims to honor their humanity."

=== Research and think tanks ===
The Institute for Social Policy and Understanding, with offices in Dearborn, MI and Washington, DC, is an independent, nonpartisan research organization specializing in addressing the most pressing challenges facing the American Muslim community and in bridging the information gap between the American Muslim community and the wider society.

== Views ==
=== Religiosity ===
A nationwide survey conducted in 2003 by the Pew Research Center and the Pew Forum on Religion and Public Life reported that the percentage of Americans with an unfavorable view of Islam increased by one percentage point between 2002 and 2003 to 34%, and then by another two percentage points in 2005 to 36%. At the same time the percentage responding that Islam was more likely than other religion to encourage violence fell from 44% in July 2003 to 36% in July 2005.

July 2007 Newsweek survey of non-Muslim Americans
Statement	Agree	Disagree
Muslims in the United States are as loyal to the U.S. as they are to Islam	40%	32%
Muslims do not condone violence	63%	
Qur'an does not condone violence	40%	28%
Muslim culture does not glorify suicide		41%
Concern about Islamic radicals		54%
Support wiretapping by FBI		52%
American Muslims more "peaceable" than non-American ones	52%	7%
Muslims are unfairly targeted by law enforcement	38%	52%
Oppose mass detentions of Muslims	60%	25%
Believe most are immigrants		52%
Would allow son or daughter to date a Muslim	64%	
Muslim students should be allowed to wear headscarves	69%	23%
Would vote for a qualified Muslim for political office	45%	45%

The July 2005 Pew survey also showed that 59% of American adults view Islam as "very different from their religion," down one percentage point from 2003. In the same survey 55% had a favorable opinion of Muslim Americans, up four percentage points from 51% in July 2003. A December 2004 Cornell University survey shows that 47% of Americans believe that the Islamic religion is more likely than others to encourage violence among its believers.

A CBS April 2006 poll showed that, in terms of faiths

- 58% of Americans have favorable attitudes toward Protestantism/Other Christians
- 48% favorable toward Catholicism
- 47% favorable toward Judaism
- 31% favorable toward Christian fundamentalism
- 20% favorable toward Mormonism
- 19% favorable toward Islam
- 8% favorable toward Scientology

The Pew survey shows that, in terms of adherents

- 77% of Americans have favorable opinions of Jews
- 73% favorable of Catholics
- 57% favorable of "evangelical Christians"
- 55% favorable of Muslims
- 35% favorable of Atheists

Pew surveys conducted in 2014, 2017, and 2019 continued this trend showing Americans had the least favorable views toward Muslims and Atheists.

A 2011 Gallup poll found that 56% of Protestants, 63% of Catholics, and 70% of Jews believed that American Muslims had no sympathy for Al Qaeda. A 2015 Brookings poll found that 14% Americans believe most Muslims support ISIS and another 44% believe Muslims partially support ISIS. Political party also plays a role in whether Americans believe Islam encourages violence. Over the years, Republicans have become more likely to state they believe Islam encourages violence more than other religions, while Democrats are more likely to say it does not.

A 2016 poll found that on average; Americans believed that 17% of the US population was Muslim and that this number would rise to 23% by 2020.

A 2018 poll by The Institute for Social Policy and Understanding found that 86% of Americans report wanting to, “live in a country where no one is targeted for their religious identity.” 95% of American Jews and 78% of white Evangelicals agreed. The study also found that 66% of Americans agree that “the negative things politicians say regarding Muslims is harmful to our country.” Breaking down the results by faith community, 78% of Muslims and non-affiliated Americans agreed, contrasted with only 45% of white Evangelicals. Most Americans oppose banning the building of mosques (79%), the surveillance of U.S. mosques (63%), and a ‘Muslim Ban’ (~63%). Most Americans also take issue with the collective blaming of Muslims for the acts of individuals, and 69% of those surveyed believe Muslims are no more responsible for violence carried out by a Muslim than anyone else. ISPU writes that, “Though at a lower rate, the majority of Americans (55%) say that most Muslims living in the United States are committed to the well-being of America.”

According to a research by the New America foundation and the American Muslim Initiative found in 2018, 56 percent of Americans believed Islam was compatible with American values and 42 percent said it was not. About 60 percent believed US Muslims were as patriotic as others, while 38 percent they were not. The study found that a big majority of Americans – 74 percent – accepted there was "a lot" of bigotry against Muslims. Researchers found that Republicans were more likely to hold negative perceptions of Muslims with 71 percent.

A 2021 Pew study found that 78% of Americans believe Muslims face discrimination, which was a higher percentage than for other religions.

=== Views on the society of the United States ===
Pew's poll of views on American Society
Statement	U.S. Muslim	General public
Agree that one can get ahead with hard work	71%	64%
Rate their community as "excellent" or "good"	72%	82%
Excellent or good personal financial situation	42%	49%
Satisfied with the state of the U.S.	38%	32%

In a 2007 survey titled Muslim Americans: Middle Class and Mostly Mainstream, the Pew Research Center found that Muslim Americans were "largely integrated, happy with their lives, and moderate with respect to many of the issues that have divided Muslims and Westerners around the world."

47% of respondents said they considered themselves Muslims first and Americans second. However, this was compared to 81% of British Muslims and 69% of German Muslims, when asked the equivalent question. A similar disparity exists in income, the percentage of American Muslims living in poverty is 2% higher than the general population, compared to an 18% disparity for French Muslims and 29% difference for Spanish Muslims.

Politically, American Muslims both supported larger government and are socially conservative. Despite their social conservatism, 71% of American Muslims expressed a preference for the Democratic Party. The Pew Research survey also showed that nearly three quarters of respondents believed that American society rewards them for hard work regardless of their religious background.

The same poll reported that 40% of U.S. Muslims believe that Arab Muslims carried out the 9/11 attacks. Another 28% do not believe it and 32% said they had no opinion. Among the 28% who doubted that Arab Muslims were behind the conspiracy, one-fourth said the U.S. government or President George W. Bush was responsible. 26% of American Muslims believe the U.S.-led "war on terror" is a sincere effort to root out international terrorism. 5% of those surveyed had a "very favorable" or "somewhat favorable" view of Al-Qaeda. 35% of American Muslims stated that the decision for military action in Afghanistan was the right one and 12% supported the use of military force in Iraq.

Although American Muslims do report feeling discriminated against as a religious minority, they are just as likely as the general public (81%) to say they value their American Identity. In fact, a 2018 study done by the Institute for Social Policy and Understanding asserts that, “a higher religious identity correlates with a higher American identity among all Americans, especially Muslims.”

=== LGBTQ ===
American Muslims in the 2000s and early 2010s showed generally conservative views about homosexuality, with only about 27% of American Muslims saying it should be accepted by society in 2007, compared to 51% of the entire US public in 2006, according to the Pew Research Center. However, this later rose to 39% in 2011 (compared to 58% of the entire US public), and eventually in 2017, rising to a majority at 52% of American Muslims approving of societal acceptance of homosexuality, on par with the approval of Protestants, although lower than the total US public approval rate of 63%.

A 2017 survey by the Public Religion Research Institute showed that a slim majority of Muslims at 51% supported gay marriage, compared to 34% opposed.

Hamtramck, Michigan the only Muslim-majority city in the United States and the first city to have a Muslim-majority city council in the history of the United States, with the mayor and all the six council members being Muslim. In June 2023, the city drew scrutiny for its ban of the rainbow flag on city property and perceived homophobia.

== Concerns and perceptions ==
A 2011 Pew poll reported support for extremism among Muslim Americans is negligible. The poll indicated all segments of the Muslim American population were opposed to violence and to a correlation between support for suicide bombing and religiosity measures. A 2007 Pew poll reported that very few Muslim Americans (1%) supported suicide bombings against civilian targets in at least some circumstances, with 81% reporting that suicide bombings and other forms of violence against civilians are never justified. Favorable views towards Al Qaeda were held by a comparably smaller percentage among Muslim Americans, 2% very favorable and 3% somewhat favorable. 15% of American Muslims under the age of 30 supported suicide bombings against civilian targets in at least some circumstances, on the other hand, 11% said it could be "rarely justified" in a 2007 Pew poll. Among those over the age of 30, just 6% expressed their support for the same. 9% of Muslims over 30 and 5% under 30 chose not to answer.

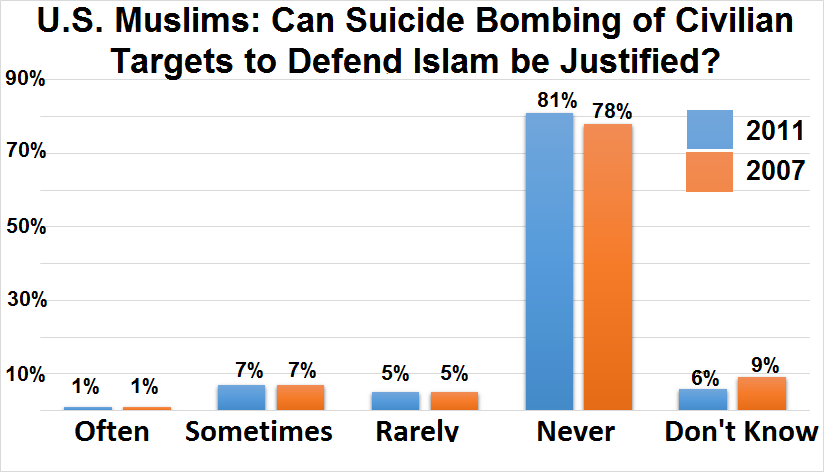
Based on data from a 2011 poll by the Pew Research Center, this graph records the distribution of feelings of U.S. Muslims on the topic of suicide bombings.

Terrorism that involved Muslim perpetrators began in the United States with the 1993 shootings at CIA Headquarters in Langley, Virginia, followed by the 1993 World Trade Center bombing in New York City. After the September 11 attacks and the start of the Afghanistan war in 2001, there was concern about the potential radicalization of American Muslims.

Between 2001 and the end of 2009, there were 46 publicly reported incidents of "domestic radicalization and recruitment to jihadist terrorism" that involved at least 125 people between 2001 and the end of 2009. There had been an average of six cases per year since 2001, but that rose to 13 in 2009.

While the seeming increase in cases may be alarming, half "involve single individuals, while the rest represent ‘tiny conspiracies,’ " according to Congressional testimony. Furthermore, a 2012 study by the University of North Carolina indicated that the yearly number of cases of alleged plots by Muslim-Americans appears to be declining. The total of 20 indictments for terrorism in 2011 is down from 26 in 2010 and 47 in 2009 (the total since 9/11 is 193). The number of Muslim-Americans indicted for support of terrorism also fell, from 27 individuals in 2010 to just eight in 2011 (the total since 9/11 stands at 462). Also in apparent decline is the number of actual attacks: Of the 20 suspects indicted for terrorism, only one was charged with carrying out a terrorist act. This number is down from the six individuals charged with attacks in 2010.

Muslim Americans are significantly represented among those who tip authorities off to alleged plots having given 52 of the 140 documented tips regarding individuals involved in violent terrorist plots since 9/11 up to 2012.

The Boston Marathon bombing in 2013 caused 280 injuries, and 5 civilian and police deaths. Attempted attacks, like the Curtis Culwell Center attack and 2015 Boston beheading plot have attracted substantial media coverage and inflamed community relations. In 2015 the New America Foundation released information about violent extremist groups in the US. While the Boston Marathon bombing had a high injury toll, only four deaths were counted by the group, and the group's count of only deaths from violent extremism showed that since 9/11, 48 people had been killed by anti-government extremists, compared to 28 by Jihadists.

Some Muslim Americans have been criticized because of perceived conflicts between their religious beliefs and mainstream American value systems. Muslim cab drivers in Minneapolis, Minnesota have been criticized for refusing passengers for carrying alcoholic beverages or dogs. The Minneapolis-Saint Paul International Airport authority has threatened to revoke the operating authority of any driver caught discriminating in this manner. There are reported incidents in which Muslim cashiers have refused to sell pork products to their clientele.

=== Jihadist extremism ===
In 2002, John Walker Lindh was convicted on charges of working with the Taliban and carrying weapons against American soldiers. He had converted to Islam while in the United States, moved to Yemen to study Arabic, and then went to Pakistan, where he was recruited by the Taliban.

José Padilla, a Hispanic-American, was convicted and imprisoned on suspicion of plotting a radiological bomb ("dirty bomb") attack. After marrying a Muslim woman, Padilla converted to Islam and moved to the Middle East. While living in the Middle East from 2001 to early 2002, he was recruited and trained by al-Qaeda. On May 8, 2002, he was detained in Chicago. President George W. Bush designated him an enemy combatant and, arguing that he was not entitled to trial in civilian courts, had him transferred to a military prison.

In 2015, a 24-year-old Kuwaiti man, Mohammad Youssef Abdulazeez, a naturalized US citizen with an engineering degree, killed four U.S. Marines and injured three at two facilities in Chattanooga, Tennessee.

=== Islamophobia ===
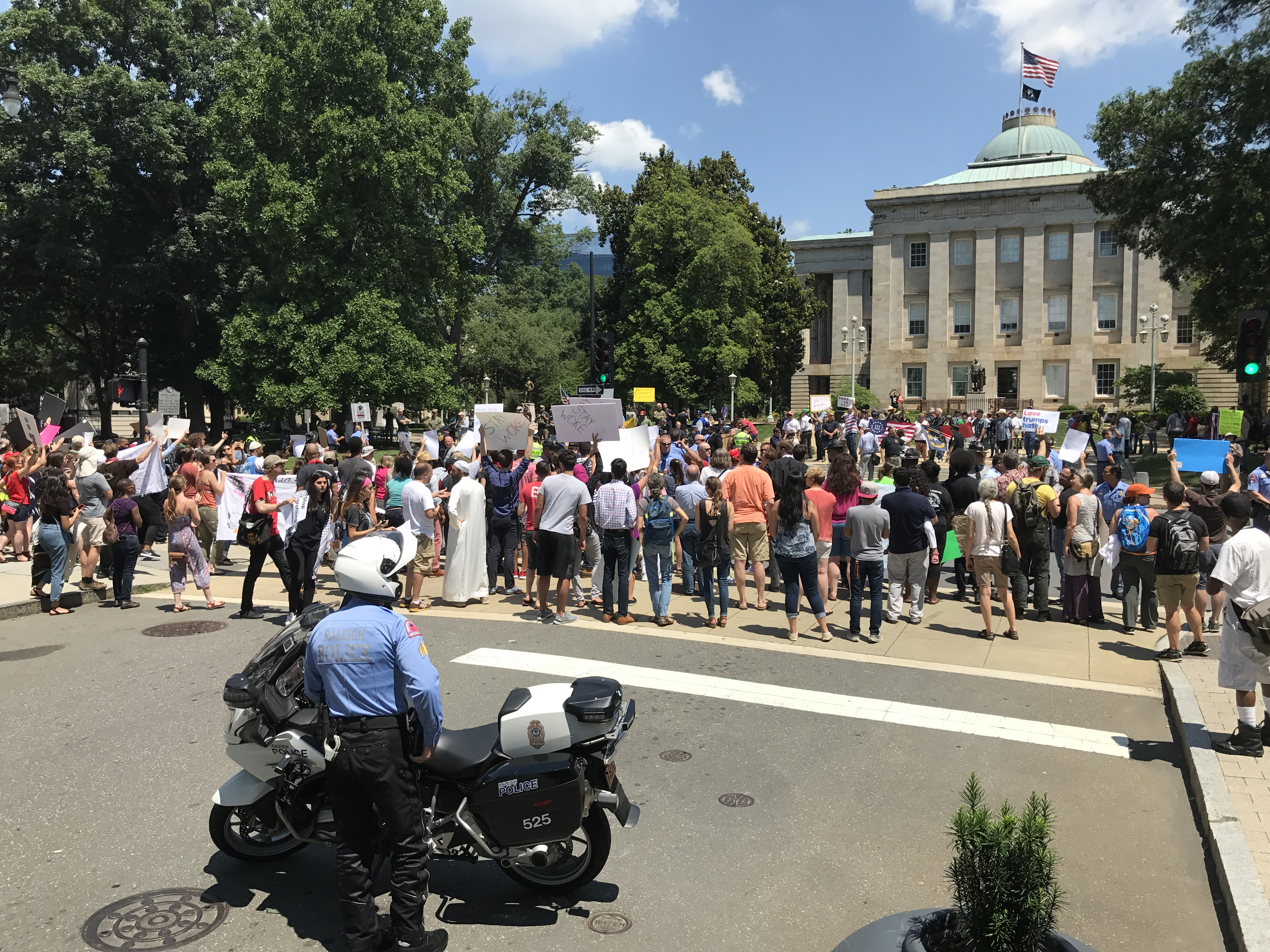
An anti-Sharia protest in Raleigh, North Carolina, June 10, 2017

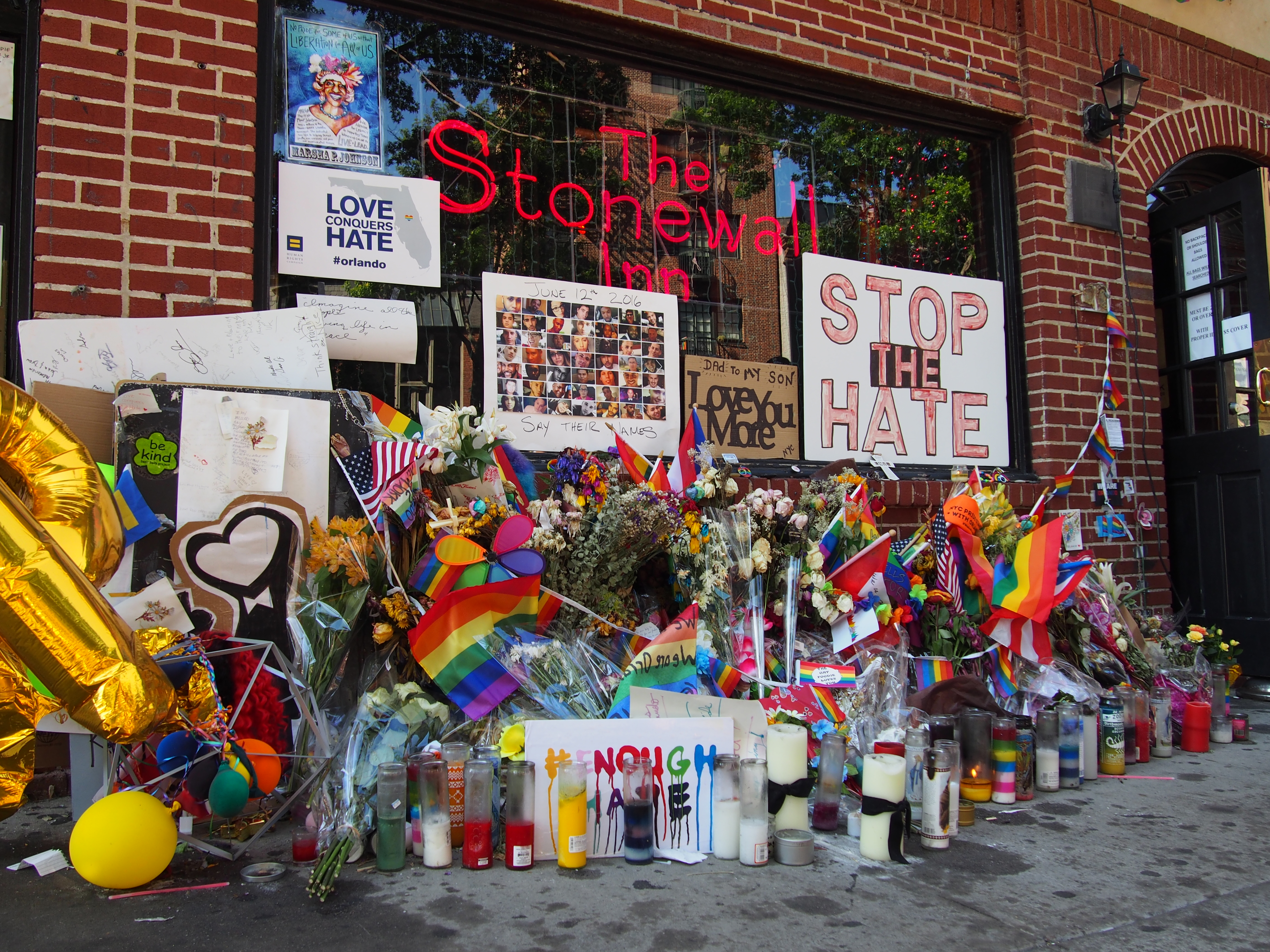
A memorial for the 2016 Orlando nightclub shooting

In the first half of 2024, anti-Muslim incidents rose about 70% amid the war in Gaza. According to a 2011 Gallup poll, over the preceding decade, there had been an increase in Islamophobia, which it defined as "an exaggerated fear, hatred, and hostility toward Islam and Muslims that is perpetuated by negative stereotypes resulting in bias, discrimination, and the marginalization and exclusion of Muslims from social, political, and civic life." Another 2011 poll provided by The Washington Post through the Public Religion Research Institute states that 48 percent of Americans are uncomfortable with Muslim women wearing the burqa. A 2014 Pew Research Center survey found that Muslims were the most disliked religious group in the United States with an average "cold" rating of 40 (out of 100), which is lower than the 41 cold ratings received by atheists. According to a poll in November 2015 by the Public Religion Research Institute 56 percent of Americans believe that the values of Islam are at odds with the American values and ways of life.

Public institutions in the U.S. have also drawn fire for accommodating Islam at the expense of taxpayers. The University of Michigan–Dearborn and a public college in Minnesota have been criticized for accommodating Islamic prayer rituals by constructing footbaths for Muslim students using taxpayer money. Critics said this special accommodation, which is made to satisfy the needs of Muslims alone, is a violation of Constitutional provisions separating church and state. Along the same constitutional lines, in 2007 a San Diego public elementary school was criticized for making special accommodations, specifically for American Muslims, by adding Arabic to its curriculum and giving breaks for Muslim prayers. Some critics said exceptions have not been made for any religious group in the past, and they see this as an endorsement of Islam.

The first American Muslim Congressman, Keith Ellison, created controversy when he compared President George W. Bush's actions after the September 11, 2001 attacks to Adolf Hitler's actions after the Nazi-sparked Reichstag fire, saying that Bush was exploiting the aftermath of 9/11 for political gain, as Hitler had exploited the Reichstag fire to suspend constitutional liberties. The United States Holocaust Memorial Museum and the Anti-Defamation League condemned Ellison's remarks. The congressman later retracted the statement, saying that it was "inappropriate" for him to have made the comparison.

In April 2018, former President Donald Trump instigated a ban on Muslim immigration to America that still reverberates today. America had already some of the lowest percentages (about 1.1% of the total US population) of Muslims among Western nations, and with the ban in 2018, many African Muslims were also barred from traveling to the U.S. or seeking refuge there. The ban had a dramatic impact, but the measure was immediately rescinded in 2021, when Joe Biden took office. Muslim Americans, rights advocates and immigration experts, however, say the policy continues to have a lingering effect on Muslim citizens, as well as on their family members living abroad, unable to join their loved ones in America.

=== 2018 ISPU Poll ===
Islamophobia Index
Most Muslims living in the United States... (% Net agree shown)	Muslim	Jewish	Catholic	Protestant	White Evangelical	Non-Affiliated	General Public
Are more prone to violence	18%	15%	12%	13%	23%	8%	13%
Discriminate against women	12%	23%	29%	30%	36%	18%	26%
Are hostile to the United States	12%	13%	9%	14%	23%	8%	12%
Are less civilized than other people	8%	6%	4%	6%	10%	1%	6%
Are partially responsible for acts of violence carried out by other Muslims	10%	16%	11%	12%	14%	8%	12%
Index (0 min – 100 max)	17	22	22	31	40	14	24

Pride Index
My faith identity/ community... (% Net agree shown)	Muslim	Jewish	Catholic	Protestant	White Evangelical	Non-Affiliated	General Public
Is a source of happiness	85%	72%	73%	81%	94%	34%	68%
Contributes to society	85%	91%	78%	79%	95%	44%	71%
Makes me proud	86%	87%	85%	83%	95%	37%	72%
Index	87	86	82	85	93	58	78

In the American Muslim Poll 2018, the Institute for Social Policy and Understanding set out "to measure the level of public anti-Muslim sentiment" in the United States. The following graph shows data across six different faith populations in the United States, and their answers to the two questions below ("W. Evang." is short for White Evangelical, the specific demographic surveyed):

Question 1: Some people think that for the military to target and kill civilians is sometimes justified, while others think that this kind of violence is never justified. Which is your opinion?

Question 2: Some people think that for an individual or a small group of people to target and kill civilians is sometimes justified, while others think that this kind of violence is never justified. Which is your opinion?

- Question 1 (% Never Justified)
- Question 2 (% Never Justified)

The following graph contains additional data collected by ISPU during their 2018 poll. The following statements were posed to participants and they were asked to answer on a scale from strongly agree to strongly disagree. The chart below shows the total percentage from each American faith demographic that agreed with the statements below. (Note: "W. Evang." is short for White Evangelical, the specific demographic surveyed.)

Question 1: I want to live in a country where no one is targeted for their religious identity

Question 2: The negative things politicians say regarding Muslims is harmful to our country

Question 3: Most Muslims living in the United States are committed to the wellbeing of America

Question 4: Most people associate negative stereotypes with my faith identity

- Question 1 (% Net agree)
- Question 2 (% Net agree)
- Question 3 (% Net agree)
- Question 4 (% Net agree)

=== Prejudice ===
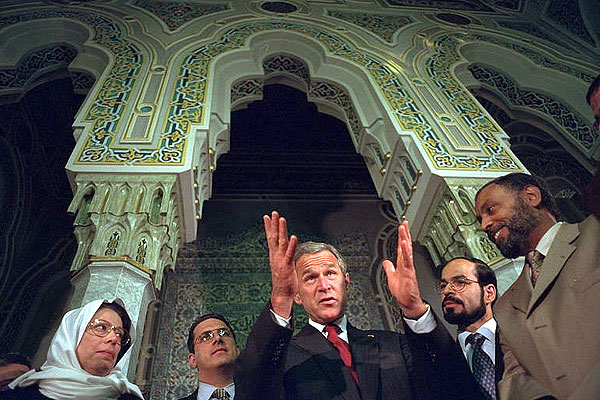
President George W. Bush inside the Islamic Center of Washington, D.C.

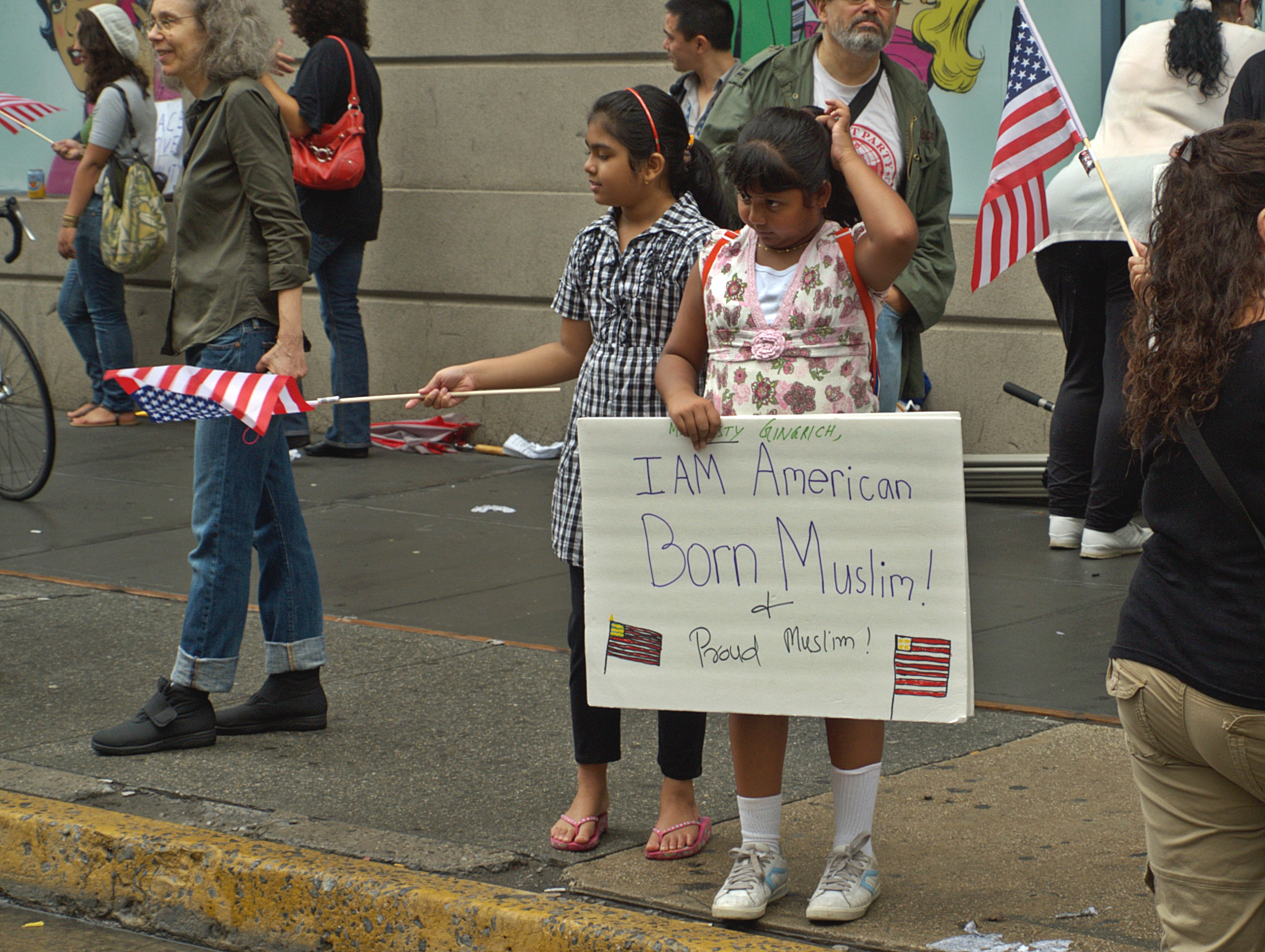
Muslim children in New York City supporting Park51.

After the September 11 attacks, America saw an increase in the number of hate crimes committed against people who were perceived to be Muslim, particularly those of Middle Eastern and South Asian descent. More than 20 acts of discrimination and violence were documented in the post 9/11 era by the U.S. Department of Justice. Some of these acts were against Muslims living in America. Other acts were against those accused of being Muslims, such as Sikhs, and people of Arabian and South-Asian backgrounds. A publication in Journal of Applied Social Psychology found evidence that the number of anti-Muslim attacks in America in 2001 increased from 354 to 1,501 following 9/11. The same year, the Arab American Institute reported an increase in anti-Muslim hate crimes ranging from discrimination and destruction of private property to violent threats and assaults, some of which resulted in deaths.

In a 2007 survey, 53% of American Muslims reported that it was more difficult to be a Muslim after the 9/11 attacks. Asked to name the most important problem facing them, the options named by more than ten percent of American Muslims were discrimination (19%), being viewed as a terrorist (15%), public's ignorance about Islam (13%), and stereotyping (12%). 54% believe that the U.S. government's anti-terrorism activities single out Muslims. 76% of surveyed Muslim Americans stated that they are very or somewhat concerned about the rise of Islamic extremism around the world, while 61% express a similar concern about the possibility of Islamic extremism in the United States.

On a small number of occasions Muslim women who wore distinctive hijab were harassed, causing some Muslim women to stay at home, while others temporarily abandoned the practice. In November 2009 Amal Abusumayah, a mother of four young girls, had her hijab pulled following derogatory comments while grocery shopping. In 2006, one California woman was shot dead as she walked her child to school; she was wearing a headscarf and relatives and Muslim leaders believe that the killing was religiously motivated. While 51% of American Muslims express worry that women wearing hijab will be treated poorly, 44% of American Muslim women who always wear hijab express a similar concern.

In 2011, The Learning Channel (TLC) broadcast a television series, All-American Muslim, depicting the lives of different American Muslims in Dearborn, Michigan.

Even 16 years after 9/11, studies show that 42% Muslim Americans report bullying of their children in school because of their faith. One in four bullying incidents involving Muslims is rerouted to have involved a teacher or other school official. Policies regarding immigration and airport security have also impacted Muslim American lives after 9/11, with Muslims being twice as likely as any other faith group surveyed to be stopped at the border for additional screening. 67% of Muslims who were stopped at a US border also reported that they were easily identifiable as a member of their faith group. The climate of the 2016 presidential election and the policies that followed have also affected the lives and sentiments of Muslims Americans when it comes to their own safety. Muslims and Jews are, “most likely to express fear for their personal safety or that of their family from white supremacist groups as a result of the 2016 elections.” Overall, the majority of nonwhite Muslims do report some level of race-based discrimination in the past year. When it comes to religious based discrimination, Muslim Americans as a whole were the most likely faith group to report it.

== See also ==
- Islam in the Americas
- Islam in New York City
- Islam in Canada
- Ahmadiyya in the United States
- List of American Muslims
- List of Islamic and Muslim related topics
- List of mosques in the United States
- Latino Muslims
- Religious school
- United States military chaplain symbols (including images of U.S. Army, Navy, and Air Force Muslim Chaplain insignia)
- American Islam (term)
- EPIC City, Texas

== Primary sources ==
- Curtis IV, Edward E., ed. The Columbia Sourcebook of Muslims in the United States (2007), 472 pp.
