= Legality of polygamy in the United States =

Polygamy was outlawed in federal territories by the 1882 Edmunds Act, and there are laws against the practice in all 50 states, as well as the District of Columbia, Guam, and Puerto Rico. Because state laws exist, polygamy is not actively prosecuted at the federal level.

Many US courts (e.g. Turner v. State, 212 Miss. 590, 55 So.2d 228) treat bigamy as a strict liability crime: in some jurisdictions, a person can be convicted of a felony even if they reasonably believed they had only one legal spouse. For example, if a person has the mistaken belief that their previous spouse is dead or that their divorce is final, they can still be convicted of bigamy if they marry a new person.

== Federal law ==
According to the Edmunds Act, bigamy is punishable by "a fine of not more than five hundred dollars and by imprisonment for a term of not more than five years". However, because state laws exist, polygamy is not actively prosecuted at the federal level, but the practice is considered "against public policy".

== Legislation ==
=== Anti-polygamy bill of 1854 ===
The first legislative attempt to discourage polygamy in Utah was presented in the 33rd Congress and was debated in May 1854. The bill included the provision that any man who had more than one wife would not be able to own land in the Utah Territory. This bill was defeated in the House of Representatives after multiple representatives argued that the federal government did not have the authority to legislate morals in the states.

=== 1862 Morrill Anti-Bigamy Act ===
In 1862, the Morrill Anti-Bigamy Act became law. The act criminalized the practice of polygamy, unincorporated the Church of Jesus Christ of Latter-day Saints (LDS Church), and limited the church's real estate holdings. According to an article in the Virginia Law Review, legislators did not actually believe that the bill would end polygamy. Speeches given during the debate did not include an explanation of how the bill would eliminate or decrease polygamy in Utah. Despite many members of Congress knowing that the bill would be ineffective, Morrill (the sponsor of the bill) encouraged his fellow legislators to pass the bill in its current state.

Legislators did not explain why they felt the bill would be ineffective. One of the weaknesses listed in the Virginia Law Review is that the law required prosecutors to present an "insurmountable burden of proof." Legislators were also concerned that jury nullification would prevent polygamists from being convicted. The act was largely understood to be unconstitutional and was only enforced in rare cases. While the act outlawed bigamy in the US territories, it was seen to be largely weak and ineffective at preventing people from practicing polygamy. However, due to the continuous threat of legislation targeting polygamy and the church, Brigham Young pretended to comply.

On January 6, 1879, the Supreme Court upheld the Morrill Anti-Bigamy Act in Reynolds v. United States.

=== Wade, Cragin, and Cullom Bills ===
The Wade, Cragin, and Cullom Bills were anti-bigamy legislation that failed to pass in the US Congress. The bills were all intended to enforce the Morrill Act's prohibition on polygamy with more punitive measures. The Wade Bill of 1866 had the power to dismantle local government in Utah. Three years after the Wade Bill failed, the Cragin Bill, which would have eliminated the right to a jury for bigamy trials, also did not pass.

Following the failures of the Wade and Cragin Bills, the Cullom Bill was introduced. The Cullom Bill would have prevented those practicing polygamy from voting, serving on a jury, holding public office, becoming a citizen of the United States, and receiving the benefits of the homestead laws.

The leadership of the LDS Church publicly opposed the Cullom Bill. Op-eds in church-owned newspapers described the bill as unjust and dangerous to Mormons. The introduction of the Cullom Bill led to protests by Mormons, particularly women. Mormon women organized indignation meetings to voice their disapproval of the bill. The strong reaction of women surprised many onlookers and politicians. Outside of the church, Mormon women were seen as weak and oppressed by their husbands and the men of the church. The political activism in support of polygamy of Mormon women was unexpected as they had been portrayed as powerless.

Despite a Republican-dominated Congress, the Cullom Bill failed in the Senate in 1870.

=== 1874 Poland Act ===
Following the failure of the Wade, Cragin, and Collum Bills, the Poland Act was an anti-bigamy prosecution act that was successfully enacted by the 43rd United States Congress. The Poland Act, named after its sponsor in the US House of Representatives, attempted to prosecute Utah under the Morrill Anti-Bigamy act for refusing to stop practicing polygamy. The act stripped away some of Utah's powers and gave the federal government greater control over the territory. Among other powers, the act gave US district courts jurisdiction in the Utah Territory for all court cases The Poland Act was a significant threat to Mormons practicing polygamy as it allowed for men who had multiple wives to be criminally indicted.

=== 1882 Edmunds Act ===
The Edmunds Act was passed by Congress in 1882, amending the Morrill Act and made polygamy a felony punishable by a $500 fine and five years in prison. "Unlawful cohabitation", in which the prosecution did not need to prove that a marriage ceremony had taken place (only that a couple had lived together), was a misdemeanor punishable by a $300 fine and six months imprisonment. It also revoked the right of polygamists to vote or hold office and allowed them to be punished without due process.

=== 1887 Edmunds–Tucker Act ===
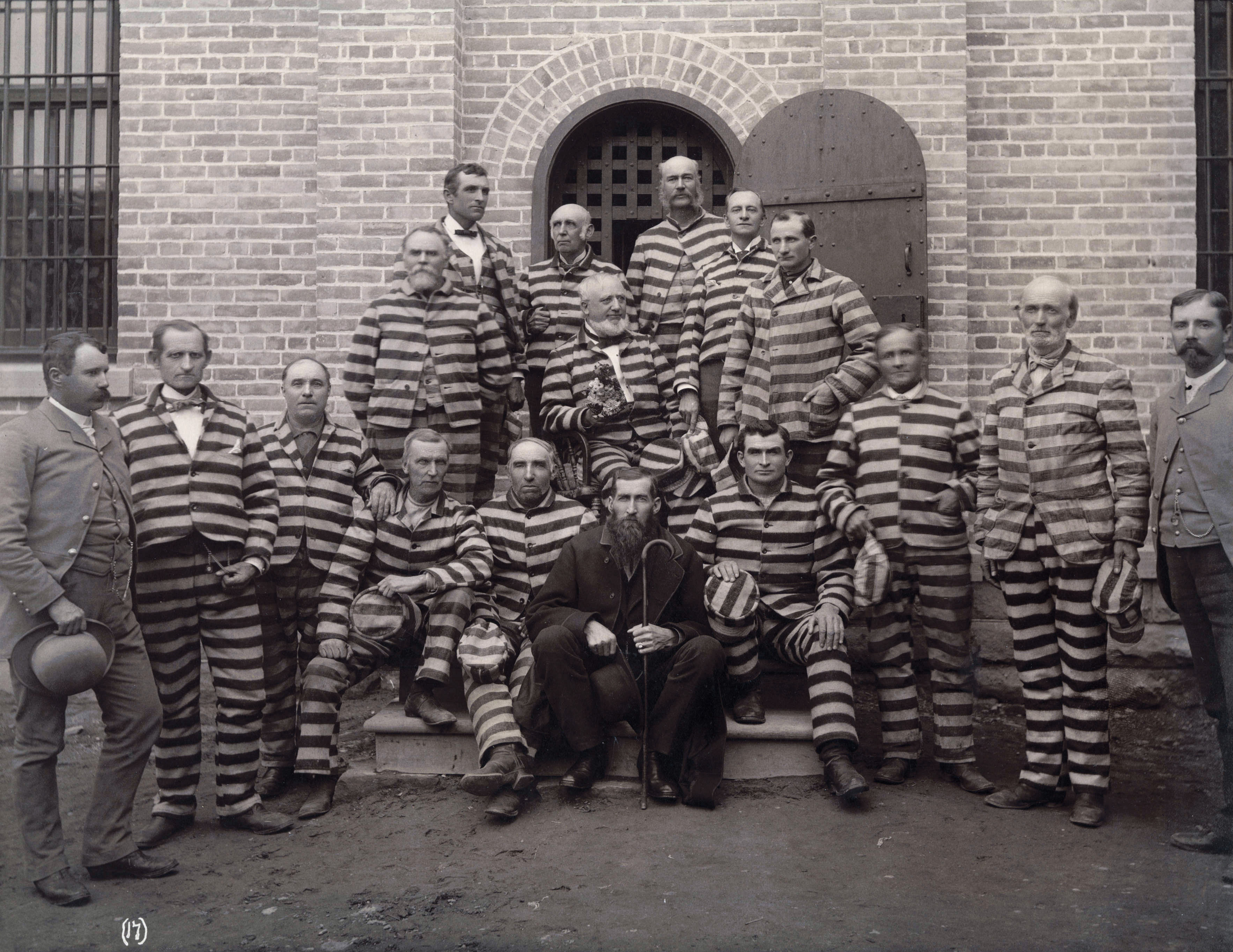
Polygamists, including George Q. Cannon, imprisoned under the Edmunds–Tucker Act, at the Utah Penitentiary in 1889.

The Edmunds–Tucker Act of 1887 allowed the disincorporation of the LDS Church and the seizure of church property; it also further extended the punishments of the Edmunds Act. Those convicted of practicing polygamy would be subject to a fine. Under the Edmunds-Tucker Act, around 1300 men were imprisoned for practicing polygamy.

== Court cases ==
=== 1879 Reynolds vs. United States ===
In 1879, the Supreme Court ruled that a defendant cannot claim a religious obligation as a valid defense to a crime and upheld the Morrill Anti-Bigamy Act in Reynolds v. United States. The Court said that while holding a religious belief was protected under the First Amendment right of freedom of religion, practicing a religious belief that broke the law was not. Reynolds vs. United States was the Supreme Court's first case in which a party used the right of freedom of religion as a defense. The ruling concluded that Mormons could be charged with committing bigamy despite their religious beliefs.

== Cohabitation clause ==
Several states have a cohabitation clause, including cohabitation within the state as a criterion for the crime. For people who have entered a polygamous marriage outside the state, such clause makes it possible to be punished again if they move to the state and cohabit, but on the other hand it can protect them if they only visit the state without cohabiting. In contrast, for states without a cohabitation clause, visitors having entered polygamy outside the state can possibly be charged with felony within the state, since the Double Jeopardy Clause (that can prevent an accused person from being tried again on the same charges following a conviction or acquittal) is not guaranteed to legally protect such visitors, as the jurisdiction is not the same as the one where they entered the polygamous relationship.

== By state ==
Bigamy laws throughout the United States Infraction Misdemeanor Felony All forms of cohabitation outlawed

In Utah, polygamy is treated as an infraction, which is punishable by a fine up to $750, compensatory service, forfeiture, disqualification, or a combination of those punishments. In other states, polygamy is usually punishable by imprisonment or a fine.

State	Punishment	Cohabitation clause
Connecticut	Class D felony	
California	A fine of up to $10,000 or by imprisonment up to 1 year.	No
Minnesota	A fine of up to $10,000 or by imprisonment up to 5 years.	Yes
Nevada	Class D felony	Yes
New York	Class E felony: Imprisonment between 1 and 5 years.	No
Utah	Infraction: A fine up to $750, compensatory service, forfeiture, disqualification, or a combination of those punishments. Second- or third-degree felony under certain circumstances. (Note: Third-degree felony "if the individual induces bigamy under fraudulent or false pretenses; or by threat or coercion." Second-degree felony if the individual cohabitates and also commits certain other felony or misdemeanor offenses.)	
Texas	Third degree felony: imprisonment between 2 and 10 years.	No
Washington D.C.	Imprisonment between 2 and 7 years, and possibly additional fines.	No

== History ==
Couples have married in the United States for centuries. For most of US history, marriages were solemnized in an ecclesiastical setting. Government-issued marriage licenses are a modern innovation. Even before the advent of licensing, many states enacted laws to prohibit plural marriage-style relationships. Early Mormons were persecuted for their practice of polygamy. No state permits its citizens to enter into more than one concurrent legally-licensed marriage. People who attempt to, or are able to, secure a second marriage license are generally prosecuted for bigamy. The terms "bigamy" and "polygamy" are sometimes confused or used interchangeably. Some states' statutes refer to polygamy while others use the bigamy term. Criminal sentences differ widely. Prosecutions for either violation are extremely rare. Polygamy is a practice difficult to define since it virtually never occurs in the context of legal licensing. Given that Mormon polygamists migrated to the Rocky Mountains in 1847, partly to escape prosecution for polygamy in the eastern states, efforts to curb the practice focused intensely on Utah and the surrounding territories in the 1800s. Utah and four other western territories were constrained to incorporate a prohibition against plural marriages in their state constitutions.

Mormon polygamy was one of the leading moral issues of the 19th century in the United States, perhaps second only to slavery in importance. Spurred by popular indignation, the U.S. government took a number of steps against polygamy; these were of varying effectiveness. In 1856, the Republican Party stated that it planned to do away with both slavery and polygamy. After multiple Congressional attempts to pass legislation, anti-polygamy laws began to pass ten years after the church publicly announced the practice of polygamy.

Given that almost no polygamists bother to seek a second marriage license, the practice of forming a family with more than one spousal-styled relationship is very difficult to criminalize. In the majority of cases, the additional partner is considered a wife in the context of religious beliefs. Legally speaking, the practice is more akin to adultery. Criminal prosecutions of adultery are rare in the United States, though it remains a crime in several states.

Utah made the practice of polygamy a felony in 1935, after the LDS Church publicly repudiated it in 1890, in a document labeled 'The Manifesto'. They similarly repudiated it in 1904 and 1910. Many convictions followed. Since the 1960s, polygamy prosecutions have been rare. Prosecutions included Robert D. Foster, Steve Bronson, Mark Easterday, Thomas Green, and Rodney Holm. The latter two prompted state supreme court challenges. Both failed. Nevertheless, Utah has remained reluctant to pursue prosecutions for polygamy per se (i.e., absent associated welfare fraud or child abuse), citing a lack of resources, difficulties obtaining convincing evidence, and an understanding that any prosecution would trigger an inevitable appeal to the higher courts. The Supreme Court's 2003 Lawrence v. Texas ruling found that all adult, consensual, non-commercial sexual activity is protected, thus weakening any attempts to prosecute families for private residential or sexual arrangements that did not seek the imprimatur of the state.

On December 13, 2013, a federal judge, spurred by the American Civil Liberties Union and other groups, struck down the parts of Utah's bigamy law that criminalized cohabitation, while also acknowledging that the state may still enforce bans on having multiple marriage licenses. The state of Utah appealed the decision, arguing that polygamist Kody Brown (whose relationships were documented in the show Sister Wives) lacked standing to bring his civil suit, since his county prosecutor, Jeff Buhman, had not followed through on any plan to prosecute the Brown family. The Tenth Circuit Court of Appeals (Denver) agreed with Utah and overturned the previous decision, thus effectively recriminalizing polygamy as a felony.

In 2020, State Senator Deidre Henderson introduced a bill reducing the penalty for polygamy from a five-year prison sentence (as a felony) to an infraction. The bill passed with overwhelming support in Utah's House and Senate. As such, polygamy was downgraded from a felony to an infraction, but it remains a felony if force, threats or other abuses are involved.

Federal legislation to outlaw the practice in federal territories was endorsed as constitutional in 1878 by the Supreme Court in Reynolds v. United States, despite the religious objections of the LDS church.

Authors such as Alyssa Rower and Samantha Slark argue that there is a case for legalizing polygamy on the basis of regulation and monitoring of the practice, legally protecting the polygamous partners and allowing them to join mainstream society instead of forcing them to hide from it when any public situation arises.

In an October 2004 op-ed for USA Today, George Washington University law professor Jonathan Turley argued that, as a simple matter of equal treatment under law, polygamy ought to be legal. Acknowledging that underage girls are sometimes coerced into polygamous marriages, Turley replied that "banning polygamy is no more a solution to child abuse than banning marriage would be a solution to spousal abuse".

Stanley Kurtz, an American conservative commentator, rejects the decriminalization and legalization of polygamy. He stated:

Marriage, as its ultramodern critics would like to say, is indeed about choosing one's partner, and about freedom in a society that values freedom. But that's not the only thing it is about. As the Supreme Court justices who unanimously decided Reynolds in 1878 understood, marriage is also about sustaining the conditions in which freedom can thrive. Polygamy in all its forms is a recipe for social structures that inhibit and ultimately undermine social freedom and democracy. A hard-won lesson of Western history is that genuine democratic self-rule begins at the hearth of the monogamous family.

In January 2015, Pastor Neil Patrick Carrick of Detroit, Michigan, brought a case (Carrick v. Snyder) against the State of Michigan that the state's ban of polygamy violates the Free Exercise and Equal Protection Clause of the U.S. Constitution. The case was dismissed for lack of standing.

== See also ==
- Legality of polygamy
- List of polygamy court cases#United States
- Polygamy in North America
- Polygamy in Christianity
