= List of polygamy court cases =

Polygamy is the state of being married to more than one person at the same time. It is illegal in many countries. The following is a list of polygamy court cases:

== Canada ==
- Reference re: Section 293 of the Criminal Code of Canada, 2011 BCSC 1588 — court opinion that prohibition of polygamy is constitutionally valid.

== France ==
- Montcho case (July 11, 1980, n°16596) — Allowed family reunification for polygamous households.

== Philippines ==
- Malaki and Salanatin-Malaki v. Philippines (2021) G.R. No. 221075 — established that the "a party to a civil marriage who converts to Islam and contracts another marriage, despite the first marriage’s subsistence, is guilty of bigamy"

== United Kingdom ==
- Hyde v. Hyde (1866) {L.R.} 1 P. & D. 130 — established the modern understanding and legal definition of marriage
- Bethell v. Hillyard (1885) 38 Ch.D. 220. [1885 B. 2119.] — a potentially polygamous marriage is void
- R v Smith 1994 15 Cr App R (S) 407 — used divorce papers to marry again
- R v Cairns [1997] 1 Cr App R (S) — used polygamy to circumvent immigration controls

== United States ==
19th century

- Reynolds v. United States, 98 U.S. 145 (1878)
- Miles v. United States, 103 U.S. 304 (1880) — established that the second wife may testify as to her husband's bigamy, because their marriage is not de jure
- Clawson v. United States, 113 U.S. 143 (1885) — established cohabitation as unlawful
- Murphy v. Ramsey, 114 U.S. 15 (1885) — Edmunds Act not ex post facto because charges were for continued cohabitation, not for the prior illegal marriage
- Clawson v. United States, 114 U.S. 477 (1885) established that when the juror list is exhausted due to challenges of jurors for being supportive of polygamy, an open venire may be used, in which the U.S. Marshal summons jurors from the body of the judicial district
- Cannon v. United States, 116 U.S. 55 (1885) — "cohabit" in criminal statue is "living together as husband and wife"
- Snow v. United States, 118 U.S. 346 (1886)
- Cannon v. United States, 118 U.S. 355 (1886)
- In re Snow, 120 U.S. 274 (1887) — multiple convictions overturned, as cohabiting was a continuous offense, and cannot be charged separately for individual years of offence
- Ex parte Hans Nielsen, 131 U.S. 176 (1889) — polygamy is not adultery
- Bassett v. United States, 137 U.S. 496 (1890) — polygamous wives can be required to testify as they are not legally wives
- Davis v. Beason, 133 U.S. 333 (1890) — upheld ban on voting and holding political office in the Idaho Territory for all members of organizations that teach or advocate polygamy
- Late Corporation of the Church of Jesus Christ of Latter-Day Saints v. United States, 136 U.S. 1 (1890) and 140 U.S. 665 (1891)

20th century

- Chatwin v. United States, 326 U.S. 455 (1946) — underaged polygamous marriage with consent not prosecutable under the Federal Kidnapping Act
- Cleveland v. United States, 329 U.S. 14 (1946) — polygamous marriage an "immoral purpose" under the Mann Act
- Musser v. Utah, 333 U.S. 95 (1948) — polygamy not religious free speech
- In re Black, 3 Utah 2d 315 (1955) [283 P.2d 887] — raising children in a polygamist household is evidence of child neglect; the state can remove and retain custody of children while their parents unlawful cohabitation continues
- Potter v. Murray City, 760 F.2d 1065 (10th Cir. 1985) — "the State is justified, by a compelling interest, in upholding and enforcing its ban on plural marriage"
- Barlow v. Blackburn, 165 Ariz. 351, 356, 798 P.2d 1360, 1365 (App.1990) — "Barlow's practice of polygamy justif[ies] revoking or suspending his peace officer certification" as "Arizona's constitutional prohibition against polygamy is valid" and "Arizona's compelling state interest [...] justifies an infringement upon Barlow's religiously-motivated conduct"
- In re Adoption of W.A.T. (a.k.a. Johanson v. Fischer), 808 P.2d 1083 (Utah 1991) — "no legitimate basis for the courts to disqualify all bigamists (polygamists) as potential adopters"
- Barlow v. Evans, 993 F.Supp. 1390 (D.Utah 1997) — Fair Housing Act prohibition of religious discrimination does not provide protection for polygamists

21st century

- State of Utah v. Green (a.k.a. State v. Green, Utah v. Green), 2004 UT 76 [99 P.3d 820] — Utah's polygamy ban upheld
- Warren Jeffs prosecution
- Brown v. Buhman, 11-cv-0652-CW (2013) — the portions of Utah's anti-polygamy laws which prohibit multiple cohabitation ruled unconstitutional, but Utah allowed to maintain its ban on multiple marriage licenses.
- Carrick v. Snyder, 5:2015cv10108, case before Michigan's Eastern District Federal brought by the Rev. Neil Patrick Carrick holding that it is a violation of the Free Exercise Clause of the First Amendment to prohibit clergy from performing same sex or polygamous wedding ceremonies.
- Collier et al v. Fox et al, 1:15-cv-00083, case brought by Nathan Collier et al. in Montana District Court, seeking a marriage license for Nathan Collier and Christine Collier. Nathan Collier had a legal marriage with Victoria Collier. The case was denied as moot.
- Mayle v. Orr et al, 17-cv-00449, brought by Kenneth Mayle in U.S. District 7 (Northern Illinois) seeking to strike Illinois laws on Bigamy, Adultery, and Fornication based on religious beliefs, practice, and philosophies of Satanism and Thelema including Enochian Sex Magick. The complaint claims these laws violate the 1st and 14th amendment of the U.S. Constitution. The case was dismissed on 4/10/2017. An attempt at an appeal was denied on 11/3/2017 based on a procedural error.

== See also ==
- Legal status of polygamy
- Legality of polygamy in the United States
- Polygamy in North America
- Short Creek raid
- YFZ Ranch § April 2008 raid
