= Bethel v Hillyard =

Bethell v Hildyard
- Court: Chancery Division
- Decided: 1885
- Citation: Bethell v Hildyard 38 Ch.D. 220.

Court membership
- Judge sitting: Striling J.

Keywords
- polygamy, marriage

Bethell v Hildyard 38 Ch.D. 220. [1885 B. 2119.] is an important legal judgment of the Chancery Division of the High Court of Justice, England. The matter heard before Justice Striling concerned succession to property by the child of a marriage contracted by Christopher Bethell, an English man in Bechuanaland South Africa with Teepoo, a Barolong woman according to the customs of the Baralong people.

The marriage was held not to be a valid marriage according to the law of England because the customs of the Baralong people permitted polygamy. The child was held not entitled to succeed to her father's property.

== Related cases ==
- Warrender v. Warrender
- Hyde v Hyde
- Hussain v Hussain (1983) Fam 26.
- Corbett v Corbett

== See also ==
- Legal status of polygamy
- List of polygamy court cases
- Void marriage
