= Kenneth William Mayle =

American activist and litigant

- Born: Detroit, USA
- Occupations: Electrical engineer, social activist
- Known for: Legal challenges

Kenneth William Mayle is known for multiple legal challenges. He is also the owner of a Guinea Hog named Chief Wiggum. He was the founder of the defunct the Satanic Temple Chicago chapter.

== Legal challenges ==
=== MAYLE V. CITY OF CHICAGO (2018) ===
Kenneth Mayle, the owner of an emotional-support Guinea hog named Chief Wiggum, sued the City of Chicago, contending that the city's restriction barring him from bringing his hog into public places violated the Americans with Disabilities Act (ADA) and the Equal Protection Clause. The district and appellate courts dismissed his claims, asserting that only dogs and miniature horses are recognized as "service animals" under ADA regulations.

Mayle's Guinea hog, Chief Wiggum, was trained to assist him with bipolar disorder, providing massage therapy during anxiety attacks and encouraging physical activity. Chicago's ADA regulations recognized only dogs and miniature horses as "service animals," thus excluding hogs. This led Mayle to file a lawsuit against the city.

In the district court, Mayle's arguments were dismissed. The court held that the ADA did not support his claim and that the exclusion of hogs was rational, refuting his equal protection argument.

On appeal, Mayle argued the ADA should recognize his hog as a service animal. The appellate court, however, upheld the initial decision. Mayle then argued that the regulation was unconstitutional, pointing out that other laws did not specify service animal species. The court dismissed this, stating the regulation was rational, citing potential disturbances and safety concerns.

The appellate court affirmed the district court's decision, ruling in favor of the City of Chicago.

=== Mayle v. Orr (2017) ===
Kenneth Mayle, acting pro se, sought to challenge Illinois' laws regarding bigamy, fornication, and adultery, citing his religious beliefs. Mayle, a Chicago resident following the religious tenets of Satanism and Thelema, claimed potential violations of Illinois' adultery, fornication, and bigamy laws based on his religious practices, which include "sex magic."

The United States District Court for the Northern District of Illinois Eastern Division dismissed Mayle's case. The court noted that existing Supreme Court rulings already addressed the bigamy issue, and Mayle did not have standing to challenge the fornication and adultery laws. Concerning the bigamy law, the court cited established Supreme Court decisions upholding such laws' constitutionality. For the fornication and adultery laws, the court assessed Mayle's standing based on Article III and found that he did not show a credible risk of prosecution due to the rare enforcement of these laws.

The court reaffirmed the constitutionality of the bigamy law, drawing from prior Supreme Court judgments. Furthermore, given Mayle's inability to present a believable threat of being prosecuted under the fornication and adultery statutes, the court dismissed these challenges.

=== Mayle v. United States et al. (2017) ===
Representing himself (pro se), Kenneth Mayle challenged the inclusion of the national motto, "In God We Trust," on U.S. currency. He argued that this motto represents a government endorsement of a monotheistic God, clashing with his non-theistic Satanist beliefs. Identifying with non-theistic Satanism, Kenneth Mayle took issue with the national motto on U.S. currency, seeing it as an opposing religious message. His challenge brought to light debates on religious freedom and the government's religious neutrality.

The United States Court of Appeals for the Seventh Circuit confirmed the district court's judgment, dismissing Mayle's case. They held that the motto on currency did not infringe upon the RFRA, the Equal Protection Clause of the Fifth Amendment, or the First Amendment's Free Speech, Free Exercise, or Establishment Clauses.

Under the Establishment Clause, the court utilized the "endorsement" approach, deciding that the motto did not favor a religion but recognized the nation’s religious heritage. For Free Speech, Mayle's claim that using currency forced him to convey a religious message was denied. The court stated that monetary transactions didn't inherently communicate messages. Regarding the Free Exercise and RFRA, the court found no substantial religious burden caused by the motto on the currency.

The Seventh Circuit upheld that "In God We Trust" on U.S. currency was constitutional. This case further defined the bounds of religious symbols in the public domain relative to individual religious and expressive freedoms.

=== Mayle v. Shah (2018) ===
n 2018, Kenneth Mayle, informed by his beliefs as a Satanist and follower of The Law of Thelema, again challenged the State of Illinois' laws against bigamy, adultery, and fornication. Asserting that these laws limited his religious practices, notably "sex magick rituals," and his desire for multiple marriages, his case was once more dismissed by the district court in "Mayle v. Shah."

Mayle argued that his religious exercises were potentially in breach of Illinois laws 720 ILCS 5/11-35 and 5/11-40. Furthermore, he expressed an intent to partake in bigamous relationships, contradicting 720 ILCS 5/11-45. After his initial challenge in "Mayle v. Orr" in 2017 was dismissed, Mayle resubmitted a similar lawsuit the subsequent year.

The Second Challenge and Appeal in Mayle v. Shah (2018): The district court reiterated its previous stance from "Mayle v. Orr": prior Supreme Court decisions upheld the constitutionality of bigamy laws, and Mayle lacked standing regarding the adultery and fornication laws due to their general non-enforcement. Mayle's appeal was initially hampered by a late submission, but the court exercised discretion and allowed it due to the minimal harm it posed.

The appellate court upheld the district court's dismissal, affirming previous conclusions from "Mayle v. Orr." They noted that the infrequent enforcement of adultery and fornication laws meant that Mayle's claims of a credible threat were untenable.

=== Mayle v. Urban Realty Works, LLC ===
In the case against Urban Realty Works, LLC, plaintiffs, represented by Joan Fenstermaker, P.C., rented an apartment under a verbal month-to-month agreement and paid rent to Demetrios Koulioufas. Accusing the defendants of Residential Landlord and Tenant Ordinance (RLTO) violations, the plaintiffs asserted claims such as unauthorized entry into the apartment and conversion of personal property. Initial rulings dismissed some claims due to the statute of limitations and others for lack of detailed allegations. Urban Realty Works and 660 Lake were deemed in default. The reasons given by the decision were, 1. Applicability of the two-year statute of limitations under section 13-202 of the Code to the plaintiffs' RLTO claims. 2. Assessment of certain complaint counts failing to state a cause of action.

The court affirmed the dismissal of counts I-VI concerning defendants Rouches and Johnstone. Additionally, the court approved the dismissal of the conversion claims in the second amended complaint. Yet, the designation "with prejudice" was overturned, granting plaintiffs an opportunity to address the flaws in their complaint. The dismissal of counts VII-XI in the second amended complaint was reversed, allowing the plaintiffs to rectify their complaint's deficiencies.

The court ascertained that the two-year limitation under section 13-202 of the Code was inapplicable to the plaintiffs' RLTO claims, with violations of sections 5-12-060 and 5-12-160 of the RLTO being viewed as remedial and subject to a five-year statute under section 13-205 of the Code. Counts I-VI didn't establish a cause against defendants Rouches and Johnstone as they weren't implicated as landlords or involved in unauthorized entry. Counts VII-XI were dismissed due to their failure to present a cause for common-law conversion. Nevertheless, the court allowed the plaintiffs a chance to amend their complaints.

=== Complaints involving Perceived Conflicts of Interest (2023) ===
In 2023, perceived conflicts of interest led to complaints lodged with the Illinois Judicial Inquiry Board, targeting Illinois Supreme Court justices Elizabeth Rochford and Mary O’Brien. The complaints stemmed from substantial campaign donations totaling $1 million each from Governor J.B. Pritzker to both justices. Following this, the justices opted not to recuse themselves from court cases linked to legislation endorsed by Pritzker. The reasons given for the decision were, 1. Exploration of whether Governor Pritzker's campaign donations to the Supreme Court justices induced a conflict of interest. 2. Determining if the complaints submitted to the Judicial Inquiry Board required further scrutiny or action.

Without commenting on the merits of either the court cases or the complaints, the Judicial Inquiry Board concluded the complaints.

The board's decision leaned on confidentiality clauses that restricted them from revealing details about their discussions or judgments. This led to the complaints' termination. The topic of perceived conflicts of interest, however, remains a focal point of public discourse and apprehension.

== See also ==
- List of polygamy court cases
- Satanism
