= United States v. Perkins =

- Supreme Court of the United States

Decided January 25, 1886
- Full case name: United States v. Perkins
- Citations: 116 U.S. 483 (more)

Holding
- Only the President has a constitutionally guaranteed appointment power. The power of Congress under the Appointments Clause to authorize the appointment of inferior officers by other appointing authorities includes the power to limit, restrict, and regulate the removal of such inferior officers.

Court membership
- Chief Justice Morrison Waite Associate Justices Samuel F. Miller · Stephen J. Field; Joseph P. Bradley · John M. Harlan; William B. Woods · Stanley Matthews; Horace Gray · Samuel Blatchford

Case opinion
- Majority: Matthews, joined by unanimous

Laws applied
- U.S. Const. art. II, § 2, cl. 2

United States v. Perkins, 116 U.S. 483 (1886), was a decision of the United States Supreme Court concerning the removal power under the Appointments Clause.

== Background ==
The plaintiff, a cadet-engineer in the United States Navy, sought to recover $100 in unpaid salary for the period from June 30 to September 1, 1883. The plaintiff had entered the United States Naval Academy as a cadet-engineer in 1877 and graduated on June 10, 1881. On June 26, 1883, the United States Secretary of the Navy notified him that, because no vacancy had arisen in the naval service during the preceding year requiring his appointment, he would be honorably discharged effective June 30, 1883 with one year's pay, pursuant to the Naval Appropriation Act of 1882.

The plaintiff refused and claimed that he remained in naval service. The government argued that, regardless of whether the Naval Appropriation Act of 1882 authorized the plaintiff's discharge, the United States Secretary of the Navy could remove him because a cadet-engineer was not an "officer" protected by Revised Statutes § 1229. It maintained that the power to remove him was implied in the power of appointment. The United States Court of Claims entered judgment in his favor, writing:

[The Constitution] provides that "Congress may by law vest the appointment of such inferior officers as they think proper in the President alone, in the courts of law, or in the heads of Departments." Congress has by express enactment vested the appointment of cadet-engineers in the Secretary of the Navy, and when thus appointed they become officers and not employés. United States v. Germaine, 99 U.S. 508; Moore v. United States, 95 U.S. 760: United States v. Hartwell, 6 Wall. 385.

== Decision ==
The Court declined to decide whether Congress could restrict the President's removal power over officers appointed by the President with the advice and consent of the Senate. It held, however, that when Congress vests the appointment of inferior officers in department heads under Article II, Section 2, it may also "limit, restrict, and regulate" the power of removal by statute. The Court reasoned that department heads possess no constitutional appointment authority independent of Congress and must exercise both the powers of appointment and removal in accordance with statutory limits.
