= Brown v. Buhman =

2016 US decision on Utah's criminal polygamy law

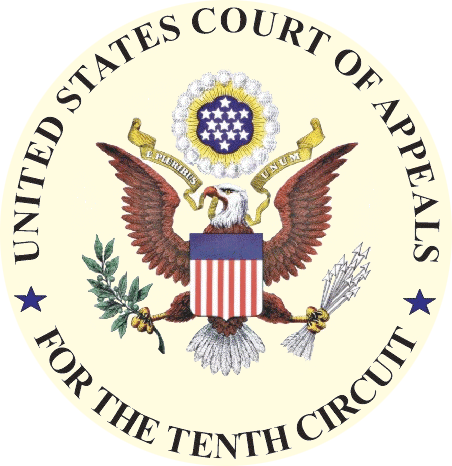
- Court: United States Court of Appeals for the Tenth Circuit
- Full case name: Kody Brown; Meri Brown; Janelle Brown; Christine Brown; Robyn Sullivan, Plaintiffs-Appellees, v. Jeffrey R. Burhman, Defendant-Appellant, in his official capacity as County Attorney for Utah County
- Decided: April 11, 2016

Case history
- Prior action: rev'g 947 F.Supp.2d 1170 (D. Utah 2013)

Court membership
- Judges sitting: Scott M. Matheson, Jr. (joined by Bobby Baldock and Nancy Moritz)

Keywords
- standing, polygamy

Brown v. Buhman, No. 14-4117 (10th Cir. 2016), is a legal case in the United States federal courts challenging the State of Utah's criminal polygamy law. The action was filed in 2011 by polygamist Kody Brown along with his wives Meri Brown, Janelle Brown, Christine Brown, and Robyn Sullivan. The Brown family belongs to the Apostolic United Brethren faith. They are best known for the reality television series featuring them, Sister Wives.

The Browns prevailed in the district court in a 2013 ruling, but a unanimous three-judge panel of the U.S. Court of Appeals for the Tenth Circuit ordered the case to be dismissed on standing grounds in 2016. The Tenth Circuit concluded that because local Utah prosecutors had a policy of not pursuing polygamy per se in the absence of additional associated crimes (e.g., welfare fraud or marriage of underage persons), the Browns had no credible fear of future prosecution and thus lacked standing.

== Background ==
When the Browns first became involved in the TV series, attorneys and legal experts claimed that, because polygamy is illegal in the United States, the Browns' involvement in the series might expose them to criminal prosecution. Video footage of a marriage ceremony between Kody Brown and Robyn Sullivan was potential evidence against them. Kody Brown has claimed the family is breaking no laws because only the first marriage is a legal marriage, while the others are simply commitments. However, experts claim that the family history as a unit for 16 years, including children from all four wives, could permit prosecutors to characterize the non-marriage unions as common-law marriages. Sullivan has said that the family was concerned about the legal repercussions of the series, but had discussed the matter thoroughly and decided that the positive effect their show could have on the public perception of polygamy was worth the risks. In anticipation of legal scrutiny, the producers of the show contacted the Utah Attorney General's office months before the series was broadcast. The office has not ruled out pursuing a case against the Brown family, but also stated they do not have the resources to go after polygamists unless they are suspected of serious crimes such as child abuse or child trafficking. Before Sister Wives premiered, nine years had passed since anyone in Utah had been prosecuted for practicing polygamy.

On September 27, 2010, the day after Sister Wives debuted, police in Lehi, Utah, announced they were investigating Kody Brown and his wives for possible charges of bigamy, a third-degree felony, which carries a possible penalty of 20 years in prison for Kody and up to five years in prison for each wife. Once the investigation concluded, the police turned their evidence over to the Utah County Attorney's office for review. Despite Kody Brown's being legally married to only one woman, Lehi police noted that the state code identifies bigamy through cohabitation, not just legal marriage contracts. In response to the investigation, the Browns released a statement: "We are disappointed in the announcement of an investigation, but when we decided to do this show, we knew there would be risks. But for the sake of our family, and most importantly, our kids, we felt it was a risk worth taking." The Brown family hired the George Washington University constitutional law scholar Jonathan Turley, a vocal critic of anti-polygamy laws, to prepare a legal defense in the event that charges are filed. As a result of the series and legal scrutiny that came with it, Meri lost her job in the mental health industry shortly after Sister Wives debuted, even though her employer knew about the polygamist marriage before the show aired. Additionally, Kody said the show negatively affected some of his advertising sales, with some clients opting to take their business elsewhere due to publicity from the show.

== District court ==
On July 13, 2011, the Browns filed a complaint in United States District Court for the District of Utah, challenging Utah's criminal polygamy law and released the following statement:

There are tens of thousands of plural families in Utah and other states. We are one of those families. We only wish to live our private lives according to our beliefs. While we understand that this may be a long struggle in court, it has already been a long struggle for my family and other plural families to end the stereotypes and unfair treatment given consensual polygamy. We are indebted to Professor Turley and his team for their work and dedication. Together we hope to secure equal treatment with other families in the United States.

On June 1, 2012, the criminal case against the Browns was dropped.

However, the civil suit filed by the Browns remained active after U.S. District Judge Clark Waddoups refused to dismiss it, saying that this "strategic attempt to use the mootness doctrine to evade review in this case draws into question the sincerity of [the Utah County Attorney's] contention that prosecution of plaintiffs for violating this statute is unlikely to recur." The hearing on the case occurred in January 2013.

On December 13, 2013, Judge Waddoups ruled that the portions of Utah's anti-polygamy laws which prohibit multiple cohabitation were unconstitutional but also allowed Utah to maintain its ban on multiple marriage licenses. Unlawful cohabitation, where prosecutors did not need to prove that a marriage ceremony had taken place (only that a couple had lived together), had been a major tool used to prosecute polygamy in Utah since the 1882 Edmunds Act.

== Tenth Circuit ==
The State of Utah appealed the ruling to the U.S. Court of Appeals for the Tenth Circuit. Oral argument was held on January 21, 2016. The State of Utah was represented by Parker Douglas. The plaintiffs were represented by prominent law professor Jonathan Turley, acting pro bono.

On April 11, 2016, a three-judge panel of the Tenth Circuit unanimously ordered the district court to dismiss the case on standing grounds. Judge Scott Matheson Jr. wrote for the court, and was joined by Judge Bobby Baldock and Judge Nancy Moritz. The court relied upon the Utah County Attorney's Office policy limiting polygamy prosecutions to those involving alleged child bigamy, fraud, abuse or violence, concluding "That policy eliminated any credible threat that the Browns will be prosecuted."
