= James Stirling (judge) =

British judge (1836–1916)

The Right Honourable Sir James Stirling FRS
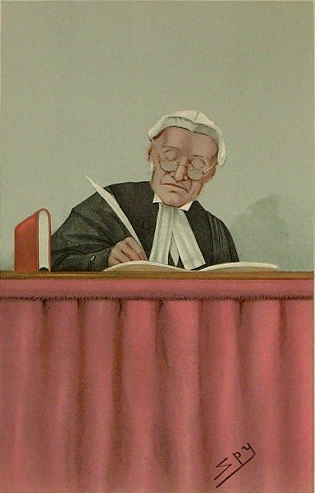
- "Equity", Vanity Fair caricature, 1897

Lord Justice of Appeal
- In office 27 October 1900 – 11 June 1906
- Preceded by: Sir Archibald Levin Smith
- Succeeded by: Sir George Farwell

Justice of the High Court
- In office 20 May 1886 – 27 October 1900
- Preceded by: Sir John Pearson
- Succeeded by: Sir Matthew Ingle Joyce

Personal details
- Born: 3 May 1836 Aberdeen, Scotland
- Died: 27 June 1916 (aged 80) Finchcocks, Goudhurst, Kent, England
- Spouse: Elizabeth "Aby" Renton (m. 1868)
- Children: 3
- Education: King's College, Aberdeen; Trinity College, Cambridge

Sir James Stirling, FRS (3 May 1836 – 27 June 1916) was a British barrister, judge, and amateur scientist. In his youth he demonstrated exceptional ability in mathematics, becoming Senior Wrangler at Cambridge in 1860, regarded at the time as "the highest intellectual achievement attainable in Britain". He was a High Court judge in the Chancery Division from 1886 to 1900, and a Lord Justice of Appeal from 1900, when he was made a Privy Counsellor, until his retirement in 1906. He continued to pursue his scientific and mathematical interests during his legal career, and after retiring from the bench became vice-president of the Royal Society in 1909–1910.

== Early life and education ==
James Stirling was born in Aberdeen, the eldest son of James Stirling (1797/8 – 1871), a United Presbyterian church minister, and Sarah Hendry Stirling (née Irvine, 1813–1875). He attended Aberdeen Grammar School from 1846 to 1851 and King's College at the University of Aberdeen from 1851, where he graduated MA in 1855, showing an exceptional ability in mathematics. He entered Trinity College at Cambridge University in 1856, was awarded the Sheepshanks exhibition in 1859, and became Senior Wrangler and first Smith's prizeman in 1860.

== Career ==
As he was not a member of the Church of England, he was ineligible for a fellowship at Cambridge. Turning to the legal profession, he joined Lincoln's Inn in January 1860, and was called to the bar in November 1862.

He reported cases in the rolls court, first for the New Reports, then for Law Reports until 1876. He was chosen in 1881 by the attorney-general, Sir Henry James as his "devil", or Treasury Devil, a prestigious appointment which leads almost automatically to appointment to the High Court bench. In 1886, he became a judge in the Chancery Division of the High Court, and was knighted in the same year; the following year he received an honorary LLD from his alma mater, the University of Aberdeen. He was promoted to the Court of Appeal on 27 October 1900, when Sir Archibald Smith became Master of the Rolls. Stirling retired from the bench on 11 June 1906.

In his early career he gained a high reputation as a draughtsman and conveyancer, but was diffident in recognising his own abilities. It was said that his opinion was "the best in Lincoln's Inn, if only one could get it". Later, as a judge, he demonstrated a degree of equanimity and clarity which made him popular with the bar. He was criticised for his slowness, but he was careful and painstaking, and his judgments were rarely reversed.

== Other interests ==
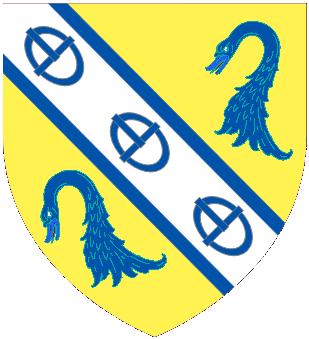
Arms as displayed at Lincoln's Inn

In 1878 he was recorded as being a member of the London Mathematical Society In 1898, a newspaper article noted that he still diligently studied mathematics and science. He became a Fellow of the Royal Society in 1902, and was its vice-president in 1909–1910.

He was also an amateur bryologist and member of the Moss Exchange Club, and owned a bryophyte herbarium, which included about 6000 varieties of mosses and liverworts. After his death, the herbarium was donated to the Tunbridge Wells Museum.

== Family life ==
Stirling married Elizabeth (Aby) Renton, daughter of John Thomson Renton, of Bradstone Brook, Shalford, Surrey, who was of Scottish descent, on 12 May 1868. Elizabeth was 9 years younger than Stirling, and they had three children: James Irvine (1869–1951), Agnes Renton (born 1871) and John Gordon (1874–1902). The family lived in Kensington; in 1871 they were in Hanover Terrace, and by 1881 had moved to Ladbroke Grove. The family were known to be living in Shalford in 1891, although they had leased Finchcocks, a Georgian manor house in Goudhurst, Kent from 1890, where Stirling spent most of his time after retirement. Stirling died at Finchcocks on 27 June 1916.
