= List of United States Supreme Court cases, volume 116 =

Supreme Court of the United States
- Interactive map of Supreme Court of the United States
- 38°53′26″N 77°00′16″W
- Established: March 4, 1789; 236 years ago
- Location: Washington, D.C.
- Coordinates: 38°53′26″N 77°00′16″W
- Composition method: Presidential nomination with Senate confirmation
- Authorised by: Constitution of the United States, Art. III, § 1
- Judge term length: life tenure, subject to impeachment and removal
- Number of positions: 9 (by statute)
- Website: supremecourt.gov

This is a list of cases reported in volume 116 of United States Reports, decided by the Supreme Court of the United States in 1885 and 1886.

== Justices of the Supreme Court at the time of volume 116 U.S. ==
The Supreme Court is established by Article III, Section 1 of the Constitution of the United States, which says: "The judicial Power of the United States, shall be vested in one supreme Court . . .". The size of the Court is not specified; the Constitution leaves it to Congress to set the number of justices. Under the Judiciary Act of 1789 Congress originally fixed the number of justices at six (one chief justice and five associate justices). Since 1789 Congress has varied the size of the Court from six to seven, nine, ten, and back to nine justices (always including one chief justice).

When the cases in volume 116 U.S. were decided the Court comprised the following nine members:

Portrait	Justice	Office	Home State	Succeeded	Date confirmed by the Senate (Vote)	Tenure on Supreme Court
	Morrison Waite	Chief Justice	Ohio	Salmon P. Chase	January 21, 1874 (63–0)	March 4, 1874 – March 23, 1888 (Died)
	Samuel Freeman Miller	Associate Justice	Iowa	Peter Vivian Daniel	July 16, 1862 (Acclamation)	July 21, 1862 – October 13, 1890 (Died)
	Stephen Johnson Field	Associate Justice	California	newly created seat	March 10, 1863 (Acclamation)	May 10, 1863 – December 1, 1897 (Retired)
	Joseph P. Bradley	Associate Justice	New Jersey	newly created seat	March 21, 1870 (46–9)	March 23, 1870 – January 22, 1892 (Died)
	John Marshall Harlan	Associate Justice	Kentucky	David Davis	November 29, 1877 (Acclamation)	December 10, 1877 – October 14, 1911 (Died)
	William Burnham Woods	Associate Justice	Georgia	William Strong	December 21, 1880 (39–8)	January 5, 1881 – May 14, 1887 (Died)
	Stanley Matthews	Associate Justice	Ohio	Noah Haynes Swayne	May 12, 1881 (24–23)	May 17, 1881 – March 22, 1889 (Died)
	Horace Gray	Associate Justice	Massachusetts	Nathan Clifford	December 20, 1881 (51–5)	January 9, 1882 – September 15, 1902 (Died)
	Samuel Blatchford	Associate Justice	New York	Ward Hunt	March 22, 1882 (Acclamation)	April 3, 1882 – July 7, 1893 (Died)

== Notable Cases in 116 U.S. ==
=== Presser v. Illinois ===
In Presser v. Illinois, 116 U.S. 252 (1886), the Supreme Court held "Unless restrained by their own constitutions, state legislatures may enact statutes to control and regulate all organizations, drilling, and parading of military bodies and associations except those which are authorized by the militia laws of the United States". The Court decided that the Second Amendment to the United States Constitution limited only the power of Congress and the national government to control firearms, not that of the states, and that the right to peaceably assemble stated in the First Amendment was not protected except to petition the government for a redress of grievances. Presser was overruled by the Supreme Court in 2010 via McDonald v. City of Chicago.

=== Boyd v. United States ===
Boyd v. United States, 116 U.S. 616 (1886), arose when 35 cases of plate glass were seized at the Port of New York for unpaid import duties. To prove the case, the government compelled E.A. Boyd & Sons to produce their invoice from the Union Plate Glass Company of Liverpool, England. Boyd complied, but claimed the order was a form of self-incrimination. On appeal, the Supreme Court held that "a search and seizure [was] equivalent [to] a compulsory production of a man's private papers" and the search was "an 'unreasonable search and seizure' within the meaning" of the Fourth Amendment to the United States Constitution. Although never expressly overruled, some aspects of the Court's opinion in Boyd have been limited or negated by subsequent decisions.

== Citation style ==
Under the Judiciary Act of 1789 the federal court structure at the time comprised District Courts, which had general trial jurisdiction; Circuit Courts, which had mixed trial and appellate (from the US District Courts) jurisdiction; and the United States Supreme Court, which had appellate jurisdiction over the federal District and Circuit courts—and for certain issues over state courts. The Supreme Court also had limited original jurisdiction (i.e., in which cases could be filed directly with the Supreme Court without first having been heard by a lower federal or state court). There were one or more federal District Courts and/or Circuit Courts in each state, territory, or other geographical region.

Bluebook citation style is used for case names, citations, and jurisdictions.

- "C.C.D." = United States Circuit Court for the District of . . .
  - e.g.,"C.C.D.N.J." = United States Circuit Court for the District of New Jersey
- "D." = United States District Court for the District of . . .
  - e.g.,"D. Mass." = United States District Court for the District of Massachusetts
- "E." = Eastern; "M." = Middle; "N." = Northern; "S." = Southern; "W." = Western
  - e.g.,"C.C.S.D.N.Y." = United States Circuit Court for the Southern District of New York
  - e.g.,"M.D. Ala." = United States District Court for the Middle District of Alabama
- "Ct. Cl." = United States Court of Claims
- The abbreviation of a state's name alone indicates the highest appellate court in that state's judiciary at the time.
  - e.g.,"Pa." = Supreme Court of Pennsylvania
  - e.g.,"Me." = Supreme Judicial Court of Maine

== List of cases in volume 116 U.S. ==
Case Name	Page and year	Opinion of the Court	Concurring opinion(s)	Dissenting opinion(s)	Lower Court	Disposition
Hanley v. Donoghue	1 (1885)	Gray	None	None	Md.	reversed
Bridgewater Iron Company v. Lissberger	8 (1885)	Gray	None	None	C.C.D. Mass.	affirmed
Marvel v. Merritt	11 (1885)	Matthews	None	None	C.C.S.D.N.Y.	affirmed
Saxonville Mills v. Russell	13 (1885)	Matthews	None	None	C.C.D. Mass.	affirmed
Miller v. Foree	22 (1885)	Bradley	None	None	C.C.D. Ky.	affirmed
Utah and Northern Railway Company v. Fisher	28 (1885)	Field	None	None	Sup. Ct. Terr. Idaho	affirmed
Holgate v. Eaton	33 (1885)	Miller	None	None	C.C.N.D. Ohio	reversed
United States v. Price	43 (1885)	Waite	None	None	N.D. Miss.	affirmed
Mackall v. Richards	45 (1885)	Waite	None	None	Sup. Ct. D.C.	dismissed
Lee v. Johnson	48 (1885)	Field	None	None	Mich.	reversed
Simmerman v. Nebraska	54 (1885)	Waite	None	None	Neb.	dismissed
Cannon v. United States	55 (1885)	Blatchford	None	Miller	Sup. Ct. Terr. Utah	affirmed
Roberts v. Reilly	80 (1885)	Matthews	None	None	C.C.S.D. Ga.	affirmed
Call v. Palmer	98 (1885)	Woods	None	None	C.C.D. Iowa	affirmed
United States v. Mooney	104 (1885)	Woods	None	None	C.C.D. Mass.	affirmed
Coyle v. Davis	108 (1885)	Blatchford	None	None	Sup. Ct. D.C.	affirmed
Liverpool and London Insurance Company v. Gunther	113 (1885)	Matthews	None	None	C.C.E.D.N.Y.	reversed
Fisk v. Jefferson Parish	131 (1885)	Miller	None	None	La.	reversed
Stewart v. Jefferson Parish	135 (1885)	Miller	None	None	La.	affirmed
San Mateo County v. Southern Pacific Railroad Company	138 (1885)	Waite	None	None	C.C.D. Cal.	dismissed
Hewitt v. Filbert	142 (1885)	Waite	None	None	Sup. Ct. D.C.	dismissed
McClure v. United States	145 (1885)	Waite	None	None	Ct. Cl.	order denied
Union Pacific Railroad Company v. United States	154 (1885)	Waite	None	None	Ct. Cl.	order denied
Burnett v. United States	158 (1885)	Harlan	None	None	Ct. Cl.	affirmed
Winchester and Partridge Manufacturing Company v. Creary	161 (1885)	Harlan	None	None	C.C.W.D. Tex.	reversed
Smith v. Whitney	167 (1886)	Gray	None	None	Sup. Ct. D.C.	affirmed
Field v. De Comeau	187 (1886)	Matthews	None	None	C.C.S.D.N.Y.	affirmed
Healy v. Joliet and Chicago Railroad Company	191 (1886)	Miller	None	None	Ill.	affirmed
Webb v. Barnwall	193 (1886)	Miller	None	None	C.C.M.D. Ala.	reversed
Doe v. Larmore	198 (1886)	Waite	None	None	Ala.	affirmed
Kings County Savings Institution v. Blair	200 (1886)	Woods	None	None	C.C.E.D.N.Y.	affirmed
Brown v. Colorado	207 (1886)	Harlan	None	None	C.C.D. Colo.	affirmed
Ford v. United States	213 (1886)	Harlan	None	None	Ct. Cl.	affirmed
City of Milwaukee v. Koeffler	219 (1886)	Miller	None	None	C.C.E.D. Wis.	reversed
Coney v. Winchell	227 (1886)	Waite	None	None	C.C.D. Conn.	affirmed
Southwestern Railroad Company v. Wright	231 (1886)	Waite	None	None	Ga.	affirmed
Brown v. Davis	237 (1886)	Blatchford	None	None	C.C.N.D.N.Y.	reversed
Presser v. Illinois	252 (1886)	Woods	None	None	Ill.	affirmed
United States v. Spiegel	270 (1886)	Matthews	None	None	C.C.S.D.N.Y.	certification
Renaud v. Abbott	277 (1886)	Matthews	None	None	N.H.	reversed
Port of Mobile v. Watson	289 (1886)	Woods	None	None	C.C.S.D. Ala.	affirmed
Stone v. Farmers' Loan and Trust Company	307 (1886)	Waite	None	Harlan; Field	C.C.S.D. Miss.	reversed
Stone v. Illinois Central Railroad Company	347 (1886)	Waite	None	Harlan; Field	C.C.S.D. Miss.	affirmed
Stone v. New Orleans and Northeastern Railroad Company	352 (1886)	Waite	None	Harlan	C.C.S.D. Miss.	reversed
Anderson v. Santa Anna Township	356 (1886)	Harlan	None	None	C.C.S.D. Ill.	reversed
Little v. Hackett	366 (1886)	Field	None	None	C.C.D.N.J.	affirmed
Mower v. Fletcher	380 (1886)	Waite	None	None	Cal.	affirmed
Stebbins v. Town of St. Anne	386 (1886)	Gray	None	None	C.C.N.D. Ill.	affirmed
Johnson v. Wilkins	392 (1886)	Waite	None	None	C.C.N.D. Fla.	dismissed
Wells v. Wilkins	393 (1886)	Waite	None	None	C.C.N.D. Fla.	dismissed
Hunt v. United States	394 (1886)	Woods	None	None	Ct. Cl.	affirmed
United States v. Wallace	398 (1886)	Matthews	None	None	Ct. Cl.	affirmed
Ex parte Brown	401 (1886)	Waite	None	None	Sup. Ct. Terr. Wash.	mandamus denied
Union Pacific Railroad Company v. United States	402 (1886)	Waite	None	None	Ct. Cl.	certiorari denied
Gibbons v. District of Columbia	404 (1886)	Gray	None	None	Sup. Ct. D.C.	affirmed
Fletcher v. Hamlet	408 (1886)	Waite	None	None	C.C.E.D. La.	affirmed
Eureka Lake and Yuba Canal Company v. Yuba County	410 (1886)	Waite	None	None	Cal.	affirmed
O'Reilly v. Campbell	418 (1886)	Field	None	None	Sup. Ct. Terr. Utah	affirmed
Carrick v. Lámar	423 (1886)	Field	None	None	Sup. Ct. D.C.	affirmed
Coffey v. United States	427 (1886)	Blatchford	None	None	C.C.D. Ky.	affirmed
Walling v. Michigan	446 (1886)	Bradley	None	None	Mich.	reversed
London Assurance Company v. Drennen, Starr & Everett	461 (1886)	Harlan	None	None	C.C.D. Minn.	affirmed
Pennsylvania Railroad Company v. St. Louis, Alton and Terre Haute Railroad Company	472 (1886)	Waite	None	None	C.C.D. Ind.	continued
United States v. Redgrave	474 (1886)	Matthews	None	None	Ct. Cl.	affirmed
United States v. Perkins	483 (1886)	Matthews	None	None	Ct. Cl.	affirmed
Laughlin v. District of Columbia	485 (1886)	Waite	None	None	Ct. Cl.	affirmed
Dunphy v. Ryan	491 (1886)	Woods	None	None	Sup. Ct. Terr. Mont.	affirmed
Oberteuffer, Abegg and Daeniker v. Robertson, Collector of the Port of New York	499 (1886)	Blatchford	None	None	C.C.S.D.N.Y.	reversed
Coe v. Town of Errol	517 (1886)	Bradley	None	None	N.H.	affirmed
Iron Silver Mining Company v. Cheesman	529 (1886)	Miller	None	None	C.C.D. Colo.	affirmed
Kentucky Central Railroad Company v. Bourbon County	538 (1886)	Waite	None	None	Ky.	advancement denied
Chicago Tyre and Spring Works Company v. Spalding	541 (1886)	Blatchford	None	None	C.C.N.D. Ill.	affirmed
Otis v. Oregon Steamship Company	548 (1886)	Waite	None	None	N.Y.	dismissed
Barry v. Edmunds	550 (1886)	Matthews	None	None	C.C.E.D. Va.	reversed
Chaffin v. Taylor	567 (1886)	Matthews	None	None	Va.	reversed
Royall v. Virginia	572 (1886)	Matthews	None	None	Va.	reversed
Sands v. Edmunds	585 (1886)	Matthews	None	None	Va.	reversed
Hartog v. Memory	588 (1886)	Waite	None	None	C.C.N.D. Ill.	reversed
Shepard v. Carrigan	593 (1886)	Woods	None	None	C.C.D. Mass.	reversed
Ming v. Woolfolk	599 (1886)	Woods	None	None	Sup. Ct. Terr. Mont.	affirmed
Liebke v. Thomas	605 (1886)	Miller	None	None	Mo. Ct. App.	reversed
Jones and Weil v. Simpson	609 (1886)	Harlan	None	None	C.C.D. Kan.	reversed
Boyd v. United States	616 (1886)	Bradley	Miller	None	C.C.S.D.N.Y.	reversed
Northern Pacific Railway Company v. Herbert	642 (1886)	Field	Harlan	Blatchford	Sup. Ct. Terr. Dakota	affirmed
Preston v. Manard	661 (1886)	Gray	None	None	C.C.N.D. Ill.	affirmed
Vicksburg, Shreveport and Pacific Railway Company v. Dennis	665 (1886)	Gray	None	Field	C.C.N.D. Ill.	affirmed
Higgins v. McCrea	671 (1886)	Woods	None	None	C.C.N.D. Ohio	multiple
Reynolds v. Iron Silver Mining Company	687 (1886)	Miller	None	Waite	C.C.D. Colo.	reversed
City of Waterville v. Van Slyke	699 (1886)	Miller	None	None	C.C.D. Kan.	dismissed
