= Cannon v. United States =

- Supreme Court of the United States

Argued November 20, 23, 1885 Decided December 14, 1885
- Full case name: Cannon v. United States
- Citations: 116 U.S. 55 (more) 6 S. Ct. 278; 29 L. Ed. 561

Holding
- Compacts for sexual non-intercourse, easily made and easily broken, when the prior marriage relations continue to exist, with the occupation of the same house and table and the keeping up of the same family unity, is not a lawful substitute for the monogamous family which alone the statute tolerates.

Court membership
- Chief Justice Morrison Waite Associate Justices Samuel F. Miller · Stephen J. Field; Joseph P. Bradley · John M. Harlan; William B. Woods · Stanley Matthews; Horace Gray · Samuel Blatchford

Case opinions
- Majority: Blatchford, joined by Waite, Bradley, Harlan, Woods, Mathews and Gray
- Dissent: Miller, joined by Fields

Cannon v. United States, 116 U.S. 55 (1885), was a United States Supreme Court case in which the Court held compacts for sexual non-intercourse, easily made and easily broken, when the prior marriage relations continue to exist, with the occupation of the same house and table and the keeping up of the same family unity, is not a lawful substitute for the monogamous family which alone the statute tolerates.
