= Jonathan Turley =

American attorney and commentator (born 1961)

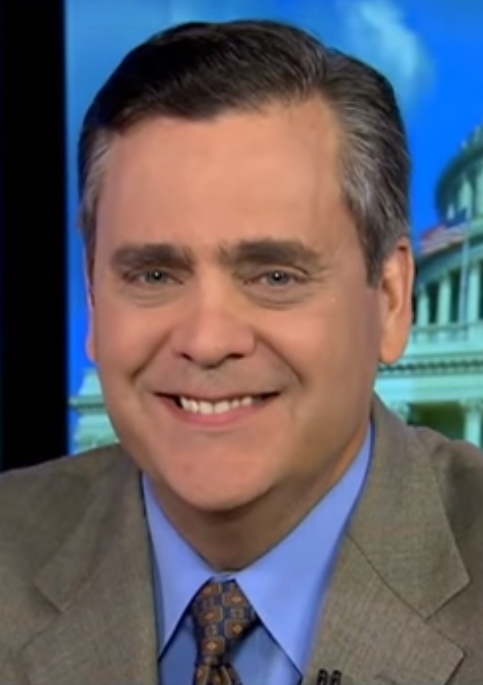
- Turley in 2017
- Born: May 6, 1961 (age 65); Chicago, Illinois, U.S.
- Spouse: Leslie Turley (m. 1997)

Academic background
- Education: University of Chicago (BA); Northwestern University (JD)

Academic work
- Discipline: Law
- Sub-discipline: Constitutional law, tort law, criminal law, legal theory
- Institutions: George Washington University
- Website: jonathanturley.org

Jonathan Turley (born May 6, 1961) is an American attorney, legal scholar, writer, commentator, and legal analyst in broadcast and print journalism. A professor at George Washington University Law School, he has testified in United States congressional proceedings about constitutional and statutory issues. He has also testified in multiple impeachment hearings and removal trials in Congress, including the impeachment of President Bill Clinton and both the first and second impeachments of President Donald Trump. Turley is a First Amendment advocate and writes frequently on free speech restrictions in the private and public sectors. He is the author of the book The Indispensable Right: Free Speech in an Age of Rage, as well as Rage and the Republic: The Unfinished Story of the American Revolution.

As an attorney, Turley has worked on notable cases in civil rights defense including the defenses of Sami Al-Arian, NSA whistleblower David Faulk, protesters at the World Bank/IMF demonstrations in 2000, and the Brown family in their challenge to Utah polygamy laws. Turley has also served as counsel on prominent federal cases including the defense of Area 51 workers, and as lead counsel in the 2014 challenge to the Affordable Care Act.

== Early life and education ==
Turley grew up in a politically active Chicago family as the youngest of five children. His father, John (Jack) Turley was an international architect, partner at Skidmore, Owings, and Merrill, and the former associate of famed modernist architect Ludwig Mies van der Rohe. Turley has written about his father's influence on his constitutional theories. His mother, Angela Piazza Turley, was a social worker and activist who was the former president of Jane Addams Hull-House in Chicago. He is of Irish and Italian ancestry. He is the author of the book The Indispensable Right: Free Speech in an Age of Rage.

Turley served as a House leadership page in 1977 and 1978 under the sponsorship of Illinois Democrat Sidney Yates.

Turley graduated from the Latin School of Chicago. He received a bachelor's degree from the University of Chicago in 1983, and a Juris Doctor degree from Northwestern University School of Law in 1987. He served as Executive Articles Editor of Northwestern University Law Review.

During the Reagan Administration, Turley worked as an intern with the general counsel's office of the National Security Agency (NSA).

== Career ==
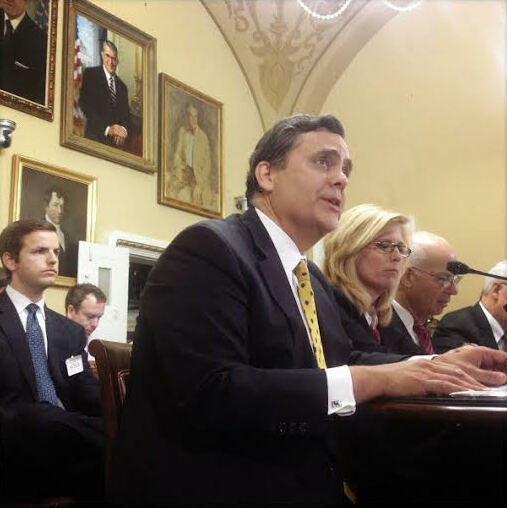
Testifying to Congress, 2007

Turley holds the Shapiro Chair for Public Interest Law at The George Washington University Law School, where he teaches torts, criminal procedure, and constitutional law. He is the youngest person to receive an academic chair in the school's history. He runs the Project for Older Prisoners (POP), the Environmental Law Clinic, and the Environmental Legislation Project.

Prior to joining George Washington University, he was on the faculty of Tulane University Law School.

His articles on legal and policy issues have appeared in national publications; he has had articles published in The New York Times, The Washington Post, USA Today, the Los Angeles Times, and the Wall Street Journal. He frequently appears in the national media as a commentator on a multitude of subjects ranging from the 2000 U.S. presidential election controversy to the Terri Schiavo case in 2005. He often is a guest on Sunday talk shows, with more than two-dozen appearances on Meet the Press, ABC This Week, Face the Nation, and Fox News Sunday. He served as a contributor on Countdown with Keith Olbermann from 2003 until 2011 on MSNBC, and later on Current TV in 2011 and early 2012.

Since the 1990s, he has been a legal analyst for NBC News, CBS News, the BBC and Fox News, covering stories that ranged from the Clinton impeachment to presidential elections. He is on the board of contributors of USA Today and is a columnist with The Hill. He is currently a legal analyst with Fox News. Due to his decades of work as a columnist and network analyst, media reporter Paul Farhi, writing in the Washington Post, has described Turley as "the Dean" of legal analysts.

On October 11, 2016, Libertarian Party candidate for president, Gary Johnson, announced that if he was elected president, Turley would be one of his two top choices for the Supreme Court seat that remained open following the death of Justice Antonin Scalia. Turley has been repeatedly named as a top pick for the Court by libertarian presidential candidates, including in 2020.

== Views ==
=== Executive Power/War on Terror ===
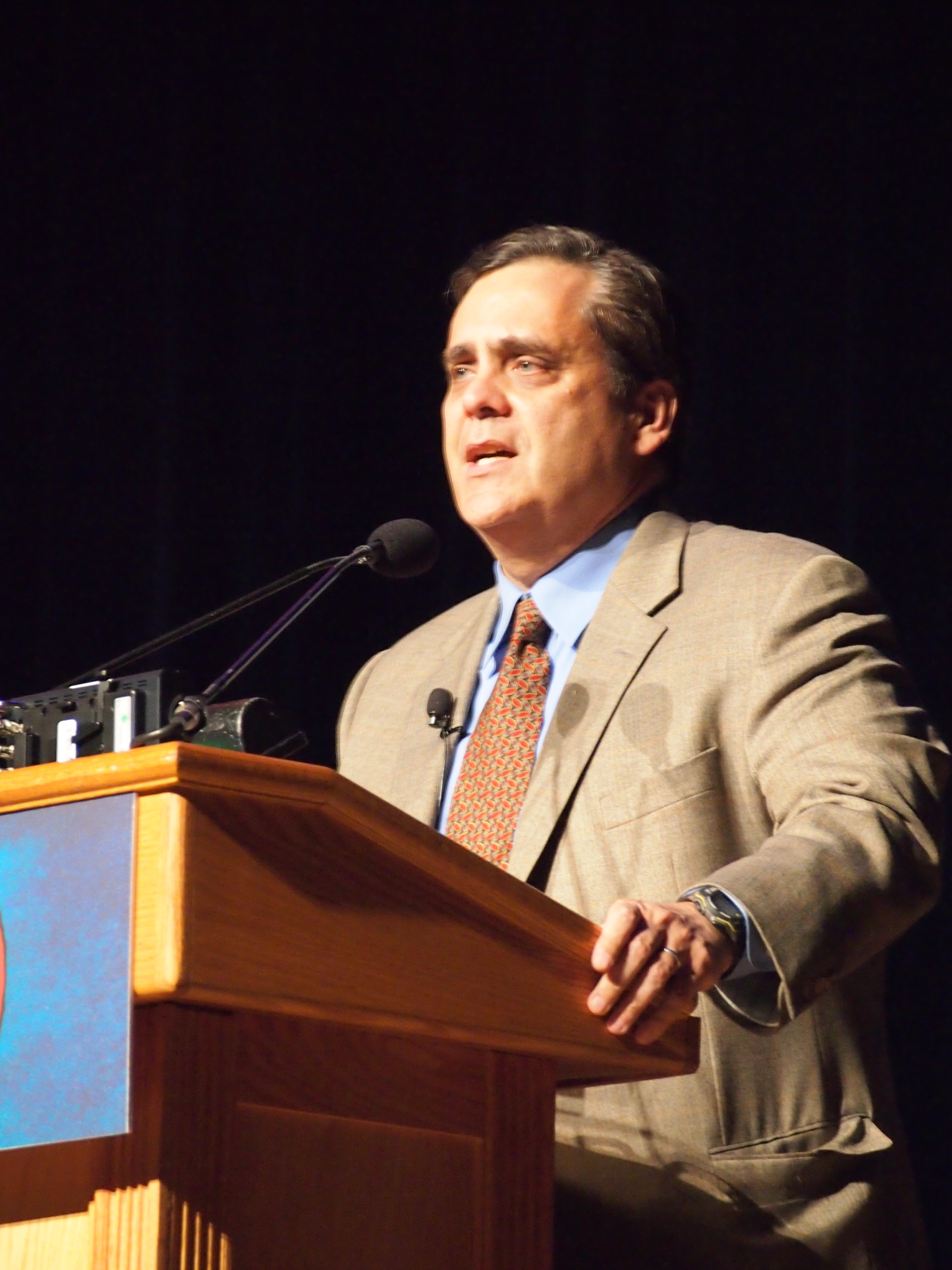
Turley in 2016

In appearances on Countdown with Keith Olbermann and The Rachel Maddow Show, he called for criminal prosecution of Bush administration officials for war crimes, including torture.

In October 2006, in an interview by Keith Olbermann of MSNBC, he expressed strong disapproval of the Military Commissions Act of 2006. Commenting on the Military Commissions Act of 2006, which he contends does away with habeas corpus, Turley says, "It's something that no one thought—certainly I didn't think—was possible in the United States. And I am not too sure how we got to this point. But people clearly don't realize what a fundamental change it is about who we are as a country. What happened today changed us."

When the U.S. Senate was about to vote on Michael Mukasey for U.S. attorney general, Turley said, "The attorney general nominee's evasive remarks on 'water-boarding' should disqualify him from the job." On the treatment of terrorism suspect José Padilla, Turley says, "The treatment of Padilla ranks as one of the most serious abuses after 9/11... This is a case that would have shocked the Framers. This is precisely what many of the drafters of the Constitution had in mind when they tried to create a system of checks and balances." Turley considers the case of great import on the grounds that "Padilla's treatment by the military could happen to others."

When Congressional Democrats asked the Justice Department to investigate the CIA's destruction of terrorist interrogation tapes Turley said, "these are very serious allegations, that raise as many as six identifiable crimes ranging from contempt of Congress, to contempt of Justice, to perjury, to false statements."

In a 2017 column for The Hill, Turley was critical of military intervention in the Middle East and questioned its constitutionality.

=== Other Views ===
In USA Today in October 2004, he argued for the legalization of polygamy, provoking responses from writers such as Stanley Kurtz.

Turley has said, "It is hard to read the Second Amendment and not honestly conclude that the Framers intended gun ownership to be an individual right."

Turley disagrees with the theory that dealing with bullies is just a part of growing up, claiming that they are "no more a natural part of learning than is parental abuse a natural part of growing up" and believes that "litigation could succeed in forcing schools to take bullying more seriously".

He has written extensively in opposition to the death penalty, noting, "Human error remains a principal cause of botched executions... eventually society will be forced to deal directly with a fundamental moral question: Has death itself become the intolerable element of the death penalty?"

He is a critic of special treatment for the church in law, asking why there are laws that "expressly exempt faith-based actions that result in harm."

In the wake of the 2020 U.S. presidential election, Turley argued that, despite his doubts that fraud existed, Americans should welcome the involvement of the courts to vet and validate the election results.

=== Obama administration views ===
In another commentary, Turley defended Judge Henry E. Hudson's ruling declaring the individual mandate in health insurance unconstitutional for violating the Commerce Clause of the Constitution: "It's very thoughtful—not a screed. I don't see any evidence this is motivated by Judge Hudson's personal beliefs... Anybody who's dismissing this opinion as a political screed has obviously not read the opinion."

Turley described U.S. Attorney General Eric Holder in an op-ed as President Barack Obama's sin-eater, writing:

For Obama, there has been no better sin eater than Holder. When the president promised CIA employees early in his first term that they would not be investigated for torture, it was the attorney general who shielded officials from prosecution. When the Obama administration decided it would expand secret and warrantless surveillance, it was Holder who justified it. When the president wanted the authority to kill any American he deemed a threat without charge or trial, it was Holder who went public to announce the "kill list" policy. Last week, the Justice Department confirmed that it was Holder who personally approved the equally abusive search of Fox News correspondent James Rosen's e-mail and phone records in another story involving leaked classified information. In the 2010 application for a secret warrant, the Obama administration named Rosen as "an aider and abettor and/or co-conspirator" to the leaking of classified materials. The Justice Department even investigated Rosen's parents' telephone number, and Holder was there to justify every attack on the news media.

In a December 2013 congressional hearing, responding to a question from Rep. Bob Goodlatte (R-VA) about presidential power in the Obama administration, Turley said:

The danger is quite severe. The problem with what the president is doing is that he's not simply posing a danger to the constitutional system. He's becoming the very danger the Constitution was designed to avoid. That is the concentration of power in every single branch. This Newtonian orbit that the three branches exist in is a delicate one but it is designed to prevent this type of concentration. There is [sic] two trends going on which should be of equal concern to all members of Congress. One is that we have had the radical expansion of presidential powers under both President Bush and President Obama. We have what many once called an imperial presidency model of largely unchecked authority. And with that trend we also have the continued rise of this fourth branch. We have agencies that are quite large that issue regulations. The Supreme Court said recently that agencies could actually define their own or interpret their own jurisdiction.

On November 21, 2014, Turley agreed to represent House Speaker John Boehner and the Republican Party in a suit filed against the Obama administration alleging unconstitutional implementation of the Affordable Care Act, specifically the individual mandate. In 2016, the federal court ruled that the Obama Administration violated the separation of powers in ordering billions to be paid to insurance companies without an appropriation of Congress.

=== Testimony before Congress ===
The conceptual thread running through many of the issues taken on by Turley is that they involve claims of executive privilege. For example, he said that the president's claim of executive authority based on Article Two "would put our system on a slippery slope." He has argued against national security exceptions to fundamental constitutional rights.

He is a frequent witness before the House and Senate on constitutional and statutory issues, as well as tort reform legislation.

Turley has testified regularly during national controversies. He testified at the confirmation hearings of Associate Justice Neil Gorsuch, Attorney General Loretta Lynch, and Attorney General William Barr. He also testified during the Clinton impeachment hearings. Turley, in his capacity as a constitutional scholar, testified in favor of the Clinton impeachment. He was quoted extensively by congressman James Rogan during the Clinton impeachment hearings.

Turley also testified in Congress against President George W. Bush's warrantless domestic surveillance program and was lead counsel in a case challenging it. In regard to warrantless wiretaps he noted that, "Judge Anna Diggs Taylor chastised the government for a flagrant abuse of the Constitution and, in a direct message to the president, observed that there are no hereditary kings in America."

==== Views on Trump impeachments ====
On December 4, 2019, Turley testified before the House Judiciary Committee regarding the constitutional grounds for presidential impeachment in the impeachment inquiry against then-President Donald Trump, arguing against a Trump impeachment.

In his testimony, Turley objected to the effort to craft articles of impeachment around four criminal allegations: bribery, extortion, obstruction of justice, and campaign finance violations. He argued that the evidence did not meet the standard definitions of those crimes, contrary to the testimony of three witnesses that such legal definitions have always been used as a measure for impeachment deliberations. Turley characterized the charges against Trump as a lowering of impeachment standards to "fit a paucity of evidence and an abundance of anger." The Committee ultimately rejected all four of those articles and adopted the two that Turley argued could be legitimate if proven: abuse of power and obstruction of Congress. Where the Committee departed from the testimony was the rejection of Turley's call for more time to develop a more complete record rather than fulfill a promise to impeach by Christmas—an issue that was rekindled by the delay in the submission of the articles to the Senate as new evidence emerged in 2020.

It was alleged by critics that Turley adopted a different position on the need for a crime for impeachment in the Trump impeachment after denying such a requirement in the impeachment of President Bill Clinton. Turley pointed out that he denied that you needed a prerequisite crime in both impeachments and Democratic members in the Clinton impeachment actually relied on his position in arguing the case for impeachment in both the Trump impeachment hearing and trial. Turley noted that in both hearings he stressed that a president could be impeached for non-criminal acts, including abuse of power, and House Judiciary Chairman Jerry Nadler ended the Trump impeachment hearings by quoting him to that effect. He has noted that the only disagreement was the sufficiency of the record and his calling on House to issue subpoenas for key witnesses such as former national security adviser John Bolton. The push for additional time was due in part to Turley's concern that the House was going to impeach a president for going to the courts rather than yielding to congressional demands for witnesses and documents. Given the short period of investigation, Turley objected that such a move would effectively make seeking judicial review as high crime and misdemeanor. He noted that both Presidents Richard Nixon and Bill Clinton were able to go all the way to the Supreme Court on their challenges before impeachment. While Turley told the Committee that such judicial opinions were not required to impeach on obstruction, the abbreviated period of investigation undermined the foundation of that article.

Turley was cited by both the White House and House managers in their arguments before the United States Senate in the Trump impeachment trial. During the trial, Turley opposed the White House argument that impeachment requires a criminal allegation. Turley wrote in The Washington Post that "If some of the president’s critics are adopting a far too broad understanding of impeachable offenses, the White House is adopting a far too narrow one."

After the second impeachment of Donald Trump, he said there could not be a trial after Trump left office. Turley's views were also cited on the House floor in Trump's second impeachment in January 2021 in the aftermath of the January 6 United States Capitol attack, particularly his opposition to what he called a "snap impeachment." Turley opposed the decision to forgo any hearing to consider the implications of such a rapid impeachment, consider changes to the language, and allow for a formal response from Trump. While Turley said that Trump's conduct could amount to an impeachable offense, he expressed reservations over the specific language of the article on free speech grounds. He condemned Trump's speech before the riot on Twitter when it was still being given and opposed from the outset the challenge to the electoral votes that decided the election in favor of Joe Biden brought by pro-Trump Republicans in the U.S. House of Representatives. He argued for a bipartisan, bicameral vote of censure to condemn Trump's words and actions leading up to the riot. Turley declined to represent Trump, but did speak to Republican senators before both the first Trump trial and the second Trump trial.

=== Biden administration views ===
In August 2024, Turley asserted that the Biden-Harris administration made attacks on free speech ranging from a massive censorship system to funding blacklisting operations to silence voices it disagreed with, adding that the policies were supported by Kamala Harris. He described Tim Walz as one of the "most enthusiastic supporters of censorship and blacklisting systems", and asserted that Walz made a false claim about free speech and the claim was rejected by the Supreme Court. As Harris tapped Walz as her running mate, Turley argued that free speech was the key issue in 2024 United States presidential election, comparing it to the 1800 United States presidential election.

=== Trump administration views ===
Avatar of Jonathan Turley

Jonathan Turley
(@JonathanTurley)
tweeted:

Border Czar Tom Homan doubled down last night that Rep.Alexandria Ocasio-Cortez (D-NY) might be prosecuted for hosting a forum on ‘Know Your Rights’ for accused illegal aliens. Such a prosecution would be an assault on free speech rights. While AOC has never been a defender of free speech, principle demands something more from the rest of us who value the First Amendment. Just as VP Vance offered a powerful defense of free speech in Europe, this baseless threat undermines the high ground achieved in Munich.

February 17, 2025

In a February 2025 post to X, Turley strongly objected to a suggestion made by Trump Administration border affairs advisor Tom Homan that Rep. Alexandria Ocasio-Cortez might be criminally charged for hosting a webinar for illegal migrants titled "Know Your Rights" if it were determined the webinar had impeded the efforts of federal law enforcement officers. Turley contended Homan's comments were a "baseless threat" and that such a move would be "an assault on free speech rights".

== Awards ==
Turley was ranked as 38th in the top 100 most cited "public intellectuals" (and second most cited law professor) in a 2001 study by Judge Richard Posner of intellectuals referenced in the media and public debates. In 2024, the Washingtonian recognized Turley as one of the most influential persons in shaping policy.

In 2005, Turley was given the Columnist of the Year award for Single-Issue Advocacy for his columns on civil liberties by the Aspen Institute and The Week magazine.

In 2008 he was awarded an honorary doctorate of law from John Marshall Law School in recognition of his career as an advocate of civil liberties and constitutional rights.

He was ranked among the nation's top 500 lawyers in 2008. Turley was found to be the second most cited law professor in the country as well as being ranked as one of the top ten military lawyers.

In 2008 his blog was ranked as the top law professor blog and legal theory blog by the American Bar Association Journal survey of the top 100 blogs. His work with older prisoners has been honored in various states, including his selection as the 2011 recipient of the Dr. Mary Ann Quaranta Elder Justice Award at Fordham University. He has also been ranked in the top five most popular law professors on Twitter. He has received other awards including the James Madison award and was declared one of four university fellows at the Utah Valley University in 2019.

== Prominent cases ==
Turley has served as counsel in notable cases; representing whistleblowers, military personnel, and a wide range of other clients in national security, environmental, and constitutional law cases. His cases as lead counsel have secured decisions striking down both a federal and a state law, among them:

- Larry Hanauer, a House Intelligence Committee staff member falsely accused of leaking classified information to The New York Times
- David Faulk, a whistleblower who revealed abuses at NSA's Fort Gordon surveillance programs
- Dr. Eric Foretich, in overturning the Elizabeth Morgan Act in 2003
- Former Judge Thomas Porteous's impeachment trial defense Turley characterized Porteous's chronic bribe-taking as merely being a "moocher", convicted on four articles of impeachment, removed as judge by a Senate vote of 94-2
- Defendants in terrorism cases, including Ali al-Tamimi (the alleged head of the Virginia Jihad/Paintball conspiracy)- On September 1, 2020, a federal court found that his challenges to his conviction had merit and ordered his release to Turley at Supermax in Colorado to drive back to Virginia to avoid risks of COVID-19.
- Area 51 workers at a secret air base in Nevada.
- Lead counsel in the litigation over the mass arrests at the World Bank/IMF protests in Washington.
- Turley represented the Rocky Flats grand jury in Colorado
- Turley testified on December 4, 2019, regarding the impeachment inquiry of President Donald Trump, regarding constitutional issues not supporting the impeachment of Trump.
- Turley filed a challenge to the Libyan War on behalf of ten members of Congress. The lawsuit was before the United States District Court for the District of Columbia.

== Personal life ==
Turley married his wife, Leslie, in 1997. They have four children.

=== Swatting ===
On December 29, 2023, Turley was targeted as part of the 2023 swatting of American politicians.
