= Carrick v. Snyder =

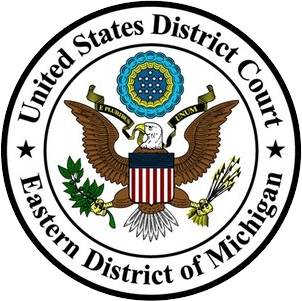
- Court: United States District Court for the Eastern District of Michigan
- Full case name: Neil Patrick Carrick, Plaintiffs v. Richard Snyder, in his official capacity as Governor of the State of Michigan, Bill Schuette, in his official capacity as Michigan Attorney General
- Docket nos.: 5:15-cv-10108
- Defendants: Richard Snyder, in his official capacity as Governor of the State of Michigan, Bill Schuette, in his official capacity as Michigan Attorney General

Court membership
- Judge sitting: Judith Ellen Levy

Keywords
- marriage license, cohabitation, polygamy, equal protection, freedom of religion

Carrick v. Snyder was a 2015 federal court case requesting that the plaintiff Rev. Neil Patrick Carrick be allowed to perform marriage ceremonies that are currently prohibited, including same sex and polygamous wedding ceremonies.

The case lists the Michigan Governor Governor Rick Snyder and Attorney General Bill Schuette as defendants.

The Detroit minister Pastor Neil Patrick Carrick sued to invalidate Mich. Stat. § 551.14, which provides,

If a person authorized to solemnize marriages knowingly joins any persons in marriage contrary to the provisions of this chapter, he or she shall forfeit for each offense a sum not exceeding $500.00.

The case was filed on January 12, 2015, in the Eastern District of Michigan, Southern Division. It was assigned to District Judge Judith Ellen Levy under the case number 5:2015cv10108.

The case was dismissed with prejudice on February 10, 2016, for lack of standing.
