= Stanley Kurtz =

American conservative commentator

- Born: Pittsburgh, Pennsylvania, U.S.

Academic background
- Education: Haverford College; Harvard University

Stanley Kurtz is an American conservative commentator, author and a senior fellow at the Ethics and Public Policy Center. He has taught at Harvard University and the University of Chicago. He is also a contributing editor to National Review.

== Career ==
Kurtz was born to a Jewish family and graduated from Haverford College and earned a Ph.D. in social anthropology from Harvard University. He did his field work in India and taught at Harvard and the University of Chicago.

Kurtz is a senior fellow at the Ethics and Public Policy Center and a former adjunct fellow with Hudson Institute, with a special interest in America's "culture wars." He has published extensively on family life, child rearing, religion, and psychology in various parts of the world.

He is the education writer for the National Review and is an active member of the National Association of Scholars (NAS).

== Works ==
His writings on the family, feminism, homosexuality, affirmative action, and campus "political correctness" have appeared in National Review, Policy Review, The Weekly Standard, The Wall Street Journal, and Commentary.

=== Partisanship Out of Civics Act (POCA) ===
His February 15, 2021 model act, published by the NAS, entitled Partisanship Out of Civics Act (POCA), has been cited by state legislatures when they draft bills to limit the teaching of critical race theory in schools, such as in South Carolina, and Texas. Kurtz supported the NAS Coalition to prevent the politicization of civic education.
