= Seeking Sister Wife =

American television series

- Genre: Reality television
- Country of origin: United States
- Original language: English
- No. of seasons: 6
- No. of episodes: 69

Production
- Production company: Bright Spot Content

Original release
- Network: TLC
- Release: January 14, 2018 – present

Seeking Sister Wife is an American reality television show on TLC that follows polygamous families, predominantly centered around the topic of looking for another wife to add to the family, or an already added new wife adjusting to the family.

== Cast ==
Family	Members	Prospects	Cultural background	Seasons					
Family	Members	Prospects	Cultural background	1	2	3	4	5	6
Briney	Drew, April, Auralee, Angela		Mormon	Main					
Alldredge	Jeff, Vanessa, (Note: Sister of Mitch Thompson, Sister Wives daughter Aspyn Brown's husband) Sharis	Melina (s1), Jennifer (s2)	Mormon	Main					
Snowden	Dimitri, Ashley	Joselyn, Jakira (s1), Vanessa (s2), Christeline, Tayler (s3)	Secular	Main					
Winder	Colton, Tami, Sophie	Jay (s2), Kimberley (s3)	Mormon		Main				
McGee	Bernie, Paige	Brandy (s2)	Biblical		Main				
Clark	Jarod, Vanessa, Kaleh	Emily (s3), Christa (s3)	Secular			Main			
Jones	Sidian, (Note: Grandson of Rolling Thunder by way of his daughter Morning Star.) Tosha	Alexandra (s3), Arielle (s4)	Secular			Main			
Merrifield	Garrick, Dannielle	Roberta (s3, s4), Lea (s4), Nathalia, Mariam (s5), Lorrana (s6)	Christian			Main			
Davis	Nick, April, Jennifer	Danielle (s4), Jasmine (s5), Teresa (s6)	Secular				Main		
Foley	Steve, Brenda	April (s4)	Christian				Main		
Epps	Marcus, Taryn, India	Bina, Janae (s4)	Secular				Main		
Ryan	Justin, Becky	Yary (s5)	Alamo Christian Foundation					Main	
Sherwood	Shane, Ashley	Grace, Sarah (s5)	Secular					Main	
Salahuddin	Naeem, Nailah		Muslim					Main	
Williamson	Reise, Billie Jean								Main
Peralta	Yessel, Dani								Main
Johnson	Matt, Anjelica	Shanay (s6)							Main

=== Weddings ===
Couple	Married	Still together	Notes
Dimitri, Ashley, & Vanessa	Yes	No	Married in episode "The Snowden's Say 'We Do!'"
Dimitri, Ashley, & Christeline	Yes	No	Married in episode "One Nation"
Nick, April, Jennifer, & Danielle	Yes	No	Married in episode "Mr. and Mrs. and Mrs. ... and Mrs."
Garrick, Dannielle, & Lorrana	Yes	Yes	

== Episodes ==
Season	Episodes	Originally released	
Season	Episodes	First released	Last released
1	7	January 14, 2018	March 4, 2018
2	12	January 20, 2019	April 14, 2019
3	12	March 22, 2021	June 7, 2021
4	14	June 6, 2022	September 5, 2022
5	13	March 4, 2024	May 27, 2024
6	11	September 22, 2025	December 1, 2025

=== Season 1 (2018) ===
No. overall	No. in season	Title	Original release date	US viewers (millions)
1	1	"Let the Seeking Begin!"	January 14, 2018	N/A
2	2	"Risky Business"	January 21, 2018	N/A
3	3	"Three's Company or Three's Crowd?"	January 28, 2018	N/A
4	4	"13 is Enough!"	February 11, 2018	N/A
5	5	"Too Much Wrong, and Not Enough Right..."	February 18, 2018	N/A
6	6	"Blast from the Past"	February 25, 2018	N/A
7	7	"Plural Lives Equals Happy Wives?"	March 4, 2018	N/A

=== Season 2 (2019) ===
No. overall	No. in season	Title	Original release date	US viewers (millions)
8	1	"It's Time to Seek Again"	January 20, 2019	N/A
9	2	"Failure to Launch"	January 27, 2019	N/A
10	3	"Coming Out Plural"	February 10, 2019	N/A
11	4	"Unforeseen Circumstances"	February 17, 2019	N/A
12	5	"Thou Shall Not Sext"	February 24, 2019	N/A
13	6	"The Waiting Game..."	March 3, 2019	N/A
14	7	"Guess Who's Coming To Dinner?"	March 10, 2019	N/A
15	8	"Don't Go Breaking My Heart"	March 17, 2019	N/A
16	9	"It's Getting Steamy Up In Here!"	March 24, 2019	N/A
17	10	"One Wedding And A Funeral?"	March 21, 2019	N/A
18	11	"The Snowden's Say 'We Do!'"	April 7, 2019	N/A
19	12	"Tell All"	April 14, 2019	N/A

=== Season 3 (2021) ===
No. overall	No. in season	Title	Original release date	US viewers (millions)
20	1	"Polygamist and Proud!"	March 22, 2021	N/A
21	2	"Irreconcilable Differences"	March 29, 2021	N/A
22	3	"I Gotta Have Faith"	April 5, 2021	N/A
23	4	"Emotions and Commotions"	April 12, 2021	N/A
24	5	"Sharing Is Caring"	April 19, 2021	N/A
25	6	"Got to Be Real"	April 26, 2021	N/A
26	7	"Miss You Much"	May 3, 2021	N/A
27	8	"Full House"	May 10, 2021	N/A
28	9	"You Dropped a Bomb on Me"	May 17, 2021	N/A
29	10	"Deeper and Deeper"	May 24, 2021	N/A
30	11	"Can't Fight This Feeling"	May 31, 2021	N/A
31	12	"One Nation"	June 7, 2021	N/A

=== Season 4 (2022) ===
No. overall	No. in season	Title	Original release date	US viewers (millions)
32	1	"Who Doesn't Like Thirds?"	June 6, 2022	N/A
33	2	"Little Do They Know"	June 13, 2022	N/A
34	3	"Can't Clip These Wings"	June 20, 2022	N/A
35	4	"Three's a Crowd"	June 27, 2022	N/A
36	5	"Do You Have Condoms?"	July 4, 2022	N/A
37	6	"A Distant Dream"	July 11, 2022	N/A
38	7	"Roses Are Red, But Not on the Bed!"	July 18, 2022	N/A
39	8	"I'm in Love with Your Big Brain"	July 25, 2022	N/A
40	9	"You Want All the Juicy Details?"	August 1, 2022	N/A
41	10	"So Many Things Could Go Wrong"	August 8, 2022	N/A
42	11	"Brazil or Bust"	August 15, 2022	N/A
43	12	"An Emotional Rollercoaster"	August 22, 2022	N/A
44	13	"No Kiss Friends"	August 29, 2022	N/A
45	14	"Mr. and Mrs. and Mrs. ... and Mrs."	September 5, 2022	N/A

=== Season 5 (2024) ===
No. overall	No. in season	Title	Original release date	US viewers (millions)
46	1	"Seeking Can Be a Shock"	March 4, 2024	N/A
47	2	"Seeking Danielle Davis"	March 11, 2024	N/A
48	3	"Seeking Something Real"	March 18, 2024	N/A
49	4	"Seeking the Truth"	March 25, 2024	N/A
50	5	"Seeking Can Be Complicated..."	April 1, 2024	N/A
51	6	"Seeking Commitment"	April 8, 2024	N/A
52	7	"Seeking Answers"	April 15, 2024	N/A
53	8	"Seeking the Unexpected"	April 22, 2024	N/A
54	9	"Seeking a Silver Lining"	April 29, 2024	N/A
55	10	"Seeking a Deeper Understanding"	May 6, 2024	N/A
56	11	"Seeking a Connection"	May 13, 2024	N/A
57	12	"Seeking Common Ground"	May 20, 2024	N/A
58	13	"Seeking Our Forever"	May 27, 2024	N/A

=== Season 6 (2025) ===
No. overall	No. in season	Title	Original release date	US viewers (millions)
59	1	"You're No Longer in Brazil, Dorothy!"	September 22, 2025	N/A
60	2	"I'm Trying to Create Voltron Here"	September 29, 2025	N/A
61	3	"Freaky Stuff Is Going On Here"	October 6, 2025	N/A
62	4	"Mac 'N Cheese Noises"	October 13, 2025	N/A
63	5	"This Is My Wife, Our Wife and Our GF"	October 20, 2025	N/A
64	6	"I'm Kinda Vanilla in Bed"	October 27, 2025	N/A
65	7	"Have to Choose Between My Two Wives"	November 3, 2025	N/A
66	8	"It's Just Papers, Right?"	November 10, 2025	N/A
67	9	"I Knew This Conversation Was Coming"	November 17, 2025	N/A
68	10	"A Married Side Chick?"	November 24, 2025	N/A
69	11	"Defenders of the Universe"	December 1, 2025	N/A

== Abuse allegations ==
Christeline Petersen filed for a restraining order against Dimitri Snowden in March 2021 and alleged domestic abuse. Prior Snowden sister wife from before the show began, Ariadne Joseph, came forward and reported abuse as well. She alleged she told TLC this during season 1, and they did nothing.

Garrick Merrifield was arrested for domestic violence on November 24, 2025.

== See also ==
- Seeking Brother Husband, TLC's 2023 spin-off of Seeking Sister Wife
- Sister Wives, a reality TV show on TLC about a polygamist family
- My Five Wives, a reality TV show on TLC about a polygamist family
- Polyamory: Married & Dating, a reality TV show on Showtime about a polyamorous families
- Polygamy in North America
