= Seeking Brother Husband =

American television series

- Genre: Reality television
- Country of origin: United States
- Original language: English
- No. of seasons: 1
- No. of episodes: 6

Original release
- Network: TLC
- Release: March 26 – April 30, 2023

Seeking Brother Husband is an American reality television show on TLC. It is a spin-off of the show Seeking Sister Wife.

== Background ==
TLC tried to frame the show as polyandrous (one wife, multiple husbands), to parallel their other polygynous (one husband, multiple wives) show, Seeking Sister Wife. However polyandry is very rare, and many of the couples on the show have previously been public about being polyamorous (both parties have multiple partners, typically casual ones).

Elisa Alpizar & Mike Onorato have hosted a podcast called Poly+Amor=Us since Jan 31, 2021. Kenya and Carl Stevens run a website called the Progressive Love Academy (PSALMS) and Carl has a second wife, Corina Naré Seku.

== Cast ==
Couple	Location
Elisa & Mike	Los Angeles, CA
Kenya, Carl, & Tiger	Houston, TX
Kim, Dustin, & Vinson	Asheville, NC
Chara, Patrick, & Nobel	Atlanta, GA

== Episodes ==
No.	Title	Original release date	US viewers (millions)
1	"It's Raining Men"	March 26, 2023	1.29
2	"Three's a Crowd, but Four..."	April 2, 2023	1.14
3	"Two Men and a Baby"	April 9, 2023	1.08
4	"Welcome to the Brotherhood"	April 16, 2023	1.05
5	"Parents Just Don't Understand"	April 23, 2023	1.07
6	"My Two Dads"	April 30, 2023	0.97

== See also ==
- Seeking Sister Wife, TLC's 2018 show that this is a spin-off of
- Polyamory: Married & Dating, a 2012 reality TV show on Showtime about a polyamorous families
