= Man to Man =

Man to Man may refer to:

== Film ==
- Man to Man (1922 film), an American Western
- Man to Man (1930 film), an American drama
- Man to Man (1992 film), a British television film by Manfred Karge in the anthology series ScreenPlay
- Man to Man (2005 film), a historical drama

== Television ==
- Man to Man with Dean Learner, a 2006 British comedy television show
- James Brown: Man to Man, a 1968 television special featuring James Brown
- "Man to Man", MGM Television sports talk program with Eddie Carroll and Jamie Farr
- "Man to Man", an episode of Frontier Doctor
- Man to Man (TV series), a 2017 South Korean television series

== Music ==
- Man 2 Man, a band from New York City
- Man To Man, box set by Bob Marley and The Wailers JAD/Universal
- Man to Man (album), 1976 album and title song by Hot Chocolate
- "Man to Man" (Gary Allan song), a 2003 song by Gary Allan, written by Jamie O'Hara
- "Man To Man", song recorded by Hank Williams, Jr. from his 1990 album Lone Wolf
- "Man To Man", song by Bob Marley and The Wailers, reissued on Hall of Fame: A Tribute to Bob Marley's 50th Anniversary
- "Man To Man", first single of The Cherry Boys, 1981
- "Man To Man", song by Scotch, 1987
- "Man To Man", song by Dorian Electra, 2019

== Other uses ==
- Man-to-man defense, a type of defensive used in team sports
- Man-to-man wargame, a wargame
- Steve Jackson's Man to Man, a role-playing game supplement

== See also ==
- One on One (disambiguation)
