= Ziona =

Indian sect leader (1945–2021)

- Born: Zionnghaka; 21 July 1945; Baktawng village, Assam Province, British India
- Died: 13 June 2021 (aged 75); Aizawl, Mizoram, India
- Known for: Fathering the largest living family
- Spouses: 39
- Children: 94

Ziona (born Zionnghaka; 21 July 1945 – 13 June 2021) was the leader of Lalpa Kohhran Thar (meaning "The Lord's New Church"), informally referred to as Chana Pâwl or Chhuanthar Kohhran ("The Church of New Generation"), a polygamy-practising Christian sect in Mizoram, India. He was often referred to as a world record holder for being the head of the "world's largest existing family" or the "world's biggest family". In 2011, as officials of the Guinness World Records made verification, he refused the world record title as he shunned publicity. His family was nonetheless listed as the "Biggest Family" in the world in 2011 by the World Record Academy, and The Wall Street Journal in 2011, and then by the London World Records in 2019.

The religious sect he led was formed by his uncle Khuangtuaha in 1942 as a millennialist denomination, which survives in Serchhip district in Mizoram state of India, sharing borders with Bangladesh and Myanmar. After migration from Hmawngkawn village, the sect settled in Baktawng village Mizoram, India. In 1997, Ziona succeeded his father Chana, who in turn had succeeded Khuangtuaha in 1966. He had 39 wives, 94 children, 14 daughters-in-law, 33 grandchildren and one great grandchild; 181 family members in total and counting. His family and their four-story residence are one of the major tourist attractions in Mizoram. He was featured in Ripley's Believe It or Not! top 11 strangest stories for the year 2011, and in 2013's Ripley Believe It or Not book 9.

== Life and family ==
Ziona was born Zionnghaka on 21 July 1945 at Hmawngkawn village in Serchhip district, which is 100 kilometres (62 mi) to the south of Aizawl, the capital of Mizoram. He is popularly known among the Mizo natives as Pu Ziona, and commonly misnamed in the non-native media as Ziona Chana. His father was Challianchana, leader of the Christian sect, Chana Pâwl. He married his first wife Zaṭhiangi, who is older than him by three years, at the age of 17. Zaṭhiangi is the head wife and directs the household chores of the family with strict discipline. After Chana's death on 27 February 1997, Ziona was elected as the successor. The sect called him by the title "Hotupa" (literally meaning leader or master). By the time he took up the leadership, he already had more wives than his father. He married ten of his wives in the span of one year.

Ziona built a four-storied mansion, which appears like a boarding house, to accommodate his large family. The house is called the "Chhuan Thar Run" (meaning the House of the New Generation) and is located in the mountainous village of Baktawng. There is also a "Khualbuk" (a guesthouse) to accommodate visitors coming to the village. Ziona had a double bedroom in the ground floor of this mansion and his wives took turns to sleep with him according to a roster. His younger wives stayed close to his room on the same floor and there were always seven to eight wives attending to his needs during the day. All older wives live in the dormitories on the first floor of the mansion, while his younger wives live on the ground floor. His wives claim that there is no rivalry among them. Of his 39 wives, 22 are below the age of 40 and they got a week to spend with him. He has 26 sons-in-law and his daughters live separately with their families. He said that he has named all his children and grandchildren and he remembered the names of every member of his family. He married his last wife in 2004. It is not known exactly how many wives he had had in his lifetime. By 2005, three were dead and some abandoned him.

Ziona's family is self-reliant, growing crops for their food requirements. He has also established a school for his children, and his younger brother looks after its functioning. Though teaching in the school is based on a curriculum prescribed by the government, he has added some subjects specific to his Chana sect. He did not seek any assistance from the government.

Ziona's wives do the cooking, and his daughters attend to cleaning of the house and take care of washing laundry. Men of the family attend to livestock rearing, agriculture (jhum cultivation), small cottage industries of wood furniture (carpentry), aluminum utensil making, and so forth.

Ziona's 68th birthday was celebrated on 21 July 2013 with 150 guests.

=== Later life and death ===
At age 75, Ziona was diagnosed with hypertension and diabetes mellitus. On 7 June 2021, he became seriously ill and became unconscious on 11 June. Doctors at Baktawng found that he had anaemia. In critical condition, he was brought to Trinity Hospital at Aizawl in the afternoon of 13 June (Sunday). He was already unconscious when they reached the hospital at around 2:30 p.m., and was revived briefly using CPR. The doctors pronounced him dead at 3:00 p.m., 10 minutes after he was admitted. He is survived by 38 wives, 89 children and 33 grandchildren.

Announcing his death, Chief Minister of Mizoram, Zoramthanga, posted on Twitter, and said:

With heavy heart, Mizoram bid farewell to Mr. Zion-a (76), believed to head the world's largest family, with 38 wives and 89 children. Mizoram and his village at Baktawng Tlangnuam has become a major tourist attraction in the state because of the family. Rest in Peace Sir!

As his body was brought home in the night of 13 June, his pulse regained. Oximeter showed stable pulse and his body remained warm the following day. The family declared the pulse stopped at 9:00 p.m. on Monday. After two days of preparation, the official funeral and burial were done on 17 June 2021.

== Religious faith ==
Ziona was chief of the group known as Chana Pâwl (Pâwl means sect, group, or organization), a Christian sect that practices polygamy. His uncle (father's elder brother, or grandfather, according to some sources), Khuangtuaha founded the sect on 12 June 1942 at Hmawngkawn village, and was named Lalpa Kohhran Thar ("The Lord's New Church"); but was more popular as Khuangtuaha Pâwl. At the time the mainstream Christian church in Mizoram objected to the use of pagan practices in Christian worship, including the use of a traditional drum called khuang. Khuangtuaha Pawl believed that the drum was harmless and adopted it as one of the key instruments for worship. The sect also advocated millennialism by accepting the literal event of Bible's Revelation Chapter 20 to "Kum Sang Rorel" or the rule of 1,000 years by Jesus Christ on Earth. Khuangtuaha also decreed that a man may marry as many wives as he can support.

The Presbyterian Church excommunicated them for propagating a theology considered "wrong and dangerous". A popular account that the Chief of Hmawngkawn banished them in 1942, with the support of British officers, is false. Khuangtuaha died in 1955 at Hmawngkawn and is interred at Hmawngkawn cemetery. After Khuangtuaha's death, his brother Chana inherited the sect leadership. The sect then became popularly known as Chana Pâwl, but they also used a formal name "Lalpa Kohhran" (meaning "The Lord's Church") for their denomination. It was only in 1967, following political turmoil in Mizoram due to the Mizo National Front uprising, that the government relocate them along with hundreds of small villages. The sect were allowed settled in Baktawng. After Ziona led the sect, they assumed a new name for their community as Chhuanthar (meaning the "New Generation"), and the sect became sometime referred to as Chhuanthar Kohhran ("The Church of New Generation"). The sect celebrate their founding day as "Bawkte Kut" (literally meaning "Festival of the Hut") on 12 June every year. As of 2021, the sect has over 2,000 followers in 433 families, who all reside in the Baktawng Tlangnuam village.

== World record ==
Although it is popularly reported that Ziona is the world record holder as heading the biggest family in the Guinness World Records, even in government sources, it is not included in the Guinness. (Guinness has no record for biggest/largest human family.) By 2005, with 15 wives and more than 100 children, he could have been eligible for the Guinness record. In 2007, he was proposed for entry into the Guinness, but as the officials visited him, he refused to have his photograph taken. In 2011, he explained to a CNN reporter, the reason he declined the record was that "he doesn't want the publicity."

Ziona's family is recorded by the World Record Academy as setting the world record for the "Biggest Family". At the time of the record entry in 2011, Ziona had 39 wives, 94 children, 14-daughters-in-laws and 33 grandchildren. The same year, The Wall Street Journal listed the family as "The Biggest Family in the World". Ziona was listed as "head of the world’s biggest family" in the London World Records in 2019.

In 2011, Ripley's Believe It or Not!, while recording Ziona's family as the largest living family in the world, observed: "It's a safe bet that Ziona Chana would not be impressed watching 19 Kids and Counting or Sister Wives. The 75-year-old Indian man had 39 wives, 94 children and 33 grandchildren and 1 great grandchild." Ziona and his family was included in 2013's Ripley Believe It or Not book 9.
