= Andrea Canning =

Canadian TV journalist (born 1972)

- Born: Andrea Mead Canning; December 10, 1972 (age 53); Collingwood, Ontario, Canada
- Education: University of Western Ontario; Ryerson Polytechnic University (Radio and Television Arts)
- Occupations: Broadcast journalist Screenwriter
- Years active: 1996–present
- Notable credit: New York-based correspondent for Dateline NBC
- Spouse: Tony Bancroft (m. 2008)
- Children: 6

Andrea Mead Canning (born December 10, 1972) is a Canadian-born journalist and writer. She was named a Dateline NBC correspondent in 2012 and contributes to other NBC News platforms such as Today, NBC Nightly News and MSNBC. She also is a fill-in anchor and news anchor on Today and Weekend Today.

== Early life ==
Canning was born and raised in Collingwood, Ontario. Athletic, she participated in competitive skiing. She graduated from the University of Western Ontario with a degree in psychology in 1994. She also studied radio and television arts at Ryerson Polytechnic University.

== Career ==
Her early assignments included work for WCPO-TV in Cincinnati as a reporter and co-anchor of the evening newscast. From 1996 to 1997, Canning was an assignment editor for the tabloid TV show Extra. While living in Los Angeles, she was also an intern for Baywatch and shared a house with future media personality and TV host Ryan Seacrest. She returned to Canada, working from 1997 to 1999 as a reporter and anchor for CKVR-TV, in Barrie, Ontario. From 1999 to 2001, Canning worked for WPTV-TV in West Palm Beach, Florida and She was also the morning anchor for WXVT-CBS in Greenville, Mississippi.

Canning was a correspondent for ABC News from 2004 until April 2012, where she covered the White House, Congress, the Supreme Court and the Iraq War for ABC's affiliate NewsOne. While at ABC News, she covered a wide array of stories ranging from crime stories and notable trials to the devastation of Hurricane Katrina and the Casey Anthony case. Her public profile was elevated considerably after she interviewed Charlie Sheen for 20/20 on February 28, 2011. The interview was subsequently used as the basis for a viral video that received more than 10 million views during its first nine days on YouTube.

During her time at ABC News, Canning contributed to Good Morning America, Nightline, World News with Diane Sawyer and 20/20, while regularly anchoring the early morning broadcasts World News Now and America This Morning. Canning also served as an alternate news reader for Good Morning America.

Canning joined NBC News in October 2012 as a correspondent for Dateline while contributing to other NBC News platforms.

Canning has been a screenwriter since 2016 and has written various TV and movie scripts. IMDb lists over 20 productions, such as USS Christmas, Double Mommy and Killer Prom.

Canning served as the 'Tell All' reunion host for seasons 11 and 12 of Sister Wives.

Canning has appeared in the role of a news anchor in the Ruby Herring Mystery movie series, beginning in 2019.

=== Drama writer ===
In addition to working as a journalist, Canning is a writer for Hallmark Channel and Lifetime television movies.

== Personal life ==
In June 2008, Canning married Captain (later Lt. Col) Tony Bancroft, a United States Marine Corps Reserve fighter pilot who later served as an F/A-18 instructor pilot; the ceremony was in her family's Ontario hometown of Collingwood. They have five daughters and one son: Anna, Charlotte "Charlie," Christina "Kiki," Georgia, Elle and George Anthony Bancroft III.

She is a member of Alpha Gamma Delta and was presented with their Talent of Leadership award in 2015 and their Distinguished Citizens Award in 2018.
