= Lalpa Kohhran Thar =

Millennialist new religious movement in Mizoram, India

Total population
- c. 2,000 to 3,000 in 350 to 433 families (2021 est.)

Founder
- Khuangtuaha (Khuangtuahthanga), 1942

Regions with significant populations
- Mizoram, India (principally Serchhip district)
- Serchhip district, Mizoram: c. 300 families at Chhuanthar Tlangnuam, Baktawng
- Other parts of Mizoram: Scattered adherents in various professions

Religions
- Self-identified as Christian (heterodox, millennialist); classified by scholars as a syncretic new religious movement that retains pre-Christian Mizo cultural elements

Scriptures
- Bible (with particular emphasis on Revelation chapter 20)

Languages
- Mizo

Related ethnic groups
- Mizo people; Mizoram Presbyterian Church Synod (parent body from which the group split in 1942)
- Also known as Khuangtuaha Pawl, Chana Pawl, Ziona Pawl and Chhuanthar Kohhran.

Lalpa Kohhran Thar (lit. 'The Lord's New Church') is a millennialist new religious movement centred in Mizoram, India. It originated in 1942 as a dissenting breakaway from the Presbyterian Church in Mizoram and developed into a syncretic community combining millennialist readings of the Bible with elements of pre-Christian Mizo culture, including the ritual use of the khuang drum and Mizo rice wine, as well as the practice of polygamy. Members identify themselves as Christian, while all major Christian denominations in Mizoram have, since the movement's founding, have considered its theology and practice to be heretical and thus, fall outside the bounds of mainstream Christianity.

Founded by World War I veteran Khuangtuaha (full name Khuangtuahthanga; 1891 to 1955), the movement flourishes in Serchhip district, with its centre at Chhuanthar Tlangnuam on the western fringe of Baktawng village. Adherents were originally based at Hmawngkawn village and resettled in the late 1960s under a government village-grouping policy. Owing in part to its acceptance of polygamy, the sect is sometimes described in popular media as the "Mormons of Mizoram", a comparison that scholars consider loose and analogical rather than historical. As of 2021, the community is estimated at over 2,000 adherents in 433 families spread across various parts of Mizoram.

The movement's most internationally recognised leader, Ziona (1945 to 2021), gained global attention for heading what was widely reported as the world's largest single family, with 39 wives, 94 children, 33 grandchildren and one great-grandchild at the time of his death. Selected in 2007 for entry as the biggest family in the Guinness World Records, Ziona declined the listing to avoid publicity. His family was later listed as the "Biggest Family" in the world in 2011 by the World Record Academy and by The Wall Street Journal the same year, and then by the London World Records in 2019. Ziona was also featured among Ripley's Believe It or Not!'s top 11 strangest stories of 2011 and in 2013's Ripley Believe It or Not Book 9.

== Names ==
The community is known under several overlapping names. The official name, Lalpa Kohhran Thar ("The Lord's New Church"), was adopted in 1971 at the suggestion of Darhmingliana, the Administrative Officer of Baktawng, after the community had functioned for nearly three decades without a single agreed designation. A shorter variant, Lalpa Kohhran ("The Lord's Church"), was also used internally during the Chana era.

In common Mizo usage, members and outsiders refer to the group by the name of the leader of the period: Khuangtuaha Pawl (Khuangtuaha's sect, c. 1936 to 1955), Chana Pawl (Chana's sect, 1955 to 1997) and informally Ziona Pawl (Ziona's sect, 1997 to 2021), with pawl meaning "group", "sect", or "organisation". An early derogatory label was Khurbing, a reference to the irregular sexual practice prescribed in the movement's early years. Under Ziona's leadership the community renamed itself Chhuanthar ("New Generation"), and the church accordingly became known as Chhuanthar Kohhran ("Church of the New Generation").

== Origin and history ==
=== Khuangtuaha Pawl ===
The founder, Khuangtuaha (full name Khuangtuahthanga), was born in 1891 at Sialsuk village in the Lushai Hills, the second child of eight siblings, four brothers and four sisters. He fought in the Abor War of 1912 and afterwards served in World War I as a volunteer in the British Army, receiving two war medals for service in France.

A reported spiritual experience in 1935 prompted Khuangtuaha to devote his life to evangelism. He established a small following at Hmawngkawn village, where he is said to have had an apparition of three strangers who told him that he was destined to be one of "the three stars" and instructed him in new religious practices. Khuangtuaha was the first to adopt a kind of partner-exchange practice called khurbing, in which men and women within the group formed extramarital pairings outside their formal marriages.

A former Mizo traditional drummer, Khuangtuaha also reintroduced the khuang (Mizo traditional drum) as an instrument of worship. The British missionaries regarded the drum as deeply tied to pre-Christian Mizo ritual and had denounced its use in worship. Khuangtuaha also revived the consumption of zu (Mizo rice wine), which the Presbyterian Church had likewise proscribed. His followers began to be known collectively as Khuangtuaha Pawl. Original membership was approximately 30 persons.

In response to these practices, and in particular to the birth of an illegitimate child fathered by Khuangtuaha, the Presbyterian Church officially condemned the group as upholding "wrong and dangerous" theology and excommunicated them in 1942. Supported by his younger brother Chana (full name Challianchana), Khuangtuaha formally established a new sect on 12 June 1942. His followers settled with him in a localised area on the outskirts of Hmawngkawn village. The sect continues to celebrate that date each year as Bawkte Kut (literally "Festival of the Hut", in reference to the initial settlement). Citing the moral and social unrest that the new movement was held to cause, the British authorities imprisoned Khuangtuaha for three months in 1942 and again for nine months in 1943.

A widely repeated account that Khuangtuaha and his followers were evicted from Hmawngkawn by the village chief, with the support of British officers, is contradicted by indigenous historical sources, including James Dokhuma's Zoram Tualto Kohhran Chanchin and V. L. Zaikima's Lalpa kohhran thar, both of which record that adherents joined the founder voluntarily from various parts of the Lushai Hills.

To the dismay of followers who revered him as a prophet, Khuangtuaha died on 30 March 1955. He was interred at the Hmawngkawn cemetery, where the inscription on his tombstone reads:

Kan pa hmangaih ram hruaitu Khuangtuahthanga Mizoram hmingthang berte zinga mi chu March 30, 1955-ah Lalpa hnenah a chawl ta. Kum 64. Chhakchhuak. [Our beloved father and leader Khuangtuahthanga, one of the most renowned people of Mizoram, rested with the Lord on 30 March 1955. Aged 64. Chhakchhuak (clan name).]

Two memorial stones at Hmawngkawn also bear inscriptions in his honour, including one with the heading:

Kan pa nunhlun zirna sikul hawngtu hmasa ber Khuangtuahthanga chu March 30, 1955-ah Lalpa hnenah a chawl ta. [Our father, the first to open the school of everlasting life, Khuangtuahthanga, rested with the Lord on 30 March 1955.]

The community observes that date as a holy day in place of Good Friday.

=== Chana Pawl ===
Khuangtuaha was succeeded by his younger brother, Chana. Some news reports describing Khuangtuaha as the father of Chana are inaccurate; Chana was his brother. Chana, born in 1910, had received secondary education and is described by Dokhuma as more modernised than his elder brother. Against the wishes of their father Thlohva, who held to traditional Mizo religion and discouraged him from following Khuangtuaha, Chana converted to Christianity and ultimately joined his elder brother's sect.

Chana introduced polygamy into the community. He married seven wives in his lifetime, and Khuangtuaha followed his example, marrying three wives before his death. Unlike Khuangtuaha, Chana did not reject materialism and accepted allopathic medicine, including pharmaceutical drugs. He was credited by his followers with foretelling major political events, including the abolition of Mizo tribal chieftainship by the government, the withdrawal of British missionaries, the Independence of India and the rise and fall of Hitler. In 1956 he constructed a formal worship complex called Inpui ("mansion" or "temple"), incorporating his quarters, a church and a community hall. Under Chana's leadership the community became popularly known as Chana Pawl.

==== Migration and resettlement ====
In 1966, Mizoram entered a period of social and political turbulence following the Mizo National Front uprising, which sought independence from India. From 1967 onwards the Government of India implemented a counterinsurgency village-grouping policy, the Protected and Progressive Villages (PPVs), under which small settlements were compelled to merge into larger ones accessible to roads and security forces.

For Hmawngkawn, the nearest grouping centre was Baktawng, some 50 km away. Chana's followers, then numbering about 20 families, were permitted to relocate together at the western fringe of Baktawng, building a settlement from scratch in dense forest. They named the new habitation Tlangnuam ("Serene Hill" or "Pleasant Ridge"), still the community's principal settlement.

The early years at Tlangnuam were marked by severe hardship, and some followers, discouraged by privation, considered abandoning the movement. The community came close to what Vanlalpeka has described as a demographic bottleneck. Chana, however, organised the group along strict lines of division of labour, encouraging members to specialise in farming, carpentry and tinsmithing. When Mizoram was granted Union Territory status in 1972 and the wider political situation stabilised, the community had begun to take on the character of a self-sustaining "industrial colony", and a significant local voting bloc in village council elections.

==== Adoption of the formal name ====
By the late 1960s the community was known variously as Khuangtuaha Pawl, Khurbing and Chana Pawl, with no single agreed designation. As the group consolidated, Darhmingliana, the Administrative Officer of Baktawng, suggested the formal name Lalpa Kohhran Thar ("The Lord's New Church"). The community approved the name in 1971.

=== Ziona and Chhuanthar ===
Chana died on 27 February 1997, and his eldest son Ziona was duly chosen as successor. Born Zionnghaka (later styled Zionthanga and finally Ziona) on 21 July 1945, he was widely known among Mizo speakers as Pu Ziona ("Mr. Ziona"), and frequently misnamed in non-native media as "Ziona Chana". Internally, the community addressed him by the honorific Hotupa ("master" or "leader").

Ziona became the most prolific polygamist of the movement. He married his first wife Zaṭhiangi, three years his senior, at the age of 17, and his last in 2004. By the time he assumed leadership in 1997, he already had more wives than his father. He is reported to have married ten of his wives within a single year. The exact total number of wives he had during his lifetime is not known; by 2005 three were deceased and others had departed. At his death in 2021, he was reported to have 38 surviving wives, 89 children and 33 grandchildren.

==== Social and structural reforms ====
Ziona instituted a markedly different communal organisation from that of his predecessors. He separated the place of worship from the place of residence, constructing a new church named Hnam Thlan Run Pui ("Mansion of the Chosen People"), and a massive four-storey residence called Chhuanthar Run ("Abode of the New Generation") with more than 100 rooms, housing some 200 members of his immediate family. Ziona occupied a double bedroom on the ground floor; his wives took turns to share it according to a roster. The younger wives lived close to his quarters on the ground floor, while older wives occupied dormitories on the first floor. Reports describe seven to eight wives attending to his daily needs at any given time. The complex became one of Mizoram's most visited tourist attractions, and Ziona built a separate guesthouse, Khualbuk, to receive visitors.

Ziona's personality and the appeal of the community's organisation drew new adherents from outside; by his later years the movement counted approximately 3,000 members in some 350 families, of whom about 300 families resided at Tlangnuam itself. In one of the most significant doctrinal reforms in the community's history, Ziona prohibited the early khurbing practice of extramarital pairings. Marriages within the community continued to be arranged through elected priests rather than the leader himself.

Ziona was also responsible for introducing formal education on a community-wide basis. During his lifetime, Tlangnuam acquired government-recognised schools up to higher secondary level, each bearing the prefix Chhuanthar. A football-field-sized open ground known as Chhuanthar Stadium was built for sports and mass gatherings. For festivals and official events, Ziona introduced a quasi-military system of ranked uniforms and parades for the membership.

The work ethic instituted by Chana and developed under Ziona made Tlangnuam one of the most economically productive communities in rural Mizoram. The movement received public recognition and support from the state government, including from successive Governors and Chief Ministers of Mizoram in person. Family members report that, except on religious days, Ziona himself worked from morning until evening, and would readily dispatch labour from his own household to assist neighbouring families in need.

In contrast to his more reclusive predecessors, Ziona adopted a comparatively outward-looking stance. He permitted members to participate in the wider Mizo civil society and to vote independently in government elections. The community functions as an official branch of the Young Mizo Association, the largest non-governmental organisation in Mizoram, and its women belong to the Mizoram Hmeichhe Insuihkhawm Pawl (MHIP), the largest Mizo women's organisation; the state has constructed a dedicated MHIP building at Tlangnuam.

Ziona instituted a weekly community service day. On Mondays, no member may attend to personal business; the elders draw up a schedule under which each able-bodied member is assigned community work according to their capacity, including the cleaning of streets, repair of roads, repair of others' houses, work on others' farms, and assistance to families in need of labour. The monthly tithe, a contribution of one-tenth of each family's earnings, is principally applied to this day's activities. Even children are expected to sweep the streets in the morning before going to school.

==== Death of Ziona and aftermath ====
Ziona died on 13 June 2021 at the age of 75 (in his 76th year). The community's initial response was unusual: family members reported that, after his body was brought home that night, his pulse and body warmth returned, and that an oximeter showed a stable pulse the following day. The family delayed the funeral for some 30 hours, with some sect members publicly maintaining that he was still alive, before declaring at 9 p.m. on 14 June that the pulse had stopped. Burial followed on 17 June 2021. No formal successor had been named at the time of his death; reports indicated that two of his sons were under consideration for the role of Hotupa.

== Beliefs and practices ==
The central theological theme of Lalpa Kohhran Thar is millennialism. The community holds itself to have been chosen to take part in the thousand-year reign of Jesus, an expectation it calls Kum Sang Rorel ("the thousand-year rule"), drawing on a literalist reading of Revelation chapter 20. The historian Vanlalpeka, writing in 2019, situates the movement within what James C. Scott has described as the Zomian pattern: a peripheral, semi-closed highland community that adopts religious and economic forms allowing it to remain partly outside the reach of state and ecclesiastical authority.

Mainstream Mizo Christian denominations have, since 1942, judged Lalpa Kohhran Thar to fall outside the bounds of orthodox Christianity. Members, however, identify themselves as Christian and consider the differences with other denominations to lie chiefly in social practice. As the community's public spokesman C. Lalrinthanga has put it, "where we differ is putting into practice what the Gospel tells us, like charity, hard work, honesty, helping thy neighbours, simplicity and equality. We also have a very strong Mizo influence in everything we do, unlike other churches where Mizo cultural practices have made way for Western-style rituals." Lalrinthanga's formulation, which presents the movement as a more thoroughly Mizo expression of Christian principle, is widely echoed within the community itself.

Football tournaments are organised twice a year. The first, in February, called Pindan Lehlamte Hun Chan ("Time for the Next-Door People"), commemorates deceased members; the second, in December, called Thilsiamte Hun Chan ("For Nature"), is dedicated to awareness of environmental conservation.

=== Polygamy ===
Polygamy is the most outwardly distinctive practice of Lalpa Kohhran Thar. Khuangtuaha is reported to have decreed that a man might marry as many wives as he could support. Members regard the practice as "divinely ordained". Although the rule is associated with Khuangtuaha, polygamy itself was introduced into the community by Chana, who married seven wives during the years at Hmawngkawn. Ziona offered a similar theological justification: "I believe God has chosen us to be like this [to have big families] ... I never wanted to get married but that's the path God has chosen for me. It's not my wish to keep marrying again and again."

Within the family Ziona's marriages were also framed as acts of social welfare, on the grounds that many of his wives came from impoverished or orphaned backgrounds. Senior wives are described by both insiders and visiting journalists as welcoming new arrivals without rivalry. Ziona's eldest son Nunparliana told the New York Post: "Most of the women whom my father married were poor and orphan women of this village. By marrying them, he has set an example in the history of mankind."

Polygamy is not, however, imposed as an obligation, and individual men are not free to take additional wives at will; the priests must approve each marriage. In practice, only the leadership and a small number of affluent members are eligible to maintain multiple wives. Vanlalpeka observes that within the community polygamy operates as a marker of status that reinforces the leadership of the Hotupa rather than as a generalised norm. Ziona's grandson Hmingthanzauva put it plainly: "My grandfather is specially appointed by God to have as many wives as possible and to look after them. But for me, having one wife and one son is quite enough. There is no rule or tradition as such that we have to follow polygamy, for me it's actually unbearable."

=== Festivals and ceremonies ===
The community follows a distinctive ritual calendar drawn from both Mizo and Christian sources. It observes Christmas and the New Year in the manner usual in Mizoram, but in place of Good Friday it observes the death anniversary of Khuangtuaha on 30 March. The foundation day of the sect, 12 June, is kept as Bawkte Kut ("Festival of the Hut"). Other major dates include 27 February (the death anniversary of Chana), 4 August (the death anniversary of Hualthangi) and 27 October (the birthday of an earlier figure of the movement).

Ziona's birthday, on 21 July, was celebrated throughout his life with church services, parades and choral performances, concluding with a communal feast. The occasion was typically observed over two days, the second of which is given over to khuallampui, a large-scale Mizo communal dance.

== Community life ==
The communal life of Lalpa Kohhran Thar has been described in journalistic accounts as "a blend of democracy and communism". Members choose their own profession, education and degree of engagement with public life, including voting in government elections. The majority are artisans, widely regarded in Mizoram for industry and craftsmanship. A smaller number are highly educated and hold public-sector posts. As a prominent example, C. Lalrinthanga, who joined the community in 2007 and serves as its public relations officer, is a banker employed by the Government of Mizoram. Other members work as physicians, engineers, civil servants, schoolteachers and members of the armed forces. All households contribute a monthly tithe used for community development and welfare, including support for vulnerable members. Nunparliana has been quoted as saying, "There's no poverty here because we share everything."

The community's productive output is in many ways more widely familiar in Mizoram than its religious life. Its best-known product is a heavy aluminium cooking pot popularly called the "Mizo cooker", along with other aluminium utensils. Almost every family operates either a carpentry workshop or a tinsmith's workshop, and products are exported to neighbouring regions. Carpentry is the community's principal trade, with approximately 70% of families wholly dependent on it. According to a 2019 study, of 140 households surveyed at Tlangnuam, 85 (about 61%) were engaged in carpentry, with an average annual income from carpentry of around Rs. 3,02,368, a figure considered substantial for a rural settlement in Mizoram. Doors, window frames and door panels are major lines, with door panels alone accounting for some 23% of carpentry output.

In 2020, the Small Industries Development Bank of India granted recognition through a Cluster Development Programme on Carpentry, with the community receiving approximately ₹50 million (about US$6.7 million) for the project. In 2012, following several major fires in different parts of Mizoram that left many families homeless, the community donated Mizo cookers and window frames to affected households. Since 2021, the Mizoram Science, Technology and Innovation Council, under the Directorate of Science and Technology, Government of Mizoram, has supported a sawdust briquette and charcoal production project at Chhuanthar Tlangnuam.

Many community members are smallholder farmers. In 2013, the state government declared Tlangnuam the "Best Village" in Mizoram under the New Land Use Policy (NLUP), citing in particular the cultivation and crafting of brooms. In 2014, the state government funded a community-scale cultivation of aloe vera for use in soap production. The soap industry was capitalised from the National Mission on Medicinal Plants under the National Medicinal Plants Board, Government of India. In 2014, the community appeared alongside the Bollywood actress Sakshi Tanwar in a television advertisement for a soap brand.

In Serchhip district elections the community forms a significant voting bloc. Although Ziona instructed members to vote independently and to support the party of their choice, they have historically tended to vote in unison, drawing the attention of candidates across parties. As one of Ziona's wives, Rinkimi, observed: "When we go to vote, we always cast our ballots for the same candidate or party. That means more than 160-odd votes are assured from one family."

== Scholarly interpretation ==
Academic treatments of Lalpa Kohhran Thar are scarce. The fullest sociological study to date is Vanlalpeka's 2019 article "Escaping Prophets in Zomia: The Sect of Ziona", published in Sociology and Anthropology, which positions the movement within the Zomia framework developed by James C. Scott. In this reading, the community is treated less as a heterodox Christian denomination than as a new religious movement of upland Southeast Asia, whose semi-closed economy, polygamous kinship structure, indigenous ritual elements and prophet-led organisation function together to allow it to remain partly outside state and ecclesiastical capture. Vanlalpeka explicitly compares the movement to other prophet-led upland religious formations in the wider Mongoloid belt of Southeast Asia.

Mizo-language treatments of the movement, from within the orthodox Mizo Christian tradition, take a more critical view. James Dokhuma's Zoram Tualto Kohhran Chanchin ("Indigenous Denominations in Mizoram", 1997) and Vanlalchhuanga's An Zirtirnate ("Their Teachings", 1984) treat Lalpa Kohhran Thar as one of several syncretic tualto kohhran (indigenous denominations) that arose out of, and were eventually rejected by, the Presbyterian Church. V. L. Zaikima's monograph Lalpa kohhran thar: Khuangtuaha pâwl-Châna pâwl (Aizawl: Lengchhawn Press, 2011) is the most detailed single Mizo-language account, devoted entirely to the founding generations and their festivals.

== World record listings ==
By 2005, with 15 wives and over 100 children, Ziona could have qualified for entry in the Guinness World Records as the head of the world's largest family. A formal nomination followed in 2007, but when officials visited Tlangnuam to verify the claim and to take documentary photographs, Ziona declined. In 2011 he explained to a CNN reporter that the reason he had declined the listing was simply that "he doesn't want the publicity". Nonetheless, several news outlets, popular-record bodies and government tourism sources continue to refer to him as the Guinness world record holder for the largest family; in fact, Guinness maintains no category for the largest human family.

The family was, however, formally listed by the World Record Academy in 2011 as the "Biggest Family", at the time citing 39 wives, 94 children, 14 daughters-in-law and 33 grandchildren. The same year, The Wall Street Journal described the household as "The Biggest Family in the World". In 2019, the London World Records similarly named Ziona "head of the world's biggest family". In 2011, Ripley's Believe It or Not! observed: "It's a safe bet that Ziona Chana would not be impressed watching 19 Kids and Counting or Sister Wives. The 75-year-old Indian man had 39 wives, 94 children and 33 grandchildren and 1 great grandchild." Ziona and his family were included in 2013's Ripley Believe It or Not Book 9.

== See also ==
- Polygyny in India
- Mizo people
- Mizoram Presbyterian Church Synod
- Zomia (geography)
- Mizo National Front uprising
- Ziona
