= List of Sister Wives episodes =

Sister Wives is an American reality television series broadcast on TLC. It documents the lives of the formerly polygamist Brown family, now living mostly separate lives. The first season premiered with a one-hour debut on September 26, 2010.

== Series overview ==
Season	Episodes		Originally released	
Season	Episodes		First released	Last released
1	7		September 26, 2010	November 21, 2010
2	11		March 13, 2011	June 5, 2011
3	11		September 25, 2011	November 27, 2011
4	11		May 13, 2012	June 24, 2012
5	8		November 18, 2012	December 30, 2012
6	18	10	July 21, 2013	September 22, 2013
6	18	8	December 29, 2013	June 26, 2014
7	8		June 8, 2014	July 27, 2014
8	7		January 4, 2015	March 1, 2015
9	10		September 13, 2015	November 22, 2015
10	9		March 13, 2016	June 5, 2016
11	10		November 27, 2016	January 29, 2017
12	11		January 7, 2018	April 1, 2018
13	11		January 20, 2019	April 21, 2019
14	15		January 5, 2020	April 12, 2020
15	11		March 13, 2021	June 5, 2021
16	10		November 21, 2021	February 20, 2022
17	14		September 11, 2022	January 8, 2023
18	14		August 20, 2023	December 19, 2023
19	25		September 15, 2024	May 18, 2025
20	15		September 28, 2025	January 4, 2026
21	TBA		October 4, 2026	2026

== Episodes ==
=== Season 1 (2010) ===
No. overall	No. in season	Title	Original release date	US viewers (millions)
1	1	"Meet Kody & the Wives"	September 26, 2010	2.26
The one-hour premiere episode introduces viewers to Kody Brown, his three wives Meri, Janelle and Christine, and their 12 children. They live in a ranch-style home that, although interconnected, is subdivided into three separate apartments which give each wife her own bedroom, kitchen and living space. Eventually, Kody and his wives tell the children he is courting a fourth wife, Robyn, who herself already has three children. Meanwhile, the wives explain they do not plan to force their children into polygamist lifestyles or arrange their marriages for them, but rather will encourage them to make their own choices. The children attend a polygamist cooperative school, while Kody and Janelle both work full-time as Meri pursues a long-delayed college degree. The family discusses their strong spiritual faith, and the episode includes both blessings at dinner and an evening family prayer. The episode also highlights the fact that Kody operates on a rotating schedule that dictates which wife he will spend the night with. Although Kody is intimate with all three of his wives, they make clear that the women never sleep with each other, a concept they consider immoral. The episode ends with Kody going on a date with Robyn.
2	2	"Courting a Fourth Wife"	October 3, 2010	1.88
This episode focuses on Kody's courtship of Robyn, marking the first time he has courted a woman since his third marriage 16 years earlier. Robyn lives five hours away from his home, so Kody must travel far and spend a great amount of time away from the rest of his family to date her. Robyn, who has three children under the age of 10, explains that although she grew up in a polygamist family, she has previously kept the lifestyle a secret until participating on Sister Wives. Meri, who had previously encouraged Kody to marry Janelle and Christine, explains that she met Robyn and encouraged Kody to court her as well. Nevertheless, the prospect of a fourth wife requires some adjustment for the three wives, who fear being replaced as companions, as well as for their children, who have grown up with three mothers their entire lives.
3	3	"Wives on the Move"	October 3, 2010	2.13
Robyn is moving into a new house about half a mile from the Brown home. Since Kody and Robyn are only engaged, she cannot yet live in the house with the rest of his family. Although ultimately supportive of the idea of the new union, Meri, Janelle and Christine continue to experience conflicted feelings about the change it will bring to the family. Meri experiences an emotional breakdown and talks about the difficulties of being in a polygamist marriage, and Christine grows particularly upset when she learns that Kody sealed his engagement to Robyn with a kiss, since he never kissed his other wives until they were married. Robyn feels remorse for hurting the other wives' feelings, but expresses happiness and excitement towards joining the family. The whole family helps Robyn load her belongings into the moving truck and bring her and her children to their new home.
4	4	"Third Wife in Labor"	October 10, 2010	1.89
Kody escorts third wife Christine to the hospital for a checkup, since she's slightly past her due date, and they decide to induce labor that day. The hospital staff are very accepting of polygamists and talk casually to Kody and Christine about their family. Although polygamists often give birth at home in the family unit, Christine suffered a miscarriage the previous year and does not want to risk it again. Robyn takes care of Christine's younger children while she is at the hospital. At one point, Kody stops home and, before returning to the hospital, tries to kiss Robyn off-camera; when the cameras nevertheless capture the moment, Kody admits he did not want to be seen kissing his fiancée while his wife was in labor. 14-year-old Aspyn, Christine's oldest biological daughter, decides to go with Kody to the hospital to watch the labor. Christine gives birth to daughter Truly after a relatively easy labor, and the entire family visits the hospital to see Christine and meet Truly.
5	5	"1st Wife's 20th Anniversary"	October 10, 2010	2.05
Meri's teenager tells Kody they want to study pre-med at the Naval Academy in Annapolis, Maryland; Kody is very proud, but fears prejudices against their polygamist family will prevent them from getting in. Later, Kody and Meri go to Mexico to celebrate their 20th wedding anniversary. Meri discusses her sadness about her infertility problems and the jealousy that has arisen from Kody's recent courtship and engagement to Robyn. When Meri asks how Kody would feel if she had a relationship with another man, he says he finds the idea repulsive, although he admits that, as a polygamist, his reaction sounds hypocritical. Kody apologizes for his past impatience with Meri's jealousy issues and expresses his love and devotion to her. Later, he suggests having another child through in vitro fertilisation, but she turns down the idea as she is only interested in natural conception.
6	6	"A Fourth Wife to Be"	October 17, 2010	2.67
As Robyn's wedding to Kody approaches, he and his other wives clash over whether Robyn is entitled to as much time with Kody as they are: Robyn and Janelle feel that, as fiancée, Robyn is entitled to equal time with Kody, while Meri and Christine feel she is not until they are married. Despite continued tension over the changes in the family due to the addition of Robyn, the four women mostly get along well. Wanting the sister wives to feel involved, Robyn invites them along to look at dresses, although she doesn't say which dress she's choosing: it's a surprise. Kody joins the women to look at wedding cakes and possible reception locations. During a later interview for the show, Kody reveals he chose the wedding dress himself, which prompts Christine to walk away mid-interview. When she returns, the three wives say they felt betrayed by Kody's actions, but he apologizes and the five reconcile.
7	7	"Four Wives and Counting..."	October 17, 2010	2.74
The first-season finale episode features the wedding of Kody and Robyn. As the day begins, the family deals with various stresses leading up to the wedding, including the wedding invitations having the wrong address for the ceremony. Robyn struggles to prepare herself while maintaining her hyperactive and mischievous children. For religious reasons, the cameras are not permitted at the ceremony and it was not televised. During an outdoor reception, Meri, Janelle and Christine present Robyn with a Claddagh ring to welcome her into the family. As the other wives reflect on their own wedding ceremonies, Janelle, who did not originally come from a polygamist family, reveals that she lost most of her family and friends when she married Kody because they were disgusted that she decided to enter into polygamy. As Kody and Robyn prepare to leave for their honeymoon, all four sister wives reflect on how happy they are and how much they look forward to the future.

=== Season 2 (2011) ===
No. overall	No. in season	Title	Original release date	US viewers (millions)
8	1	"Browns Out of Hiding"	March 13, 2011	2.23
After years of hiding their lifestyle, Kody and his four wives are off to New York to appear on national television for the first time as open polygamists. Meanwhile, back home, the Brown family kids embark on their first day of public school.
9	2	"Free Range Browns"	March 20, 2011	1.77
The Browns travel to Wyoming to visit Kody's family ranch in hopes of finding some tranquility in the wake of the police investigation involving the family. Also, viewers find out about Kody's family history.
10	3	"The Price of Polygamy"	March 27, 2011	1.74
Kody and Janelle spend some one-to-one time together during a private camping trip which results in a discussion about family finances. Meanwhile, back at home, Robyn begins to worry about being a financial burden on the family.
11	4	"Carving into Polygamy"	April 3, 2011	1.44
The Brown family celebrates Halloween, which includes having to come up with 21 different costume ideas and carving 24 pumpkins. Later on, 16 of the Browns hit the neighborhood to trick-or-treat.
12	5	"Wife #3 Hits Sin City"	April 10, 2011	1.41
Christine and her children, along with Kody, head to their favorite vacation destination, Las Vegas. Back at home, Meri takes the rest of the family out for a night of bowling.
13	6	"Polygamist Party"	April 17, 2011	1.39
The wives invite their monogamous friends over for dinner. Also, Meri goes to the doctor for a cancer screening and finds out that she has a benign polyp in her colon, unlike her deceased sister.
14	7	"The Brown Family Decision"	May 8, 2011	1.52
The Browns celebrate Christmas by heading to a snowbound cabin in the mountains, escaping the pressure of the ongoing police investigation at home. Later, the family make the big announcement that they're moving to Las Vegas.
15	8	"Sister Wives in Holiday Crisis"	May 8, 2011	1.59
The wives have trouble accepting that this will be their last Christmas in Utah and the mounting tension from the ongoing police investigation leads to massive changes in the family dynamic.
16	9	"No Place For Home"	May 15, 2011	1.52
Kody, Meri, and Robyn search for a new house in Las Vegas but, after arriving, they quickly learn that there are no polygamist houses available. Back at home in Utah, the rest of the family plans a surprise birthday party for Meri.
17	10	"Gambling on the Future"	May 22, 2011	1.83
Kody and the wives prepare for the move by telling the younger children and packing up their homes. Later, plans turn to panic when the media gets wind of the news.
18	11	"Sister Wives in the City of Sin"	June 5, 2011	2.76
The Browns arrive in Las Vegas and search for a home where they'll be able to rebuild their lives. Later, Robyn announces to the public that she is pregnant.

=== Season 3 (2011) ===
No. overall	No. in season	Title	Original release date	US viewers (millions)
21	1	"The Announcement"	September 25, 2011	1.77
Robyn finally announces her pregnancy to the rest of the family, starting with Meri. As the Browns continue to try to adjust to their new lives in Las Vegas, the older teens' discontent over their new life starts to bubble to the surface.
22	2	"Teen Sex Talk"	October 2, 2011	2.40
Kody, Christine and Janelle experiment with working in real estate. Meanwhile, the teenagers are beginning to go out and make new friends in Las Vegas.
23	3	"4 Houses, 4 Relationships"	October 2, 2011	2.52
Robyn has a pregnancy scare and rushes to her midwife to find out what's wrong. Meanwhile, the other wives decide to make over one room in each of their houses.
24	4	"The 4 Lives of Kody Brown"	October 9, 2011	2.37
Kody is followed for four days as he moves each day to the house of a different wife, and he opens up about how his life has changed since the move to Las Vegas. Also, the gender of Robyn and Kody's baby is revealed.
25	5	"Defending Polygamy"	October 16, 2011	2.32
Kody and his wives return to his hometown for the first time as open polygamists, and he's not sure how his childhood friends will receive them. Also, Robyn and Kody announce the name of their baby.
26	6	"The Wives Diet Woes"	October 23, 2011	2.02
The wives open up about their attempts to lose weight and then head to the gym for a body-fat analysis.
27	7	"July 4th Rebellion"	October 30, 2011	2.11
The Brown family plan to have some family fun during camping on the Fourth of July, but the teenagers have other ideas. Christine's daughter, Ysabel, and Robyn's daughter, Breanna, move into Meri's house temporarily.
28	8	"Another Wife"	November 6, 2011	1.76
The Browns respond to questions surrounding courting another wife and dealing with jealousy. A couple from Utah visit.
29	9	"College-Bound Browns"	November 13, 2011	2.20
The Brown family is invited to Boston by a religious professor to talk to her students.
30	10	"Sister Wives on the Strip"	November 20, 2011	1.87
The sister wives get makeovers and then head to the strip for a night on the town while Kody stays home and watches all the kids. How will they react when they come face-to-face with all the adult entertainment Vegas has to offer?
31	11	"Kody Climbs Into the Ring"	November 20, 2011	2.00
Kody heads for the Las Vegas strip for a guys' night out on the town, testing his wrestling skills against a mixed martial arts fighter and answering his friends' questions about his lifestyle. Meanwhile, the wives help set up Robyn's new nursery.

=== Season 4 (2012) ===
No. overall	No. in season	Title	Original release date	US viewers (millions)
33	1	"Sister Wives Separated"	May 13, 2012	2.03
It's the Browns' first Christmas in Vegas and the wives are separated in four rental homes. Desperate to get the family back together, Kody has his hands full chopping down a Christmas tree and finding the home that will bring them all together again.
34	2	"Polygamist Date Nights"	May 20, 2012	1.85
Date Night is important in a plural marriage and Kody needs to bring his A-game to keep his wives happy. From hitting the slopes to releasing pent up aggression shooting paintballs, all four wives are expecting Kody to bring the magic and some romance.
35	3	"Brutal Honesty"	May 27, 2012	1.37
As the Sister Wives prepare for Kody's birthday, Christine tries to reconcile with Robyn by opening up about the problems she's had since Robyn joined the family.
36	4	"You Asked, Browns Answers"	May 27, 2012	1.40
Everyone has questions about polygamy. Today, the Browns answer the toughest questions submitted by viewers. From contraception and gay children to Kody's favorite and least favorite traits of each wife, nothing is held back.
37	5	"Infertility & Nesting"	June 3, 2012	1.98
The Browns apply for separate mortgages as they dream of getting their family into adjacent homes. Meanwhile, Janelle is still determined to open a gym. Later, Meri discloses the details of her past fertility problems.
38	6	"4 Wives, 4 Valentines"	June 3, 2012	2.04
This year, Kody takes his younger daughters to a daddy-daughter Valentine's dance at their school.
39	7	"Brown Boys Do Vegas"	June 10, 2012	1.65
Kody ditches his four wives for his three brothers as they hit up the city of sin. They're cruising on motorcycles, hanging out at a biker bar and shooting guns.
40	8	"No Place Like Home"	June 10, 2012	1.66
Four of Kody's eldest children head back to Utah to visit their family and friends but, more importantly, to visit the happy home they left behind.
41	9	"Meri's Baby Decision"	June 17, 2012	1.92
Kody makes good on his promise to Meri, escaping to Mexico for a romantic getaway. They climb ancient temples and swim with dolphins but, despite all the romance, the conversation turns serious when Kody asks Meri about Robyn's offer of surrogacy.
42	10	"Brown Family Confessions"	June 17, 2012	1.81
The Browns invite viewers into their home to answer more in-depth questions about their plural marriage lifestyle. But this time, they invite their teenagers to join the discussion.
43	11	"Leaving the Nest"	June 24, 2012	2.21
As high school graduation nears, Logan finally decides which college he will attend. Meanwhile, Kody and the wives are on the verge of fulfilling their dream of bringing the family back together.

=== Season 5 (2012) ===
No. overall	No. in season	Title	Original release date	US viewers (millions)
45	1	"Polygamist Debt Threat"	November 18, 2012	2.78
The Browns try to solidify their family bonds by investing in property where they can build four homes on one cul-de-sac.
46	2	"Kody Begs for an Answer"	November 25, 2012	2.29
Kody and the wives attend parent-teacher conferences, and Logan graduates from high school. Meri feels pressured to have another child, and the wives have some conflict over the size of Meri's house.
47	3	"More Sister Wives"	December 2, 2012	2.44
The Browns plan a vacation with their polygamist friends, the Darger family, as they head to the beach for some polygamist fun in the sun. For the first time, viewers meet another polygamist family and discover how they're the same and different from the Browns.
48	4	"Polygamist Cults"	December 9, 2012	2.08
The dark side of polygamy is uncovered when the Brown teenagers volunteer for an organization that helps people escape from abusive polygamist families.
49	5	"Mourning the Loss"	December 16, 2012	1.75
Tensions rise as the Sister Wives fight for the bonus features they want for each house. Later, the Brown family digs deep when the family dog is ailing. A compromise leaves them all in tears.
50	6	"Confronting Failure"	December 16, 2012	1.98
With the Sister Wives living separately for over a year now, the Brown family structure is falling apart. After stressing out over finances, the wives try hard to start a web business, and Christine makes another attempt to pass her real estate exam.
51	7	"Polygamist Pilgrimage Into the Past"	December 23, 2012	1.86
The wives plan a dream pilgrimage across country to Nauvoo, Illinois, the birthplace of American polygamy. But the three-day road trip turns into much more than they bargained for as tempers start to flare and relationships get tested.
52	8	"Hard to Say Goodbye"	December 30, 2012	2.64
As the Browns prepare a proper send off for Logan's graduation, Kody and the wives push hard to get moved into their new homes before Christmas.

=== Season 6 (2013-2014) ===
No. overall	No. in season	Title	Original release date	US viewers (millions)
Part 1
54	1	"Picking Up the Pieces"	July 21, 2013	2.57
In the Season 6 premiere, the Browns are finally able to see their four new homes which are close to each other. The wives' tempers are raised when issues arise within the family business. Robyn talks to Meri regarding her surrogacy offer.
55	2	"Four Lives of Kody's Wives"	July 28, 2013	1.97
Since leaving Utah, the wives have now settled into four separate lives. Janelle continues her weight-loss battle. Robyn fights to keep the family business afloat. Meri works hard to repair her relationship with her child, and Christine rethinks her career.
56	3	"Big Boy Panties!"	August 4, 2013	1.93
Focused on their goal of being in all four houses by Christmas, problems in the building process threaten to ruin the Browns' dream. Aspyn and Meri's only child discuss college plans. One wife decides to possibly jump ship on the family business.
57	4	"Odd Wife Out"	August 11, 2013	2.13
The builders put the final touches on the new homes and all the wives must close the mortgages on the homes.
58	5	"Christmas Surprise"	August 18, 2013	2.14
In order to get everyone into their new homes for the holidays, the Brown family celebrate Christmas a week late and Kody challenges his wives to a contest. Robyn gives Kody a special gift.
59	6	"Robyn's Secret"	August 25, 2013	2.34
As a way to symbolize putting down their roots in Vegas, the family buries a time capsule. The family holds their first church service in their new homes. Robyn reveals some shocking news from her past.
60	7	"Polygamy Questions Answered"	September 1, 2013	1.75
In this special, the Brown family answers viewer questions.
61	8	"A Wife Decides"	September 8, 2013	2.14
Janelle continues to struggle with her weight loss journey while Meri and Kody come to a decision about the offer from Robyn about being their surrogate.
62	9	"Sister Wives On the Ropes"	September 15, 2013	2.37
The Brown family attend an anti-polygamy debate that Christine's estranged aunt is also attending. The Brown stand strong in their beliefs. Meri and Kody receive some news about their finances.
63	10	"Polygamist Marriage Therapy"	September 22, 2013	2.01
Kody and his wives attend a couple's retreat where they will work on the issues in their relationships and discover the cause of the conflicts they are having.
Part 2
65	11	"Mother-in-Law Invasion"	December 29, 2013	2.41
On Mother's day all the wives's moms (nine in all) come for a visit. Kody and the wives discuss how to pay for college for the kids starting school
66	12	"Boys Night Out"	January 5, 2014	2.04
Kody and his former best friend reunite in Vegas and are ready to rekindle their friendship. Meri is starting to fear the empty nest that is fast approaching.
67	13	"Polygamist Flash Mob"	January 12, 2014	2.00
Meri suffers from a total meltdown. The Brown family throws a party where a fortune teller tells Kody his future
68	14	"While the Wives Are Away..."	January 19, 2014	1.44
Meri, Christine, Janelle and Robyn take their first trip without Kody to San Francisco while Kody stays at home with 16 of the children. Solomon goes to San Francisco with the mothers.
69	15	"Browns in Crisis"	January 26, 2014	2.41
When Truly begins to not feel well the family thinks it's the flu, but when her health takes a serious decline she is brought to the emergency room while party preparations are being made for Meri's only child.
70	16	"Tragedy in the Family"	February 9, 2014	1.94
The family is preparing for a fast-approaching special family celebration and enable the help of a party planner. However preparations are interrupted when the family suffers a sudden tragedy, the second in just 2 months.
71	17	"Celebration Countdown"	February 16, 2014	1.82
The family continues to prepare for their long-awaited commitment ceremony, however, a disastrous dress rehearsal leaves Kody and the wives feeling disheartened and wondering if all the planning will work out the way they hope.
72	18	"The Commitment Celebration"	February 23, 2014	2.23
The family finally have their commitment ceremony where the teenagers plan a special surprise.

=== Season 7 (2014) ===
No. overall	No. in season	Title	Original release date	US viewers (millions)
74	1	"Meri Drops a Bomb"	June 8, 2014	1.61
The Browns receive a visit from an investor for their jewelry line. Mykelti brings home a boyfriend, so Kody and Christine sit them down and discuss the rules of their relationship. The family celebrates Dayton and Meri's birthdays. Kody and Jenelle celebrate their wedding anniversary. Robyn reveals that she needs help on the business before they even think about having another baby; meanwhile, Meri reveals that she's going back to school and Kody takes her out for her birthday.
75	2	"Polygamists in a Shark Tank"	June 15, 2014	1.56
When the jewelry business starts to overwhelm the wives, they want to hire employees they seek the help from investors.
76	3	"The Big Decision"	June 22, 2014	1.48
While trying to secure investors for the jewelry business one wife makes a mistake that may cost them the deal. Meri travels to Utah to catch up with an old friend and Janelle continues her weight loss journey.
77	4	"Vegas Surprise"	June 22, 2014	1.24
The family throws a Vegas themed party to thank Kody and to look at how the family has grown.
78	5	"Growing up Polygamist"	June 29, 2014	1.25
A look at how the teenagers handle college, dating and the uncertain future of potentially becoming a polygamist. Janelle continues to struggle with her weight loss.
79	6	"Four Wives in Two RVs"	July 6, 2014	1.39
The family take a spring break vacation in an RV where they contend with very little room. They travel along the historical RT 66 and stop in Missouri to meet up with a Polygamist family that is non-mormon.
80	7	"From Monogamy to Polygamy"	July 13, 2014	1.64
On the last stop of their road trip the Browns meet up with a Christian polygamist family and the two families discover they have very different ways of running things within their perspective families. The strict and rigid discipline of the Christian family shock the Browns who are more flexible.
81	8	"Every Brown Revealed"	July 20, 2014	1.61
Photos and videos bring a new understanding to a side of the Browns not well understood. Also, secrets and more details are revealed that shed light into an ever deeper look at the family.

=== Season 8 (2015) ===
No. overall	No. in season	Title	Original release date	US viewers (millions)
83	1	"Growing Up & Moving Out"	January 4, 2015	N/A
When 2 more of the Brown family daughters graduate high school in the same year, the parents plan a hilarious way to embarrass them at their graduation parties. Janelle is very revealing to the family therapist and Robyn's oldest son goes into surgery.
84	2	"A Family Meltdown"	January 11, 2015	N/A
The Browns plan another road trip to meet a fellow polygamist family and also visit their Utah home where they are overwhelmed by the emotions of the past.
85	3	"Courting Another Wife"	January 18, 2015	N/A
An argument between Kody and Christine continues to escalate as the family approaches the final destination of their family road trip.
86	4	"One More Woman in Kody's Life"	January 25, 2015	N/A
When Christine's two oldest daughters move out, Christine's mother moves in. When Robyn struggles with her ex-husband Meri comforts her.
87	5	"Anthropologists Move In"	February 8, 2015	N/A
The Browns make the decision to allow 2 anthropology students to move into their home.
89	6	"First a Verdict, Then a Lawyer"	February 15, 2015	N/A
The Browns worry about how the anthropology students will view their family. Meri makes a big decision.
91	7	"Divorce"	March 1, 2015	N/A
Meri legally divorces Kody so that he can officially marry Robyn and adopt Robyn's three eldest children.

=== Season 9 (2015) ===
No. overall	No. in season	Title	Original release date	US viewers (millions)
93	1	"A Secret Marriage & Sister Wives Unseen"	September 13, 2015	1.53
The Browns address many questions as Meri and Kody's divorce becomes official.
94	2	"Wrestling with Adoption"	September 20, 2015	1.45
Meri gets emotional when she tells the Brown children about divorcing their dad and the reasons behind it, so Kody can adopt Robyn's kids from her first marriage.
96	3	"Marriage Counseling Texas Style"	September 27, 2015	1.33
Christine and Kodi take a trip to Galveston for their anniversary and it turns into couple's therapy. Kodi and Robyn start the process of adopting Robyn's children.
98	4	"Just Trying to Stay Afloat"	October 4, 2015	1.31
The family enters a race at a Las Vegas festival
99	5	"More Girls Than Kody Can Handle?"	October 11, 2015	1.32
When Kody admits he relates better to his sons, he decides to try and improve his relationship with some of the younger girls.
100	6	"Robyn's Big Announcement"	October 18, 2015	1.40
When Robyn signs the official adoption paperwork the last obstacle is to face the judge before the adoption is final.
101	7	"A Judge Decides"	October 25, 2015	1.46
Kody will face a judge and learn if he will be able to adopt Robyn's 3 oldest children. And Kody and Janelle's oldest daughter Madison makes a surprising announcement to the family.
102	8	November 1, 2015	1.41	
When the Brown family throws a party to celebrate the adoption they get more than they bargained for.
103	9	"A Boy or A Girl?"	November 8, 2015	1.62
The family takes a trip to Alaska and Logan's new girlfriend goes along as well as Maddie's new boyfriend. Robyn and Kody reveal the gender of their baby to the family.
104	10	"Meri Catfished"	November 15, 2015	2.25
While on the trip to Alaska Meri reveals that she has been involved with a man online.

=== Season 10 (2016) ===
No. overall	No. in season	Title	Original release date	US viewers (millions)
106	1	"Catfishing Fallout"	May 8, 2016	1.56
After Meri admits she was involved with a man online (that turned out to be a woman) the family is shocked
107	2	"Pawn Shops and Polygamy Perks"	May 15, 2016	1.44
Meri and Kody try to get past the catfishing incident and Mykelti and Aspen move out of their apartment
108	3	"Confessions"	May 15, 2016	N/A
Meri is still dealing with emotions over the catfishing incident but wants to attend therapy with Janelle in hopes of working on past conflicts however Janelle is concerned that it will open old wounds
109	4	"Thanksgiving: The Good, The Bad, The Ugly"	May 22, 2016	1.23
Right after their therapy session Janelle and Meri decide to decorate for Thanksgiving in an attempt to continue to work on their relationship and old issues. However, things are still strained.
110	5	"Unforgiven"	May 29, 2016	N/A
When Meri buys a gift for Kody she hopes it will help to make amends for the catfishing incident. Madison finds the perfect wedding dress and Meri's only child pulls away from both her and the church
111	6	"Baby Sister is Born"	June 5, 2016	N/A
Robyn gives birth to the newest member of the Brown family: Ariella Mae. Kody and the wives have decided on the location of this year's spring break trip, and announce it to the rest of the family.
112	7	"Meri Makes Amends"	June 12, 2016	N/A
Meri gives Kody his late birthday present, which is highly appreciated from her sister wives. Meri and Janelle talk to their therapist, Nancy, about the Thanksgiving project and how they both feel about the progress in their relationship. The whole Brown family, including Christine's mother Annie, Robyn's cousin, Maddie's fiancé Caleb and Logan's girlfriend Michelle, travel to Hawaii. Maddie and Caleb and Logan and Michelle go on a double date.
113	8	"Kody Behind the Scenes"	June 12, 2016	N/A
Some of Kody’s biggest secrets are revealed!
114	9	"Hawaiian Vacation Erupts"	June 19, 2016	N/A
A vacation in Hawaii turns into several family battles. Kody takes time away with Meri to work on their relationship

=== Season 11 (2016-2017) ===
No. overall	No. in season	Title	Original release date	US viewers (millions)
116	1	"It's Worse Than We Thought"	November 27, 2016	N/A
The family prepares for Madison's wedding and Mykelti reveals some shocking news of her own. In an attempt to mend the things between Meri and their child together, Kody realizes that his own relationship with Meri is still in trouble
117	2	"Kody Takes Responsibility"	December 4, 2016	N/A
Mykelti and Madison both race to the altar. Janelle and Meri continue their therapy and Kody tries to encourage his child with Meri to forgive their mother for the catfish incident
118	3	"He Pops the Question"	December 4, 2016	N/A
Madison tells everyone her plans for the wedding and there is another proposal
119	4	"Embarrassing the Sister Wives"	December 11, 2016	N/A
A windstorm causes big problems. Madison receives an embarrassing gift, and at the bridal shower things don't go as planned. Mykelti and Toni make an announcement
120	5	"The Dress Doesn't Fit"	December 11, 2016	N/A
It's the week before the wedding and the whole family travels to Wyoming. Maddie has a meltdown
121	6	"Maddie Gets Married"	December 18, 2016	N/A
It's Maddie's big day and Kody is unprepared
122	7	"Guide to Wedded Bliss"	December 25, 2016	N/A
Relive special moments from past weddings and ceremonies in the Brown family
123	8	"Another Catfishing"	January 1, 2017	N/A
Meri talks to another woman who was involved with a catfish but Kodi is not sure if it's a good idea. Mykelti starts the planning for her wedding
124	9	"A Shocking Revelation"	January 8, 2017	N/A
Meri and Kody's only child makes a shocking announcement and the family takes a trip to a mountain resort where Meri continues to struggle in her relationship with her sole progeny. Meri's child is angry at their mom for the catfish incident
125	10	"The Newlyweds vs The Browns"	January 15, 2017	N/A
A fun family game to see who knows who better

=== Season 12 (2018) ===
No. overall	No. in season	Title	Original release date	US viewers (millions)
128	1	"Meri Moving?"	January 7, 2018	N/A
The Browns meet with Tony's family and Meri travels to Utah for a potential business venture
129	2	"Groomzilla"	January 14, 2018	N/A
Mykelti and Tony go shopping for a dress. The sister wives travel to Utah to see the B&B Meri wants to buy. They are concerned it will pull Meri away. News from Madison leaves Janelle in tears
130	3	"I Will Survive"	January 21, 2018	N/A
Mykelti has her bridal shower and Janelle gets emotional. Maddie tells the family her big news
131	4	"Meri's Crazy Idea"	January 28, 2018	N/A
Meri has big news about her B&B but it is not what the family expected. The wedding rehearsal for Mykelti's wedding does not go as planned.
132	5	"PolygaMexicamist Wedding"	February 11, 2018	N/A
A wedding that brings Mykelti and Tony's families' traditions together.
133	6	"Meeting Mariah's Girlfriend"	February 18, 2018	N/A
Meri's only child and their girlfriend travel to Washington D.C. for the march for women and invite Meri and Janelle but Kody has concerns
134	7	"Risking Arrest"	February 25, 2018	N/A
Utah legislation is voting to strengthen laws against polygamy and the Browns are very upset. They would like to go to Utah to attend a protest put on by friends but risk getting arrested
135	8	"The Truth Comes Out"	March 4, 2018	N/A
Maddie has her baby shower but Christine receives some devastating news.
136	9	"The Longest Labor"	March 11, 2018	N/A
Meri and Kody travel to the B&B and Maddie goes into labor
137	10	"Confronting Meri"	March 18, 2018	N/A
Even as the Browns bask in the glow of their first grandchild, tensions emerge: Meri finds out that all the wives were at the birth, except her. Intense therapy sessions fail to resolve the hurt, so Christine battles Meri in a lumberjack match!
138	11	"Game Night!"	March 25, 2018	N/A
It's game night at the Browns, and it's about to get a little crazy. The family gets competitive as Mykelti and Gwendlyn host a Kody Brown on a Pole Match. It was inspired by the Judy Bagwell on a Forklift Match from WCW New Blood Rising in 2000. There’s much noise and chaos, and there are punishments for the losers, so the stakes are high!

=== Season 13 (2019) ===
No. overall	No. in season	Title	Original release date	US viewers (millions)
142	1	"Meri, On Her Own..."	January 20, 2019	1.53
143	2	"Sister Wives Secrets"	January 27, 2019	1.42
144	3	"Kody Wants Out"	February 10, 2019	1.33
145	4	"Kody's Shocking Move"	February 17, 2019	1.55
146	5	"Mariah's Big Announcement"	February 24, 2019	1.26
147	6	"Flagstaff Flirtation"	March 3, 2019	1.57
148	7	"Divided We Move"	March 10, 2019	1.52
149	8	"Aspyn's Royal Wedding"	March 17, 2019	1.52
150	9	"Kody's Secret Plan"	March 24, 2019	N/A
151	10	"Moving Meltdowns"	March 31, 2019	N/A
152	11	"Leaving Las Vegas"	April 7, 2019	N/A

=== Season 14 (2020) ===
No. overall	No. in season	Title	Original release date	US viewers (millions)
155	1	"Kicked Out"	January 5, 2020	1.73
156	2	"Happier Alone?"	January 5, 2020	1.73
157	3	"Lonely In Flagstaff"	January 12, 2020	1.86
158	4	"Four Wives, One House?"	January 19, 2020	2.00
159	5	"A Not So Merry Christmas"	January 26, 2020	1.94
160	6	"An Awkward Valentine's Day"	February 9, 2020	1.66
161	7	"Why Not One House?"	February 16, 2020	1.85
162	8	"Doubting Polygamy"	February 23, 2020	1.86
163	9	"This Land Is Your Land... Or Hers?"	March 1, 2020	2.05
164	10	"A Breaking Point"	March 8, 2020	2.19
165	11	"Being Gay and Religious"	March 15, 2020	2.04
166	12	"Robyn vs. Kody"	March 22, 2020	2.40
167	13	"The Heat Is On"	March 29, 2020	2.50
168	14	"Baby Steps"	April 5, 2020	2.39
169	15	"Two Moms, Their Daughter, and a Baby"	April 12, 2020	2.38

=== Season 15 (2021) ===
No. overall	No. in season	Title	Original release date	US viewers (millions)
170	1	"Being Strong or Being a Bitch"	February 14, 2021	1.43
171	2	"Felons No More"	February 21, 2021	1.48
172	3	"Robyn the Peacemaker"	February 28, 2021	1.56
173	4	"The Basement Wife"	March 7, 2021	1.43
174	5	"Polygamists in a Pandemic"	March 14, 2021	1.50
175	6	"Different Wives and Rules"	March 21, 2021	1.42
176	7	"Birthday Breakdown"	March 28, 2021	1.43
177	8	"Can I Light You Up?"	April 4, 2021	1.43
178	9	"A Family Stuck"	April 11, 2021	1.63
179	10	"Polygamy Hell"	April 18, 2021	1.56
180	11	"Everything's Upside Down"	April 18, 2021	1.56

=== Season 16 (2021-2022) ===
No. overall	No. in season	Title	Original release date	US viewers (millions)
181	1	"There is no me in polygamy"	November 21, 2021	1.57
182	2	"Four Wives, Three Fires"	November 28, 2021	1.49
183	3	"Not Social but Very Distant"	December 5, 2021	1.51
184	4	"Cistern Wives"	December 12, 2021	1.44
185	5	"Sad Sorry Lonely Little People"	December 19, 2021	1.53
186	6	"No Head Wife"	December 26, 2021	N/A
187	7	"Choosing Kids over Kody"	January 2, 2022	1.76
188	8	"Two Cliques"	January 9, 2022	1.81
189	9	"The Teflon Queen"	January 16, 2022	1.78
190	10	"The Beginning Of the End"	January 23, 2022	1.94

=== Season 17 (2022-2023) ===
No. overall	No. in season	Title	Original release date	US viewers (millions)
194	1	"It's Over"	September 11, 2022	N/A
195	2	"Is There a Favorite Wife?"	September 18, 2022	N/A
196	3	"The Labors of Life"	September 25, 2022	1.32
197	4	"And Then There Were Three"	October 2, 2022	1.57
198	5	"The Last Family Gathering"	October 9, 2022	1.51
199	6	"Telling Truly"	October 16, 2022	1.48
200	7	"The Failed Priest"	October 23, 2022	1.70
201	8	"Hang on With Me"	October 30, 2022	1.56
202	9	"A Polygamist Divorce"	November 6, 2022	1.68
203	10	"The Knife in the Kidneys"	November 13, 2022	1.71
204	11	"The Worst Goodbye"	November 20, 2022	1.80
205	12	"Life After Polygamy"	November 27, 2022	1.90
206	13	"Coronapocalypse"	December 4, 2022	N/A
207	14	"Which Wife Is Next?"	December 11, 2022	N/A

=== Season 18 (2023) ===
No. overall	No. in season	Title	Original release date	US viewers (millions)
211	1	"No Such Thing as a Free Lunch"	August 20, 2023	1.74
212	2	"Thanks for Nothing"	August 27, 2023	1.47
213	3	"Throwing Stones in Glass Houses"	September 3, 2023	1.42
214	4	"A Deal With the Devil"	September 10, 2023	1.46
215	5	"When the Going Gets Tough"	September 17, 2023	N/A
216	6	"The Understatement of the Year"	September 24, 2023	N/A
217	7	"Throwing in the Towel"	October 1, 2023	N/A
218	8	"The Writing Is on the Wall"	October 8, 2023	N/A
219	9	"Battle Lines Are Drawn"	October 15, 2023	N/A
220	10	"Don't Put All Your Eggs in One Basket"	October 22, 2023	N/A
221	11	"Airing the Dirty Laundry"	October 29, 2023	N/A
222	12	"Can't See the Forest for the Trees"	November 5, 2023	N/A
223	13	"The Elephant in the Room"	November 12, 2023	N/A
224	14	"It's Always Darkest Before Dawn"	November 19, 2023	N/A

=== Season 19 (2024–2025) ===
No. overall	No. in season	Title	Original release date	US viewers (millions)
225	1	"A House Divided Cannot Stand"	September 15, 2024	N/A
226	2	"Let There Be Light"	September 22, 2024	N/A
227	3	"Am I My Brothers Keeper?"	September 29, 2024	N/A
228	4	"How the Mighty Have Fallen"	October 6, 2024	N/A
229	5	"The Year of Release"	October 13, 2024	N/A
230	6	"He Delivered Me From All My Fears"	October 20, 2024	N/A
231	7	"Labor of Love"	October 27, 2024	N/A
232	8	"A Wolf in Sheep's Clothing"	November 3, 2024	N/A
233	9	"Baptism by Fire"	November 10, 2024	N/A
234	10	"A Man After My Own Heart"	November 17, 2024	N/A
235	11	"The Eleventh Hour"	November 24, 2024	N/A
236	12	"Put Your House in Order"	December 1, 2024	N/A
237	13	"Give Up the Ghost"	December 8, 2024	N/A
238	14	"The Truth Will Set You Free"	December 15, 2024	N/A
239	15	"Faith Can Move Mountains"	December 29, 2024	N/A
240	16	"A Time to Weep, a Time to Laugh"	January 5, 2025	N/A
241	17	"Love Is Patient, Love Is Kind"	January 12, 2025	N/A
242	18	"Money Is the Root of All Evil"	January 19, 2025	N/A
243	19	"Behold I Come Like a Thief"	January 26, 2025	N/A
244	20	"For Everything There is a Season"	February 2, 2025	N/A
245	21	"The Land of Milk and Honey?"	April 20, 2025	N/A
246	22	"Love Covers All Wrongs"	April 27, 2025	N/A
247	23	"The Stars Will Fall From the Sky"	May 4, 2025	N/A
248	24	"Blessed Are Those Who Mourn"	May 11, 2025	N/A
249	25	"He Heals the Brokenhearted"	May 18, 2025	N/A

=== Season 20 (2025–2026) ===
No. overall	No. in season	Title	Original release date	US viewers (millions)
250	1	"Why I Want To Be a Monogamist"	September 28, 2025	N/A
251	2	"Welcome to Speed Dating"	October 5, 2025	N/A
252	3	"All About Eggplants"	October 12, 2025	N/A
253	4	"You Need to Shut Up"	October 19, 2025	N/A
254	5	"Kissing Another Man's Wife"	October 26, 2025	N/A
255	6	"We're Not Brother Husbands"	November 2, 2025	N/A
256	7	"You're Like a Stripper, I'm Like the Pole"	November 9, 2025	N/A
257	8	"Making Out Like Teenagers"	November 16, 2025	N/A
258	9	"Standoff at Coyote Pass"	November 23, 2025	N/A
259	10	"Extending an Olive Branch"	November 30, 2025	N/A
260	11	"Leaving Las Vegas"	December 7, 2025	N/A
261	12	"What If We Worked This Out?"	December 14, 2025	N/A
262	13	"Benevolence, Bitch"	December 21, 2025	N/A
263	14	"You Are Toxic to Me"	December 28, 2025	N/A
264	15	"No Brain, No Pain"	January 4, 2026	N/A

=== Season 21 (2026) ===
No. overall	No. in season	Title	Original release date	US viewers (millions)
265	1	"Crazy Big News"	October 4, 2026	N/A
266	2	"Been There Done That"	October 11, 2026	N/A
267	3	"Falling Into Old Feels"	October 18, 2026	N/A
268	4	"The Pink Elephant in the Room"	October 25, 2026	TBD
269	5	"The Stench of a Failed Marriage"	November 1, 2026	TBD
270	6	"Therapy by Fire"	November 8, 2026	TBD
271	7	"What Did I Get Myself Into?"	November 15, 2026	TBD
272	8	"What Do You Wear on a Date?"	November 22, 2026	TBD
273	9	TBA	November 29, 2026	TBD

== Specials ==
No. overall	Featured season	Title	Original release date
8	1	"Sister Wives Special"	October 31, 2010
9	1	"Honeymoon Special"	November 21, 2010
32	3	"Sisters' Special Delivery"	November 27, 2011
44	4	"Tell All"	June 24, 2012
53	5	"Secrets Revealed"	December 30, 2012
64	6	"Tell All Season 6A"	September 22, 2013
73	6	"Tell All Season 6B"	February 23, 2014
82	7	"Tell All"	July 27, 2014
88	8	"Robyn: Behind the Scenes"	February 8, 2015
90	8	"Meri: Behind the Scenes"	February 15, 2015
92	8	"Tell All"	March 1, 2015
95	9	"All About Janelle"	September 20, 2015
97	9	"All About Christine"	September 27, 2015
105	9	"Tell All"	November 22, 2015
115	10	"Tell All"	June 26, 2016
126	11	"Tell All, Part 1"	January 22, 2017
127	11	"Tell All, Part 2"	January 29, 2017
139	12	"Tell All, Part 1"	March 25, 2018
140	12	"Tell All, Part 2"	April 1, 2018
141	12	"Polygamy 101"	April 1, 2018
153	13	"Tell All, Part 1"	April 14, 2019
154	13	"Tell All, Part 2"	April 21, 2019
191	16	"One on One, Part 1"	January 30, 2022
192	16	"One on One, Part 2"	February 6, 2022
193	16	"One on One, Part 3"	February 20, 2022
208	17	"One on One, Part 1"	December 18, 2022
209	17	"One on One, Part 2"	January 1, 2023
210	17	"One on One, Part 3"	January 8, 2023
225	18	"One on One, Part 1"	November 26, 2023
226	18	"One on One, Part 2"	December 3, 2023
227	18	"One on One, Part 3"	December 3, 2023
228	18	"One on One, Part 4"	December 17, 2023
229	18	"Talk Back, Part 1"	December 22, 2023
230	18	"Look Back: How It Started"	December 24, 2023
231	18	"Talk Back, Part 2"	December 29, 2023
232	18	"Look Back: How It's Going"	December 31, 2023
233	18	"Christine and David, Part 1"	January 7, 2024
234	18	"Christine and David, Part 2"	January 14, 2024

Timeline of Tell All (Note: Since Season 16, the specials previously known as Tell Alls have been called "One-on-Ones") Hosts:

Tell All Hosts
Host	Sister Wives Special	Season											Ref.
Host	Sister Wives Special	6	7	8	9	10	11	12	13	16	17	18	Ref.
Natalie Morales													
Tamron Hall													
Erica Hill													
Andrea Canning													
SuChin Pak													
Sukanya Krishnan													
