= One on One =

One on One may refer to:

== Arts and entertainment ==
=== Film ===
- One on One (1977 film), a 1977 movie starring Robby Benson and Annette O'Toole
  - One on One (soundtrack), the soundtrack album from the film
- One on One (2014 film), a 2014 South Korean film

=== Television ===
==== Episodes ====
- "One on One", Alice (American) season 9, episode 14 (1985)
- "One on One", Betas episode 4 (2013)
- "One on One", Beverly Hills, 90210 season 1, episode 5 (1990)
- "One on One", Brothers (1984) season 4, episode 17 (1987)
- "One on One", Hangin' with Mr. Cooper season 5, episode 7 (1997)
- "One on One", High Tide season 2, episode 4 (1995)
- "One-on-One", Joanie Loves Chachi season 2, episode 3 (1982)
- "One on One", Love, Inc. episode 9 (2005)
- "One on One", My Secret Identity season 1, episode 16 (1989)
- "One on One", Sky Commanders episode 6 (1987)
- "One on One", SilverHawks episode 26 (1986)
- "One on One", Sister Wives season 16, episodes 11–13 (2022)
- "One on One", Sister Wives season 17, episodes 15–17 (2022–2023)
- "One on One", Sister Wives season 18, episodes 15–17 (2023)
- "One on One", Sparks season 1, episode 9 (1996)
- "One on One", The Clash season 4, episode 2 (2021)
- "One-on-One", The Crossover episode 3 (2023)
- "One on One", Time Trax season 1, episode 22 (1993)
- "One on One", Wiseguy season 1, episode 6 (1987)

==== Series ====
- Mansbridge One on One, weekly TV program on CBC Television
- One on One (American TV series), a 2000s American sitcom
- One on One (Israeli TV series), a 2020 Israeli TV drama series
- One on One with John Tesh, a 1991-92 American daytime talk show hosted by John Tesh
- One on One with Steve Adubato, an American television talk show
- Riz Khan One on One, a former programme on Al Jazeera English

=== Music ===
==== Albums ====
- One on One, by Shelly Manne and Russ Freeman, Atlas 1982
- One on One (Bob James and Earl Klugh album)
- One on One (Cheap Trick album)
- One on One (Mira Calix album)
- One on One (Randy Owen album)
- One on One (Stéphane Grappelli and McCoy Tyner album)
- One on One (Steve Camp album)
- One on One (Yazz album)
- One on One (One Songwriter, One Instrument), a Spiritone Records compilation album including a song by Ralston Bowles
- 1 on 1 (Rupee album), Rupee album 2004

==== Songs ====
- "One on One" (song), a song by Hall & Oates

==== Concert ====
- One on One (tour), a 2016-2017 concert world tour by Paul McCartney

=== Other uses in arts and entertainment ===
- One on One (novel), a novel by Tabitha King
- One on One, an interview series on the SourceFed YouTube channel
- One on One: Dr. J vs. Larry Bird, a computer game
  - Jordan vs. Bird: One on One, a computer game and sequel to "One on One: Dr. J vs. Larry Bird"
- One on One, a game for PlayStation
- One on One with Igan, a Filipino radio show

== Other uses ==
- One-on-one (basketball), basketball game between two players

== See also ==
- One on one tackle, a play in rugby league football
- One-to-one (disambiguation)
- Personal (disambiguation)
- Professional wrestling match types#Variations of singles matches, often referred to as a one on one match
