= My Five Wives =

American reality television series

- Genre: Reality
- Starring: The Williams family
- Country of origin: United States
- Original language: English
- No. of seasons: 2
- No. of episodes: 21

Production
- Production locations: Salt Lake City, Utah
- Camera setup: Multiple
- Running time: 42 minutes

Original release
- Network: TLC
- Release: March 9 – December 21, 2014

My Five Wives is an American reality television series broadcast on TLC that began airing in 2013. The show documents the life of a polygamist family, which includes wife Paulie Caroline, her husband, their four other wives, and their 25 children. The family began the series living in an undisclosed city outside of Salt Lake City, Utah, due to fear of prosecution for polygamy. Towns shown in the show are Payson, Spanish Fork, and Provo. The five wives in order of marriage are: Paulie, Robyn, Rosemary, Nonie, and Rhonda.

== Cast ==
- Brady Frank Williams
- Paulie Caroline
- Robyn Florentine
- Rosemary Jennifer
- Ramona "Nonie" Darleen
- Rhonda Lee

== Episodes ==
=== Series overview ===
Season	Episodes	Originally released	
Season	Episodes	First released	Last released
1	10	March 9, 2014	May 11, 2014
2	10	October 19, 2014	December 21, 2014

=== Season 1 (2014) ===
No. overall	No. in series	Title	Original release date	U.S. viewers (millions)
1	1	"Stuck In The Middle With You..And You..And You..."	March 9, 2014	N/A
2	2	"Turkeys and Ticking Clocks"	March 16, 2014	N/A
3	3	"While Brady's Away, The Wives Will Play"	March 23, 2014	N/A
4	4	"Have Yourself A Merry Williams Christmas"	March 30, 2014	N/A
5	5	"The Birds And The Bees & Everything In-Between"	April 6, 2014	2.05
6	6	"Wanna Know A Secret?"	April 13, 2014	N/A
7	7	"We'll Be There For You"	April 20, 2014	N/A
8	8	"Love Is All We Need"	April 27, 2014	N/A
9	9	"You Asked, Brady And The Wives Answer"	May 4, 2014	N/A
10	10	"Tell All"	May 11, 2014	N/A

=== Season 2 (2014) ===
No. overall	No. in series	Title	Original release date	U.S. viewers (millions)
1	11	"Mending A Marriage"	October 19, 2014	N/A
2	12	"The Dating Lottery"	October 26, 2014	N/A
3	13	"An Extended Family RSVP"	November 2, 2014	N/A
4	14	"Bonds of Sisterhood"	November 9, 2014	N/A
5	15	"Williams Family Road Trip - Seattle or Bust!"	November 16, 2014	N/A
6	16	"Home Sweet Seattle?"	November 23, 2014	N/A
7	17	"Breaking Old Habits"	November 30, 2014	N/A
8	18	"How Much is Too Much?"	December 7, 2014	N/A
9	19	"What Happens in Vegas..."	December 14, 2014	N/A
10	20	"In the End, We're in this Together"	December 21, 2014	N/A

== See also ==
- Sister Wives, another American reality TV series on TLC about a polygamist family
- Seeking Sister Wife, another American reality TV series on TLC about polygamists
- Uthando Nes’thembu, a South African reality TV series on Mzansi Magic about a polygamist Zulu family
