= Bill Hayes (television producer) =

American television producer

Bill Hayes is an American television producer, and the Founder and CEO of Figure 8 Films and Thunder Mountain Media.

Hayes has been the Executive Producer for over 1,500 programs for the Discovery Networks and numerous other networks around the world. These shows include the hit series Sister Wives, 19 Kids and Counting, Salvage Dawgs, Jon & Kate Plus 8, and Bringing Up Bates. In 1992, he created The Operation series that revolutionized medical programming for cable. In 1997 he helped create and produced the Breed All About It series for Animal Planet. Hayes has also produced, directed and executive produced a long list of award-winning specials including the EMMY winning Unlocking Autism, Joined at Birth, Joined for Life, "No Arms Needed" and Miracle Man: John of God. He produced and directed the documentary films The Real Mayberry and Morgan Wootten: The Godfather of Basketball.

Hayes is a graduate of Duke University and has served as a lecturer and student adviser at Duke. He has also been an adjunct professor at the University of North Carolina School of Journalism. He has been on the Executive Board of CINE and Full Frame Film Festival. He has been a guest on William Friday’s North Carolina People show on North Carolina Public Television, interviewed by NPR, "The State of Things" and featured in Slate.com. His work has been written about in Variety, Vanity Fair, the New York Times, Washington Post, Newsweek and numerous other publications. His hometown is Mt. Airy, NC, the real Mayberry R.F.D.
