= Polygamy in Christianity =

Polygamy is "the practice or custom of having more than one wife or husband at the same time". Polygamy has been practiced by many cultures throughout history.

Although the Old Testament describes numerous examples of polygyny (one male, one wife with multiple concubines) among devotees to God, most Christian groups have historically rejected the practice of polygamy and have upheld monogamy alone as normative. Nevertheless, some Christian groups in different periods have practiced, or currently do practice, polygamy. Some Christians actively debate whether the New Testament or Christian ethics allows or forbids polygamy and there are several Christian views on the Old Covenant.

The practice primarily focuses on polygyny (one man having more than one wife) and not polyandry (one woman having more than one husband), as polyandry is implied to be unlawful by the Hebrew Bible's laws of adultery (e.g., Deuteronomy 22:22) and in the New Testament (e.g., Romans 7:3).

== Jewish background ==
The Torah contains a few specific regulations that apply to polygyny (a male with multiple wives), such as Exodus 21:10: "If he take another wife for himself; her food, her clothing, and her duty of marriage, shall he not diminish". Deut 21:15–17 states that a man must award the inheritance due to a first-born son to the son who was actually born first, even if he hates that son's mother and likes another wife more; and Deut 17:17 states that the king shall not have many wives.

The Torah may distinguish concubines and "sub-standard" wives with the prefix "to" (e.g., lit. "took to wives"). Despite these nuances to the biblical perspective on polygamy, many important figures had more than one wife, such as Esau (Gen 26:34; 28:6-9), Jacob (Gen 29:15-28), Elkanah (1 Samuel 1:1-8), David (1 Samuel 25:39-44; 2 Samuel 3:2-5; 5:13-16), and Solomon (1 Kings 11:1-3).

Despite its prevalence in the Hebrew Bible, some scholars do not believe that polygyny was commonly practiced in the biblical era because it required a significant amount of wealth. Michael Coogan (and others), in contrast, states that "Polygyny continued to be practiced well into the biblical period, and it is attested among Jews as late as the second century CE".

The monogamy of the Roman Empire was the cause of two explanatory notes in the writings of Josephus describing how the polygamous marriages of Herod the Great were permitted under Jewish custom.

Polygamy was a rare exception in post-exilic Israel. The practice began to be criticized and declined during the intertestamental period but there is some extant evidence of polygamy being practiced in the New Testament period. The Dead Sea Scrolls show that several smaller Jewish sects forbade polygamy before and during the time of Jesus. The Temple Scroll (11QT LVII 17–18) seems to prohibit polygamy for kings.

== New Testament ==
Three passages in the pastoral epistles (1 Timothy 3:2, 1 Timothy 3:12 and Titus 1:6) state that church leaders should be the "husband of one wife." This has been read by some Christian denominations as a prohibition of polygamy. Others argue that polygamy is allowed, but not for church leaders. Still others argue that the passage only prevents church leaders from divorcing their first wives. In his 1990 book Walter Lock argues that it simply prevents marital unfaithfulness since "no Christian, whether an overseer or not, would have been allowed to practice polygamy."

In 1 Corinthians Paul the Apostle states that a man is to have his own wife and a woman is to have her own husband.

Now concerning the matters about which you wrote: "It is good for a man not to have sexual relations with a woman." But because of the temptation to sexual immorality, each man should have his own wife and each woman her own husband. The husband should give to his wife her conjugal rights, and likewise the wife to her husband. For the wife does not have authority over her own body, but the husband does. Likewise the husband does not have authority over his own body, but the wife does. Do not deprive one another, except perhaps by agreement for a limited time, that you may devote yourselves to prayer; but then come together again, so that Satan may not tempt you because of your lack of self-control.

— 1 Corinthians 7:1–7

Matthew Henry comments on 1 Corinthians 7:

II. He informs them that marriage, and the comforts and satisfactions of that state, are by divine wisdom prescribed for preventing fornication (v. 2), Porneias—Fornications, all sorts of lawless lust. To avoid these, Let every man, says he, have his own wife, and every woman her own husband; that is, marry, and confine themselves to their own mates. And, when they are married, let each render the other due benevolence (v. 3), consider the disposition and exigency of each other, and render conjugal duty, which is owing to each other. For, as the apostle argues (v. 4), in the married state neither person has power over his own body, but has delivered it into the power of the other, the wife hers into the power of the husband, the husband his into the power of the wife. Note, Polygamy, or the marriage of more persons than one, as well as adultery, must be a breach of marriage-covenants, and a violation of the partner's rights. And therefore they should not defraud one another of the use of their bodies, nor any other of the comforts of the conjugal state, appointed of God for keeping the vessel in sanctification and honour, and preventing the lusts of uncleanness, except it be with mutual consent (v. 5) and for a time only, while they employ themselves in some extraordinary duties of religion, or give themselves to fasting and prayer. Note, Seasons of deep humiliation require abstinence from lawful pleasures. But this separation between husband and wife must not be for a continuance, lest they expose themselves to Satan's temptations, by reason of their incontinence, or inability to contain. Note, Persons expose themselves to great danger by attempting to perform what is above their strength, and at the same time not bound upon them by any law of God. If they abstain from lawful enjoyments, they may be ensnared into unlawful ones. The remedies God hath provided against sinful inclinations are certainly best.

— Matthew Henry Commentary on the Whole Bible

John Gill comments on 1 Corinthians 7 and states that polygamy is unlawful; and that one man is to have but one wife, and to keep to her; and that one woman is to have but one husband, and to keep to him and the wife only has a power over the husband's body, a right to it, and may claim the use of it: this power over each other's bodies is not such, as that they may, by consent, either the husband allow the wife, or the wife the husband, to lie with another.

Although the New Testament is largely silent on the issue, some point to Jesus' repetition of the earlier scriptures, noting that a man and a wife "shall become one flesh." (Genesis 2:24, Matthew 19:3–6) However, some look to 1 Corinthians 6:16: "Or do you not know that he who is joined to a prostitute becomes one body with her? For, as it is written, "The two will become one flesh."" Supporters of polygamy claim this indicates a physical, rather than spiritual, union.

Most Christian theologians argue that in Matthew 19:3–9 and referring to Genesis 2:24 Jesus explicitly states a man should have only one wife:

Have ye not read, that he which made them at the beginning made them male and female, And said, For this cause shall a man leave father and mother, and shall cleave to his wife: and they twain shall be one flesh?

Polygamists do not dispute that in marriage "two shall be one flesh"; they only disagree with the idea that a married man can only be "one flesh" with one woman. Assuming the man is married, the act of a man becoming "one flesh" with a harlot apparently does not negate his being "one flesh" with his wife. Further, if a man is married, he and his wife are "one flesh." To add another wife would mean that the new wife becomes "one flesh" with the man and his current wife. Gill argues that polygamists in disagreeing with the idea that a married man can only be "one flesh" with one woman are in fact disagreeing with Apostle Paul, who makes it clear that in the Christian Covenant the man who already has one wife can not add another wife because his body belongs to the one wife and is no longer his; if the man adds another wife, then that woman is coveting another woman's husband. In the Christian Covenant, a woman shalt not covet another woman's husband just like in the Mosaic covenant a man is shalt not covet another man's wife.

Many critics of polygamy also point to the Pauline epistles that state that church officials should be respectable, above reproach, and the husband of a single wife. (1 Timothy 3, Titus 1) hermeneutically, the Greek phrase mias gunaikos andra is an unusual Greek construction, capable of being translated in multiple ways, including (but not limited to): 1) "one wife man," (prohibiting plural marriage) or 2) "a wife man" (requiring elders to be married) or 3) "first wife man" (prohibiting divorcés from ordination).

In the time around Jesus' birth, polygamy (also called bigamy or digamy in texts) was understood as having several spouses consecutively, as evidenced for example by Tertullian's work De Exhortatione Castitatis. Paul the Apostle allowed widows to remarry (1 Cor. vii. 39. and 1 Tim 5:11–16). Paul says that only women older than 60 years can make the list of Christian widows, but that younger widows should remarry to hinder sin. Some conclude that by requiring leaders of the Church be monogamous, Paul excluded remarried widowers from having influence. Perpetual monogamy — even after the death of one's spouse — would have been a more strict understanding of monogamy than Roman law codified, and would have been a new and unusual demand on men.

On this subject William Luck writes:

Thus it is most probable that the qualifications list sees the "husband of one wife" as a condemnation of porneia—unlawful sex, though doubtless the clause also prohibited adultery—sex with someone else's wife, polygyny was out of sight and mind. The issue is not the number of covenant relations the man had—he would only have had one at a time, since the empire was monogamous—but his womanizing. This of course does not eliminate the grievous sin of marrying and divorcing in order to have sexual relations with a number of women. But that too is not the issue in polygyny.

== Early Church period ==
Jewish polygamy clashed with Roman monogamy at the time of the early church:

"When the Christian Church came into being, polygamy was still practiced by the Jews. It is true that we find no references to it in the New Testament; and from this some have inferred that it must have fallen into disuse, and that at the time of our Lord the Jewish people had become monogamous. But the conclusion appears to be unwarranted. Josephus in two places speaks of polygamy as a recognized institution: and Justin Martyr makes it a matter of reproach to Trypho that the Jewish teachers permitted a man to have several wives. Indeed when in 212 A.D. the lex Antoniana de civitate gave the rights of Roman Citizenship to great numbers of Jews, it was found necessary to tolerate polygamy among them, even though it was against Roman law for a citizen to have more than one wife. In 285 A.D. a constitution of Diocletian and Maximian interdicted polygamy to all subjects of the empire without exception. But with the Jews, at least, the enactment failed of its effect; and in 393 A.D. a special law was issued by Theodosius to compel the Jews to relinquish this national custom. Even so they were not induced to conform."

Tertullian, who lived at the turn of the 2nd and 3rd centuries, wrote that marriage is lawful, but polygamy is not:

"We do not indeed forbid the union of man and woman, blest by God as the seminary of the human race, and devised for the replenishment of the earth and the furnishing of the world and therefore permitted, yet singly. For Adam was the one husband of Eve, and Eve his one wife, one woman, one rib."

Augustine wrote in the second half of the 4th century:

"That the good purpose of marriage, however, is better promoted by one husband with one wife, than by a husband with several wives, is shown plainly enough by the very first union of a married pair, which was made by the Divine Being Himself."

The 3rd century Eusebius of Caesarea wrote the lost work "On the Numerous Progeny of the Ancients". Eusebius references this twice, in the Præparatio Evangelica, and in the Demonstratio Evangelica. Although his work has been given as an example of plural marriage being reconciled with the ascetic life, the problem dealt with was the contrast presented by the desire of the Patriarchs for numerous offspring and the honour in which continence was held by Christians.

Augustine tackled this objection by arguing that polygamy, for the sake of the populating of the earth, "was to holy men at that time a matter of duty not of lust." Defending the continence of the Patriarchs while condemning Polygamy among Christians. Tertullian likewise tackled the objection that Patriarchs were unrighteous in Polygamy. He wrote, "each pronouncement and arrangement is (the act) of one and the same God; who did then indeed, in the beginning, send forth a sowing of the race by an indulgent laxity granted to the reins of connubial alliances, until the world should be replenished, until the material of the new discipline should attain to forwardness: now, however, at the extreme boundaries of the times, has checked (the command) which He had sent out, and recalled the indulgence which He had granted". (De Monogamia chapt. VI.) According to chapter XVI of De Monogamia, Hermogenes thought it was allowed for a man to take several wives. Tertullian also made a direct attack on the polygamous practice of some cults in his work Adversus Hermogenem. This is the same Hermogenes mentioned above. Tertullian writes that he was a sect leader, who mixed Stoic, Gnostic and Christian views to create a new religion.

Socrates of Constantinople wrote in the 5th century that the Roman Emperor Valentinian I took two wives and authorized his subjects to take two wives, supporting that Christians were then practicing plural marriage. There is no trace of such an edict in any of the extant Roman Laws. Valentinian I divorced his first wife according to John Malalas, the Chronicon Paschale and John of Nikiu, before marrying his mistress, which was viewed as bigamy by Socrates, since the Church did not accept divorce.

== Middle Ages ==
The Church held a synod in Hertford, England, in 673 that was supervised by Archbishop Theodore. Chapter 10 issued by the synod declared that marriage is allowed between one man and one woman, and separation (but not divorce) is only granted in the case of adultery, but even then remarriage is not allowed.

In the medieval period, multiple wives were often obtained through kidnapping. It is with this in view that we must interpret the following laws: The Frankish Laws of 818–9 strictly forbade kidnapping of women. The XXVII. law issued by King Stephen I of Hungary (1000–1030) declares that the kidnapper must return the woman to her parents even if he has had sexual intercourse with her, and must pay a penalty to the parents. According to the Hungarian law, the kidnapped girl was then free to marry anyone.

The Roman councils of 1052 and 1063 suspended from communion those laymen who had a wife and a concubine at the same time. Divorce was also forbidden, and remarriage after a divorce counted as polygamy. Nicholas the Great (858–67) forbade Lothair II of Lotharingia to divorce his barren wife Teutberga and marry his concubine Waldrada, with whom he had several children. After a council of the Lotharingian bishops, as well as the archbishop of Köln and Trier, had annulled his marriage to Theutberga, the Pope voided this decision, and made him take his wife back.

In Scandinavia, the word for an official concubine was "frille". Norwegian Bishop Øystein Erlendsson (ca. 1120–1188) declared that concubines were not allowed to accept the sacraments unless they married, and men were forced to promise marriage to women they had lain with outside of wedlock. In 1280, the Norwegian king Eirik Magnusson (1280–99) declared that men were exempted from having to promise marriage to the frille if they went to confession and did penance. The Church answered by making several declarations in the 14th century, urging men to marry their concubines. In 1305, King Håkon V (1270–1319) issued a law that declared marriage to be the only lawful way of cohabitation, and declared that only women in wedlock were allowed to dress as they pleased, while the dress of concubines was restricted.

== Reformation period ==
Monogamy was the norm among Christians. However, in the context of the sickness of a wife preventing matrimonial intercourse, Martin Luther, the founder of the Protestant Reformation, wrote: "I confess that I cannot forbid a person to marry several wives, for it does not contradict the Scripture. If a man wishes to marry more than one wife he should be asked whether he is satisfied in his conscience that he may do so in accordance with the word of God. In such a case the civil authority has nothing to do in the matter." However sources also show Martin Luther strictly forbidding polygamy on biblical grounds as Christians were no longer under the Mosaic law. Arthur Cushman McGiffert also states,

"Some of the radical Anabaptists undertook to introduce polygamy, appealing to the patriarchal order of society in justification of their position. Even among Luther's followers and associates there was no little uncertainty about the matter, as was not altogether surprising when the old order of things was undergoing revision at so many points, including the marriage of monks, priests, and near relatives. But Luther himself was unalterably opposed to any such revolution. Monogamy he considered, under ordinary circumstances, alone tolerable in a Christian community, and held that no Christian ruler has any moral right to legalize polygamy. At the same time, finding no explicit prohibition in the Bible, he believed exceptions might be allowed in certain extreme cases such as are now generally recognized in Protestant countries as justifying divorce."

Some Lutheran theologians approved of Philip of Hesse's polygamous marriages to Christine of Saxony and Margarethe von der Saale for this purpose, as well as initial disapproval of divorce and adultery. Apart from Philip, there was much experimentation with marital duration within early German Lutheranism amongst clergy and their erstwhile wives. The theologian Philipp Melanchthon likewise counseled that Henry VIII need not risk schism by dissolving his union with the established churches to grant himself divorces in order to replace his barren wives, but reluctantly, and with remorse afterward, consented that polygamy was an allowable alternative.

Anabaptist leader Bernhard Rothmann initially opposed the idea of plural marriage. However, he later wrote a theological defense of plural marriage, and took nine wives himself, saying "God has restored the true practice of holy matrimony amongst us." Franz von Waldeck and the other enemies of Anabaptist leader John of Leiden accused him of keeping 16 wives, and publicly beheading one when she disobeyed him. This was used as the basis for their conquest of Münster in 1535.

The 16th-century Italian Capuchin friar, Bernardino Ochino, 77 years old and never married, wrote the "Thirty Dialogues", wherein Dialog XXI was considered a defense of plural marriage. Evidently, he borrowed some of his strongest arguments from a Lutheran dialogue written in 1541 in favor of plural marriage which was written under the fictitious name Huldericus Necobulus in the interest of justifying Philip of Hesse.

A different position was taken by the Council of Trent in 1563, which was opposed to polygyny and concubinage: "If anyone says that it is lawful for Christians to have several wives at the same time, and that it is not forbidden by any divine law (Matt. 19:4f): let him be anathema". The polemicist John Milton expressed support for polygamy in his De doctrina christiana.

The Lutheran pastor Johann Lyser strongly defended plural marriage in a work entitled "Polygamia Triumphatrix". As a result, he was imprisoned, beaten and exiled from Italy to the Netherlands. His book was burned by the public executioner. He never married nor desired wedlock. Samuel Friedrich Willenberg, a doctor of law at the University of Cracow, wrote the pro-plural marriage book De finibus polygamiae licitae. In 1715, his book was ordered to be burned. Friedrich escaped with his life, but was fined one hundred thousand gold pieces.

One of the more notable published works regarding the modern concept of Christian plural marriage dates from the 18th century. The book Thelyphthora was written by Martin Madan, a significant writer of hymns and a contemporary of John Wesley and Charles Wesley. Although Madan was an adherent only of polygyny in a Christian context, this particular volume set the foundation of what is considered the modern Christian plural marriage movement.

== Modern period ==
=== Catholic Church ===
The Council of Trent of 1545 to 1563 explicitly condemned polygamy: "If any one saith, that it is lawful for Christians to have several wives at the same time, and that this is not prohibited by any divine law; let him be anathema."

The Catechism of the Catholic Church forbids polygamy as a grave offense against the institution of marriage, and contrary to the original plan of God and equal dignity of human beings. However, there is debate about the actions of Catholic clergy after the end of the Thirty Years War. Numerous authors have noted that certain Franconian Catholic clergy, including two Archbishops, had approved of it in the short term to repopulate the region due to the shortage of men, despite earlier Catholic rulings.

Nevertheless, in parts of Africa such as Kenya, many Catholics (including catechists) have more than one wife, although participants are usually not vocal about the cultural practice due to its conflict with Church teaching.

=== Lutheran Church ===
Martin Luther deplored divorce (only permitting it in the cases of adultery and the Pauline privilege) but what he taught about polygamy differs in sources: one source says he taught it was allowed in Scripture, citing positive examples of it from the biblical patriarchs and that as such in he is alleged to have in 1521 granted the approval for a man to take a second wife, and again in 1539 for Philip I, Landgrave of Hesse to take a second wife. Another source says Luther strictly forbade polygamy, noting that the Mosaic law could not be applied to modern Christians. Sources also show Luther condemning Philip I’s behaviour, and according to Martin Luther, Philip lived "constantly in a state of adultery and fornication."

In the 1970s, the Lutheran World Federation hosted a regional conference in Africa, in which the acceptance of polygamists and their wives into full membership by the Lutheran Church in Liberia was defended as being permissible. While the Lutheran Church in Liberia permits men to retain their wives if they married them prior to being received into the Church, it does not permit polygamists who have become Christians to marry more wives after they have received the sacrament of Holy Baptism. Evangelical Lutheran missionaries among the Maasai people also tolerate the practice of polygamy; and in Southern Sudan, some polygamists are becoming Lutheran Christians.

=== Anglican Communion ===
Polygamy was first discussed during the Lambeth Conference of 1888:

"That it is the opinion of this Conference that persons living in polygamy be not admitted to baptism, but they may be accepted as candidates and kept under Christian instruction until such time as they shall be in a position to accept the law of Christ. That the wives of polygamists may, in the opinion of this Conference, be admitted in some cases to baptism, but that it must be left to the local authorities of the Church to decide under what circumstances they may be baptized." (Resolution 5).

A resolution dated 1958 and numbered 120 states that:

"(a) The Conference bears witness to the truth that monogamy is the divine will, testified by the teaching of Christ himself, and therefore true for every race of men,"

but adds:

"(d) The Conference, recognising that the problem of polygamy is bound up with the limitations of opportunities for women in society, urges that the Church should make every effort to advance the status of women in every possible way, especially in the sphere of education."

The Twelfth Lambeth Conference held in 1988, in Resolution 26 – Church and Polygamy stated:

This Conference upholds monogamy as God's plan, and as the ideal relationship of love between husband and wife; nevertheless recommends that a polygamist who responds to the Gospel and wishes to join the Anglican Church may be baptized and confirmed with his believing wives and children on the following conditions:

1. that the polygamist shall promise not to marry again as long as any of his wives at the time of his conversion are alive;
2. that the receiving of such a polygamist has the consent of the local Anglican community;
3. that such a polygamist shall not be compelled to put away any of his wives, on account of the social deprivation they would suffer;

In 2008 the Lambeth Conference noted:

"In the case of polygamy, there is a universal standard – it is understood to be a sin, therefore polygamists are not admitted to positions of leadership including Holy Orders, nor after acceptance of the Gospel can a convert take another wife, nor, in some areas, are they admitted to Holy Communion."

=== Church of Jesus Christ of Latter-day Saints ===
Polygamy (which was called "plural marriage" by Latter-day Saints in the 19th century or "the Principle" as it is called by modern fundamentalist practitioners) was taught by leaders of the Church of Jesus Christ of Latter-day Saints (LDS Church) and publicly practiced from 1852 to 1890, nevertheless, it was not the norm but the exception, even during this period. On September 24, 1890, Wilford Woodruff, the president of The Church of Jesus Christ of Latter-day Saints at that time, issued the 1890 Manifesto, which advised church members against entering into any marriage prohibited by the law of the land, and made it possible for Utah to become a U.S. state. Nevertheless, even after the Manifesto, the church quietly continued to perform a small number of plural marriages in the United States, Mexico, and Canada, (Note: The ledger of 'marriages and sealings performed outside the temple,' which is not comprehensive, lists 315 marriages which were performed between October 17, 1890, and September 8, 1903.36 Of the 315 marriages which are recorded in the ledger, research indicates that 25 of them (7.9%) were plural marriages and 290 of them were monogamous marriages (92.1%). Almost all of the monogamous marriages which are recorded were performed in Arizona or Mexico. Of the 25 plural marriages which are recorded, 18 were performed in Mexico, 3 were performed in Arizona, 2 were performed in Utah, 1 was performed in Colorado and 1 was performed on a boat on the Pacific Ocean.) thus a Second Manifesto was released during U.S. congressional hearings which were held in 1904. Although neither Manifesto dissolved existing plural marriages, plural marriage in the LDS Church gradually died by attrition during the early 1900s. The Manifesto was canonized in the LDS Church standard works as Official Declaration 1 and mainstream Mormons believe it was prompted by a divine revelation in which Woodruff was shown that the church would be thrown into turmoil if they did not comply with it. Mormon fundamentalists dispute the claim that Woodruff received any such revelation and as a result, they continue to practice plural marriage; these denominations include the Apostolic United Brethren and Fundamentalist Church of Jesus Christ of Latter-Day Saints, among others. In 2006, teenagers belonging to fundamentalist Mormon families demonstrated at a pro-plural marriage rally in Salt Lake City in 2006; over 200 supporters attended the event.

=== Other views ===
William Luck states that polygyny is not prohibited by the Bible and it would have been required if a married man seduced (Ex. 22) or raped (Deut. 22) a virgin, as long as her father did not veto the marriage.

However, in a book-length consideration of the problem, William George Blum argues that monogamy was always God's ideal. He points out that in every Old Testament example where polygynous families are described in any detail, family strife which involves the plural wives is also described. He argues that the concept of two becoming one flesh makes polygamy a violation of God's plan for marriage.

On August 29, 2017, the Council on Biblical Manhood and Womanhood released a manifesto on human sexuality which is known as the "Nashville Statement". The statement was signed by 150 evangelical leaders, and it includes 14 points of belief. Among other things, it states, "We deny that God has designed marriage to be a homosexual, polygamous, or polyamorous relationship."

However, a group identifying as Evangelical Christians claim an estimated 50,000 of their group practice Christian polygamy in the West, based on their belief that the Bible glorifies this form of marriage, which they justify by citing the fact that many biblical prophets had multiple wives, including David, Abraham, Jacob and Solomon. Individual evangelical Christian pastors have married more than one woman throughout Christendom. The Presbyterian missionary Harold Turner acknowledged the fact that the practice of polygamy was a cultural norm in some parts of the world, such as Africa, and based on it, he cautioned Western Christian missionaries not to impose the foreign cultural norm of monogamy on the Christians of Africa because doing so would lead to the sin of divorce, leaving children without both of their parents, and leading divorced wives to remarry.

What have we done to the Africans in the name of Christianity? Polygamy which Christ does not forbid, we have fought against as the greatest of all evils, but divorce and remarriage which he does forbid, we have introduced. We have truly managed to Europeanize them. Mission theory should teach us to preach the gospel but not our own national traditions.

— Harold Turner, Presbyterian missionary

Indeed, in many cultures, there is the possibility that the image of Christianity can be marred when a cleric in a Christian denomination which opposes polygamy "suggests that these wives may marry others, while the community regards them as still married to the first man"; in these cases, the Church can be seen as "a promoter of immorality and a destroyer of home and family" and become a stumbling block to nonbelievers. The Rev. Vincent Mulwa of Christ Pilgrim Restoration Centre opines that polygamy is a biblical practice, because it was the standard for various biblical prophets, and opposition to having more than one wife stems from Westerners imposing their views on Christians who belong to other cultures.

=== Exceptions in Africa ===
- John Colenso, the Anglican bishop of Natal, South Africa in 1853, was the first to write down the Zulu language. He championed the Zulu way of life, including plural marriage.
- In Liberia, the Lutheran Church began allowing plural marriage in the 1970s.
- The African instituted Harrist Church, started in 1913, permits those who are already living in polygamous marriages to convert and join it without having to renounce their multiple marriages.
  - The Celestial Church of Christ, another African initiated church, permits polygamy.
- Mswati III, the Christian king of Eswatini, has 15 wives.

== See also ==
- Alamo Christian Foundation
- Branch Davidians
- Christian views on marriage
- David Koresh
- Lalpa Kohhran Thar
- Legal status of polygamy
- Münster Rebellion
- Oneida Community
- Polyamory
- Polygamy in North America
- Polygyny in Islam
