= Sister Wives =

American reality television series

- Genre: Reality
- Created by: Tim Gibbons; Christopher Poole
- Starring: The Brown family
- Country of origin: United States
- Original language: English
- No. of seasons: 21
- No. of episodes: 271 (list of episodes)

Production
- Executive producers: Timothy Gibbons; Bill Hayes; Christopher Poole; Kirk Streb
- Producer: Vince Russo
- Production locations: Lehi, Utah; Las Vegas, Nevada; Flagstaff, Arizona
- Camera setup: Multi-camera
- Running time: 42 minutes
- Production companies: Figure 8 Films; Puddle Monkey Productions; Peacock Productions

Original release
- Network: TLC
- Release: September 26, 2010 – present

Sister Wives is an American reality television series broadcast on TLC that premiered on September 26, 2010. The show documented the life of a polygamist family affiliated with the Apostolic United Brethren, a fundamentalist Mormon sect. The family included Kody Brown, his current wife Robyn (née Sullivan), and his former wives Meri (née Barber), Janelle (née Schriever) , and Christine (née Allred), and their 18 children (1 by Meri, 6 each by Janelle and Christine, and Robyn's 5 children, 3 of whom were with her ex-husband). The family began the series living in Lehi, Utah, moved to Las Vegas in 2011, and to Flagstaff, Arizona, in 2018.

The Browns have stated they participated in the show to make the public aware of polygamist families and to combat societal prejudices. When the show began, Kody Brown argued that his polygamist arrangement was legal because he was legally married to only one woman, while the three other marriages in were "spiritual unions" without government recognition.

By 2025, Robyn was the only woman still in a relationship with Kody.

== Background ==
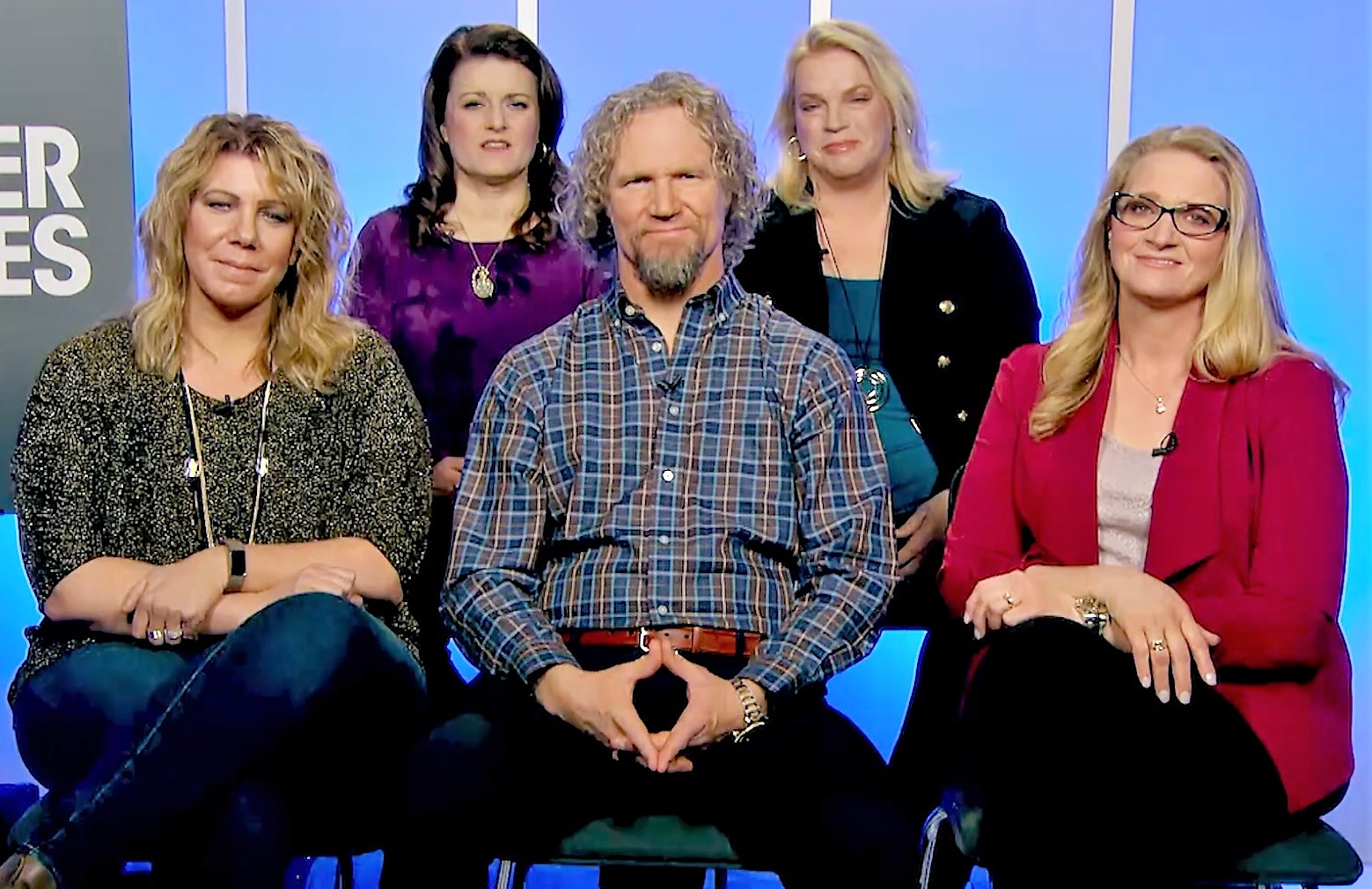
The Sister Wives cast interviewed on the Valder Beebe Show in 2019. Front row (from left to right): Meri, Kody, and Christine. Back row: Robyn and Janelle.

In the first episode, the show introduced Kody Brown and his wives Meri, Janelle, Christine and their 13 children. The four adults created the family in the early 1990s, as Kody and Meri were a married couple for three years before Janelle married Kody and soon after, Christine married Kody. The family began having children in 1994. Subsequently in the first season, the show televised Kody's courtship and marriage to his fourth wife, Robyn. Robyn was the first new wife to enter the family in 16 years and brought three children from her first marriage. During the same time period as the courtship and wedding, third wife Christine gave birth to Brown baby #13.

Sister Wives was publicly introduced on August 6, 2010, at the Television Critics Association summer media tour in Beverly Hills. The series' first episode, an hour-long, was broadcast on TLC on September 26, 2010, and the first season continued with six half-hour episodes until October 17, 2010.

The broadcast of Sister Wives came at a time when polygamy and multiple marriages were prevalent topics in American pop culture. Big Love, the hit HBO series about fictional Utah polygamist Bill Henrickson, his three sister wives, and their struggle to gain acceptance in society, had already been on the air for several years. In early September 2010, the drama series Lone Star, about a con man on the verge of entering into multiple marriages, premiered on Fox but was quickly canceled after two episodes. When Sister Wives debuted, actress Katherine Heigl was in the process of developing a film about Carolyn Jessop, a woman who fled from a polygamist sect.

In October 2010, TLC announced it had commissioned a second season, which began in March 2011. A TLC interview with the Brown family was broadcast on October 31, 2010, and a one-hour program featuring the honeymoon of Kody and Robyn aired on November 22, 2010.

The series led to the Brown family being investigated for possible prosecution. The family later sued the state of Utah, challenging its criminal polygamy laws. The Browns prevailed in the district court in a 2013 ruling, represented by law professor Jonathan Turley. But in 2016, a unanimous three-judge panel of the U.S. Court of Appeals for the Tenth Circuit ordered the case to be dismissed on standing grounds, as Utah had policy of not prosecuting polygamy per se involving consenting adults in the absence of other crimes so the Browns had no reasonable fear of legal action.

== Episodes ==
Season	Episodes		Originally released	
Season	Episodes		First released	Last released
1	7		September 26, 2010	November 21, 2010
2	11		March 13, 2011	June 5, 2011
3	11		September 25, 2011	November 27, 2011
4	11		May 13, 2012	June 24, 2012
5	8		November 18, 2012	December 30, 2012
6	18	10	July 21, 2013	September 22, 2013
6	18	8	December 29, 2013	June 26, 2014
7	8		June 8, 2014	July 27, 2014
8	7		January 4, 2015	March 1, 2015
9	10		September 13, 2015	November 22, 2015
10	9		March 13, 2016	June 5, 2016
11	10		November 27, 2016	January 29, 2017
12	11		January 7, 2018	April 1, 2018
13	11		January 20, 2019	April 21, 2019
14	15		January 5, 2020	April 12, 2020
15	11		March 13, 2021	June 5, 2021
16	10		November 21, 2021	February 20, 2022
17	14		September 11, 2022	January 8, 2023
18	14		August 20, 2023	December 19, 2023
19	25		September 15, 2024	May 18, 2025
20	15		September 28, 2025	January 4, 2026
21	TBA		October 4, 2026	2026

== Reception ==
=== Critical reception ===
Considering its sensational subject matter, TLC's Sister Wives has been refreshingly modest. The stars [have] a natural, honest presence in a genre fabled for the camera-hogging antics of Jersey Shore. Rather than merely emphasizing what's different about the Brown family – most obviously, their "plural marriage" – Sister Wives shows us how normal they seem: loving and good-natured around their children, occasionally prone to envy and feelings of betrayal.

— Schuyler Velasco, Salon

Sister Wives drew national media attention after its first season and garnered generally mixed reviews from critics. Washington Post staff writer Hank Stuever called it "refreshingly frank" and found most interesting the small details of the family's everyday life, such as the food supply, division of labor, and minor arguments. Los Angeles Times television critic Mary McNamara said she was intrigued by the matriarchal nature of the polygamist family, a unit that is traditionally considered patriarchal. McNamara said the wives form the center of the family and that "their bonds appear far stronger and more vital than the casual fondness with which they all treat Kody". Salon writer Schuyler Velasco praised Sister Wives for introducing viewers to the unfamiliar subject matter and called it "refreshingly modest" considering its controversial topic. Velasco said it has "a natural, honest presence in a genre fabled for the camera-hogging antics of Jersey Shore". Shelley Fralic of The Vancouver Sun called it fascinating and surprising and was impressed with the sensible and articulate way in which the family defended their lifestyle. When the Brown family made an October 2010 appearance on The Oprah Winfrey Show, talk show host Oprah Winfrey said she found particularly fascinating the relationship between the sister wives.

Mark A. Perigard of the Boston Herald criticized Kody Brown for opening himself and his family up to potential criminal prosecution by appearing in the series, describing him as "a lawbreaker who is risking himself and the family he claims is so precious just to star in his own TV show". Elizabeth Tenety of The Washington Post called the series "one part domestic drudgery, another part sensationalism" and claimed it relied on a "familiar reality TV recipe" shared by other TLC series such as 19 Kids and Counting and Kate Plus 8. Religion Dispatches writer Joanna Brooks shared Tenety's perspective, criticizing the show for presenting polygamy in a manner that "is about as interesting to me as Kate Gosselin's latest makeover." In this vein Brooks criticized the show for not engaging the theology of plural marriage and for letting Kody Brown's superficial comments about the dissimilarity of Fundamentalist and mainstream Mormonism pass on to the viewers without any critical scrutiny or added nuance. Shari Puterman, television columnist with the Asbury Park Press, felt the sister wives had issues with jealousy and self-worth, and she compared Kody to a cult leader. Puterman added, "I can't speak for everyone, but I believe in the sanctity of marriage. It's sad to see that TLC's capitalizing on people who don't." Former prosecutor and television personality Nancy Grace criticized the show and said she believed Kody Brown should go to jail, but she expressed doubt he would, based on Utah's history of overlooking polygamy. Christine Seifert, an associate professor of communications at Westminster College in Salt Lake City, said the show could give viewers who are unfamiliar with the LDS church the incorrect assumption that polygamy is accepted by the mainstream church. Several commentators have taken notice of the fact that the family's religious convictions are downplayed in Sister Wives.

=== Ratings ===
According to Nielsen Media Research, the September 26, 2010, one-hour premiere episode of Sister Wives drew 2.26 million viewers, a strong rating for the network. It marked the biggest series debut for TLC since Cake Boss launched in 2009 and was a stronger rating than any of the season premieres for HBO's Big Love. The remaining episodes of the first season were each half an hour long, with two broadcasts together each Thursday. In the second week, the first episode drew 1.88 million viewers, while the second drew 2.13 million. The third week drew similar results, with 1.89 million viewers watching the first episode and 2.05 million watching the second. Sister Wives drew its strongest ratings during the fourth and final week of the first season, with 2.67 million viewers for the first episode and 2.74 million for the season finale. As a result of the 2.7 million average viewership for the two episodes, TLC ranked first among all ad-support cable channels in the 18–49 and 25–54 age groups. The series drew double- and triple-digit rating gains in all key demographics and ranked second in ad-supported cable network shows during its timeslot.

== Litigation ==
Kody Brown, along with his wives, filed a legal case in the United States federal courts challenging the State of Utah's criminal polygamy law. The Browns prevailed in a 2013 federal district court ruling, but a unanimous three-judge panel of the U.S. Court of Appeals for the Tenth Circuit ordered the case to be dismissed on standing grounds in 2016. The Tenth Circuit concluded that, because local Utah prosecutors had a policy of not pursuing most polygamy cases in the absence of additional associated crimes (e.g., welfare fraud or marriage of underage persons), the Browns had no credible fear of future prosecution and thus lacked standing.

== Dissolution of relationships ==
As polygamous marriage is not legally recognized in the United States, there are no divorce documents to date the end of relationships. The end of a relationship is instead reckoned by announcements and events such as moving away.

In November 2021, Christine announced the dissolution of her relationship with Kody. Christine sold her Flagstaff home in October 2021, and in August 2022 transferred ownership of a portion of jointly owned "Coyote Pass" property in Flagstaff to Kody and Robyn Brown. On Valentine's Day 2023, Christine publicly announced her relationship with new boyfriend David Woolley. They announced their engagement on April 13. They married in October 2023.

In December 2022, Janelle announced her separation from Kody.

Meri's marriage was known to be the rockiest of all, and has been since the beginning of the show. It had been previously called a "non-sexual relationship" rather than a usual marriage. Following Christine and Janelle's divorces, rumors began that Meri was next. On January 10, 2023, Meri and Kody posted joint social media announcements that they decided to end their marriage. Meri also condemned a December 2022 article in People Magazine for incorrectly quoting her saying it was over before it was.

Meri (m. 1990–2023)
Janelle (m. 1993–2022)
Christine (m. 1994–2021)
Robyn (m. 2010–present)
│
1990
│
1995
│
2000
│
2005
│
2010
│
2015
│
2020
│
2025
Kody Brown's marriages

== Associated works ==
=== Becoming Sister Wives ===
In 2013, the parents jointly published a book titled Becoming Sister Wives: The Story of an Unconventional Marriage (ISBN 9781451661309).

=== Cooking with Just Christine ===
Following Christine's divorce, TLC gave her a YouTube show of her own titled Cooking with Just Christine.

=== Sister Wife: A Memoir of Faith, Family, and Finding Freedom ===
In 2025, Christine published her memoir over her life experiences before, during, and after the show.

== See also ==
- Escaping Polygamy (TV series), a reality TV series
- My Five Wives, a reality TV series
- Polygamy in North America
- Seeking Sister Wife, a reality TV series
- Uthando Nes’thembu, a South African reality TV series

== Bibliography ==
- Tenety, Elizabeth (August 10, 2011), "Warren Jeffs, 'Sister Wives,' and American polygamy", Washington Post (Blog), archived from the original on August 12, 2011
- Brown, Kody; Brown, Meri; Brown, Janelle; Brown, Christine; Brown, Robyn (April 16, 2013). Becoming Sister Wives. Gallery Books. ISBN 9781451661309 – via Internet Archive.
