= Polyamory: Married & Dating =

American reality television series

- Genre: Documentary; Reality
- Created by: Natalia Garcia
- Written by: Natalia Garcia
- Directed by: Natalia Garcia
- Opening theme: Andy Blunda
- Country of origin: United States
- Original language: English
- No. of seasons: 2
- No. of episodes: 15

Production
- Executive producers: Eugene Stein, Gail Berman, Lloyd Braun, Natalia Garcia
- Production locations: California, United States
- Cinematography: Terrence Hayes
- Running time: 30 minutes
- Production company: BermanBraun

Original release
- Network: Showtime
- Release: July 12, 2012 – October 3, 2013

Polyamory: Married & Dating is an American reality television series on the American pay television network Showtime. The series follows polyamorous families as they navigate the challenges presented by polyamory. Polyamory Season 1 debuted on July 12, 2012, Season 2 premiered on August 15, 2013.

== Cast ==
- Kamala Devi McClure (season 1—2)
- Jennifer Gold (season 1—2)
- Tahl Gruer (season 1—2)
- Michael McClure (season 1—2)
- Megan (season 2)
- Vanessa Carlisle (season 1)
- Anthony Cristofani (season 1)
- Lindsey Kate Cristofani (season 1)

Lindsey and Anthony are legally married to each other and are both in a relationship with Vanessa. These three are a primary relationship and refer to themselves as "the Triad". Kamala and Michael are legally married to each other, as are Jen and Tahl. The four of them refer to themselves as "the Pod".

Season 2 premiered on August 15. The pod of Kamala, Michael, Jen and Tahl is back with another new family.

== Episodes ==
=== Season 1 ===
No.	Title	Original air date	Synopsis
1	"The Poly Life"	July 12, 2012	Anthony and Vanessa are concerned that Lindsey's new relationship with Krystof is interfering with the Triad. Kamala and Michael ask their lovers Tahl and Jennifer to move in and they accept.
2	"Poly Rules"	July 19, 2012	Distrust of Lindsey leads Anthony and Vanessa to crash a lunch between Vanessa and Krystof to talk about the rules of the triad. The Pod formulates relationship rules but Kamala's outside girlfriend Roxanne leads Michael to question whether that relationship is poly.
3	"Poly Lovers"	July 26, 2012	Jen's monogamous sister drops by to check out Jen's new digs while Kamala has her hot date with Roxanne and hesitantly inquires about the true level of attraction between Roxanne and Michael. Anthony encourages his wife Lindsey to find a local boyfriend so Lindsey thinks about reconnecting with an ex-lover Jacob, but is he polyamorous?
4	"Poly Anniversary"	August 2, 2012	It's anniversary time for both families! Vanessa plans to propose to Lindsey and Anthony and ask for a life commitment and see what her true place is in the triad. Kamala celebrates 10 years of marriage with Michael with a private date and gives him a very special gift that pushes her own boundaries of possessiveness and jealousy.
5	"Poly Potluck"	August 9, 2012	The San Diego pod are having a poly potluck as an unofficial housewarming for Jen and Tahl moving in but Jen has issues with some of the people Kamala and Tahl want to invite. Anthony gets an invite to the poly potluck through one of the poly groups he's a member of and convinces Lindsey and Vanessa to check it out, so the Triad heads down to San Diego.
6	"Radical Honesty"	August 16, 2012	Anthony's parents are selling their childhood home so the Triad takes a trip up north to visit the home one last time and take this opportunity for Lindsey to come out to her mom about being polyamorous. The Pod is having a great time on the beach as a family unit which makes Tahl realize how happy he is, and decides he wants to come out to his very conservative parents. Jen disapproves but ultimately, it's Tahl's decision.
7	"We Are One"	August 23, 2012	In the season finale, San Diego is put to the test when one of Jen's major boundaries is broken - will she and Tahl move out? Meanwhile, the triad contemplates what's next for them and what it means in the eyes of their community and the world.

=== Season 2 ===
No.	Title	Original air date	Synopsis
1	"A New Chapter"	August 15, 2013	New family unit Chris, Leigh Ann and Megan are introduced. Leigh Ann's business commitments lead her to spend more time away from Chris and Megan than she wants, causing her to worry that the two are spending too much time together. Tahl reveals that he is bisexual and mentions an interest in Michael's brother. Jen has taken on a new partner and they decide to fluid bond.
2	"Triggers"	August 22, 2013	Chris makes an effort to spend more time with Leigh Ann but her outside commitments continue to interfere. Michael worries that Kamala's new boyfriend is drawing too much of her focus.
3	"Disconnected"	August 29, 2013	Things have been strained with the trio with Leigh Ann traveling for work. Chris and Megan pick up Leigh Ann from the airport only to discover what's really been going on in Leigh Ann's world. Kamala asks Michael to go deeper with his new girlfriend Rachel so he can try to develop more of an emotional relationship than a sexual relationship.
4	"Truth and Consequences"	September 5, 2013	Leigh Ann gets kicked out of the house while Megan decides if she wants to be in a relationship with Leigh Ann. Tahl breaks a rule on his date with his girlfriend and Michael, Rachel and Kamala's threesome has an unexpected outcome.
5	"Boundaries"	September 12, 2013	Michael's jealousy issues come to a head when Jason and Kamala break one of his rules, and Leigh Ann faces an ultimatum.
6	"Serious Affairs"	September 19, 2013	Tensions run high in Hollywood when Chris and Megan come face to face with Leigh Ann and her boyfriend. In San Diego, Tahl and Christian prepare for their date and Jen is in for a surprise on her weekly date with Kamala.
7	"Coming Around"	September 26, 2013	Chris and Leigh Ann are apprehensive on their date, and Tahl and Christian consider taking the next step in their relationship.
8	"The Road Ahead"	October 3, 2013	The San Diego pod heads prepare for their annual lover's getaway and Chris, Leigh Ann, and Megan finally come face-to-face to discuss the future of their relationship.

== Critical response ==
In 2012, Gawker called Polyamory: Married & Dating the best reality show on television, "It works not just as the freak show that we've come to expect from reality TV, but also on a political level."
