= Willis Van Devanter =

US Supreme Court justice from 1911 to 1937

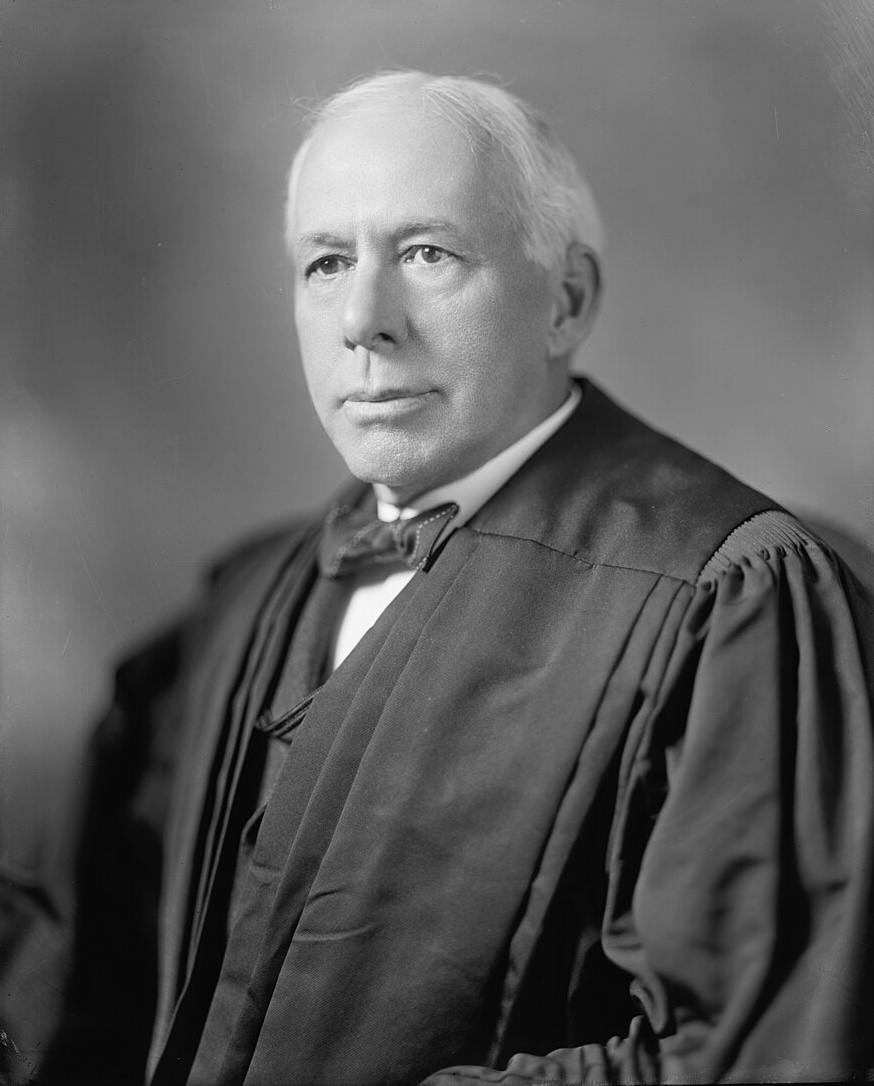
- Van Devanter, c. 1915 - 1920s

Associate Justice of the Supreme Court of the United States
- In office January 3, 1911 – June 2, 1937
- Nominated by: William Howard Taft
- Preceded by: Edward Douglass White
- Succeeded by: Hugo Black

Judge of the United States Court of Appeals for the Eighth Circuit
- In office February 4, 1903 – December 16, 1910
- Nominated by: Theodore Roosevelt
- Preceded by: Seat established
- Succeeded by: Walter Smith

Personal details
- Born: April 17, 1859 Marion, Indiana, U.S.
- Died: February 8, 1941 (aged 81) Washington, D.C., U.S.
- Resting place: Rock Creek Cemetery
- Party: Republican
- Spouse: Delice Burhans
- Children: 2
- Education: University of Cincinnati (LLB)

Willis Van Devanter (April 17, 1859 – February 8, 1941) was an American lawyer who served as an associate justice of the Supreme Court of the United States from 1911 to 1937. He was a staunch conservative and was regarded as a part of the Four Horsemen, the conservative bloc that dominated the Supreme Court during much of the 1930s.

== Early life ==
Van Devanter was born in Marion, Indiana, to a family of Dutch Americans. He attended Indiana Asbury University (now DePauw University) from 1875 to 1878 before earning a Bachelor of Laws from the Cincinnati Law School in 1881. He was a member of the Beta Theta Pi fraternity and the Knights of Pythias.

== Legal, political and state judicial careers ==
In 1884, Van Devanter moved to the Wyoming Territory where he became the city attorney of Cheyenne. He served on a commission to revise the statutes of Wyoming Territory in 1886, and as a member of the territorial legislature in 1888. He also served as an attorney to the Wyoming Stock Growers Association during the 1889–93 Johnson County War, managing to strain the local courts' (and county's) budget and delay trials while his clients and their allies worked to make key witnesses and the gunman unavailable, as well as securing favorable press coverage from the state's most influential papers while threatening to sue the Johnson County paper for slander.

He served as chief justice of the Supreme Court of Wyoming from 1889 to 1890, then resumed his private law practice. The Union Pacific and other railroads were among his major clients.

In 1896, Van Devanter represented the state of Wyoming before the U.S. Supreme Court in Ward v. Race Horse 163 U.S. 504 (1896). This involved a state poaching charge for hunting out of season, and its purported conflict with an Indian treaty that allowed the activity. The Native Americans won in the U.S. Federal District Court; the judgment was reversed on appeal to the Supreme Court by a 7–1 majority.

From 1897 to 1903, Van Devanter served in Washington, D.C., as an assistant attorney general, working in the Department of Interior. He was also a professor at George Washington University Law School from 1897 to 1903.

== Federal judicial service ==
=== Eighth Circuit Court of Appeals ===
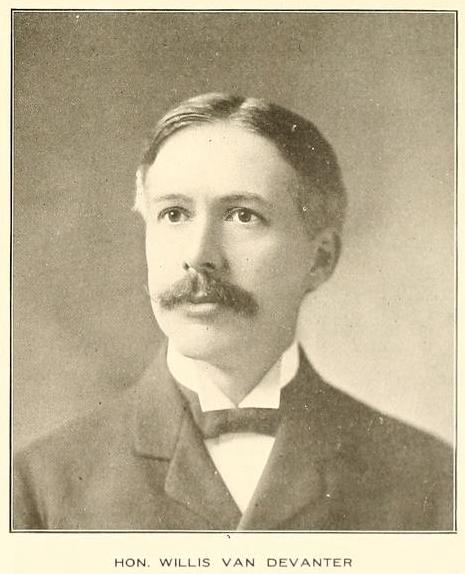
Van Devanter in 1903

On February 4, 1903, President Theodore Roosevelt nominated Van Devanter to a newly created seat on the Eighth Circuit Court of Appeals. He was confirmed by the United States Senate on February 18, 1903, and received his commission the same day.

=== United States Supreme Court ===
On December 12, 1910, President William Howard Taft nominated Van Devanter as an associate justice of the United States Supreme Court, to a seat vacated by Edward D. White. He was confirmed by the U.S. Senate on December 15, 1910, He was sworn into office on January 3, 1911.

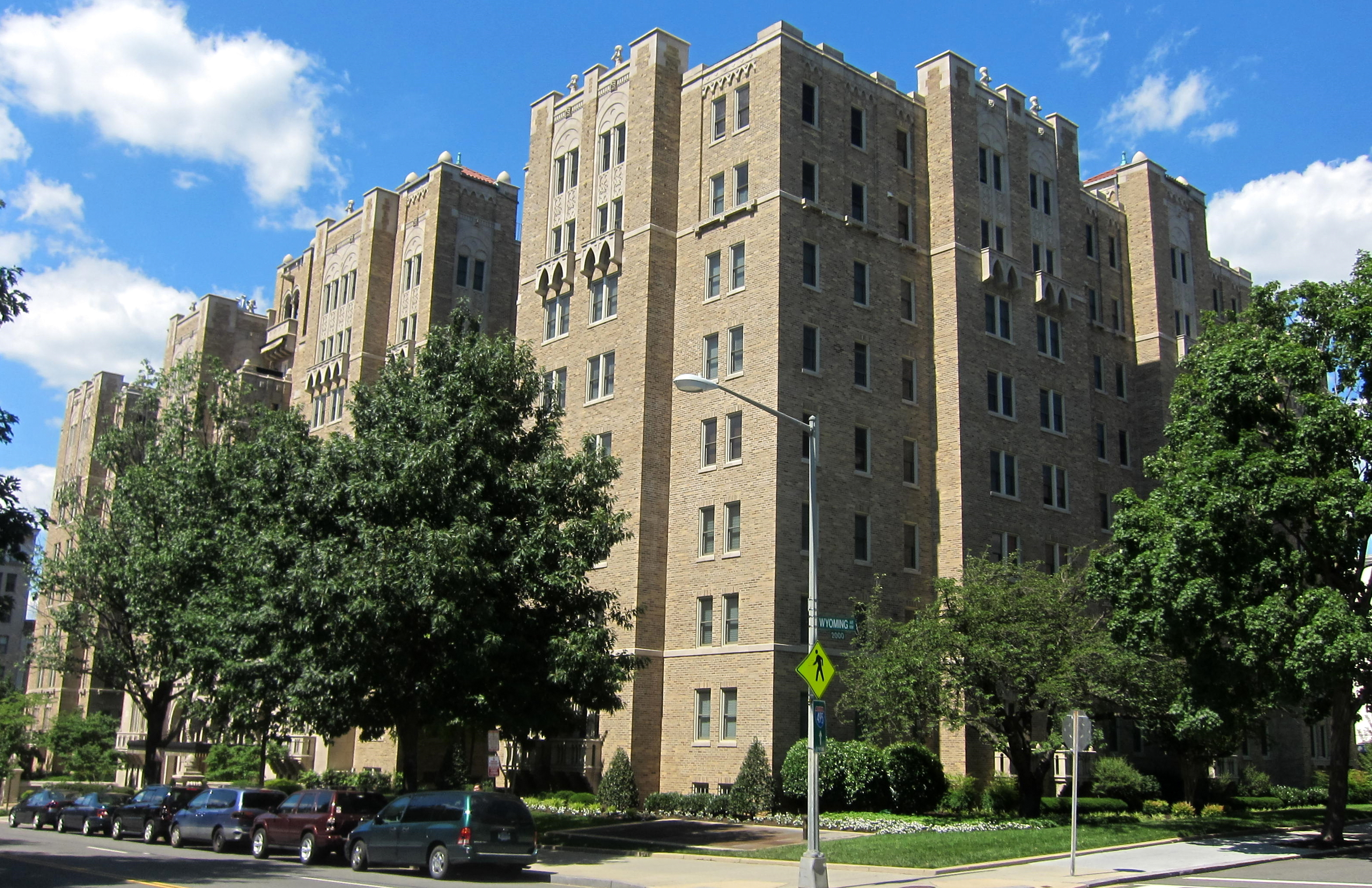
Van Devanter's former DC residence at 2108 Wyoming Avenue NW

On the court, he made his mark in opinions on public lands, Indian questions, water rights, admiralty, jurisdiction, and corporate law, but is best remembered for his opinions defending limited government in the 1920s and 1930s. He served for over twenty-five years, and voted against the Agricultural Adjustment Administration (United States v. Butler), the National Recovery Administration (Schechter Poultry Corp. v. United States), federal regulation of labor relations (National Labor Relations Board v. Jones and Laughlin Steel Corp.), the Railway Pension Act (Railroad Retirement Board v. Alton Railroad), unemployment insurance (Steward Machine Co. v. Davis), and the minimum wage (West Coast Hotel v. Parrish). For his conservatism, he was known as one of the Four Horsemen, along with Pierce Butler, James Clark McReynolds, and George Sutherland; the four would dominate the Supreme Court for over two decades, until the early 1930s. He was antisemitic but less openly so than McReynolds, who refused to interact with or speak to eventual Jewish Supreme Court Justices Louis Brandeis, Benjamin N. Cardozo, and Felix Frankfurter; Van Devanter's interactions with them were non-fractious. His opinion in United States v. Sandoval (1913) held that because the New Mexico Pueblos were "intellectually and morally inferior" and "easy victims to the evils and debasing influence of intoxicants" they were subject to restrictions on alcohol sales in Indian Country. The decision has since been the basis for Pueblo self-government and protection of tribal lands.

Van Devanter had chronic "pen paralysis", and, as a result, he wrote fewer opinions than the other justices, averaging three a term during his last decade on the Court. He rarely wrote on constitutional issues. However, he was widely respected as an expert on judicial procedure. In December 1921, Chief Justice Taft appointed him, along with Justices McReynolds and Sutherland, to draw up a proposal that would amend the nation's Judicial code and define further the jurisdiction of the nation's circuit courts.

Known widely as "the Judges' Bill", it retained mandatory jurisdiction over cases that raised questions regarding federal jurisdiction. It called for the circuit courts of appeal to have appellate jurisdiction to review "by appeal or writ of error" final decisions in the district courts, as well as for the district courts for Alaska, Hawaii, Puerto Rico, China, the Virgin Islands and the Canal Zone. The circuit courts were also empowered to modify, enforce or set aside orders of the Federal Communications Commission, the Interstate Commerce Commission, the Federal Reserve Board and the Federal Trade Commission. The proposed bill further provided that "a final judgment or decree in any suit in the highest court of a state in which a decision in the suit could be had, where is drawn in question the validity of a treaty or statute of the United States may be reviewed by the Supreme Court on a writ of error." Lastly, cases involving final decrees which brought into question the validity of a wide range of Federal or state treaties would come to the Court by certiorari. Four justices would be required to vote affirmatively to accept petitions, which meant that the Court's agenda would now be enrolled by "judicial review." The Chief Justice, together with the three Justices that had authored the Judges' Bill, made repeated trips to Congress, and in 1925, after two years of debate, the new Code was passed.

== Retirement and final years ==
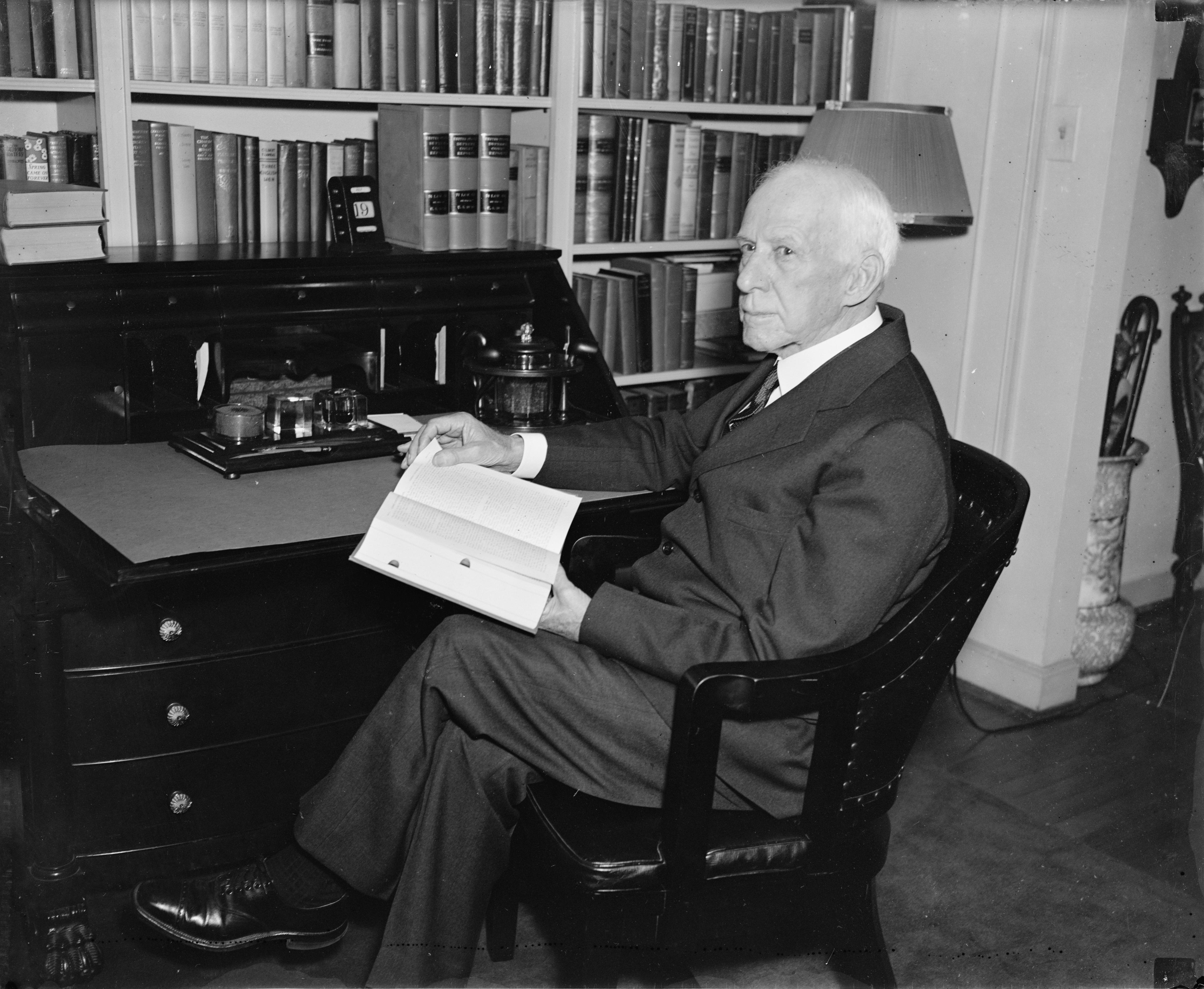
Van Devanter at his desk on May 19, 1937, shortly before his retirement.

Van Devanter's influence began to wane in the early 1930s with the departures of Chief Justice Taft and Justice Sanford, and he ultimately retired from the Supreme Court on June 2, 1937, after Congress voted full pay for justices over the age of 70 who retired. He acknowledged that he might have retired five years earlier due to illness, if not for his concern about New Deal legislation, and that he depended upon his salary. In 1932, five years prior to Van Devanter's retirement, Congress had halved Supreme Court pensions. Congress had temporarily restored them to full pay in February 1933, only to halve them again next month by the Economy Act. On May 18, 1937, the same day he made his decision to retire public, Van Devanter informed President Roosevelt that he would retire on June 2, 1937, when the Supreme Court's then-present term ended, out of "desire to avail myself of the rights, privileges and Judicial service specified in the Act of March 1, 1937, entitled 'An Act to provide for retirement of Justices of the Supreme Court.'" He was the last serving Supreme Court Justice appointed by President Taft. Van Devanter was replaced by Hugo Black.

After retirement, he lived on a 700 acres (280 ha) farm near Ellicott City, Maryland. He also remained available to hear cases in the lower courts and presided over civil trials.

At the turn of the century, Van Devanter purchased Pate Island in the Woods Bay area along Georgian Bay in Ontario, Canada. There he enjoyed hunting and fishing.

Van Devanter died in Washington, D.C., on February 8, 1941, and is buried there in Rock Creek Cemetery. His personal and judicial papers are archived at the Manuscript Division of the Library of Congress.

== See also ==
- Demographics of the Supreme Court of the United States
- List of justices of the Supreme Court of the United States
- List of United States Supreme Court justices by time in office
- List of United States Supreme Court cases by the Hughes Court
- List of United States Supreme Court cases by the Taft Court
- List of United States Supreme Court cases by the White Court
- List of United States federal judges by longevity of service

Legal offices
New seat	Judge of the United States Court of Appeals for the Eighth Circuit; 1903–1910	Succeeded by Walter Smith
Preceded by Edward White	Associate Justice of the Supreme Court of the United States; 1911–1937	Succeeded by Hugo Black
