= National Elk Refuge =

Wildlife Refuge in Jackson Hole in Wyoming

- IUCN category IV (habitat/species management area)
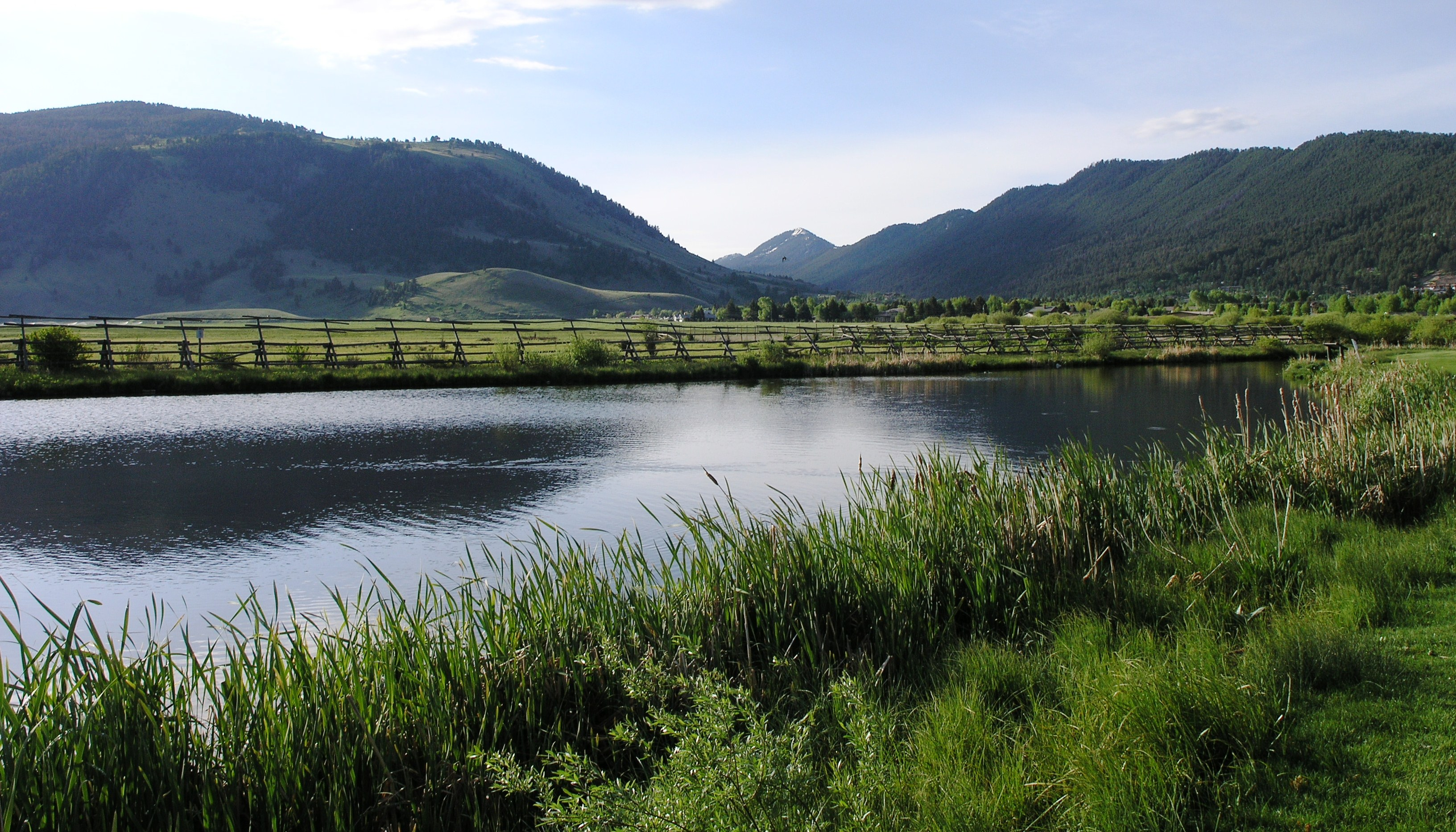
- Wetlands on the National Elk Refuge

- Location within Wyoming Location within the United States
- Location: Teton County, Wyoming, United States
- Nearest city: Jackson, WY
- Coordinates: 43°28′49″N 110°44′53″W
- Area: 25,000 acres (100 km^{2})
- Established: 1912
- Governing body: U.S. Fish and Wildlife Service
- Website: National Elk Refuge

The National Elk Refuge is a Wildlife Refuge located in Jackson Hole in the U.S. state of Wyoming. It was created in 1912 to protect habitat and provide sanctuary for one of the largest elk (also known as wapiti) herds. With a total of 24,700 acres (10,000 ha), the refuge borders the town of Jackson, Wyoming, on the southwest, Bridger-Teton National Forest on the east and Grand Teton National Park on the north. It is home to an average of 7,500 elk each winter. The refuge is managed by the U.S. Fish and Wildlife Service, an agency of the U.S. Department of the Interior.

== History ==
The refuge's elk migrate from as far away as southern Yellowstone National Park. Historically, they migrated to the present location of the refuge and further south into southwestern Wyoming during the fall, wintering on grassy plains that were both sheltered from weather and that maintained less snowfall or snow depth than surrounding lands. During the spring, the herd would follow the retreating snows and growing grasses back into the Yellowstone National Park region. The original size of the elk herd has been estimated to have been in excess of 25,000.

By the end of the 19th century, the town of Jackson had developed on important winter range, blocking off some of the migration routes used by the elk with fencing for livestock. In the late 1880s after several years of mild winters, the herd grew to an estimated 50,000. Following this, the large population experienced several consecutive harsh winters that led to famines in the Jackson valley, severely reducing the size of the herd due to lack of access to food. As thousands of starving elk became an annual problem in the winter, settlers of Jackson began to supplementally feed the animals from the feed supply of their ranches.

In addition to confronting these new obstacles on their migration routes and harsh winters, elk were threatened by poachers who hunted the animals for their ivory teeth. Elk ivories were used to decorate jewelry, including pendants for members of the ironically named the fraternity Benevolent and Protective Order of Elks.

The so-called "elk problem" was blamed by white settlers on hunting pressures by surrounding Native American tribes (Bannock, Eastern Shoshone, Northern Shoshone, Crow, Interior Salish). This led to the Bannock War of 1895 which involved twenty-seven white settlers from the Jackson area who violently confronted an Indigenous family hunting elk, a traditional food source, to the south of Yellowstone.

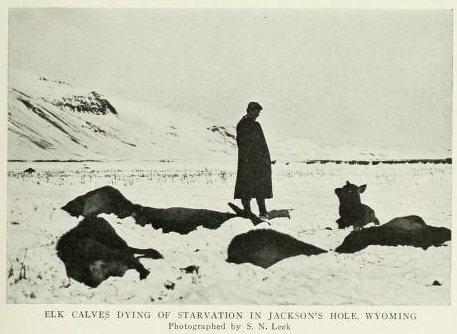
Elk calves dying of starvation in Jackson's Hole, Wyoming. Photo by Stephen Nelson Leek. Published in Bird Lore, 1913.

The leading advocate for the Jackson elk herd was rancher, sports hunter, and photographer Stephen Nelson Leek (1858–1943) who arrived in the valley in 1888. Leek documented years of elk famines and the success of supplemental feeding on his ranch for decades, sending photographs to the Governor of Wyoming and to Congress in support of his call for funding of food and land for the elk. He also published photographs of the elk famine in such sporting journals as Outdoor Life and Field and Stream, and toured the country with a lantern slideshow and film of elk in Jackson, promoting the conservation of elk. William Temple Hornaday featured Leek's photographs of elk in his book Our Vanishing Wildlife: Its Extermination and Preservation and joined Leek's appeal to Congress to pass a bill to support the herd in 1911. Leek was also involved in the Bannock War of 1895.

In part due to Leek's advocacy, in 1909 the Wyoming legislature provided $5,000 to purchase hay to feed the elk herd. This was followed by Congress appropriating $20,000 in 1911 to protect the elk in Jackson Herd, and an additional $45,000 in 1912 to create an elk refuge by merging public and purchased land, which was expanded in the decades after. The initial parcel of land was named the Elk Refuge in 1912 and renamed the National Elk Refuge in 1940.

== Management ==
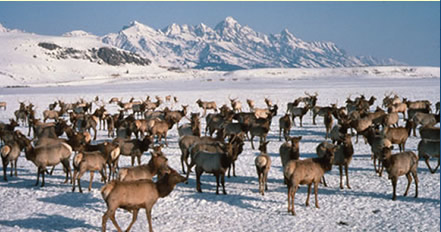
Elk during winter on the refuge

The elk herd survives the hard winters of Jackson Hole through a supplementary feeding program that lasted over a century and a lottery-based, permitted hunting program. Today, the feeding program is slowly being stopped due to the risk it poses on the animals, such as spreading disease, as well as making the herd reliant on humans.

Each year, the naturally shed elk antlers are collected from the refuge by the Boy Scouts of America, a tradition since they got a permit to due so in 1968. The antlers are brought to Jackson, where they are sorted and sold at the "elk fest" auction, with 75% of the proceeds returned to the refuge, where they are used for irrigation of the grasses to maintain maximum natural food supply. Ten to eleven thousand pounds (4,500 to 5,000 kg) of antlers are auctioned each year. The increase in value has resulted in a commensurate rise in antler theft, and the 2017 auction set a new record price of $18.79/lb.

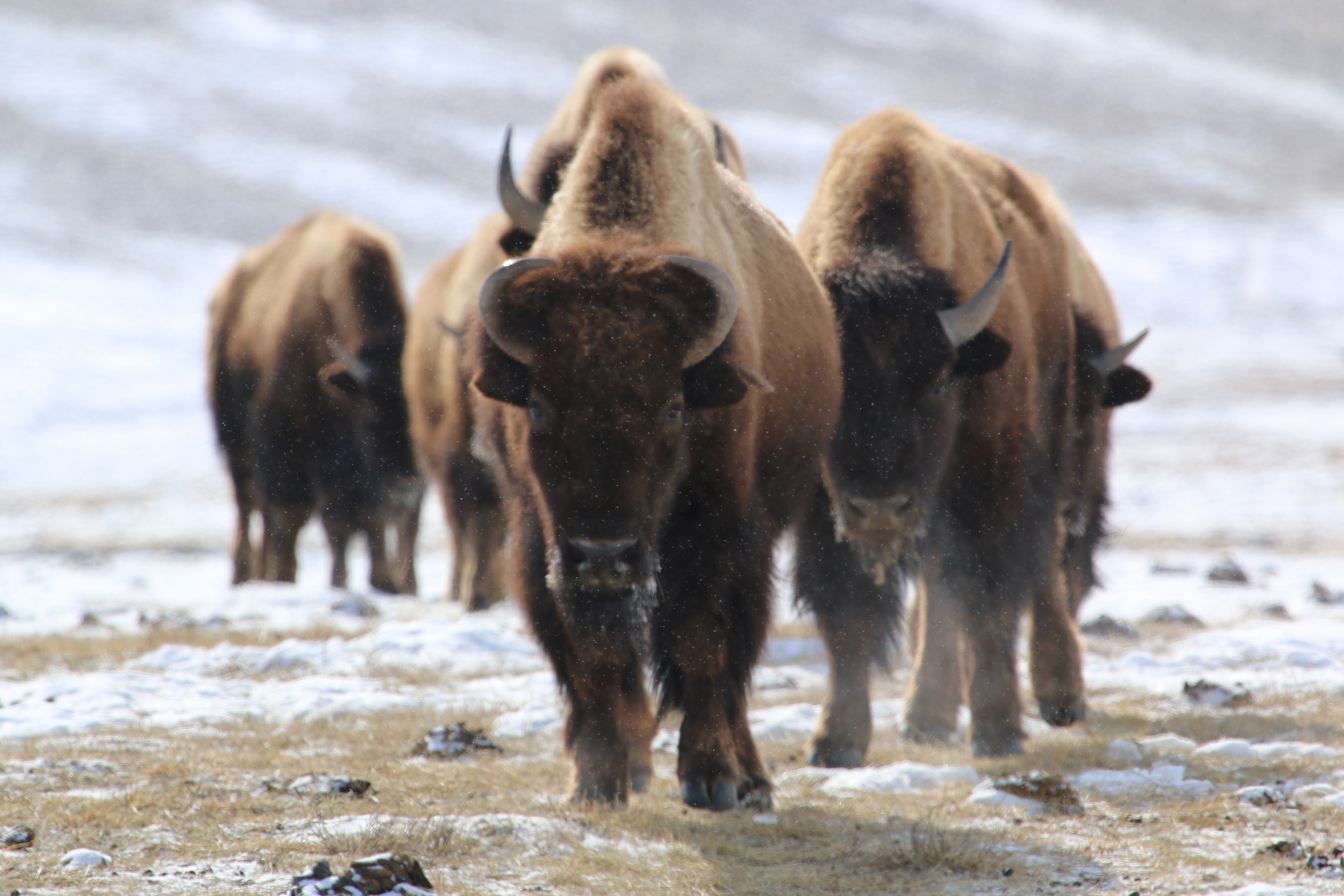
A group of bison trudge across the landscape at the National Elk Refuge.

The refuge also provides horse drawn sleigh rides to the public during the winter months so that visitors have the opportunity to see portions of the herd up close.

== Description ==
The furthest consistent migration of elk to the refuge is currently from the southern portion of Yellowstone National Park, making it the second-longest ungulate migration in the lower 48 states. (The migration of pronghorn between the Green River basin and Jackson Hole is longer).

The refuge is nearly 25,000 acres (10,000 ha) of meadows and marshes along the valley floor, sagebrush and rock outcroppings along the mountain foothills. The largest single herd of bison under federal management, comprising 1,000 plus individuals, also winter on the refuge. Bighorn sheep, along with pronghorn, mule deer can be found. Rare sightings of wolf packs and grizzly bears have occurred, while coyotes and red foxes are more common. The most abundant birds include red-winged blackbirds, magpies, crows and ravens, along with trumpeter swans, which can be found along Flat Creek, which flows out of the refuge south into the town of Jackson. A total of 47 mammal species and 147 bird species have been documented on the refuge.

The refuge has a lower elevation and much milder climate than the rest of the Greater Yellowstone Ecosystem, which is why so many animals are drawn to winter on it. Most of it is snow-covered from November until March. Snowfalls are followed by sunny days, when some of the snow melts temporarily. South-facing slopes are free of snow for most of the winter.

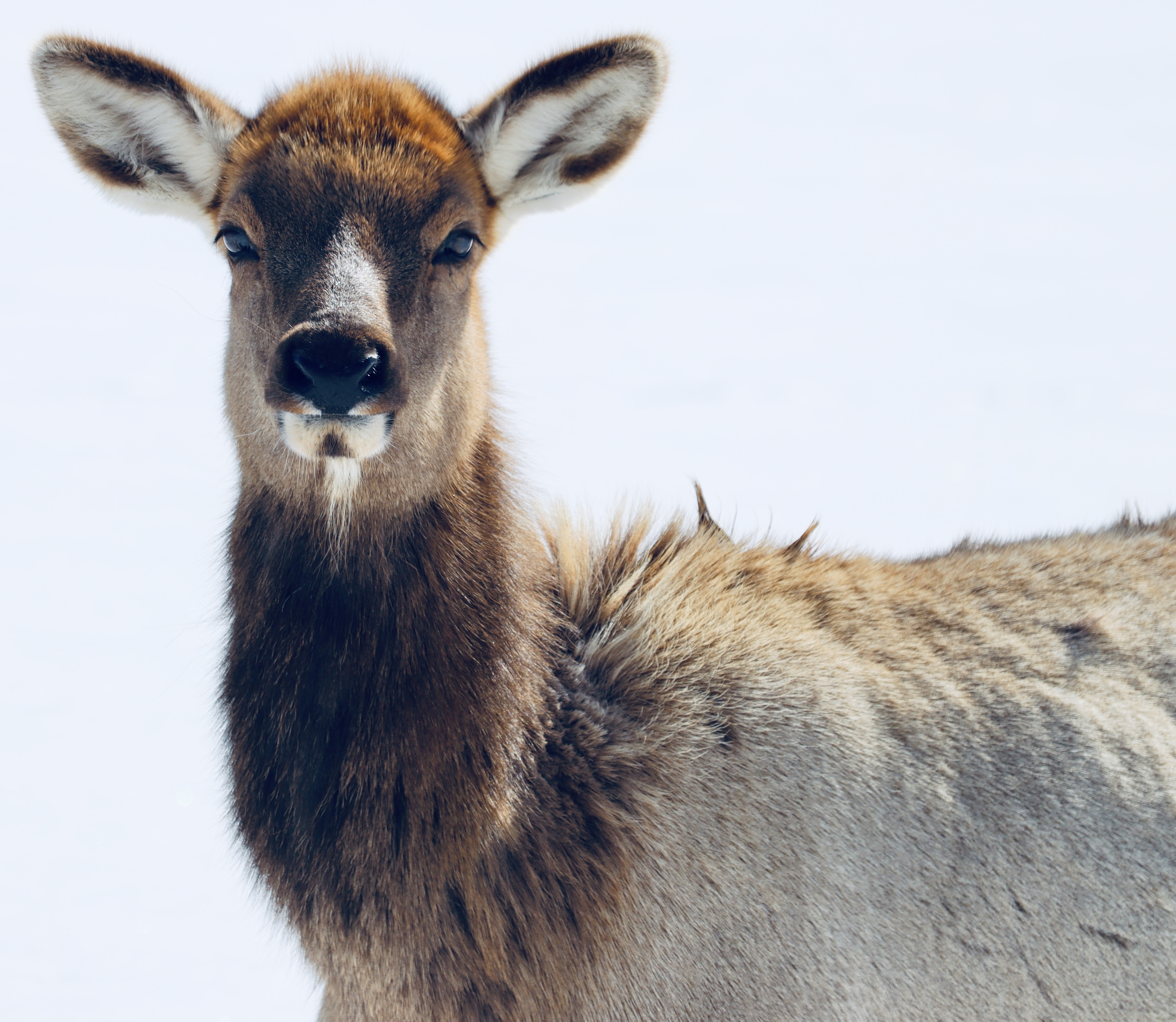
A young elk at the National Elk Refuge, March 2024.

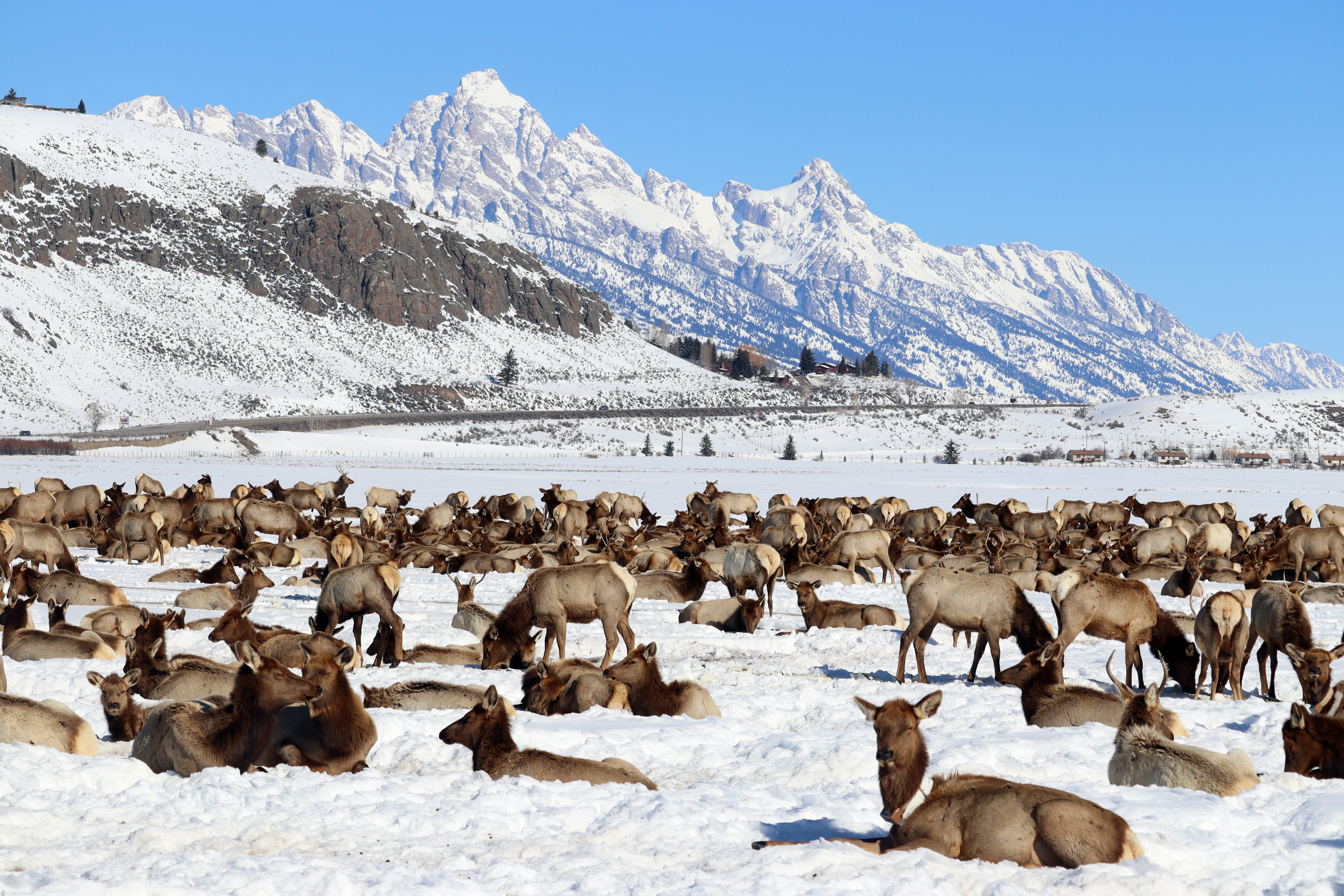
National Elk Refuge, Teton Range, March 2024.

== Bibliography ==
- Galloway, N. L., Monello, R. J., Brimeyer, D., Cole, E., & Hobbs, N. T. (2017). Model Forecasting of the Impacts of Chronic Wasting Disease on the Jackson Elk Herd.
