= List of United States Supreme Court cases, volume 163 =

Supreme Court of the United States
- Interactive map of Supreme Court of the United States
- 38°53′26″N 77°00′16″W
- Established: March 4, 1789; 236 years ago
- Location: Washington, D.C.
- Coordinates: 38°53′26″N 77°00′16″W
- Composition method: Presidential nomination with Senate confirmation
- Authorised by: Constitution of the United States, Art. III, § 1
- Judge term length: life tenure, subject to impeachment and removal
- Number of positions: 9 (by statute)
- Website: supremecourt.gov

This is a list of cases reported in volume 163 of United States Reports, decided by the Supreme Court of the United States in 1896.

== Justices of the Supreme Court at the time of volume 163 U.S. ==
The Supreme Court is established by Article III, Section 1 of the Constitution of the United States, which says: "The judicial Power of the United States, shall be vested in one supreme Court . . .". The size of the Court is not specified; the Constitution leaves it to Congress to set the number of justices. Under the Judiciary Act of 1789 Congress originally fixed the number of justices at six (one chief justice and five associate justices). Since 1789 Congress has varied the size of the Court from six to seven, nine, ten, and back to nine justices (always including one chief justice).

When the cases in volume 163 were decided the Court comprised the following nine members:

Portrait	Justice	Office	Home State	Succeeded	Date confirmed by the Senate (Vote)	Tenure on Supreme Court
	Melville Fuller	Chief Justice	Illinois	Morrison Waite	July 20, 1888 (41–20)	October 8, 1888 – July 4, 1910 (Died)
	Stephen Johnson Field	Associate Justice	California	newly created seat	March 10, 1863 (Acclamation)	May 10, 1863 – December 1, 1897 (Retired)
	John Marshall Harlan	Associate Justice	Kentucky	David Davis	November 29, 1877 (Acclamation)	December 10, 1877 – October 14, 1911 (Died)
	Horace Gray	Associate Justice	Massachusetts	Nathan Clifford	December 20, 1881 (51–5)	January 9, 1882 – September 15, 1902 (Died)
	David Josiah Brewer	Associate Justice	Kansas	Stanley Matthews	December 18, 1889 (53–11)	January 6, 1890 – March 28, 1910 (Died)
	Henry Billings Brown	Associate Justice	Michigan	Samuel Freeman Miller	December 29, 1890 (Acclamation)	January 5, 1891 – May 28, 1906 (Retired)
	George Shiras Jr.	Associate Justice	Pennsylvania	Joseph P. Bradley	July 26, 1892 (Acclamation)	October 10, 1892 – February 23, 1903 (Retired)
	Edward Douglass White	Associate Justice	Louisiana	Samuel Blatchford	February 19, 1894 (Acclamation)	March 12, 1894 – December 18, 1910 (Continued as chief justice)
	Rufus W. Peckham	Associate Justice	New York	Howell Edmunds Jackson	December 9, 1895 (Acclamation)	January 6, 1896 – October 24, 1909 (Died)

== Notable cases in 163 U.S. ==
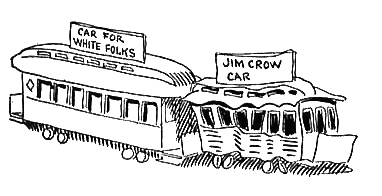
1904 caricature of "White" and "Jim Crow" rail cars by John T. McCutcheon

=== Plessy v. Ferguson ===
Plessy v. Ferguson, 163 U.S. 537 (1896), is regarded as one of the worst decisions in U.S. Supreme Court history, solidifying the practice of "Jim Crow". It is a landmark decision in which the Court ruled that racial segregation laws did not violate the U.S. Constitution as long as the facilities for each race were equal in quality, a doctrine that came to be known as "separate but equal". The decision legitimized the many state laws re-establishing racial segregation that had been passed in the American South after the end of the Reconstruction Era (1865–1877). Despite its infamy, the decision itself has never been explicitly overruled. But a series of the Court's later decisions, beginning with the 1954 Brown v. Board of Education—which held that the "separate but equal" doctrine is unconstitutional in the context of public schools and educational facilities—have severely weakened Plessy to the point that it is considered to have been de facto overruled.

=== Wong Wing v. United States ===
In Wong Wing v. United States, 163 U.S. 228 (1896), the Supreme Court found that the 5th and 6th Amendments to the U.S. Constitution forbid imprisonment without a jury trial for non-citizens convicted of illegal entry to, or presence in, the United States. This case established that non-citizens subject to criminal proceedings are entitled to the same constitutional protections available to citizens. The ruling was issued on the same day as the court upheld racial segregation laws in its infamous Plessy v. Ferguson decision.

=== Lucas v. United States ===
In Lucas v. United States, 163 U.S. 612 (1896), the Supreme Court held that whether a Negro freedman was a member of the Choctaw Nation was a question of fact for a jury, and his non-Indian status may not be presumed.

=== Ball v. United States ===
Ball v. United States, 163 U.S. 662 (1896), is one of the earliest Supreme Court cases interpreting the Double Jeopardy Clause. Departing from the English common law rule, and from early decisions of the state high courts of New York and Massachusetts, the Court held that—under the Double Jeopardy Clause—the insufficiency of an initial indictment did not result in a jeopardy bar of acquittal, as long as the first court had jurisdiction.

== Citation style ==
Under the Judiciary Act of 1789 the federal court structure at the time comprised District Courts, which had general trial jurisdiction; Circuit Courts, which had mixed trial and appellate (from the US District Courts) jurisdiction; and the United States Supreme Court, which had appellate jurisdiction over the federal District and Circuit courts—and for certain issues over state courts. The Supreme Court also had limited original jurisdiction (i.e., in which cases could be filed directly with the Supreme Court without first having been heard by a lower federal or state court). There were one or more federal District Courts and/or Circuit Courts in each state, territory, or other geographical region.

The Judiciary Act of 1891 created the United States Courts of Appeals and reassigned the jurisdiction of most routine appeals from the district and circuit courts to these appellate courts. The Act created nine new courts that were originally known as the "United States Circuit Courts of Appeals." The new courts had jurisdiction over most appeals of lower court decisions. The Supreme Court could review either legal issues that a court of appeals certified or decisions of court of appeals by writ of certiorari.

Bluebook citation style is used for case names, citations, and jurisdictions.

- "# Cir." = United States Court of Appeals
  - e.g., "3d Cir." = United States Court of Appeals for the Third Circuit
- "C.C.D." = United States Circuit Court for the District of . . .
  - e.g.,"C.C.D.N.J." = United States Circuit Court for the District of New Jersey
- "D." = United States District Court for the District of . . .
  - e.g.,"D. Mass." = United States District Court for the District of Massachusetts
- "E." = Eastern; "M." = Middle; "N." = Northern; "S." = Southern; "W." = Western
  - e.g.,"C.C.S.D.N.Y." = United States Circuit Court for the Southern District of New York
  - e.g.,"M.D. Ala." = United States District Court for the Middle District of Alabama
- "Ct. Cl." = United States Court of Claims
- The abbreviation of a state's name alone indicates the highest appellate court in that state's judiciary at the time.
  - e.g.,"Pa." = Supreme Court of Pennsylvania
  - e.g.,"Me." = Supreme Judicial Court of Maine

== List of cases in volume 163 U.S. ==
Case Name	Page & year	Opinion of the Court	Concurring opinion(s)	Dissenting opinion(s)	Lower Court	Disposition
Western Union T. Co. v. Taggart	1 (1896)	Gray	none	none	Ind.	affirmed
Farmers' L. & T. Co. v. Chicago, P. & S. Ry. Co.	31 (1896)	Brewer	none	none	C.C.W.D. Wis.	affirmed
Kirk v. United States	49 (1896)	Brown	none	none	Ct. Cl.	affirmed
Wiggan v. Conolly	56 (1896)	Brewer	none	none	Kan.	affirmed
Dibble v. Bellingham B.L. Co.	63 (1896)	Fuller	none	none	Wash.	dismissed
Cornell v. Green	75 (1896)	Gray	none	Brown	C.C.N.D. Ill.	dismissed
Lowe v. Kansas	81 (1896)	Gray	none	Brown	Kan.	affirmed
Northern P.R.R. Co. v. Egeland	93 (1896)	Peckham	none	none	8th Cir.	affirmed
Telfener v. Russ	100 (1896)	Field	none	none	5th Cir.	rehearing denied
Murray v. Louisiana	101 (1896)	Shiras	none	none	La.	affirmed
Salina S. Co. v. Salina C.I. Co.	109 (1896)	Shiras	none	none	Sup. Ct. Terr. Utah	affirmed
Barnitz v. Beverly	118 (1896)	Shiras	none	none	Kan.	reversed
United States v. Rider	132 (1896)	Fuller	none	none	C.C.S.D. Ohio	dismissed
Harrison v. United States	140 (1896)	Fuller	none	none	N.D. Ala.	reversed
Illinois C.R.R. Co. v. Illinois	142 (1896)	Gray	none	none	Ill.	reversed
Webster v. Daly	155 (1896)	Fuller	none	none	C.C.S.D.N.Y.	dismissed
Perego v. Dodge	160 (1896)	Fuller	none	none	Sup. Ct. Terr. Utah	affirmed
Singer Mfg. Co. v. June Mfg. Co	169 (1896)	White	none	none	C.C.N.D. Ill.	reversed
The name of a patented article that comes to generically describe that article falls into the public domain upon expiration of the patent; but, it amounts to unfair competition when other parties mislead the public by suggesting that its product is manufactured by the patenting company.
Singer Mfg. Co. v. Bent	205 (1896)	White	none	none	C.C.N.D. Ill.	reversed
Bacon v. Texas	207 (1896)	Peckham	none	none	Tex. Civ. App.	dismissed
Wong Wing v. United States	228 (1896)	Shiras	Field	Field	C.C.E.D. Mich.	reversed
United States v. Winchester & P.R.R. Co.	244 (1896)	Harlan	none	none	Ct. Cl.	reversed
United States v. Laws	258 (1896)	Peckham	none	none	6th Cir.	certification
Edwards v. Bates Cnty.	269 (1896)	White	none	none	C.C.W.D. Mo.	reversed
Hanford v. Davies	273 (1896)	Harlan	none	none	C.C.D. Wash.	affirmed
Rio Grande W. Ry. Co. v. Leak	280 (1896)	Harlan	none	none	Sup. Ct. Terr. Utah	affirmed
Knights of Pythias v. Kalinski	289 (1896)	Brown	none	none	5th Cir.	affirmed
Hennington v. Georgia	299 (1896)	Harlan	none	Fuller	Ga.	affirmed
Huntington v. Saunders	319 (1896)	Fuller	none	none	1st Cir.	dismissed
Burfenning v. Chicago et al. Ry. Co.	321 (1896)	Brewer	none	none	Minn.	affirmed
Union Nat'l Bank v. Louisville et al. Ry. Co.	325 (1896)	Brewer	none	none	Ill.	dismissed
Webster v. Luther	331 (1896)	Harlan	none	none	Minn.	affirmed
Hilborn v. United States	342 (1896)	Brown	none	none	Ct. Cl.	affirmed
The Steamer Coquitlam	346 (1896)	Harlan	none	none	9th Cir.	certification
Texas & P. Ry. Co. v. Gentry	353 (1896)	Harlan	none	none	5th Cir.	affirmed
Southern P.R.R. Co. v. Tomlinson	369 (1896)	Gray	none	none	Sup. Ct. Terr. Ariz.	reversed
Talton v. Mayes	376 (1896)	White	none	none	C.C.W.D. Ark.	affirmed
Meyer v. Richards	385 (1896)	White	none	none	C.C.E.D. La.	reversed
Bank of Comm. v. Tennessee	416 (1896)	Peckham	none	none	Tenn.	multiple
United States v. Realty Co.	427 (1896)	Peckham	none	none	C.C.E.D. La.	affirmed
Black v. Elkhorn M. Co.	445 (1896)	Peckham	none	none	9th Cir.	affirmed
Faust v. United States	452 (1896)	Shiras	none	none	N.D. Tex.	affirmed
Eddy v. Lafayette	456 (1896)	Shiras	none	none	8th Cir.	affirmed
Grayson v. Lynch	468 (1896)	Brown	none	none	Sup. Ct. Terr. N.M.	affirmed
Union P. Ry. Co. v. James	485 (1896)	Brewer	none	none	8th Cir.	affirmed
Missouri et al. Ry. Co. v. Cook	491 (1896)	Fuller	none	none	Kan.	affirmed
United States v. Allen	499 (1896)	White	none	none	9th Cir.	reversed
Ward v. Race Horse	504 (1896)	White	none	Brown	C.C.D. Wyo.	reversed
Indiana v. Kentucky	520 (1896)	Fuller	none	none	original	boundary set
Plessy v. Ferguson	537 (1896)	Brown	none	Harlan	La.	affirmed
Union P. Ry. Co. v. Chicago et al. Ry. Co.	564 (1896)	Fuller	none	Shiras	8th Cir.	affirmed
Lucas v. United States	612 (1896)	Shiras	none	none	C.C.W.D. Ark.	reversed
Brown v. Wygant	618 (1896)	Shiras	none	none	Sup. Ct. D.C.	affirmed
United States v. Perkins	625 (1896)	Brown	none	none	N.Y. Sup. Ct.	affirmed
United States v. Fitch	631 (1896)	per curiam	none	none	N.Y. Sup. Ct.	affirmed
Wiborg v. United States	632 (1896)	Fuller	none	Harlan	E.D. Pa.	multiple
United States v. Ball	662 (1896)	Gray	none	none	C.C.E.D. Tex.	multiple

== Sources ==
- Amar, Akhil Reed (2011). "Plessy v. Ferguson and the Anti-Canon". Pepperdine Law Review. 39 (1): 75–90.
- Epstein, Richard A. (1995). Forbidden Grounds: The Case Against Employment Discrimination Laws. Cambridge, Massachusetts: Harvard University Press. ISBN 0-6743-0809-3.
- Lofgren, Charles A. (1987). The Plessy Case: A Legal-Historical Interpretation. New York: Oxford University Press. ISBN 978-0-19-505684-6.
- Nowak, John E.; Rotunda, Ronald D. (2012). Treatise on Constitutional Law: Substance and Procedure (5th ed.). Eagan, Minnesota: West Thomson/Reuters. OCLC 798148265.
- Schauer, Frederick (1997). "Generality and Equality". Law and Philosophy. 16 (3): 279–97. doi:10.2307/3504874. JSTOR 3504874.

== See also ==
- Certificate of division
