= Stephen Nelson Leek =

Wildlife photographer and conservationist

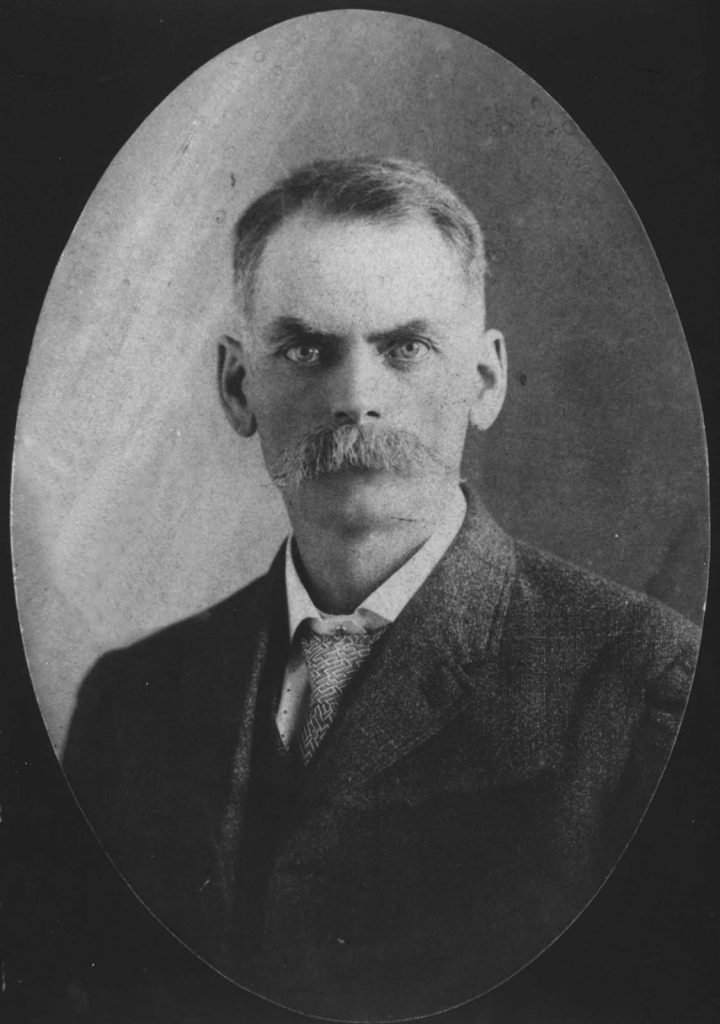
Stephen Nelson Leek

Stephen Nelson Leek (1858–1943) was a founding settler of Jackson Hole, (formerly known as Jackson's Hole) Wyoming. In addition to being a trapper, hunting guide, and dude rancher, Leek is best known as a wildlife photographer who documented dead and starving elk (wapiti) during annual winter famines at the beginning of the twentieth century as a way to promote their protection. Known as the "Father of the Elk," Leek played an instrumental role in convincing Congress to establish the National Elk Refuge in 1912.

== Biography ==
=== Early life ===
Leek was born in Turkey Point, Ontario, Canada in 1858. At a young age his family moved to the United States, first to Illinois, Nebraska, and Utah. In the 1880s, Leek moved west to Wyoming, first to the Bighorn Mountains where he lived in a cabin (that is now on display at the Old Trail Town in Cody), and sometime between 1886 and 1888 to Jackson.

Leek took on many different jobs throughout his lifetime. He was the first in the area to irrigate his ranch and plant grain; established the valley's first water-powered sawmill in 1893; and by 1895 had one of the largest barns in the county. In 1907 Leek served as a Uinta County Representative in the Wyoming House of Representatives. Consistently, though, Leek worked as a hunting guide or "outfitter" and developed a reputation as one of the best guides in the region, with wealthy clients from the northeastern U.S., including George Eastman.

Leek was among the first group of pioneers in Jackson, homesteading a ranch three miles south of the town. Over the first decade, the settler population of the area grew from 23 to 639 by 1900, and by 1920 doubled to more than 1,381 residents. Leek was among those who moved west through the Homestead Acts, laws that allowed settlers to declare ownership of "unclaimed" land and providing 160-acre plots to qualified applicants who paid a fee of $10–15. Leek's homestead was located on Flat Creek, just south of Jackson, at the time called Marysvale. There, he began cattle ranching, expanding his ranch to 400 acres over the decades.

=== Marriage and children ===
In 1897 Leek married Sarah (Etta) Wilson (d. 1931), relative of Elijah Nicholas Wilson, founder of the town of Wilson, Wyoming. Together, they had two sons.

- Albert (Lester) Nelson Leek (1898-1934)
- Holiday (Holly) Leek (1905-1968)

== The "elk problem" ==
When Leek and other homesteaders established their farms in the open fields of Flat Creek, they began to erect fencing across the valley floor. These fences immediately disrupted migration routes that elk had used for millennia, creating a maze of barriers. Livestock also consumed the best forage, leaving limited resources for wildlife. By the late 1880s, the Jackson elk, swollen to about 50,000 after several mild winters, now encountered these new obstructions and a series of harsh winters. With elk trapped among the fencing and immobilized in deep snow, thousands died of starvation during their annual migration from Yellowstone and the Teton Range.

Leek, whose homestead location placed him at the center of these changes, became increasingly concerned about the condition of local wildlife. Like fellow settlers who made an income as hunting guides to wealthy tourists, he was concerned about the future of elk in the region, from both a conservation point of view and the future of big game hunting. Leek was one of the first in the area to suggest there be rules for how many animals each guide could claim, and that wildlife of the region was finite.

In 1909, local homesteaders began raising money to purchase hay to feed starving elk during the winter months. Desperate for food, starving elk were already raiding livestock feed supplies in the valley. After the National Elk Refuge was established in 1912, feeding elk continued for over a century and the Jackson herd became semi-domesticated in their reliance on human provided food and human presence of tourists. Today, feeding on the Refuge has largely stopped in order to prevent the spread of disease.

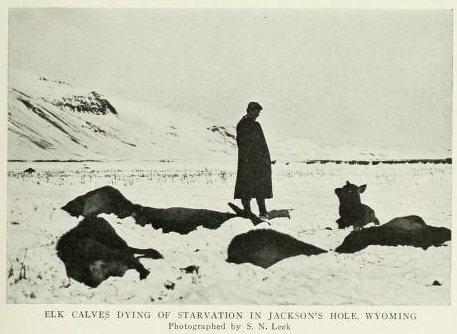
Elk Calves Dying of Starvation in Jackson's Hole, Wyoming. Photograph by S. N. Leek. Published in Bird Lore, 1913

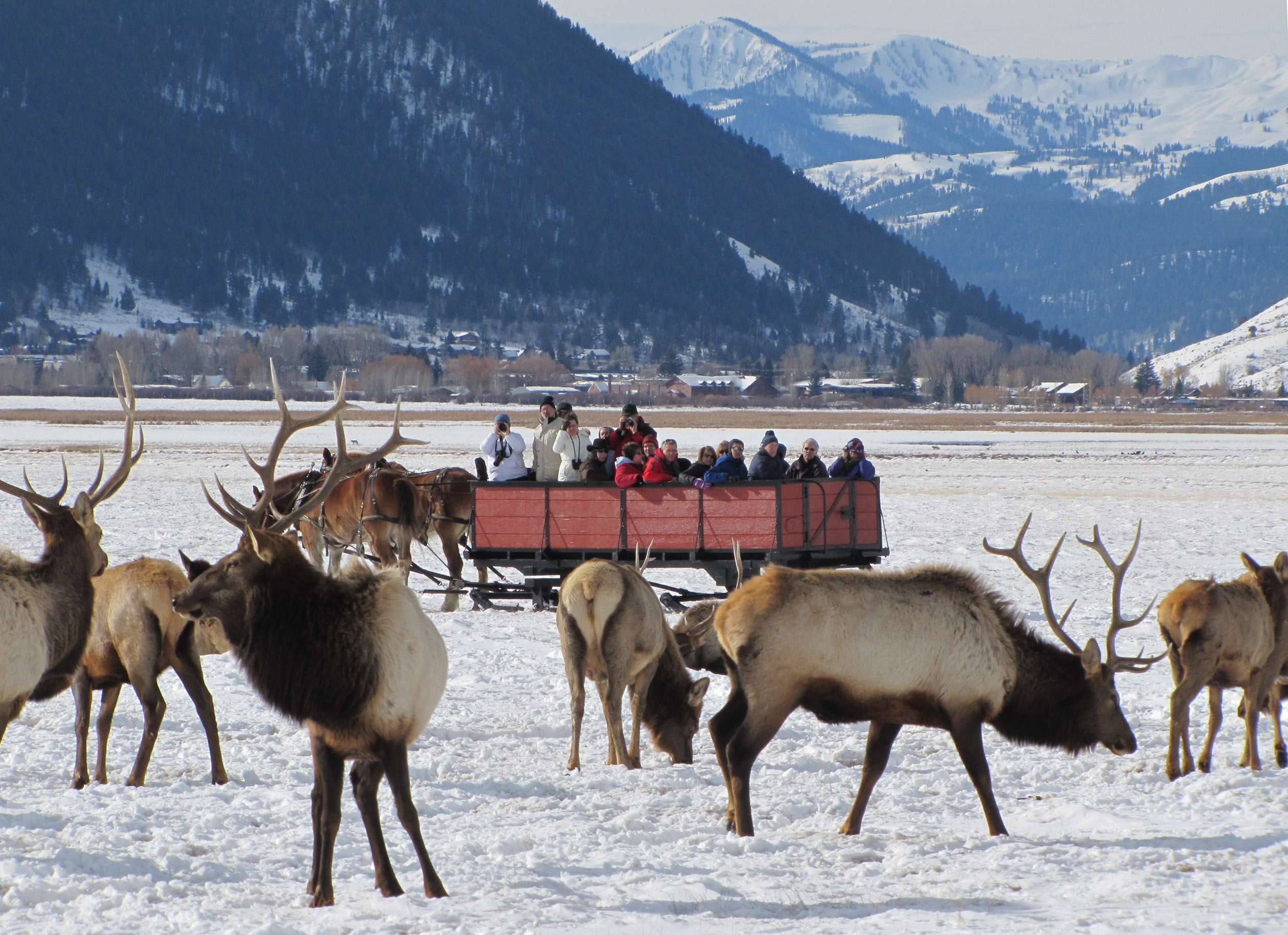
Tourists viewing elk at the National Elk Refuge, 2013

== Photography ==
Around 1891, one of Leek's frequent clients, George Eastman, founder of Eastman Kodak, gave him a camera. At first Leek used the camera to document sport hunting of elk in the region as a way to promote his services as a guide; he also provided photographic services for clients to commemorate their hunting expeditions.

When elk famines began to occur, Leek documented the plight of the elk happening right on his property. Leek took hundreds of photographs of dead and starving elk and published these photos in such journals as Bird Lore, Outdoor Life, and Field and Stream as a way to raise awareness of the issue and the need for state and federal protection. He also campaigned for elk protection through traveling lectures, lantern slideshows, and writing articles in major and regional newspapers and magazines. His widely disseminated images helped draw national attention to the crisis and played a key role in the establishment of the National Elk Refuge in 1912.

Following the establishment of the Elk Refuge, Leek continued a career as a wildlife photographer in addition to ranching and outfitting.

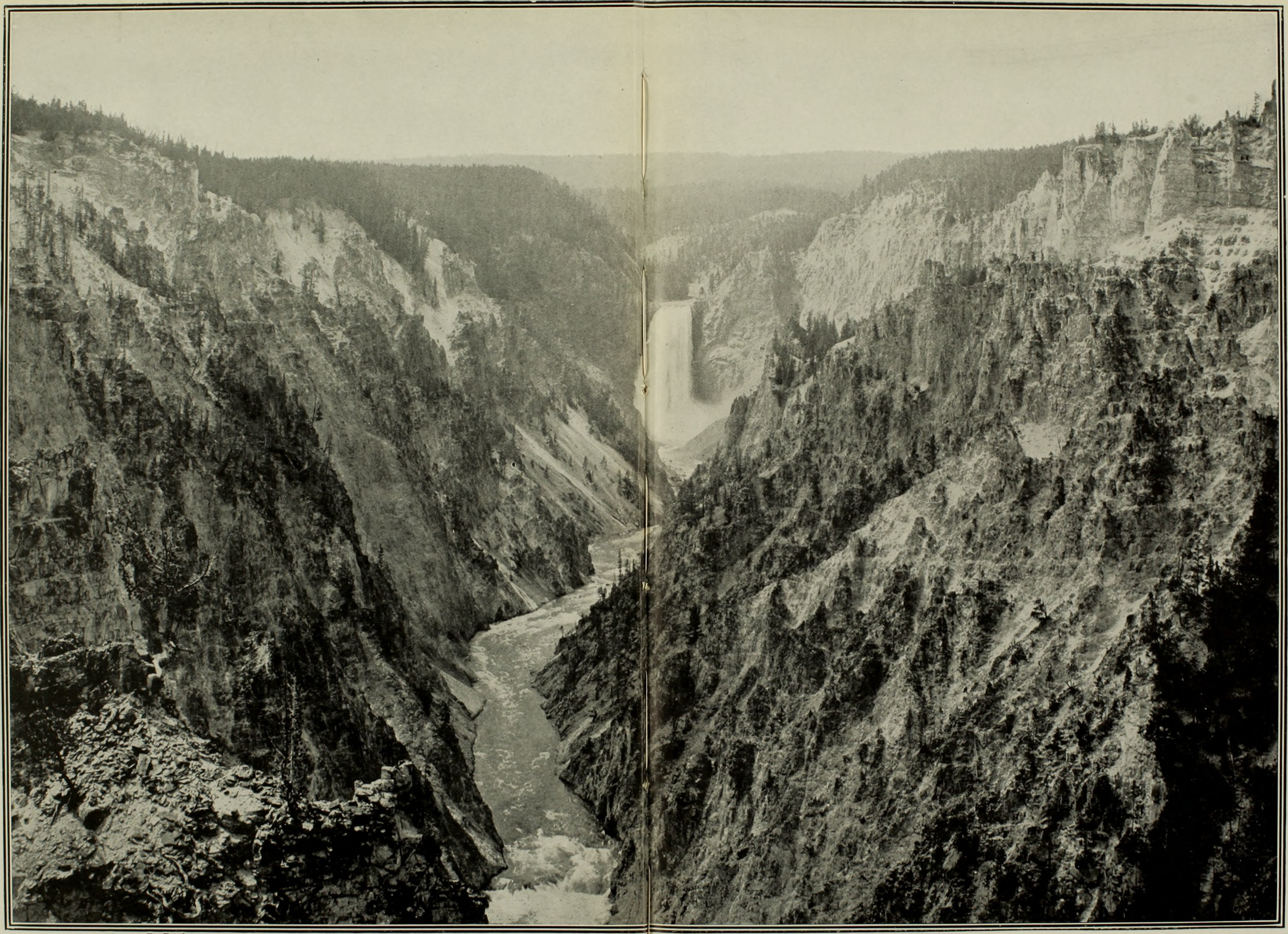
The south entrance of Teton Range. Photograph by Stephen N. Leek, in National Parks Portfolio (1921)

Leek's photographs were widely re-published, featured in such articles as William Temple Hornaday's book Our Vanishing Wildlife: Its Extermination and Preservation (1913) and article "Masterpieces of Wild Animal Photography" in Scribner's magazine (1920). His work was also used by the National Parks Department for promotional material for Grand Teton and Yellowstone national parks.

Much of Leek's photographic archive has been digitized by the American Heritage Center at the University of Wyoming.

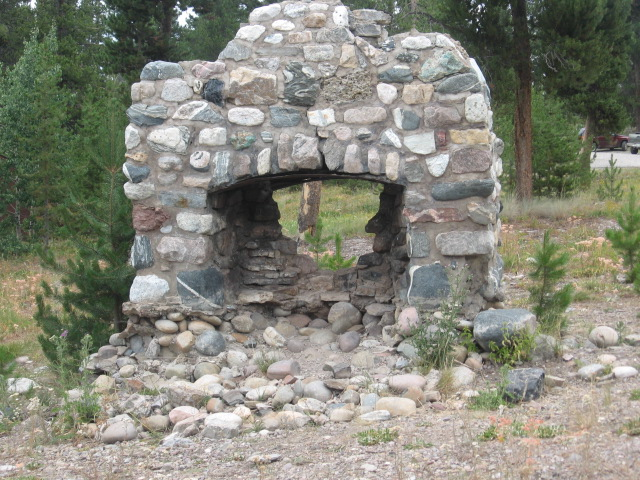
The remains of Leek's Lodge, Grand Teton National Park

== Leek's Camp ==
In 1927, Leek established Leek's Camp on the east shore of Jackson Lake in Grand Teton National Park, consisting of a central log structure and several guest cabins. Leek's Camp was a dude ranch and resort and was one of the earliest outdoor recreation resorts in the Jackson Hole area. The main building, Leek's Lodge, was nominated for the National Register of Historic Places in 1974 and listed on the Register in 1975, but later removed from the list in 2014. All that remains today is a chimney.

== Political views ==
Despite Leek's wildlife conservation legacy, his involvement in the Bannock War of 1895 makes him a complicated figure to celebrate today. Leek has been described as a "racial extremist" because of his views on Indigenous peoples, including their hunting rights. The Bannock War of 1895 led to the U.S. Supreme Court's Race Horse decision which ended all treaty-reserved rights to hunt off reservation.

== Recognition ==
The National Park Service and Wyoming Historical Society erected a historical marker titled "Stephen Leek's Camera Conservation" under the topic list of Environment in Grand Teton National Park, located at 43° 55.809′ N, 110° 38.367′ W.

Leek was inducted into the Wyoming Outdoor Hall of Fame in 2015.
