= Lucas v. United States =

- Supreme Court of the United States

Argued November 19, 1895 Decided May 25, 1896
- Full case name: Lucas v. United States
- Docket no.: 692
- Citations: 163 U.S. 612 (more) 16 S. Ct. 1168; 41 L. Ed. 282

Case history
- Prior: United States v. Lucas, (C.C.W.D. Ark.)

Holding
- Whether a Negro Freeman who was murdered was a member of the Choctaw Tribe is a question of fact for the jury, and his non-Indian status may not be presumed.

Court membership
- Chief Justice Melville Fuller Associate Justices Stephen J. Field · John M. Harlan; Horace Gray · David J. Brewer; Henry B. Brown · George Shiras Jr. Edward D. White · Rufus W. Peckham

Case opinion
- Majority: Shiras
- Peckham took no part in the consideration or decision of the case.

Laws applied
- 14 Stat. 769; 23 Stat. 362; 25 Stat. 786; 26 Stat. 81

Lucas v. United States, 163 U.S. 612 (1896), was a United States Supreme Court case in which the Court held that whether a Black Freedman was a member of the Choctaw Nation was a question of fact for the jury, and his non-Indian status may not be presumed.

== Background ==
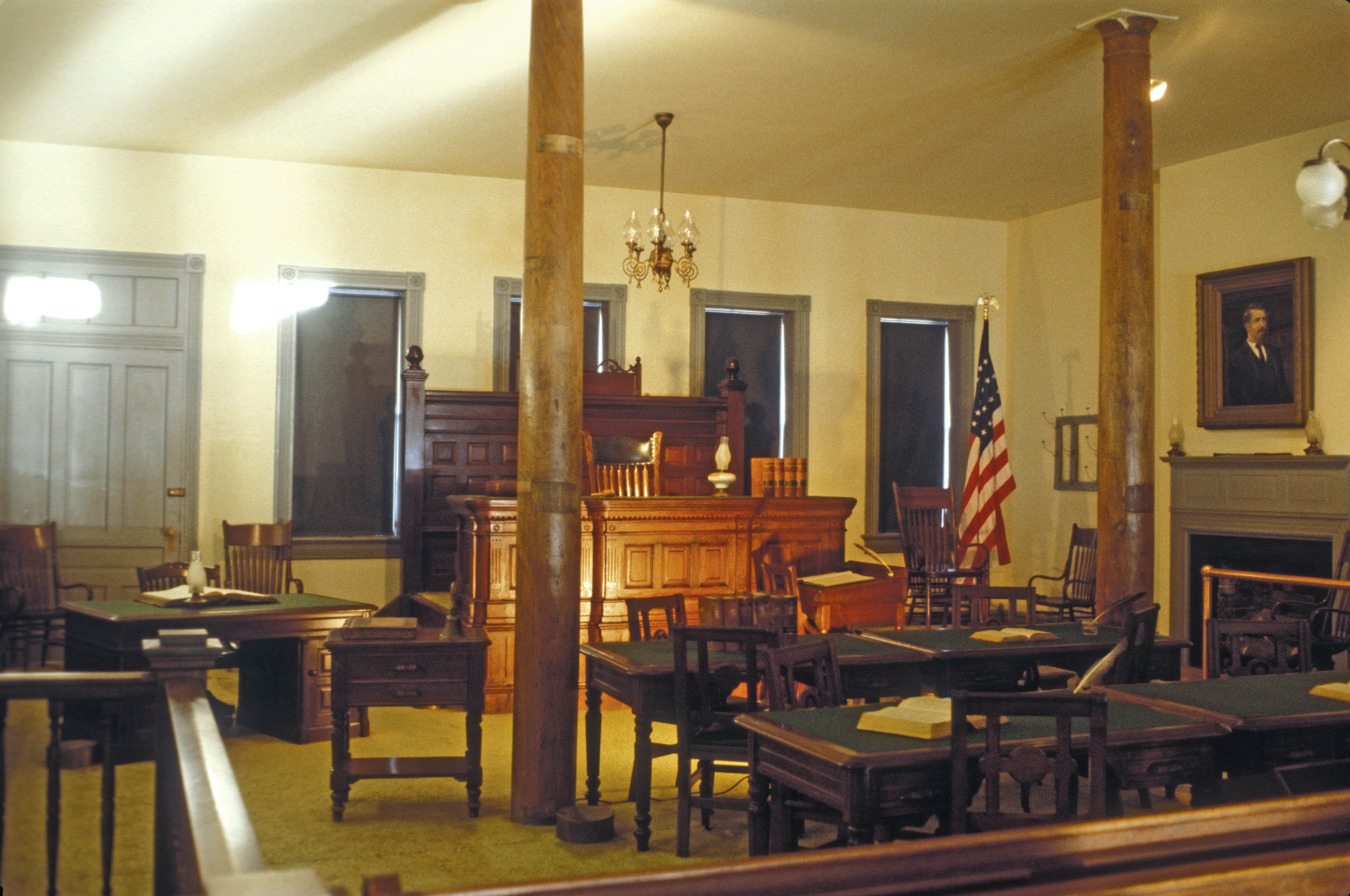
Judge Parker's courtroom where Lucas was tried

The Choctaw Nation was one of the Five Civilized Tribes in the Indian Territory (now the eastern part of Oklahoma), (Note: The first constitution was adopted in 1826 and was modeled after the United States Constitution, providing for three branches of government. This included a court system.) and under their treaty with the United States, were allowed to have its own court system to try Indian on Indian crime. When the crime was Choctaw on Choctaw, the tribal courts would handle the trial, but if it involved a non-tribal member, the case was handled by the federal court in Fort Smith, Arkansas. Tribal members included Freedmen, African-Americans who had been slaves and who had been adopted by the tribe after the Civil War.

In 1894, Eli Lucas, (Note: Lucas was also charged with larceny and had committed assault and battery.) a member of the Choctaw Nation, was indicted in the Circuit Court for the Western District of Arkansas for the murder of Levy Kemp, an African-American. (Note: Kemp was described as "half-witted.") In 1895, Lucas was tried in Judge Isaac Parker's court, where witnesses said that Lucas had followed Kemp after a ball game and killed him. (Note: The murder was particularly gruesome, Kemp was decapitated and his limbs severed from his body.) The defense claimed that Lucas was not truthful when he had boasted that he had killed Kemp, but that some other, unknown person had committed the murder. Lucas was convicted of murder, and sentenced to hang.

Lucas's attorneys filed an appeal, and the Supreme Court agreed to hear the case. (Note: Until 1889, Judge Parker heard the appeals of the cases he tried, as the Supreme Court did not hear appeals of capital cases.)

== Supreme Court ==
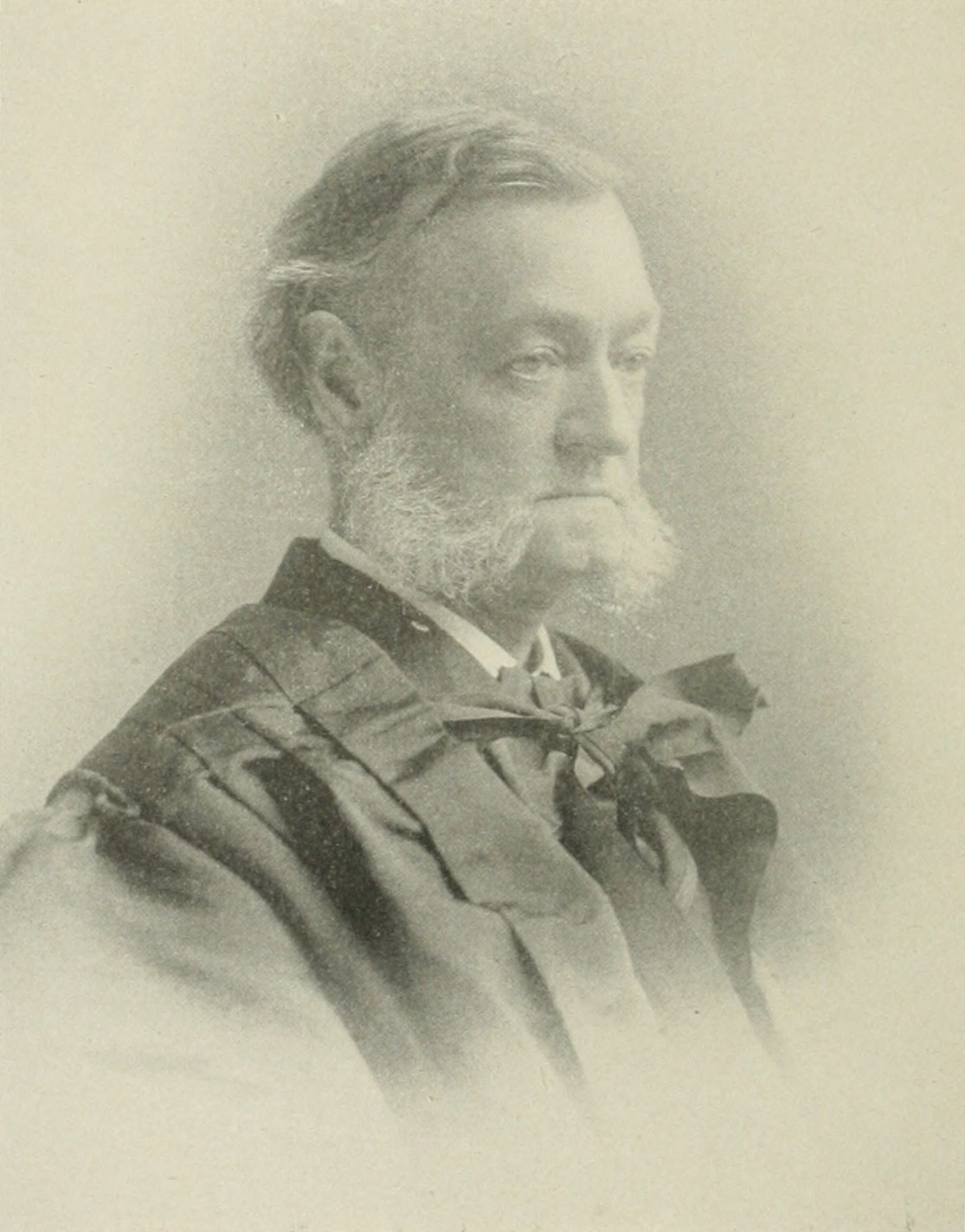
Justice Shiras, author of the Court's opinion

Justice George Shiras Jr. delivered the opinion of the Court. Although the Court agreed that Kemp was not a Choctaw Freedman and therefore not a member of the tribe, it held that Judge Parker had erred. The trial court should not have presumed that Kemp was not a member of the tribe, the government should have been required to prove that element in order to establish jurisdiction. Shiras noted that §§ 2145–2146, Revised Statutes, stated that the federal courts did not have jurisdiction over Indian on Indian crime where the tribe had a tribal court. He also held that allowing John LeFlore testify as to what Kemp had told him was hearsay and inadmissible. The Court ordered that Lucas be retried, and reversed his conviction. Lucas was then released to the Choctaw Nation for trial.
