= In re Jugiro =

- Supreme Court of the United States

Argued April 10, 1891 Decided May 11, 1891
- Full case name: In re Shibuya Jugiro
- Citations: 140 U.S. 291 (more) 11 S. Ct. 770

Court membership
- Chief Justice Melville Fuller Associate Justices Stephen J. Field · Joseph P. Bradley; John M. Harlan · Horace Gray; Samuel Blatchford · Lucius Q. C. Lamar II; David J. Brewer · Henry B. Brown

Case opinion
- Majority: Harlan, joined by Fuller, Field, Bradley, Blatchford, Lamar, Brewer, Brown
- Grey took no part in the consideration or decision of the case.

In re Jugiro, 140 U.S. 291 (1891), also called Jugiro v. Brush, was decision of the United States Supreme Court holding that habeas corpus did not reach errors committed by a state court of competent jurisdiction.

== Background ==
Shibuya Jugiro was convicted of murder in New York and sentenced to death. After the conviction and death sentence were upheld by the New York Court of Appeals the defendant filed a habeas corpus petition in a federal district court. The petition was dismissed. The Supreme Court of the United States affirmed. Jugiro filed a second habeas petition alleging that the state could not execute him because the United States Supreme Court had not set a mandate to the district court to affirm the district court decision. He also raised for the first time a claim that his conviction and sentence were invalid because members of his race were excluded from the grand jury that indicted him and the petit jury that convicted him. The district court dismissed the petition. The United States Supreme Court granted certiorari.

== Opinion of the Court ==
Despite its earlier decision in Strauder v. West Virginia the Court did not grant habeas review to the claim of jury discrimination because it was not properly raised. The Court notes that the equal protection clause does not require that non-citizens be allowed to serve on juries. They also decided federal habeas corpus did not provide a remedy for the failure of a state court to provide counsel:

The alleged assignment, at the trial of the appellant, of one as his counsel who (although he may have been an attorney at law) had not been admitted or qualified to practise as an attorney or counsellor at law in the courts of New York; the misdescription in the indictment of the wound he was charged with having inflicted upon the deceased; and the exclusion from the list of grand and petit jurors of citizens of the United States of the same race with appellant, were all matters occurring in the course of the proceedings and trial in a court of competent jurisdiction, proceeding under statutes that do not conflict with the Constitution of the United States. The errors, if any, committed by that court in respect to any of those matters, did not affect its jurisdiction of the offence or of the person accused, and cannot be reached by habeas corpus.
