= Talton v. Mayes =

- Supreme Court of the United States

Argued April 16, 1896 Decided May 18, 1896
- Full case name: Talton v. Mayes
- Citations: 163 U.S. 376 (more) 16 S. Ct. 986, 41 L. Ed. 196, 1896 U.S. LEXIS 2276

Holding
- The individual rights protections, which limit federal, and later, state governments, do not apply to tribal government.

Court membership
- Chief Justice Melville Fuller Associate Justices Stephen J. Field · John M. Harlan; Horace Gray · David J. Brewer; Henry B. Brown · George Shiras Jr. Edward D. White · Rufus W. Peckham

Case opinions
- Majority: White, joined by Fuller, Field, Gray, Brewer, Brown, Shiras, Peckham
- Dissent: Harlan

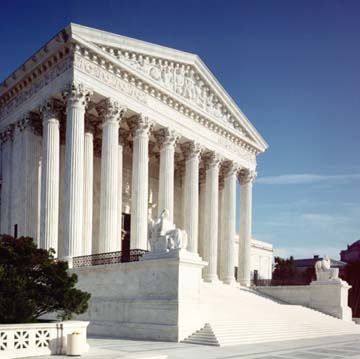
United States Supreme Court.

Talton v. Mayes, 163 U.S. 376 (1896), was a landmark United States Supreme Court case, in which the court decided that the individual rights protections, which limit federal, and later, state governments, do not apply to tribal government. It reaffirmed earlier decisions, such as the 1831 Cherokee Nation v. Georgia case, that gave Indian tribes the status of "domestic dependent nations," the sovereignty of which is independent of the federal government.

== Background ==
Talton v. Mayes was brought before the United States Supreme Court in 1896 by Robert Harrison "Bob" Talton, a Cherokee Indian convicted of the murder of a fellow Cherokee. He was sentenced to death by hanging after a trial that took place between May and December 1892. The appellant appealed the decision on the basis that the court had violated his rights by being in contradiction to the law. The US Constitution and, by the end of his trial, the Cherokee laws, demanded more than the five Grand Jury members furnished by the Cherokee Courts.

According to Justice White in the majority opinion of the Supreme Court, "Prior to May 1892, a law enacted by the legislature of the Cherokee Nation made it the duty of the judges of the circuit and district courts of the Nation, 14 days before the commencement of the first regular term of said courts, to furnish to the sheriff a list of the names of five persons, who should be summoned by the sheriff to act as grand jurors for that district during the year. The first regular term of the courts named commenced on the second Monday in May.

On November 28, 1892, a law was enacted providing for the summoning and impaneling of a grand jury of 13, the names of the persons to compose such jury to be furnished to the sheriff, as under the previous law, 14 days before the commencement of the regular term of the circuit and district courts. There was no express repeal of the provisions of the prior law. Under the terms of the act of November 28, 1892, a grand jury could not have been impaneled before the term beginning on the second Monday of May 1893. The indictment in question was returned in December 1892, by a grand jury consisting of five persons, which grand jury had been impaneled under the prior law, to serve during the year 1892." The appellant argued that the decision should be thrown out because it violated either the Fifth or the Fourteenth amendment.

The central focus of the case was on the relationship between the Cherokee Nation and the United States, and if the local government of the Cherokee Nation was dependent in any way upon the Constitution and its amendments. The Fifth Amendment to the United States Constitution states that "No person shall be held to answer for a capital, or otherwise infamous crime, unless on a presentment or indictment of a Grand Jury..." Because the grand jury consisted of fewer members than were by law required in the United States, Talton argues that it was not an actual "Grand Jury" as would be needed to fulfill the requirements for the Fifth Amendment.

The part of the Fourteenth Amendment that was of consequence in Talton v. Mayes is the very first part. The first section of the amendment states, "All persons born or naturalized in the United States, and subject to the jurisdiction thereof, are citizens of the United States and of the State wherein they reside. No State shall make or enforce any law which shall abridge the privileges or immunities of citizens of the United States; nor shall any State deprive any person of life, liberty, or property, without due process of law; nor deny to any person within its jurisdiction the equal protection of the laws."

Talton argued that he should have been subject to the federal law since he was born and raised in the United States, but this defense was not accepted by the Supreme Court because of the unique status of Indian tribes. Being "domestic dependent nations," they do not qualify as a state or a part of the federal government, and do not derive any of their local governmental powers from the Constitution and are not necessarily bound by its rules. Talton v. Mayes took place during an era known as the Assimilation Era, which lasted from the 1890s to the 1940s.

Most Native Americans were not considered citizens of the United States until Congress passed the Indian Citizenship Act of 1924.

== Decision ==
The decision of the Cherokee court was upheld with an almost unanimous vote, 8-1. The only person who dissented was Justice Harlan. The case had numerous precedents, particularly Barron v. Baltimore. Since that case was adjudicated in 1833, it had been a settled fact that the Fifth Amendment was a limitation on the powers of the federal government only, which were created by the Constitution.

Since the Court had determined several times previously that the powers of local government the Native American tribes exercised were in existence before the Constitution and therefore were not derived from it, they held in the Talton case that the Fifth Amendment held no sway over the operations of the Cherokee's local justice system, as Talton involved only Cherokee persons and laws. The Court stated that "as the powers of local self-government enjoyed by the Cherokee Nation existed prior to the constitution, they are not operated upon by the Fifth Amendment."

Talton was hanged by the Cherokee Nation in Tahlequah on July 31, 1896.

However, since the early 20th century, the Supreme Court has used the Due Process Clause of the Fourteenth Amendment (interpreted, however, to have the same meaning as the 5th amendment) to apply most of the Bill of Rights to the states through the process and doctrine of selective incorporation. Therefore, as to most, but not all, provisions of the Bill of Rights, Barron and its progeny have been circumvented, if not actually overruled.

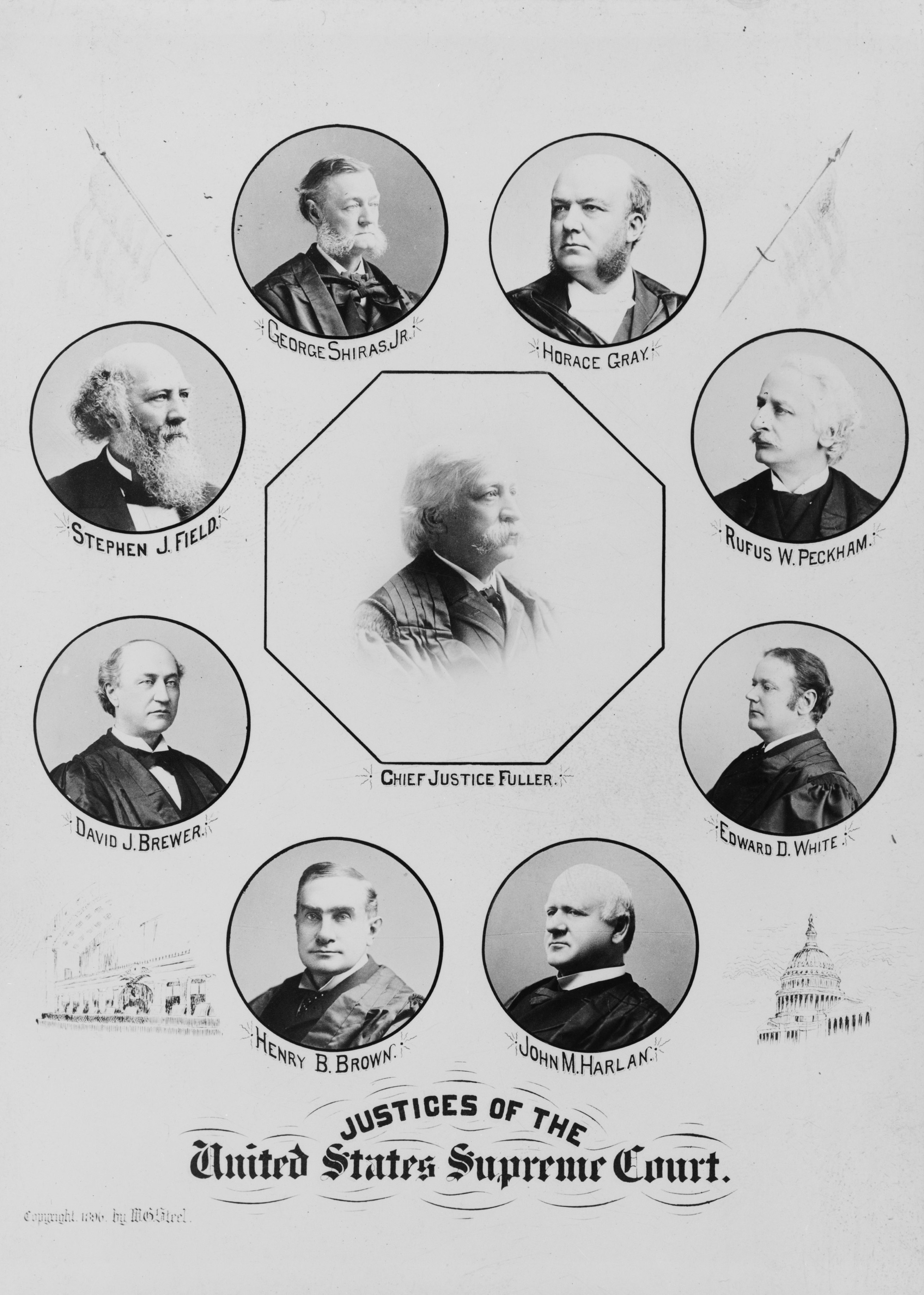
SCOTUS Justices 1896.

== Effects ==
=== United States v. Andrew Red Bird ===
Andrew Red Bird was arraigned on the charge of rape by the Rosebud Sioux Tribe Court. He was then sent on the District Court in South Dakota, and federal authorities were finally notified nearly a month after his arrest. One of the first things that the Court set out to determine was whether the tribe had the power to act in this situation. Even though this appeals court case took place in 2001 and 2002, Talton v. Mayes was referenced as one of the main prerequisites showing that the tribe had indeed had the power to act as they had, because their power was not derived from the Constitution, but rather was in existence before that. Red Bird ended up winning his case to suppress one of his statements made under unconstitutional circumstances, but the power of local government exercised by the Rosebud Sioux tribe was upheld based on Talton v. Mayes.

=== United States v. Wheeler ===
United States v. Wheeler included much the same storyline as United States v. Andrew Red Bird, with Talton v. Mayes playing the same role. Wheeler was also arraigned for rape, and Talton v. Mayes was again mentioned as the Justices tried to determine what the power of the local tribal government was.

Talton v. Mayes was also mentioned briefly either in the arguing or the decision making for several different cases, including United States v. Lara, Plains Commerce Bank v. Long Family Land & Cattle Co., Inc, and more....

=== Legislation ===
Talton v. Mayes also had an effect on legislation, most notably the Indian Civil Rights Act of 1968. While Talton v. Mayes did uphold the fact that the tribes were sovereign in their purely local affairs, it also said that while they were "possessed of . . . attributes of local self government, when exercising their tribal functions, all such rights are subject to the supreme legislative authority of the United States.” and that "Congress has plenary authority to limit, modify or eliminate the powers of local self-government which the tribes otherwise possess." Congress used that power to create the Indian Civil Rights Act, which forced Indian tribes to mimic the procedures of US courts in their judicial actions. While the Indian Civil Rights Act did not force the entire Constitution upon the Indians, it did include quite a few and forced the issue of plenary power, Congress using its abilities to control the way Indian justice is served.

== See also ==
- List of United States Supreme Court cases, volume 163

== Additional References ==
- Washburn, Wilcomb E. Red man's land/white man's law the past and present status of the American Indian. Norman: University of Oklahoma, 1995.
- Canby, William C. American Indian Law in a Nutshell. (Nutshell Series) (3rd ed) (Nutshell Series) New York: West Group, 1996.
- Duthu, N. Bruce. American Indians and the Law. The Penguin Library of American Indian History (Penguin's Library of American Indian History) New York: Viking Adult, 2008.
