= Higgins v. Keuffel =

- Supreme Court of the United States

Argued April 7–8, 1891 Decided May 11, 1891
- Full case name: Higgins v. Keuffel
- Citations: 140 U.S. 428 (more) 11 S. Ct. 731; 35 L. Ed. 470

Holding
- A label describing the contents of a container is not subject to copyright.

Court membership
- Chief Justice Melville Fuller Associate Justices Stephen J. Field · Joseph P. Bradley; John M. Harlan · Horace Gray; Samuel Blatchford · Lucius Q. C. Lamar II; David J. Brewer · Henry B. Brown

Case opinion
- Majority: Field, joined by unanimous

Higgins v. Keuffel, 140 U.S. 428 (1891), was a United States Supreme Court case in which the Court held a label describing the contents of a container is not subject to copyright.

The case has been read narrowly since it was decided. It applies to labels with "no artistic excellence."
