= United States v. Ball =

- Supreme Court of the United States

Argued March 2, 1896 Decided May 25, 1896
- Full case name: Millard Fillmore Ball, John C. Ball, and Robert E. Boutwel v. United States
- Citations: 163 U.S. 662 (more) 16 S. Ct. 1192; 41 L. Ed. 300

Case history
- Prior: In Error to the Circuit Court of the United States for the Eastern District of Texas

Holding
- A criminal conviction declared void on appeal does not count as a prosecution under the Double Jeopardy Clause.

Court membership
- Chief Justice Melville Fuller Associate Justices Stephen J. Field · John M. Harlan; Horace Gray · David J. Brewer; Henry B. Brown · George Shiras Jr. Edward D. White · Rufus W. Peckham

Case opinion
- Majority: Gray, joined by unanimous

Laws applied
- U.S. Const. amend. V

United States v. Ball, 163 U.S. 662 (1896), is a case in which the United States Supreme Court held that a criminal conviction declared void on appeal does not count as a prosecution under the Double Jeopardy Clause. It was one of the earliest Supreme Court cases interpreting the Double Jeopardy Clause.

In 1889, defendants Millard Fillmore Ball, John C. Ball, and Robert E. Boutwell were indicted for the murder of William T. Box. The jury acquitted Millard Fillmore Ball and convicted John C. Ball and Robert E. Boutwell. The convicted defendants appealed to the Supreme Court in Ball v. United States. The court reversed their convictions in 1891, holding that the indictment was insufficient. All three were indicted for the murder a second time. All three plead prior jeopardy. The trial court rejected all three pleas, and all three were convicted the second time.

On the second appeal, the Supreme Court reversed Millard Fillmore Ball's conviction. Departing from the common law rule of England, and from early decisions of the state supreme courts of New York and Massachusetts, the Court held that—under the Double Jeopardy Clause—the insufficiency of the first indictment could not remove the jeopardy bar of acquittal, as long as the first court had jurisdiction.

The court rejected John C. Ball and Robert E. Boutwell's double jeopardy arguments, holding that they could be retried after their prior convictions were reversed on appeal. The court also rejected their remaining arguments.
