= List of United States Supreme Court cases, volume 140 =

Supreme Court of the United States
- Interactive map of Supreme Court of the United States
- 38°53′26″N 77°00′16″W
- Established: March 4, 1789; 236 years ago
- Location: Washington, D.C.
- Coordinates: 38°53′26″N 77°00′16″W
- Composition method: Presidential nomination with Senate confirmation
- Authorised by: Constitution of the United States, Art. III, § 1
- Judge term length: life tenure, subject to impeachment and removal
- Number of positions: 9 (by statute)
- Website: supremecourt.gov

This is a list of cases reported in volume 140 of United States Reports, decided by the Supreme Court of the United States in 1891.

== Justices of the Supreme Court at the time of volume 140 U.S. ==
The Supreme Court is established by Article III, Section 1 of the Constitution of the United States, which says: "The judicial Power of the United States, shall be vested in one supreme Court . . .". The size of the Court is not specified; the Constitution leaves it to Congress to set the number of justices. Under the Judiciary Act of 1789 Congress originally fixed the number of justices at six (one chief justice and five associate justices). Since 1789 Congress has varied the size of the Court from six to seven, nine, ten, and back to nine justices (always including one chief justice).

When the cases in volume 140 U.S. were decided the Court comprised the following nine members:

Portrait	Justice	Office	Home State	Succeeded	Date confirmed by the Senate (Vote)	Tenure on Supreme Court
	Melville Fuller	Chief Justice	Illinois	Morrison Waite	July 20, 1888 (41–20)	October 8, 1888 – July 4, 1910 (Died)
	Stephen Johnson Field	Associate Justice	California	newly created seat	March 10, 1863 (Acclamation)	May 10, 1863 – December 1, 1897 (Retired)
	Joseph P. Bradley	Associate Justice	New Jersey	newly created seat	March 21, 1870 (46–9)	March 23, 1870 – January 22, 1892 (Died)
	John Marshall Harlan	Associate Justice	Kentucky	David Davis	November 29, 1877 (Acclamation)	December 10, 1877 – October 14, 1911 (Died)
	Horace Gray	Associate Justice	Massachusetts	Nathan Clifford	December 20, 1881 (51–5)	January 9, 1882 – September 15, 1902 (Died)
	Samuel Blatchford	Associate Justice	New York	Ward Hunt	March 22, 1882 (Acclamation)	April 3, 1882 – July 7, 1893 (Died)
	Lucius Quintus Cincinnatus Lamar	Associate Justice	Mississippi	William Burnham Woods	January 16, 1888 (32–28)	January 18, 1888 – January 23, 1893 (Died)
	David Josiah Brewer	Associate Justice	Kansas	Stanley Matthews	December 18, 1889 (53–11)	January 6, 1890 – March 28, 1910 (Died)
	Henry Billings Brown	Associate Justice	Michigan	Samuel Freeman Miller	December 29, 1890 (Acclamation)	January 5, 1891 – May 28, 1906 (Retired)

== Notable Case in 140 U.S. ==
=== In re Ross ===
In In re Ross, 140 U.S. 453 (1891), the Supreme Court held that, in countries in which the United States exercises extraterritorial jurisdiction, U.S. law is properly applied by U.S. consular courts to non-U.S.-citizen sailors on American-flagged ships.

== Citation style ==
Under the Judiciary Act of 1789 the federal court structure at the time comprised District Courts, which had general trial jurisdiction; Circuit Courts, which had mixed trial and appellate (from the US District Courts) jurisdiction; and the United States Supreme Court, which had appellate jurisdiction over the federal District and Circuit courts—and for certain issues over state courts. The Supreme Court also had limited original jurisdiction (i.e., in which cases could be filed directly with the Supreme Court without first having been heard by a lower federal or state court). There were one or more federal District Courts and/or Circuit Courts in each state, territory, or other geographical region.

The Judiciary Act of 1891 created the United States Courts of Appeals and reassigned the jurisdiction of most routine appeals from the district and circuit courts to these appellate courts. The Act created nine new courts that were originally known as the "United States Circuit Courts of Appeals." The new courts had jurisdiction over most appeals of lower court decisions. The Supreme Court could review either legal issues that a court of appeals certified or decisions of court of appeals by writ of certiorari.The change resulted in an immediate reduction in the Supreme Court's workload (from 623 cases filed in 1890 to 379 in 1891 and 275 in 1892).

Bluebook citation style is used for case names, citations, and jurisdictions.

- "# Cir." = United States Court of Appeals
  - e.g., "3d Cir." = United States Court of Appeals for the Third Circuit
- "C.C.D." = United States Circuit Court for the District of . . .
  - e.g.,"C.C.D.N.J." = United States Circuit Court for the District of New Jersey
- "D." = United States District Court for the District of . . .
  - e.g.,"D. Mass." = United States District Court for the District of Massachusetts
- "E." = Eastern; "M." = Middle; "N." = Northern; "S." = Southern; "W." = Western
  - e.g.,"C.C.S.D.N.Y." = United States Circuit Court for the Southern District of New York
  - e.g.,"M.D. Ala." = United States District Court for the Middle District of Alabama
- "Ct. Cl." = United States Court of Claims
- The abbreviation of a state's name alone indicates the highest appellate court in that state's judiciary at the time.
  - e.g.,"Pa." = Supreme Court of Pennsylvania
  - e.g.,"Me." = Supreme Judicial Court of Maine

== List of cases in volume 140 U.S. ==
Case Name	Page & year	Opinion of the Court	Concurring opinion(s)	Dissenting opinion(s)	Lower court	Disposition
Pennoyer v. McConnaughy	1 (1891)	Lamar	none	none	C.C.D. Or.	affirmed
Henderson v. Carbondale C. & C. Co.	25 (1891)	Brewer	none	none	C.C.S.D. Ill.	multiple
Scotland Cnty. v. United States ex rel. Hill	41 (1891)	Harlan	none	none	C.C.E.D. Mo.	affirmed
Stevenson v. Barbour	48 (1891)	Fuller	none	none	not indicated	affirmed
Hill v. Chicago & E.R.R. Co.	52 (1891)	Field	none	none	C.C.N.D. Ill.	affirmed
International T.C. Co. v. Gaylord	55 (1891)	Brown	none	none	C.C.D. Conn.	affirmed
Illinois G.T. Ry Co. v. Wade	65 (1891)	Brewer	none	none	C.C.N.D. Ill.	affirmed
Harper Cnty. v. Rose	71 (1891)	Lamar	none	none	C.C.D. Kan.	affirmed
Aetna Life Ins. Co. v. Ward	76 (1891)	Lamar	none	none	C.C.D.N.J.	affirmed
In re Washington & G.R.R. Co.	91 (1891)	Blatchford	none	none	Sup. Ct. D.C.	mandamus granted
Hughes v. Dundee Mortg. Co.	98 (1891)	Gray	none	none	C.C.D. Or.	affirmed
Scott v. Neely	106 (1891)	Field	none	none	N.D. Miss.	reversed
Birdseye v. Shaeffer	117 (1891)	per curiam	none	none	C.C.W.D. Tex.	dismissed
Ball v. United States	118 (1891)	Fuller	none	none	C.C.E.D. Tex.	reversed
Manning v. Amy	137 (1891)	Lamar	none	none	Mass. Super. Ct.	affirmed
United States v. Ewing	142 (1891)	Brown	none	none	E.D. Tenn.	vacated
United States v. McDermott	151 (1891)	Brown	none	none	C.C.D. Ky.	vacated
United States v. Poinier	160 (1891)	Brown	none	none	D.S.C.	vacated
United States v. Van Duzee I	169 (1891)	Brown	none	none	N.D. Iowa	reversed
United States v. Barber	177 (1891)	Brown	none	none	M.D. Ala.	reversed
Cluett v. Claflin	180 (1891)	Brown	none	none	C.C.S.D.N.Y.	affirmed
Cluett v. McNeany	183 (1891)	per curiam	none	none	C.C.S.D.N.Y.	affirmed
St. Paul P.W. v. Starling	184 (1891)	Blatchford	none	none	C.C.D. Minn.	affirmed
United States v. Van Duzee II	199 (1891)	Brown	none	none	N.D. Iowa	reversed
In re Claasen	200 (1891)	Blatchford	none	none	C.C.S.D.N.Y.	mandamus denied
Kneeland v. Lawrence	209 (1891)	Lamar	none	none	C.C.D. Ind.	affirmed
Dwight v. Merritt	213 (1891)	Lamar	none	none	C.C.S.D.N.Y.	affirmed
Uniontown Bank v. Mackey	220 (1891)	Gray	none	none	C.C.D. Ind.	reversed
Equitable L.A. Soc'y v. Clements	226 (1891)	Gray	none	none	C.C.W.D. Mo.	affirmed
Block v. Darling	234 (1891)	Harlan	none	none	C.C.D. Ky.	affirmed
Mullan v. United States	240 (1891)	Harlan	none	none	Ct. Cl.	affirmed
Woodward v. Jewell	247 (1891)	Brewer	none	none	C.C.S.D. Ga.	multiple
Reynolds v. Stockton	254 (1891)	Brewer	none	none	N.J. Chan.	affirmed
Halsted v. Buster	273 (1891)	Brewer	none	none	D.W. Va.	affirmed
In re Wood	278 (1891)	Harlan	Field	none	C.C.S.D.N.Y.	affirmed
In re Shibuya Jugiro	291 (1891)	Harlan	none	none	C.C.S.D.N.Y.	affirmed
Rogers v. Durant	298 (1891)	Fuller	none	none	C.C.N.D. Ill.	affirmed
Humphreys v. McKissock	304 (1891)	Field	none	none	C.C.S.D. Iowa	reversed
Lent v. Tillson	316 (1891)	Harlan	none	none	Cal.	affirmed
Essex Pub. Road Bd. v. Skinkle	334 (1891)	Fuller	none	none	N.J. Sup. Ct.	affirmed
Marsh v. Nichols, Shepard & Co.	344 (1891)	Fuller	none	none	Mich. Cir. Ct.	dismissed
The E.A. Packer	360 (1891)	Brown	none	none	C.C.S.D.N.Y.	reversed
Hardin v. Jordan	371 (1891)	Bradley	none	Brewer	C.C.N.D. Ill.	reversed
Mitchell v. Smale	406 (1891)	Bradley	none	Brewer	C.C.N.D. Ill.	reversed
Quock Ting v. United States	417 (1891)	Field	none	Brewer	C.C.N.D. Cal.	affirmed
Wan Shing v. United States	424 (1891)	Field	none	none	C.C.N.D. Cal.	affirmed
Higgins v. Keuffel	428 (1891)	Field	none	none	C.C.S.D.N.Y.	affirmed
Gleeson v. Virginia Midland Ry. Co.	435 (1891)	Lamar	none	Brewer	Sup. Ct. D.C.	reversed
Lewisburg Bank v. Sheffey	445 (1891)	Fuller	none	none	D.W. Va.	affirmed
In re Ross	453 (1891)	Field	none	none	C.C.N.D.N.Y.	affirmed
Clark Thread Co. v. Willimantic Linen Co.	481 (1891)	Bradley	none	none	C.C.D.N.J.	reversed
Albright v. Oyster	493 (1891)	Lamar	none	none	C.C.E.D. Mo.	affirmed
Marchand v. Griffon	516 (1891)	Lamar	none	none	C.C.E.D. La.	affirmed
Williams v. Heard	529 (1891)	Lamar	none	none	Mass.	reversed
In re Rahrer	545 (1891)	Fuller	none	none	C.C.D. Kan.	reversed
Insurance Co. of N.A. v. Hibernia Ins. Co.	565 (1891)	Gray	none	none	C.C.E.D. La.	reversed
In re Wilson	575 (1891)	Brewer	none	none	Dist. Ct. Terr. Ariz.	habeas corpus denied
In re Delgado	586 (1891)	Brewer	none	none	Sup. Ct. Terr. N.M.	affirmed
Kneeland v. Bass Foundry M.W.	592 (1891)	Lamar	none	none	C.C.D. Ind.	affirmed
United States v. Dalles Mil. Road Co.	599 (1891)	Blatchford	none	none	C.C.D. Or.	reversed
Martin v. Barbour	634 (1891)	Blatchford	none	none	C.C.E.D. Ark.	affirmed
Chicago Distilling Co. v. Stone	647 (1891)	Bradley	none	none	C.C.N.D. Ill.	reversed
City of New Orleans v. Louisiana Constr. Co.	654 (1891)	Gray	none	none	C.C.E.D. La.	reversed
Church of J.C. of L.D.S. v. United States	665 (1891)	Bradley	none	none	Sup. Ct. Terr. Utah	affirmed as modified
