= Ward v. Race Horse =

- Supreme Court of the United States

Argued March 11–12, 1896 Decided May 25, 1896
- Full case name: Ward v. Race Horse
- Citations: 163 U.S. 504 (more) 16 S. Ct. 1076; 41 L. Ed. 244

Court membership
- Chief Justice Melville Fuller Associate Justices Stephen J. Field · John M. Harlan; Horace Gray · David J. Brewer; Henry B. Brown · George Shiras Jr. Edward D. White · Rufus W. Peckham

Case opinions
- Majority: White, joined by Fuller, Field, Harlan, Gray, Shiras, Peckham
- Dissent: Brown
- Brewer took no part in the consideration or decision of the case.
- Overruled by
- Minnesota v. Mille Lacs Band of Chippewa Indians (1999, in part); Herrera v. Wyoming (2019, in full)

Ward v. Race Horse, 163 U.S. 504 (1896), is a United States Supreme Court case argued on March 11–12, 1896, and decided on May 25, 1896. The case concerned the right of the Bannock people to hunt on unoccupied land per an 1868 treaty with the U.S. The case was decided in favor of the state of Wyoming and set a precedent that state laws had precedence over Indian treaties, massively checking tribal sovereignty and giving the Supreme Court the right to determine Congress’s implicit intentions when signing Indian Treaties. The case influenced many twentieth century cases dealing with hunting rights, conservation, and state’s rights and the precedent it set wasn’t overturned until 2019 in Herrera v. Wyoming.

== Background ==
Race Horse occurred during a time when Wyoming was being rapidly settled by white pioneers. Before the 1840s, the land that belonged to the Shoshone Nation stretched across Idaho, Wyoming, eastern Oregon and California, Nevada and northern Utah. The lands were crossed by the Oregon and California Trails, but no significant white populations settled in the area with the exception of the Mormons moving into Utah. Once the Gold Rush hit, however, people began to pour in. There was significant amounts of violence between white settlers and the Natives whose land they were encroaching on and so the U.S. Department of the Interior began to pursue treaties with the Shoshone-Bannock tribes of what is now southeast Idaho and Wyoming. Not long before treaty negotiations were to start the massacre at Bear Lake took place. In January of 1863, a company of 250 soldiers, returning from fighting Natives in California, surrounded the winter camps of the Northwestern Shoshone and viciously attacked them, killing 224 Shoshone. After this, the Northwestern Shoshone Band never fought directly with the U.S. again.

That same year, in 1863, the Shoshone-Bannock tribes signed the first Fort Bridger Treaty, allocating them a 44 million acre reservation and a promise of “ten thousand dollars worth of food and supplies annually for twenty years.” However, most of these supplies never arrived. In 1868, the second Fort Bridger Treaty was signed (ratified by the Senate in 1869) that became the basis for Race Horse. It ceded a large portion of the 44 million acres allocated to the Shoshone-Bannock tribes in 1863. Importantly, Article 4 of the treaty stated that the Shoshone-Bannock retained the right to hunt the lands off of the reservation as long as they were “unoccupied,” populated by game, and there was generally peace between whites and Indians. This condition was incredibly important. Internationally, it was very common for Native tribes to retain hunting right on lands they ceded per the Aboriginal Title. This right is not alienable or heritable by individuals and protects a communal right to land on which traditional economy – like hunting and fishing – is practiced. The right is passed down through generations, but is also heavily debated in courts. In the case of the Shoshone-Bannock the elk hunting they engaged in was both an ancient practice connecting them to the land and absolutely necessary for subsistence.

In the early 1890s, elk populations were declining due mostly to loss of habitat. After gaining statehood in 1890, Wyoming passed a laws to restrict hunting to certain seasons and generally limit elk hunting. Blame was placed on Natives over hunting elk, but around Jackson Hole, Wyoming, the Bannock tribes were not the only ones hunting. The white settlers and the officials associated with the newly established Yellowstone National Park repeatedly accused the natives of overhunting and wasting elk. However, it was the white settlers who hunted elk for pleasure and often their meat would spoil in the winter because they didn’t know how to properly store it. For example, in 1901 a party of eight pleasure hunters, led by two guides, killed 59 elk in one excursion, more than they could possibly use. In 1895, after filing numerous complaints about Native hunting with the Department of the Interior -- who maintained that they were unfounded -- the Jackson Hole constable started arresting Bannocks for hunting elk, hoping to drive them back into their reservation. In the Summer of 1895, the constable and a party of deputies arrested a group of twenty–odd Bannocks. He confiscated their meat, ration checks, and hunting pass, which meant that upon return to the reservation they would have nothing to eat. Most of them ended up escaping, fearing another massacre, one young boy was killed and a few arrested. This incident was part of a larger conflict known as the Bannock War of 1895, which was a conflict that was minimally violent and definitely not a war, but was exaggerated by the press who were capitalizing on fears of violent Indians. Soon after, Indian Service Inspector, Province McCormick, arrived to sort out the situation. He decided to set up a test case where Bannock man John Race Horse Sr., who admitted to killing seven elk, would be tried and his case would set a precedent for the nation. The Indian Service filed a writ of habeas corpus to take the case straight to a U.S. Circuit Court. The expectation was that the case would be decided in favor of Race Horse and the Bannocks and resolve conflict over hunting and treaty rights for the rest of the nation.

== Supreme Court decision ==
When the case went to the Supreme Court, they ruled for Wyoming 7-1, with Justice Edward D. White authoring the lead opinion and Henry B. Brown dissenting. The 1868 Fort Bridger Treaty that established the Fort Hall Reservation stated that “they [the Bannock Indians] shall have the right to hunt upon the unoccupied lands of the United States so long as game may be found thereon,” but the court opinion says that this “does not give them the right to exercise this privilege within the limits of that state in violation of its laws.” Race Horse’s killing of the elk was against Wyoming state law and so Wyoming won because of the equal-footing doctrine. This doctrine “ requires that all states newly admitted to the Union after the thirteen original states be admitted with the same rights and sovereignty at the time of admission as the original states.” The Race Horse decision states that because the act that made Wyoming a state in 1890 “contains no exception or reservation in favor of or for the benefit of Indians,” state hunting regulations were superior in authority to a treaty. It additionally stipulates that when Congress ratified the treaty it was with the assumption that wilderness “was destined to be occupied and settled by the white man.” This assertion that the land was destined to be settled is clear in the majority opinion of the Court that stated that hunting off-reservation was a “temporary privilege” that was not guaranteed in perpetuity by a treaty. The right, according to the Court, becomes restricted once settlement increases. This is a sense of ownership that appears in nineteenth century settler colonial belief in manifest destiny and in the case Johnson v. McIntosh (1823) that claimed for the United States ownership of all “‘discovered’ Indian lands” and designated Natives as “occupants” only.

=== Lead opinion ===
The reasoning behind Justice White's lead opinion is contentious for various reasons. The main issue is that the Supreme Court repudiated the treaty based on the implicit intentions of Congress at the time of the signing and without the consent of the tribal participants, when many interpretations of constitutional treaty rights require both parties’ consent for modification. This assumption valued state law over a federal treaty which is in direct contradiction of the Supremacy Clause in the U.S. Constitution that names federal laws and treaties as “the supreme Law of the Land.” However, none of the thirteen original states in the union had complete authority over Indian affairs or treaties, due to the Supremacy and Commerce Clauses of the Constitution. White based his opinion on his own interpretation of the language in the Fort Bridger Treaty, not on the intention and interpretation of the Shoshone-Bannock who signed it. This created a conflict between state creation and treaty rights that had not previously existed. The leading opinion also characterizes hunting for food as a right “given” to the Shoshone-Bannock people, despite it being something that had always been done. Additionally, the Federal Government had not held up their side of the treaty that promised food and supplies annually until 1888 (twenty years after the signing of the 1868 treaty) which led to widespread malnourishment on the reservation. Justice White also determined a definition for the term “unoccupied” based on his own interpretation of the word.

== Subsequent developments ==
The Race Horse decision made a large impact. The case and the precedent it set for a hundred years made the land claims of sovereign tribes are inferior to those of the United States. According to the case, land is subject to confiscation and treaty rights are subject to the ruling of the courts which “effectively leaves tribes without any substantive protection from the very government branches legally and morally charged with protecting and enforcing indigenous rights.”

=== Crow Tribe of Indians v. Repsis ===
In 1994, in the case Crow Tribe of Indians v. Repsis the 10th Circuit Court of Appeals ruled against an Apsáalooke (the name for the Crow in their language) man, Thomas L. Ten Bear, who had killed an elk. The case illustrated that Race Horse and the equal-footing doctrine still held up. Ten Bear was exercising his right to hunt on unoccupied land as stipulated in a 1868 Treaty with the Apsáalooke. He was charged with the illegal killing of an elk in Wyoming’s Bighorn National Forest. The tribe appealed multiple times. First, the district court ruled against the Apsáalooke, claiming that the legal issue had already been addressed in Race Horse which, according to the decision, factually matched the Ten Bear case. The ruling was appealed, but the 10th Circuit Court of Appeals reaffirmed Race Horse again, saying that it contained all the facts necessary to rule against Ten Bear, despite the Ten Bear case being about a different tribe and a different treaty. The court explicitly supported the equal footing doctrine, which by the 1990s was widely discredited, by agreeing with Justice White that hunting rights were temporary.

=== Minnesota v. Mille Lacs Band of Chippewa Indians (1999) ===
The Mille Lacs case partially overturned Race Horse, by reaffirming Native land use rights under treaties over state regulation of fishing and hunting. Mille Lacs also affirmed that state sovereignty, particularly over natural resources, and Native treaty rights aren’t in opposition as Race Horse said they were. The case references an 1837 treaty between the Mille Lacs Band of Chippewa Indians and the U.S. that ceded land to the U.S. in exchange for twenty years of annual payments of food and money and the rights to hunt on the ceded land. The hunting rights applied “during the pleasure of the President of the United States.” The case also references an 1850 executive order by President Taylor that removed hunting rights on the ceded lands, but the order was ineffective and quickly abandoned. Finally, the case looks at an 1855 treaty that established the Mille Lacs Lake Reservation and does not specifically mention hunting or fishing rights or the 1837 treaty. Similar to the situation in Race Horse, Minnesota joined the union after the treaty (1858) and the Mille Lacs Band dealt with increased state regulation of fishing and hunting because of growth in sportfishing tourism.

The case was a culmination of efforts by the Mille Lacs Band to resolve conflict over fishing rights with the Minnesota Department of Natural Resources (DNR) that started in the 1980s. When the negotiations failed in the early 1990s, the issue went to the district court. The court ruled that the Mille Lacs Band kept property and hunting rights per the 1837 treaty. It found the 1850 executive order unlawful because the removal did not have congressional approval. The 1855 treaty was found to not affect hunting or fishing rights and Minnesota’s admission to the union did not remove Native rights to use of property. The case went to the Supreme Court who ruled five-to-four that the Mille Lacs Band retained their hunting rights. The ruling rejected the precedent set in Ward v. Race Horse by saying that the act admitting Minnesota to the union did not end any treaty rights because there was no clear intent in the act. According to this decision, language that put Minnesota on “equal footing” did not extinguish these rights because treaty rights and state sovereignty over conservation and natural resources are “reconcilable.” The court also overturned the finding that treaty rights, as stated in Race Horse, are “temporary.” This was a rejection of the precedent set by Race Horse, but not a full overturning.

=== Herrera v. Wyoming (2019) ===
The Mille Lacs case gave the Crow Tribe an opening to argue for their hunting rights in accordance with their 1868 treaty and challenge the result of Repsis. In Herrera v. Wyoming, Apsáalooke man, Clayvin Herrera, was charged by the state of Wyoming for hunting elk without a license in the Bighorn National Forest. Herrera argued that the 1868 treaty gave him the right to hunt on unoccupied land while the state of Wyoming argued with the same reasoning as the Repsis case. The case went to the Supreme Court and the reasoning from Mille Lacs, which nullified the result of the Race Horse and Repsis cases, held. The court ruled five-to-four for Herrera. Essentially, the court said that because Wyoming’s statehood was not listed in the 1868 treaty as a reason for termination of hunting rights, admission to the union did not overturn these rights. Further, the court overturned Justice White’s interpretation of “unoccupied” as expressed in Race Horse. Based on the context surrounding the writing of the treaty, “unoccupied” was found to “denote an area free of residence or settlement by non-Indians.” This was the understanding that the Apsáalooke would have had of the word when the treaty was signed, not that federal control of an area rendered it occupied. The case affirmed that state governments cannot waive treaty agreements between tribes and the federal government.
