= In re Ross =

- Supreme Court of the United States

Argued April 30 – May 1, 1891 Decided May 25, 1891
- Full case name: Ross v. McIntyre, Superintendent of the Penitentiary of the State of New York at Albany
- Citations: 140 U.S. 453 (more) 11 S. Ct. 897; 35 L. Ed. 581; 1891 U.S. LEXIS 2479

Holding
- A vessel being American is evidence that a seaman on board is such.

Court membership
- Chief Justice Melville Fuller Associate Justices Stephen J. Field · Joseph P. Bradley; John M. Harlan · Horace Gray; Samuel Blatchford · Lucius Q. C. Lamar II; David J. Brewer · Henry B. Brown

Case opinion
- Majority: Field, joined by unanimous

In re Ross, or Ross v. McIntyre, 140 U.S. 453 (1891), was a US Supreme Court case decided on May 21, 1891, that dealt with the application of American law by US consular courts over foreign sailors on American-flagged ships in countries in which the United States exercised extraterritorial jurisdiction.

== Background ==
John M. Ross, a Canadian sailor on the American ship Bullion, was convicted in the US consular court in Yokohama, Japan of murder on the ship while it was in that city before the US consul general at Kanagawa, Thomas van Buren. Ross was sentenced to death, but US President Rutherford B. Hayes commuted the sentence to a life sentence of hard labor at Albany Penitentiary.

Although Ross accepted the commutation, he later sought a writ of habeas corpus for his release on the grounds that having been born on Prince Edward Island, he was a British subject and so was not subject to the jurisdiction of a US consular court.

== Decision ==
The Supreme Court upheld the jurisdiction of the court on the basis that having enrolled on a US ship, Ross became subject to the jurisdiction of US courts.

== See also ==
- List of United States Supreme Court cases, volume 140
