= Minnesota v. Mille Lacs Band of Chippewa Indians =

- Supreme Court of the United States

Argued December 2, 1998 Decided March 24, 1999
- Full case name: State of Minnesota et al. v. Mille Lacs Band of Chippewa Indians et al.
- Citations: 526 U.S. 172 (more) 119 S.Ct. 1187; 143 L. Ed. 2d 270; 67 USLW 4189; 29 Envtl. L. Rep. 20,557; 99 Cal. Daily Op. Serv. 2104; 1999 Daily Journal D.A.R. 2735; 12 Fla. L. Weekly Fed. S 162

Case history
- Prior: 861 F. Supp. 784 (D. Minn. 1994), aff'd, 124 F.3d 904 (8th Cir. 1997), cert. granted, 524 U.S. 915 (1998).

Holding
- The Ojibwe (Chippewa) retain usufructuary rights on the lands they ceded to the federal government in 1837.

Court membership
- Chief Justice William Rehnquist Associate Justices John P. Stevens · Sandra Day O'Connor; Antonin Scalia · Anthony Kennedy; David Souter · Clarence Thomas; Ruth Bader Ginsburg · Stephen Breyer

Case opinions
- Majority: O'Connor, joined by Stevens, Souter, Ginsburg, Breyer
- Dissent: Rehnquist, joined by Scalia, Kennedy, Thomas
- Dissent: Thomas

Minnesota v. Mille Lacs Band of Chippewa Indians, 526 U.S. 172 (1999), was a United States Supreme Court decision concerning the usufructuary rights of the Ojibwe (Chippewa) tribe to certain lands it had ceded to the federal government in 1837. The Court ruled that the Ojibwe retained certain hunting, fishing, and gathering rights on the ceded land.

== Background ==
Under the authority of the Treaty of St. Peters of 1837 (7 Stat. 536), also known as the "White Pine Treaty," the Ojibwe (Chippewa) Nations ceded a vast tract of lands stretching from what now is north-central Wisconsin to east-central Minnesota. Article 5 of the treaty states, "The privilege of hunting, fishing, and gathering the wild rice, upon the lands, the rivers and the lakes included in the territory ceded, is guaranteed to the Indians, during the pleasure of the President of the United States."

The states of Michigan, Minnesota, and Wisconsin were later formed from various ceded territories, including the large tract from the White Pine Treaty. The government officials of these states asserted authority over hunting and fishing rights without regard for the treaty rights reserved by the Ojibwe.

From the 1960s to the 1990s, various bands of Ojibwe attempted to reassert their fishing rights on the Great Lakes. Those who did so were commonly arrested or harassed. This led to a series of lawsuits and protracted legal battles in each of the three states. The conflict culminated in the U.S. Supreme Court decision Minnesota v. Mille Lacs (1999).

== Decision ==
The Court affirmed the rights of the Ojibwe to hunt, fish, and gather on the lands ceded by treaty, contingent upon a set of guidelines to protect the Great Lakes fisheries. This decision is an important victory for proponents of Native American sovereignty.

== See also ==
- List of United States Supreme Court cases, volume 526
- List of United States Supreme Court cases
- Lists of United States Supreme Court cases by volume
- Wisconsin Walleye War
