= Bannock War of 1895 =

Civil unrest in Wyoming, United States

- Part of the American Indian Wars
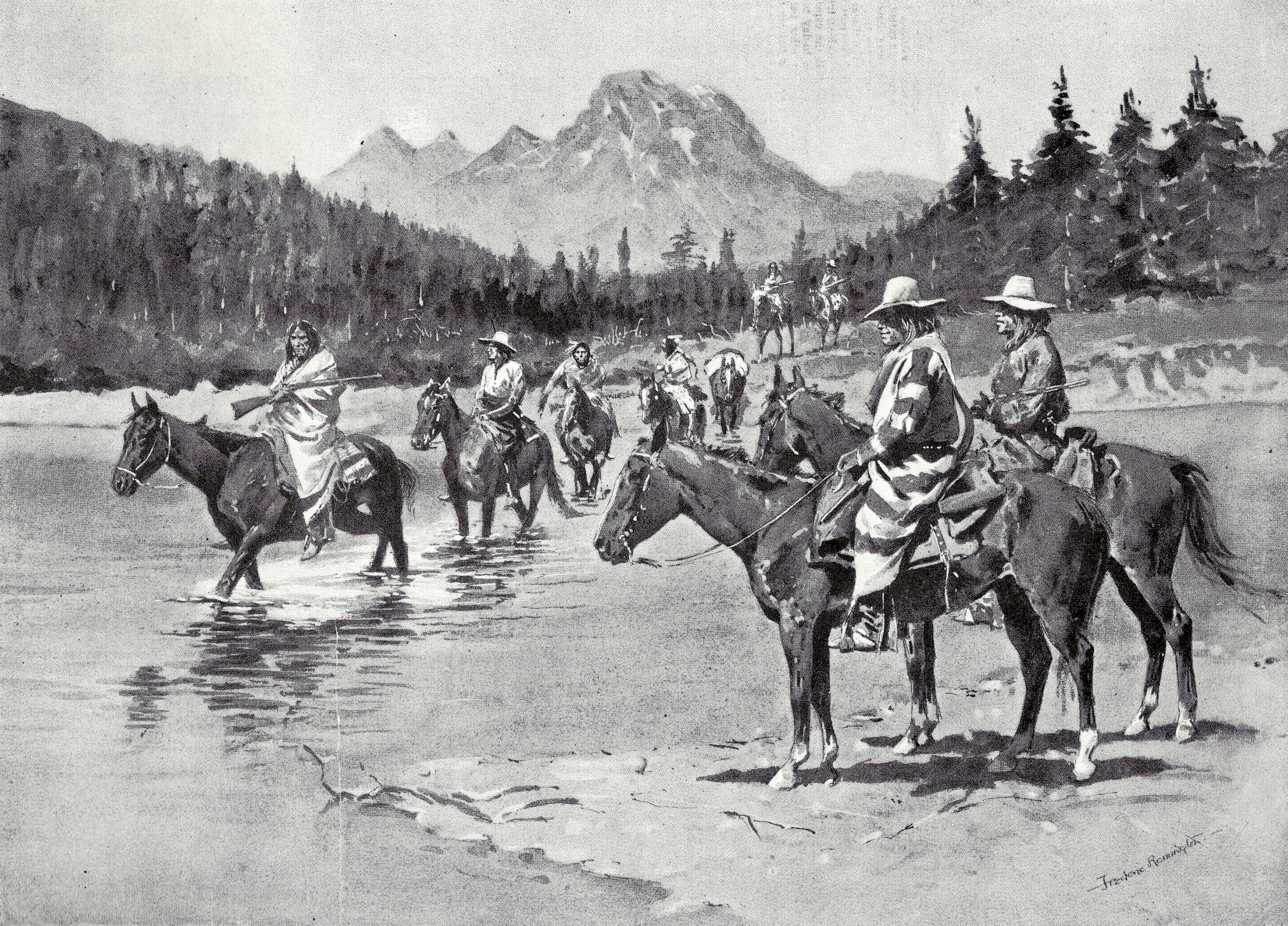
- Recent Uprising Among the Bannock Indians. A Hunting Party Fording the Snake River Southwest of the Three Tetons.
Date	1895
Location	Jackson Hole, Wyoming
Result	United States victory

Belligerents
United States	Bannock

Casualties and losses
None	1 killed

This event should not be confused with the Bannock War of 1878.

The Bannock War of 1895, or the Bannock Uprising, refers to a minor conflict centered in Jackson Hole, Wyoming, in the United States. During the early 1890s, Wyoming passed a state law prohibiting the killing of elk for their teeth, which led to the arrests of several Bannock hunters in 1895. The arrests and the death of one Bannock created wildly exaggerated rumors that the natives would revolt; at one point, the Eastern press reported that the Bannocks had massacred a large group of settlers in Jackson Hole. In response, the United States Army launched an expedition into the area- when troops arrived, it was found that the situation was peaceful and that the fears of uprising were unjustified.

== Conflict ==
In the late 1800s elk populations in and around Jackson Hole declined. Fears arose that elk would become extinct due to poaching. By 1895, Jackson Hole was becoming a popular destination for big game hunters who felt the local Bannock hunters were interfering with their sport. Elk was a main food source for the Bannocks, who lived on Fort Hall Reservation across the border in Idaho, and whose treaty guaranteed a right to hunt "unoccupied lands." In July 1895 a party of Bannock hunters was arrested for poaching by a posse of 27 men led by Constable William Manning. As they were marching back to town, the deputies all suddenly loaded their rifles. Concerned that they would be killed, the Bannocks escaped. In the melee, an infant was swept off his mother's back, and never found. An elderly, unarmed, nearly blind Bannock was shot four times in the back. Justice of the Peace Frank H. Rhodes, in a telegraph report to the Wyoming governor, said; "Nine Indians arrested, one killed, others escaped. Many Indians reported here: threaten lives and property. Settlers are moving their families away. Want protection immediately. Action on your part is absolutely necessary."

Once news of the incident reached the public, exaggerated reports made their way to the East Coast, where a New York newspaper claimed that all of the settlers in Jackson's Hole had been massacred by the Bannocks. The headline on July 27 of the Maryland newspaper "Baltimore Morning Herald" read: "Butchered by Bannocks - An Awful Massacre at Jackson's Hole. - TROOPS ARE TOO LATE. - Men, Women and Children Killed. - NOT ONE ESCAPED." The newspaper went on to say that "[t]here is no doubt that the redskins have fired every home and cabin and by morning they will be repeating their work [in Idaho]." The source for the claim was three fishermen who said that "every man, woman and child in Jackson's Hole [was] murdered." In an earlier article the "Baltimore Morning Herald" stated that their source, a mail carrier from Star Valley, said that the Bannocks had blocked off the passes leading into Jackson Hole and that the residents within the area were all fleeing for their lives. In response to these claims, the United States Army sent troops into the region with orders to occupy Jackson.

Most were unable to traverse Teton Pass, but one company of Buffalo Soldiers managed to descend the slopes on their wagons with ropes. However, when the soldiers entered they found no Bannocks, no dead citizens or fires, proving that the whole situation was far different from what the newspapers were reporting. The Indian agent at Fort Hall telegraphed the following; "All Indians absent from reservation has returned. Had big council. Requested me to telegraph you their hearts felt good. Had not harmed a white man, and would start haying, leaving their grievances to the justice of the white man."

In the subsequent investigation, the United States Indian Service arranged for a test case regarding the Bannocks' treaty-reserved off-reservation hunting rights. A Bannock hunter named Race Horse was arrested for poaching, and taken to the District Court in Evanston (Jackson Hole was then in Uinta County, of which Evanston was the county seat). A habeas corpus case, Ward v. Race Horse, was then filed for his release. The case then went to the Supreme Court, which concluded that Wyoming statehood invalidated Bannock hunting rights. This decision was repudiated in the 2019 Supreme Court decision Herrera v. Wyoming.

== See also ==
- Battle of Kelley Creek
- Bering Sea Anti-Poaching Operations
