= Ball v. United States =

- Supreme Court of the United States

Decided April 27, 1891
- Full case name: Ball v. United States
- Citations: 140 U.S. 118 (more)

Holding
- An indictment for murder is fatally defective if it fails to state the place of death or, if filed more than a year after the death, the time of death.

Court membership
- Chief Justice Melville Fuller Associate Justices Stephen J. Field · Joseph P. Bradley; John M. Harlan · Horace Gray; Samuel Blatchford · Lucius Q. C. Lamar II; David J. Brewer · Henry B. Brown

Ball v. United States, 140 U.S. 118 (1891), was a United States Supreme Court case in which the court held that an indictment for murder is fatally defective if it fails to state the place of death or, if filed more than a year after the death, the time of death.

== Background ==
In 1889, defendants Millard Fillmore Ball, John C. Ball, and Robert E. Boutwell were indicted for the murder of William T. Box. The jury acquitted Millard Fillmore Ball and convicted John C. Ball and Robert E. Boutwell. The charging documents did not include the location of the murder or the time of death, among other issues that Ball and Boutwell objected to as deficiencies.

== Opinion of the court ==
The Supreme Court issued an opinion on April 27, 1891.

== Subsequent developments ==
After the conviction was declared void, the charges were refiled against Bell with the particulars of the murder properly state. Bell was convicted again. Bell appealed this as a violation of the Double Jeopardy Clause. In 1897, the case returned to the Supreme Court in United States v. Ball, in which the court held that it was not a violation of that clause.
