= Herrera v. Wyoming =

United States Supreme Court case regarding Indian hunting rights

- Supreme Court of the United States

Argued January 8, 2019 Decided May 20, 2019
- Full case name: Clayvin Herrera v. Wyoming
- Docket no.: 17-532
- Citations: 587 U.S. 329 (more) 139 S. Ct. 1686; 203 L. Ed. 2d 846
- Decision: Opinion

Case history
- Prior: Cert. granted, 138 S. Ct. 2707 (2018).

Court membership
- Chief Justice John Roberts Associate Justices Clarence Thomas · Ruth Bader Ginsburg; Stephen Breyer · Samuel Alito; Sonia Sotomayor · Elena Kagan; Neil Gorsuch · Brett Kavanaugh

Case opinions
- Majority: Sotomayor, joined by Ginsburg, Breyer, Kagan, Gorsuch
- Dissent: Alito, joined by Roberts, Thomas, Kavanaugh
- This case overturned a previous ruling or rulings
- Ward v. Race Horse (1896)

Herrera v. Wyoming, 587 U.S. 329 (2019), was a United States Supreme Court case in which the Court held that Wyoming's statehood did not void the Crow Tribe's right to hunt on "unoccupied lands of the United States" under an 1868 treaty, and that the Bighorn National Forest did not automatically become "occupied" when the forest was created.

== Background ==
In January 2014 Clayvin Herrera, a member of the Crow Tribe of Indians, along with several other members of his tribe, followed a group of Rocky Mountain elk from the Crow reservation in Montana into Bighorn National Forest in Wyoming. There, they shot three elk, taking them home for food. Wyoming officials cited Herrera and his companions for hunting out of season, a violation of state law.

Herrera's two companions both pleaded guilty to the poaching charges and paid the fines that Wyoming imposed. Herrera, however, argued that their hunt was lawful, citing the Treaty of Fort Laramie, which allowed them to hunt on "unoccupied lands".

Wyoming disagreed, arguing that Herrera's claim had been invalidated by the Supreme Court 120 years prior, in Ward v. Race Horse. There, the Court held that Wyoming's admission into the Union had superseded the rights of Indians to hunt there, because it had joined the Union "on the same footing" as the other states, giving it control over the natural resources within its border.

== Case ==
The Supreme Court accepted the case to answer the question:

Did Wyoming's admission to the Union or the establishment of the Bighorn National Forest abrogate the Crow Tribe of Indians' 1868 federal treaty right to hunt on the "unoccupied lands of the United States," thereby permitting the present-day conviction of a Crow member who engaged in subsistence hunting for his family?

In a 5 to 4 decision, the split Court ruled that Wyoming's admission did not abrogate the Indians' rights. The majority opinion was authored by Sotomayor, joined by Ginsburg, Breyer, Kagan, and Gorsuch. The dissent was authored by Alito, joined by Roberts, Thomas, and Kavanaugh.
