= Matthias F. Cowley =

American Mormon leader (1845–1940)

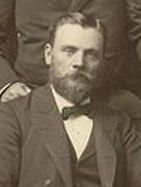

Quorum of the Twelve Apostles
- October 7, 1897 – October 28, 1905
- End reason: Resigned from Quorum because of Cowley's opposition to church's stance on plural marriage

LDS Church Apostle
- October 7, 1897 – May 11, 1911
- Reason: Removal of Moses Thatcher from Quorum of the Twelve; death of Abraham H. Cannon
- End reason: Priesthood suspended because of Cowley's opposition to church's stance on plural marriage
- Reorganization at end of term: No apostles ordained

Personal details
- Born: Matthias Foss Cowley; August 25, 1858; Salt Lake City, Utah Territory, U.S.
- Died: June 16, 1940 (aged 81); Salt Lake City, Utah, U.S.

Matthias Foss Cowley (August 25, 1858 – June 16, 1940) was a member of the Quorum of the Twelve Apostles of the Church of Jesus Christ of Latter-day Saints (LDS Church) from 1897 until 1905. He resigned from the Quorum of the Twelve due to his unwillingness to support the church's abolition of plural marriage. He and John W. Taylor are the most recent apostles of the LDS Church to have resigned from their positions.

== Calling to the Twelve ==
Cowley was born in Salt Lake City, Utah Territory. He was ordained an apostle on October 7, 1897, by church president Wilford Woodruff. He replaced Moses Thatcher, who was removed from the Quorum at the April 1896 general conference. Cowley was widely noted in the church for his sermons on doctrine.

Cowley submitted his resignation from the Quorum of the Twelve, at the request of church president Joseph F. Smith, on October 28, 1905, because his presence in the hierarchy undermined the church's position in the Reed Smoot hearings. Cowley was notorious for having performed marriages that contravened the church's 1890 Manifesto, which prohibited the contracting of new plural marriages. Apostle John W. Taylor also resigned at that time for the same reason. With the death of apostle Marriner W. Merrill in early February of the next year, there were three vacancies in the Quorum of the Twelve. At the April 1906 general conference, the resignations of Cowley and Taylor were presented to and accepted by the general church membership. As a result, three new apostles were called to replace them and Merrill: George F. Richards, Orson F. Whitney, and David O. McKay.

== After the Quorum ==
Reports of Cowley's continuing involvement in new plural marriages led to his priesthood being suspended by the church on May 11, 1911. This rare and virtually unique disciplinary procedure was used for Cowley because the members of the Quorum of the Twelve disagreed about whether to leave him undisciplined, to disfellowship him, or to excommunicate him.

After his priesthood was suspended, Cowley's name continued to be linked with plural marriage over the next several years. As late as the early 1920s, Cowley was meeting with excommunicated polygamists as the early Mormon fundamentalists began to coalesce at the Baldwin Radio Plant in Salt Lake City. In the mid-1920s, Cowley broke all ties with the polygamous dissenters. His priesthood standing in the LDS Church was restored on April 3, 1936, which was nearly 25 years after it had been suspended.

Cowley was never restored to his position in the Quorum of the Twelve. He died in his home in Salt Lake City, Utah, from uremia resulting from kidney failure. He was buried at Salt Lake City Cemetery.

== Honors and children ==
The town of Cowley, Wyoming, is named after Cowley. He was the father of LDS Church apostle Matthew Cowley by his wife, Abbie Hyde. His son, Samuel P. Cowley, by his wife, Luella Parkinson, was an FBI agent best known for his death at the hands of Lester "Baby Face Nelson" Gillis in 1934.

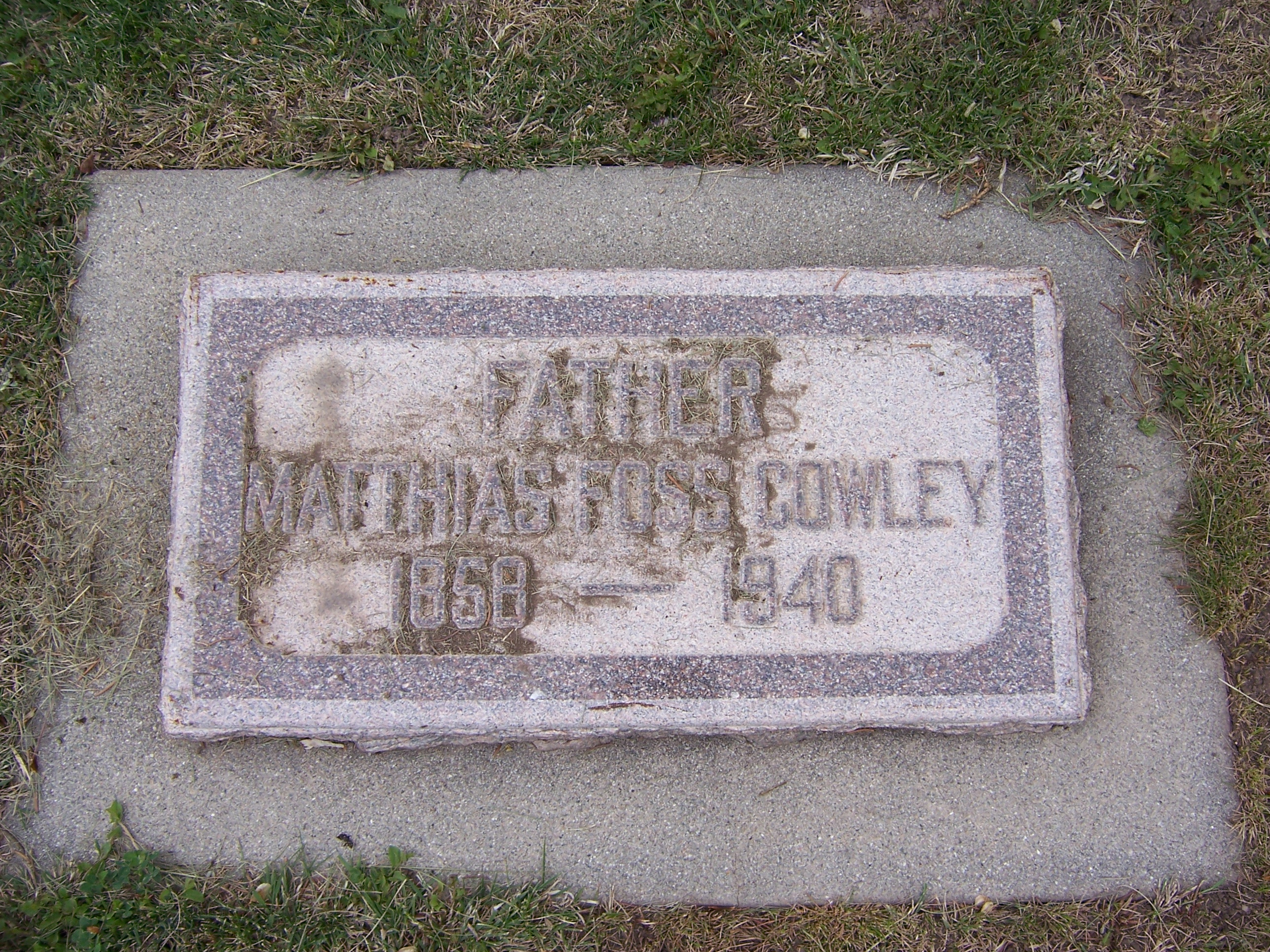
Grave marker of
Matthias F. Cowley.

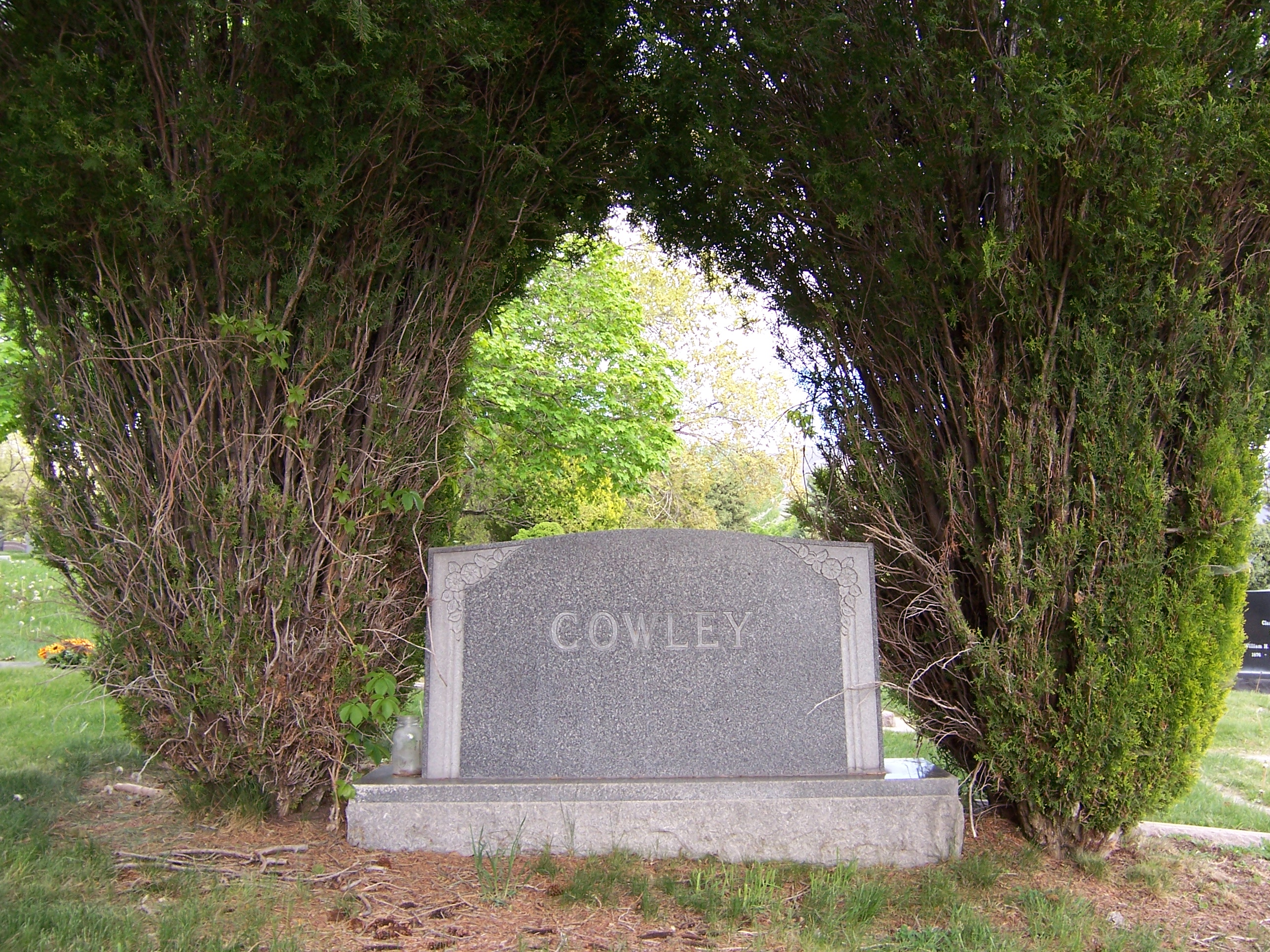
Cowley Family Monument

== Published works ==
- Matthias F. Cowley (1902). The Blood of the Prophets: Biographical sketches.
- Matthias F. Cowley (1902). Prophets and Patriarchs of the Church of Jesus of Christ of Latter-Day Saints. Chattanooga, Tenn., B.E. Rich.
- Matthias F. Cowley (1904). Cowley's talks on doctrine. Chattanooga, Tenn., Published by Ben E. Rich.
- Matthias F. Cowley (1909). Wilford Woodruff, Fourth President of the Church of Jesus Christ of Latter-Day Saints, History of His Life and Labors, as Recorded in His Daily Journals.
- Matthias F. Cowley (1963). Cowley & Whitney on Doctrine. Bookcraft. ASIN B0007HSATO.

== Notes ==
The Church of Jesus Christ of Latter-day Saints titles
Preceded by Abraham H. Cannon	Quorum of the Twelve Apostles; October 7, 1897 – October 28, 1905	Succeeded by Abraham O. Woodruff
