= Abraham O. Woodruff =

Apostle of The Church of Jesus Christ of Latter-day Saints

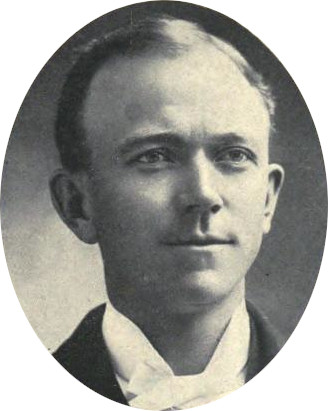

Quorum of the Twelve Apostles
- October 7, 1897 – June 20, 1904
- Called by: Wilford Woodruff

LDS Church Apostle
- October 7, 1897 – June 20, 1904
- Called by: Wilford Woodruff
- Reason: Removal of Moses Thatcher from Quorum of the Twelve; death of Abraham H. Cannon
- Reorganization at end of term: Charles W. Penrose ordained

Personal details
- Born: Abraham Owen Woodruff; November 23, 1872; Salt Lake City, Utah Territory, U.S.
- Died: June 20, 1904 (aged 31); El Paso, Texas, U.S.
- Resting place: Salt Lake City Cemetery; 40°46′37.92″N 111°51′28.8″W
- Spouse(s): Helen M. Winters; Eliza A. Clark
- Parents: Wilford Woodruff; Emma Smith

Abraham Owen Woodruff (November 23, 1872 – June 20, 1904) was a member of the Quorum of the Twelve Apostles of the Church of Jesus Christ of Latter-day Saints (LDS Church). He was also the son of LDS Church president Wilford Woodruff.

Owen Woodruff was born near Salt Lake City, Utah Territory and grew up working on his family's farm. Then, as a young man, he attended the Latter Day Saints' College and obtained a job at the Zion's Saving Bank and Trust Company. After serving a mission in Germany, he was ordained an apostle at the relatively young age of 24. In this capacity, he traveled throughout the Intermountain West, Canada, and Mexico, attending stake conferences of the church and identifying areas for potential Mormon colonies. Woodruff played a major role in the establishment of a Latter-day Saint settlement at Bighorn Basin, Wyoming. During one of his trips to Wyoming in 1901, he met and married his second wife, thus practicing plural marriage eleven years after his father issued the 1890 Manifesto that ended polygamy as an official practice of the church. Woodruff contracted smallpox while visiting his second wife in the Mormon colonies in Mexico and died in 1904 at the age of 31.

== Early life ==
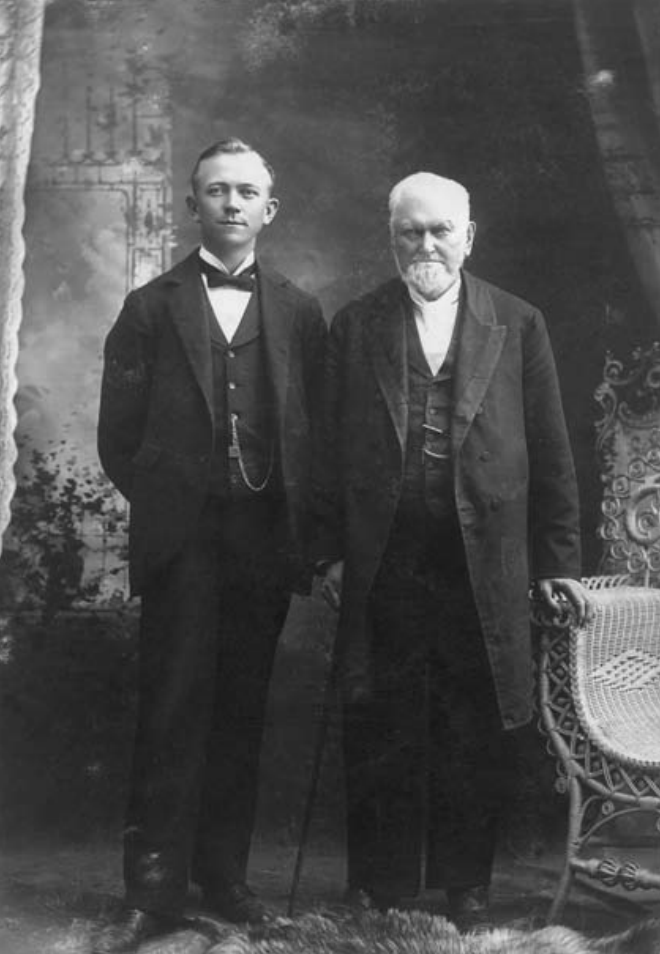
Wilford Woodruff with his son, Abraham Owen Woodruff, 1897

On November 23, 1872, Woodruff was born just south of Salt Lake City, Utah Territory, to Wilford Woodruff and Emma Smith Woodruff. He was the sixth of eight children. His mother was the second plural wife of Wilford Woodruff and the niece of Abraham O. Smoot, after whom Woodruff was named. On May 3, 1881, he was baptized a member of the LDS Church. He attended Brigham Young's funeral as a child. Woodruff's childhood home was a log house on the Woodruff homestead that his father had established after traveling across the Great Plains as a Mormon pioneer. During his young life, Woodruff helped out on the family farm; "he learned to hoe corn, plant and do general farm work." By the time he was ten, his job was to herd cows. He also sold watercress from Liberty Park in Salt Lake City for pocket money. He spent his free time fishing and hunting. He attended the local public schools and did well in his math classes. When the U.S. Congress passed the Edmunds Anti-Polygamy Act of 1882, Woodruff's father (Wilford Woodruff) went into hiding, seeking to avoid arrest for practicing plural marriage. Then, when Woodruff was fifteen years old, his father became president of the church.

After graduating from the 40th District school, Woodruff attended Latter-day Saints' College. Here, he studied under James E. Talmage and Karl G. Maeser for five years. Upon completion of his studies in 1891, Woodruff was hired to work at the Zion's Saving Bank and Trust Company. He was 18 years old. He worked as a collector before being promoted to assistant bookkeeper.

== Missionary years ==
In 1893, at age 21, Woodruff was called to the Swiss–German Mission. Around this time, his father's health had begun to deteriorate, which made Woodruff's departure a difficult matter; but his father encouraged him to go, so he left for Europe. He was assigned to preach first in the city of Frankfurt, Germany. At the outset of his mission, he studied the German language with the help of his host family, often for two hours a day. After a few months, he found a few people who wished to be baptized. Woodruff was then moved from Frankfurt to the city of Dresden, where he served as branch president. After preaching in Dresden, his last assignment was in Berlin. Here, Woodruff endured persecution against Latter-day Saint missionaries; the German government had chosen to promulgate "the banishment of the 'Mormon' Elders" from the country. In order to blend in, Woodruff dressed and acted like a common worker in the country and preached in secret in homes at night, receiving support from local church members. Then, in 1896, he was released from his mission after three years of service.

== Apostle of the LDS Church ==
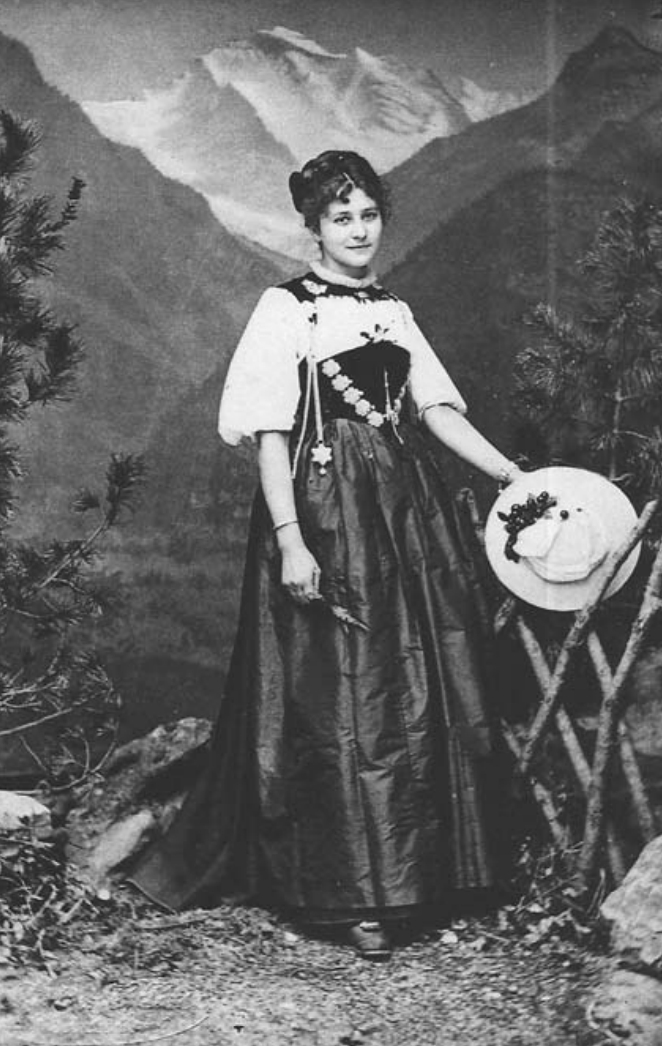
Helen May Winters, Abraham O. Woodruff's first wife

After his mission, Woodruff returned to work at the Zion's Saving Bank and Trust Co., of which he was eventually made director. On June 30, 1896, he married Helen May Winters. Woodruff's father performed the sealing ceremony. The following October, during a general conference of the church, he was called by his father as an apostle. He was 24 years old. He and Matthias F. Cowley were ordained to the Quorum of the Twelve Apostles after Abraham H. Cannon died and Moses Thatcher was released. Woodruff was the youngest member of the quorum at the time. He was ordained by his father on October 7, 1897 and was tasked with "traveling to various LDS congregations to dedicate buildings, call church leaders, and generally oversee the operations of the church." Woodruff traveled throughout Utah, Wyoming, Canada, and Mexico in his capacity as apostle.

He attended multiple stake conferences throughout the Intermountain West. He spoke at a stake conference held in Price, Utah, and, according to the Deseret Evening News, told the audience that "the Saints in general [were] on the improve." He then motioned for all the bishops and high councilors to stand up; and when it became obvious that only half of them were in attendance, Woodruff told the crowd that he "wished they [the absent bishops and high councilors] would hand in their resignations." At another stake conference in Brigham City, Utah, held in the Box Elder Stake Tabernacle, Woodruff spoke on the importance of the Second Coming, preaching the gospel, and marriage. At a stake conference in St. George, Utah, he told attendees of the importance of "improving [their] horses, cattle, sheep and fowls in general." At a conference of the Granite Stake in 1903, Woodruff quoted Theodore Roosevelt on the value of labor. Woodruff also took part in various additional functions as an apostle: he was present for the celebration of the thirteenth anniversary of the establishment of LDS College and, in 1901, he took part in planning the Brigham Young anniversary celebration.

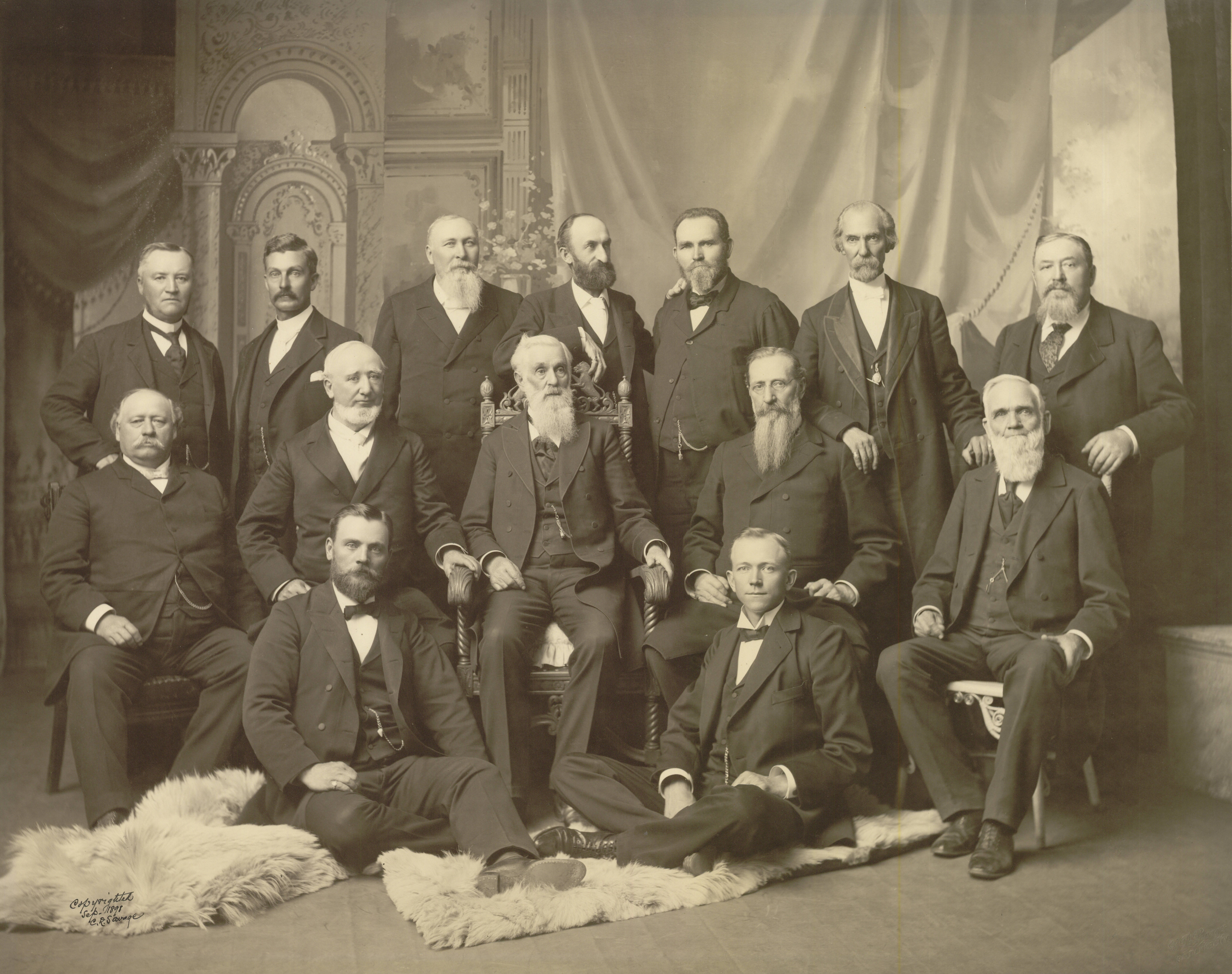
The First Presidency and Quorum of the Twelve, 1898

He was also a member of the general board of the Young Men's Mutual Improvement Association. His wife Helen Woodruff was on the general board of the Young Ladies' Mutual Improvement Association, so she and her husband often traveled together on church assignments. Of him, Woodruff's fellow LDS apostle Matthias F. Cowley wrote: "When appointed to any labor, he works with all his might, mind, and strength, coupled with implicit faith in our eternal Father. He is young, healthy, active and faithful in his high calling and will doubtless accomplish a mighty work in the earth, and live to see the redemption of Zion." During this time, Woodruff developed a close relationship with his father, Wilford Woodruff, whose health had waned over time. After Wilford Woodruff died in 1898, Owen Woodruff inherited from him two shares in the Zion's Savings Bank and Trust Co. Woodruff's father also appointed him, along with Asahel Hart, David Patten, Newton Woodruff, and Wilford Woodruff Jr., to compile and publish his biography. He focused much of his efforts as apostle on establishing new LDS settlements outside of Utah Territory.

=== Establishing a Mormon colony at Bighorn Basin, Wyoming ===
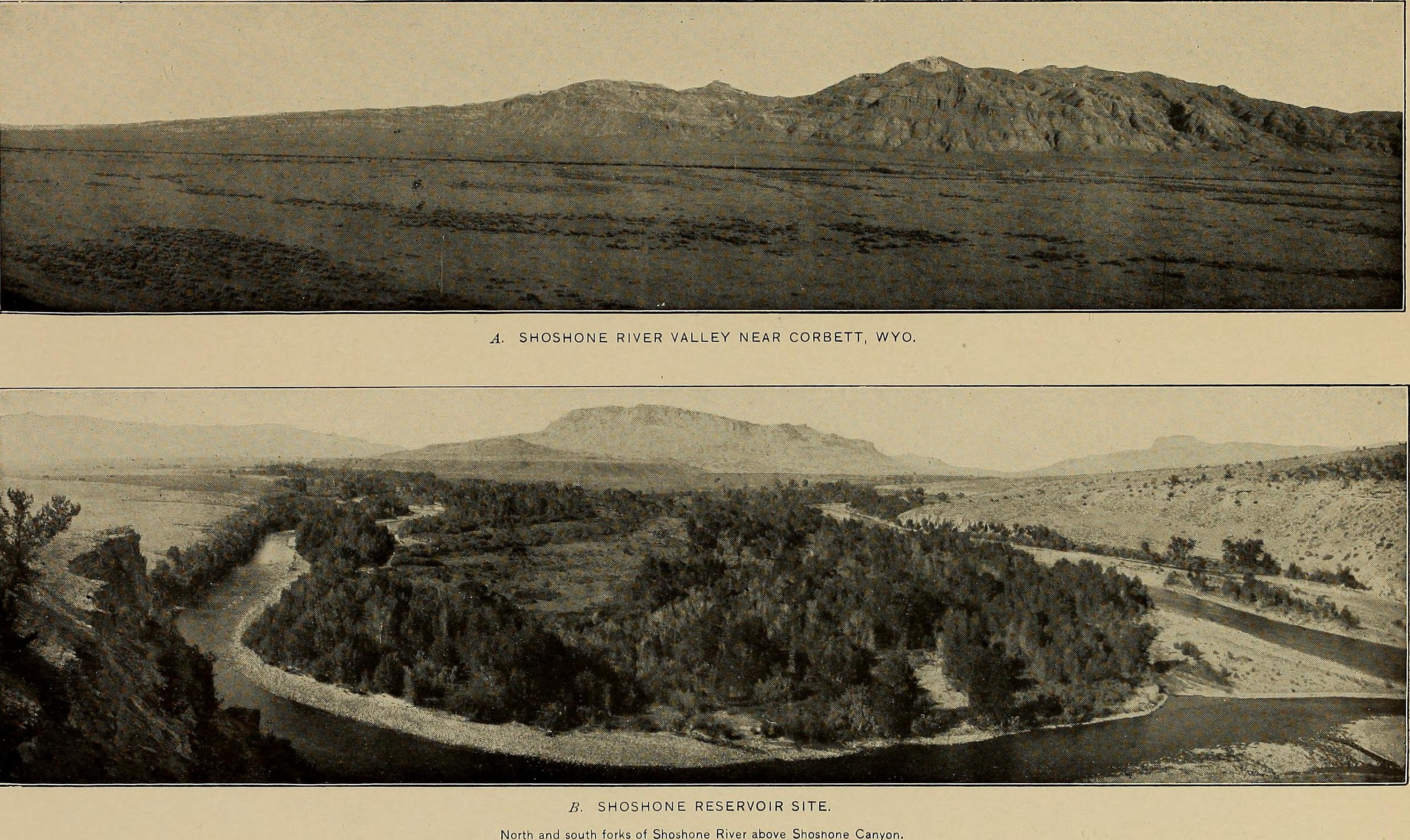
Geology and water resources of Bighorn Basin, Wyoming, 1906

Early in the year 1900, Woodruff traveled to the Bighorn River in Wyoming to scout the availability of resources and determine the feasibility of establishing a colony of Latter-day Saints there. In February, he traveled back to Salt Lake City to make his report to church leadership, traveling on the Northern Pacific Railway through Butte, Montana. He stayed with Colonel William F. Cody (also known as Buffalo Bill) in Cody, Wyoming during a bout of cold weather. Once he arrived in Utah, The Salt Lake Tribune reported that "Mr. Woodruff stated that he was delighted with eastern Montana and northern Wyoming, which is peculiarly adapted for Mormon husbandry. He said that he and his colleagues would make a favorable report to the higher officials of the Mormon church". Additionally, Woodruff told the Salt Lake Herald-Republican, "Our people are naturally agriculturalists, industrious and thrifty, and if the Big Horn country is what I am told it is, the colony should prove very successful." He became president of the Big Horn Basin Colonization Company and encouraged church members to migrate to Bighorn Basin, Wyoming.

Alongside a committee of public and church officials, Woodruff facilitated the purchase of 18,000 acres under the Carey Act on which to establish a new Mormon colony. The Wyoming state government cooperated with Woodruff, who said that the Wyoming representatives gave the committee "every encouragement in this matter". Land in the basin cost 25 cents per acre for settlers. Preparations for the settlement were finalized in March 1900. Under Woodruff's direction, 500 Latter-day Saints settled in Big Horn County, Wyoming in May 1900. He was there to greet them upon arrival. Then, in July 1901, group of Latter-day Saints from Sanpete County, Utah; Ogden, Utah; and Coalville, Utah left for Big Horn as well. One of the settlers' first projects was the construction of an irrigation system. In 1901 Woodruff was president of the "Wood River Live-stock company," which focused on fostering the livestock industry in Idaho and Wyoming.

== Post-Manifesto polygamy ==
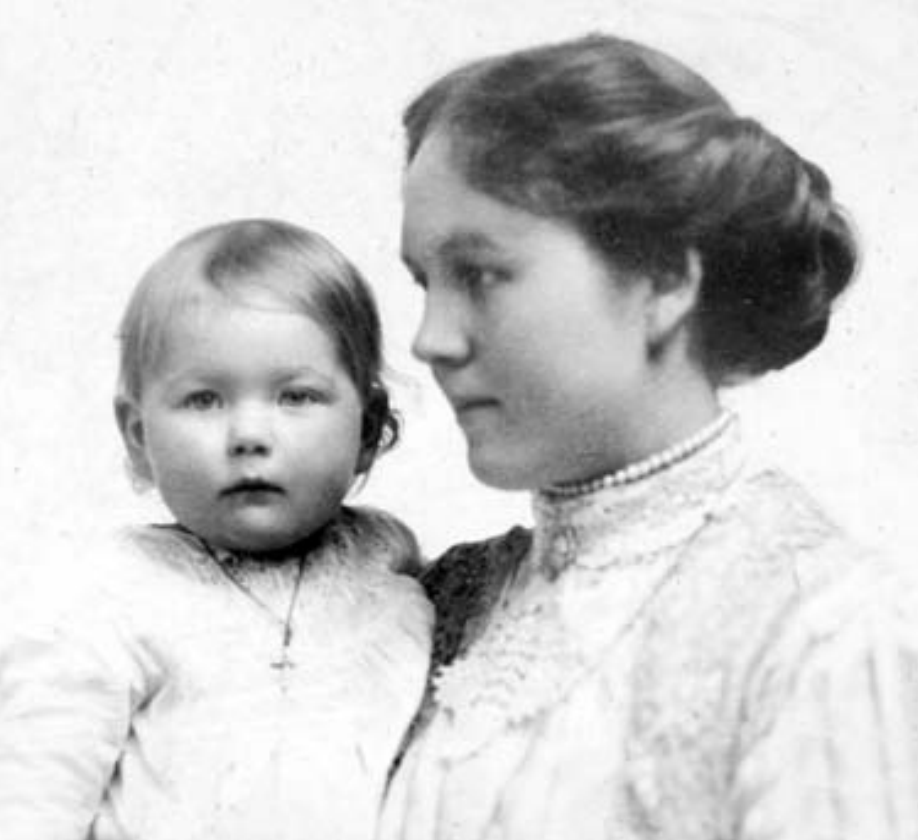
Avery Clark Woodruff and her daughter, Ruth, 1905

During one of his trips to Bighorn Basin, Woodruff met Eliza Avery Clark in Star Valley, Wyoming. He married her in 1901 while still married to his first wife, Helen, thus entering into plural marriage 11 years after his father issued the 1890 Manifesto, which ended polygamy as an official practice of the church. Woodruff was not alone in entering into post-Manifesto polygamy; there is evidence that other church leaders did the same, recognizing the Manifesto as the end of practicing plural marriage publicly but not privately. His marriage to Clark was largely kept a secret, and it is unknown if Joseph F. Smith, the church president at the time, gave permission for the union to take place. Of his decision to practice plural marriage, authors Lu Ann Faylor Snyder and Phillip A. Snyder wrote: "Eventually, apparently after much soul-searching, Owen determined to embrace post-Manifesto polygamy because he must have believed that the laws of God would eventually supersede those of the government despite the Manifesto’s promise of the church’s legal compliance."

Woodruff had four children with Helen Winters Woodruff: a son named Wilford Owen and three daughters named Helen Mar, June, and Rhoda. He had one child with Eliza Clark: a daughter named Ruth, born on April 11, 1904. Clark lived in Colonia Juárez, Chihuahua, a Latter-day Saint colony in Mexico, in order to keep her status as a plural wife a secret. Accompanied by Helen and their children, Woodruff visited Clark in Mexico shortly after the birth of their daughter, Ruth; apparently, "President [Joseph F.] Smith had sent Owen and Helen to Mexico to avoid the threat of arrest and the possibility of testifying in the [Reed] Smoot polygamy trials." He was included on a 1910 list of known post-Manifesto polygamists, apparently called "Sporadies".

== Death and legacy ==
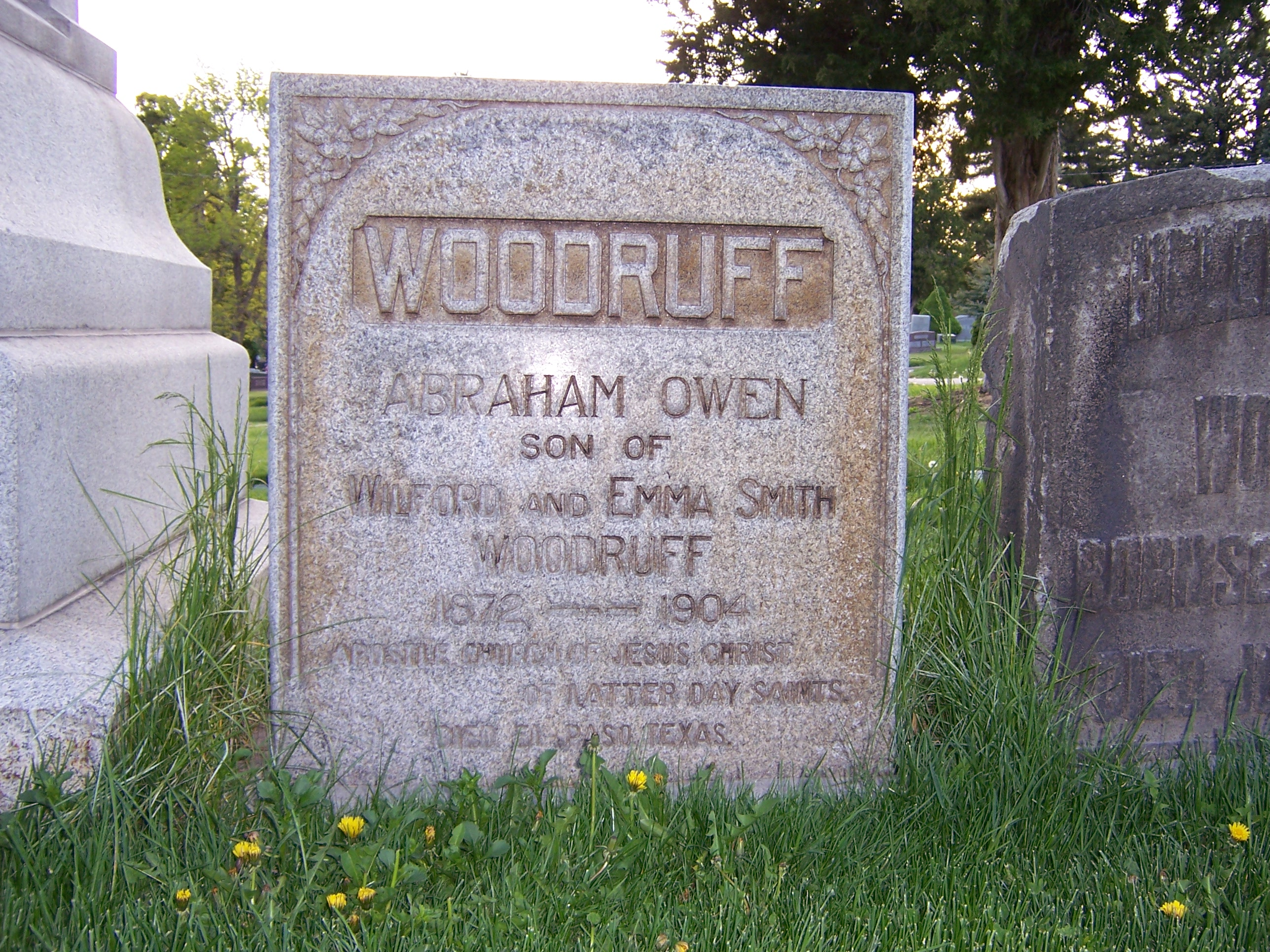
Abraham O. Woodruff's grave marker

While in Mexico, his wife Helen Woodruff contracted smallpox and died on June 7, 1904 after suffering with the disease for three weeks. The couple had been encouraged to be vaccinated against the disease, but Woodruff had opted not to receive the vaccine. After attending Helen's funeral in Mexico City, he began to travel back to the US, but stopped in El Paso, Texas when he grew ill. His doctor initially diagnosed the illness as typhoid fever, but it was soon revealed that he had smallpox. Woodruff's condition appeared to be improving; he began making preparations to return home to Salt Lake City when his illness worsened. He was kept in an "isolation hospital" in El Paso. Woodruff died on June 20, 1904, at the age of 31 in line with a prophecy given to Owen and Helen Woodruff by President Wilford Woodruff that they "would not be separated in death by more than two weeks." The Coalville Times reported that his "direct cause of death" was "heart failure."

Memorial services for Abraham Owen and Helen Woodruff were held on June 26, 1904 in the Granite Stake Tabernacle. The Deseret Evening News reported that around 1,500 people were in attendance. Francis M. Lyman, Seymour B. Young, Junius F. Wells, Martha H. Tingey, Maria Young Dougall, and J. Golden Kimball participated in the program. W. W. Maughan "read a biographical sketch of Apostle Woodruff." Woodruff was succeeded by Charles W. Penrose in his office as apostle. Heber J. Grant and his wife took care of Owen and Helen Woodruff's four children after their deaths. Their daughter Helen Woodruff Anderson went on to attend the University of Utah and later became a member of the Relief Society General Board. On July 17, 1993, Woodruff's body was transported from El Paso to Salt Lake City and was reinterred in the Salt Lake City Cemetery. His wife Helen's body was moved from Mexico City to rest beside Woodruff's.

Editor and politician S. A. Kenner described Woodruff as possessing "scrupulous honesty, simplicity, implicit faith in God, industry and a total absence of ostentation". The Iron County Record memorialized him as "one of those unostentatious unassuming sort of men who win the hearts of those with whom they come in contact by making them feel perfectly at home in their society, and that although they are called to hold a prominent place in the administration of public affairs, are not the least bit top heavy in consequence."

== See also ==
The Church of Jesus Christ of Latter-day Saints titles
Preceded by Matthias F. Cowley	Quorum of the Twelve Apostles; October 7, 1897 – June 20, 1904	Succeeded by Rudger Clawson
