= Richmond Relief Society Hall =

- U.S. National Register of Historic Places
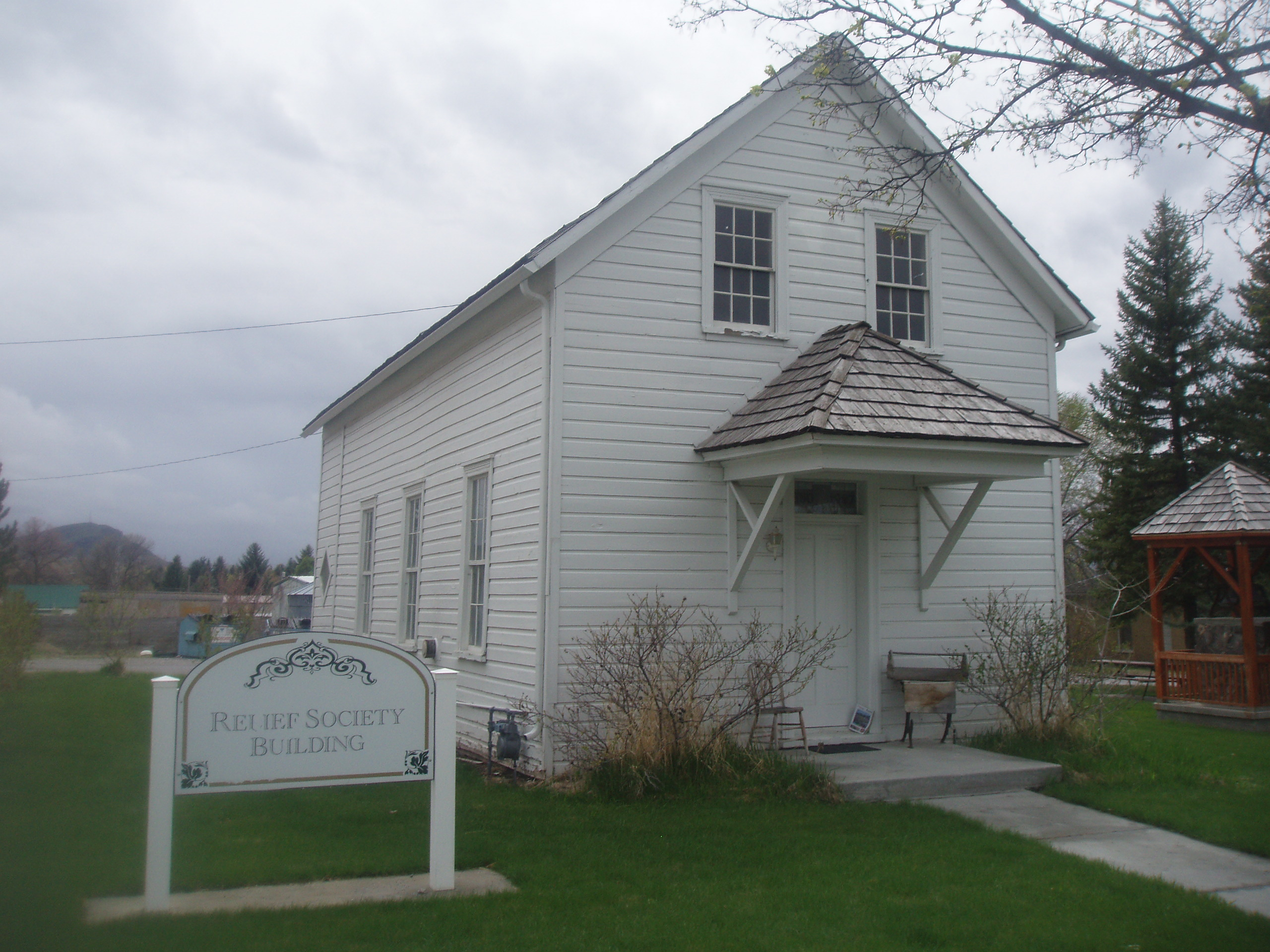
- The building in 2010

- Location within Utah Location within the United States
- Location: 15 East Main Street, Richmond, Utah
- Coordinates: 41°55′31″N 111°48′27″W
- Area: 0.3 acres (0.12 ha)
- Built: 1880-82
- Architectural style: Late Victorian
- MPS: Mormon Church Buildings in Utah MPS
- NRHP reference No.: 96000589
- Added to NRHP: June 7, 1996

The Richmond Relief Society Hall is a historic building in Richmond, Utah. It was built during 1880 to 1882 for the local chapter of the Relief Society of the Church of Jesus Christ of Latter-day Saints. It has been listed on the National Register of Historic Places since June 7, 1996.

It is a "modest" building; it was labeled "Victorian" in style in its National Register nomination, but no Victorian features are identified. It was deemed notable as "one [of] the oldest known original Relief Society Halls existing in Utah."

A committee was appointed to raise money for a hall in the late 1870s. Mary Jane Andrus, Frances Hobbs, Lydia Standley, and Almira J. Bainbridge were the main contributors of the committee. It served as a Relief Society Hall until the construction of the Richmond Tabernacle in 1906. After, the Hall was used as a schoolhouse by Apostle Marriner Wood Merrill to teach his children with a private teacher, Ida Cook, until 1919. That same year, the Daughters of Utah Pioneers purchased the building for a relic hall and meeting place.

On January 16, 1959, Richmond Mayor Ross H. Plant met with the Camp to discuss purchasing the Tithing Office to house the relics and serve as the camp's new headquarters. The Camp agreed, and on May 23, 1959, the James Hendricks camp moved the relics to the tithing office.

In 1969, the City purchased the Relief Society Hall and used it as a storage shed. A large entrance was cut in the back of the building to make it into a garage. By 1995, the building was in disrepair, and the city was about to give the building to the Richmond City Fire Department for a controlled burn. Members of the DUP Camp pleaded with the city to preserve the building and restore it to its former glory. Richmond Mayor Kip E. Panter decided to save the building. The Restoration Committee for the Richmond Relief Society Hall was formed, with Maria Lundgreen, Nancy Cornia, and Kathy Jones as main contributors to its restoration. The restoration was completed in 1997. During its reconstruction in 1996, the Hall was added to the National Register of Historic Places.
