= Joseph F. Merrill =

American religious leader

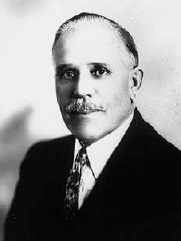

Quorum of the Twelve Apostles
- October 8, 1931 – February 3, 1952

LDS Church Apostle
- October 8, 1931 – February 3, 1952
- Reason: Death of Orson F. Whitney
- Reorganization at end of term: LeGrand Richards ordained

Personal details
- Born: Joseph Francis Merrill; August 24, 1868; Richmond, Utah Territory, United States
- Died: February 3, 1952 (aged 83); Salt Lake City, Utah, United States
- Resting place: Salt Lake City Cemetery; 40°46′37.92″N 111°51′28.8″W

Joseph Francis Merrill (August 24, 1868 – February 3, 1952) was a member of the Quorum of the Twelve Apostles of the Church of Jesus Christ of Latter-day Saints (LDS Church) from 1931 until his death.

Merrill was a key figure in the development of the Church Educational System in the early twentieth century. He served as the sixth Commissioner of Church Education from 1928 to 1933. Prior to his service as commissioner, he played a significant role in the creation of the LDS Church's "released time" seminary system. His tenure as commissioner also saw creation of the Institutes of Religion and the transfer of nearly all the remaining church schools to control of the states they resided in. He also faced a crisis in 1930 and 1931 which threatened to end the released time seminary, but the LDS Church education system survived the Great Depression under his leadership. In 1931, while still serving as commissioner, Merrill was called to the Quorum of the Twelve Apostles.

== Early life ==
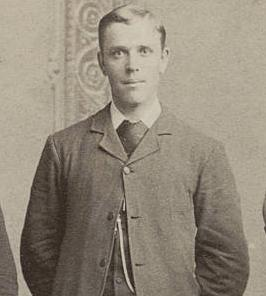
Merrill while at the University of Deseret

Merrill was born in Richmond, Utah Territory. He was a great-grandson of noted Mormon pioneer Stillman Pond, grandson of church Patriarch Joseph C. Kingsbury, and the son of LDS Church apostle Marriner W. Merrill. Joseph was among the first Latter-day Saints from Utah to travel to the eastern United States to seek higher education. He studied at the University of Deseret, the University of Michigan, and Johns Hopkins University; he was the first native Utahn to receive a Ph.D. While at the University of Michigan, Merrill was the president of the Ann Arbor Branch of the LDS Church. In 1911, Merrill was called to serve in the presidency of the Granite Utah Stake of the LDS Church.

Upon his return to Utah, in 1893, Merrill began teaching physics and assisting in chemistry at the University of Utah. In 1895, he became the first principal of the newly established School of Mines, now the University of Utah College of Engineering. (The Merrill Engineering building on the University of Utah campus is named in his honor.)

Although the University of Utah established the mining school in the 1890s, it was little more than a basic assay and geology course until after increased funding in 1901. From then to 1928, when Merrill left, the school slowly emerged as one of the best of the mining engineering schools in the American West. Professor Merrill's career as head of the University of Utah School of Mines coincided with a rapid growth in the Utah mining industry. Major scientific discoveries and technological innovations brought the industry out of the era of the lone-prospector and small company mine and mill operation to a world dominated by multi-national corporations working on massive scales, which required a large body of degreed mining engineers, metallurgists, industrial chemists, and other college-educated workers. Early graduates of the program quickly found work in the industry, nearby then globally.

In 1913, Merrill successfully attracted funding for a metallurgical research center cooperatively staffed by the university and by the new U. S. Bureau of Mines. The Utah experiment station funded original research by students, who received fellowships, as well as university faculty and staff members of the U. S. Bureau of Mines. Breakthroughs in understanding of the flotation process, cyanide extraction process, of radium (by Samuel C. Lind), and a host of other topics including smelter smoke abatement studies were major contributions in the field. During Merrill's tenure the School of Mines also expanded to offer additional degrees in engineering, including civil engineering, electrical engineering, and chemical engineering. During the mid-1910s, the School of Mines of the University of Utah added "and engineering school" to its name. In 1928, the university determined the funds for mining and metallurgy research were better spent elsewhere, and the cuts caused staff to leave, such as Antoine Marc Gaudin, a leading metallurgical scientist who left for MIT. Prof. Merrill retired that year as well.

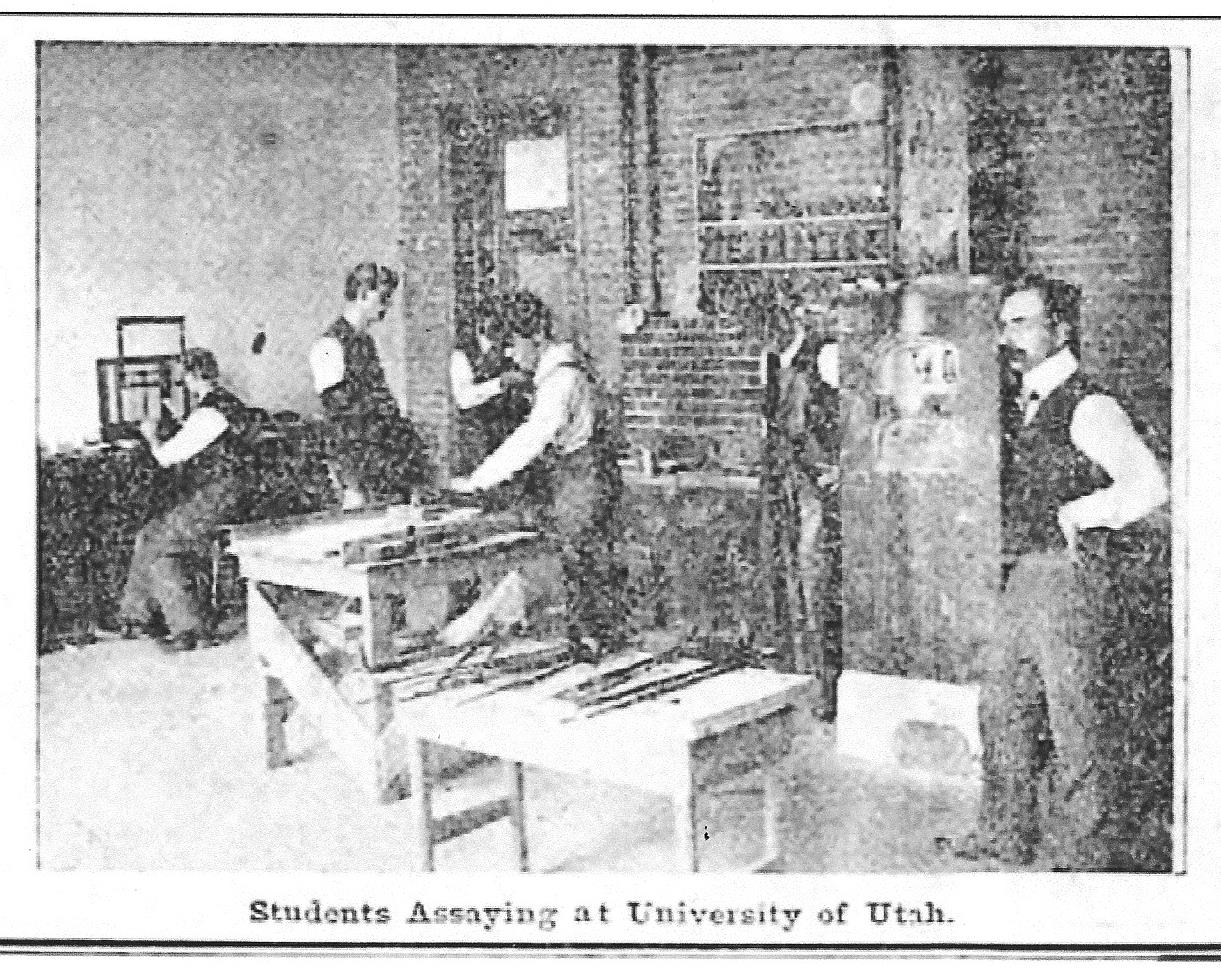
Students at Assay Lab, School of Mines, University of Utah, 1901. Merrill at right

In 1898, Merrill married Annie Laura Hyde, the daughter of Alonzo Hyde and Annie Taylor Hyde. Merrill and his wife would become the parents of seven children. Their home was part of the social life of students in the early mining engineering classes.

== Church education role ==
Upon hearing his wife relate stories from the Book of Mormon she had learned in a class taught by James E. Talmage, Merrill began to seek means for students attending public high schools to have some form of weekday religious education. Influenced by Christian seminaries he had seen at the University of Chicago, Merrill worked with the Granite School Board and the Church General Board of Education to secure the necessary funding and legal rights to open an LDS seminary next to Granite High School. In his search for a proper teacher to instruct the youth, Merrill wrote:

May I say that it is the desire of the Presidency of the Stake to find a young man who is properly qualified to do the work in the most satisfactory manner. By young, we do not necessarily mean a teacher who is young in years, but a man who can command their respect and admiration and exercise great influence over them. We want a man who can enjoy student sports and activities as well as one who is a good teacher. We want a man who is a thorough student, one who will not teach in a perfunctory way, but who will enliven his instruction with a strong winning personality and give evidence of thorough understanding of a scholarship in the things he teaches. It is desired that the school be thoroughly successful and a teacher is wanted who is a leader and who will be universally regarded as the inferior to no teacher in the high school.

Merrill found the right man in Thomas J. Yates, a young engineer in the Granite Stake. After the building completed and the curriculum developed, the first released-time LDS seminary opened its doors in 1912.

In 1928, Merrill left his position at the University of Utah to serve as the head of the LDS Church school system. Upon Merrill's acceptance, the name of the position was officially changed from "Superintendent of Church Schools" to "Church Commissioner of Education". As commissioner, Merrill faced several unique challenges.

Merrill took over the development of the first institute program at Moscow, Idaho. Working with J. Wyley Sessions, Merrill helped develop the basic goals of the institute program, which he felt should be designed to help students reconcile the secular learning of university with the spiritual truths of the church. He wrote:

In this collegiate seminary work we are, of course, starting on a new thing in the Church. But if we keep the objective clearly in mind it may be helpful. And may I say that this objective, as I see it, is to enable our young people attending the colleges to make the necessary adjustments between the things they have been taught in the Church and the things they are learning in the university, to enable them to become firmly settled in their faith as members of the Church. The big question, then, is what means and methods can be employed to help them to make these reconciliations and adjustments. The primary purpose, therefore, is not to teach them theology. It is not to prepare them for seminary teachers or preachers of the Gospel. We should, therefore, continually hold before our minds that we want to hold them in the Church, make them active, intelligent, sincere, Latter-day Saints. We want to keep them from growing cold in the faith and indifferent to their obligations as Church members. We want to help them to see that it is perfectly reasonable and logical to be really sincere Latter-day Saints.

With the successful launch of institute, Merrill's next task was to facilitate the withdrawal of the LDS Church from the field of secular education in the United States. Most of the church schools had already been closed in the early 1920s, but Brigham Young University (BYU) and several junior colleges remained under church control. In a meeting of the Church General Board of Education in February 1929, Merrill was asked to begin the process of closing all of the remaining schools. Despite the onset of the Great Depression, Merrill was able to successfully negotiate with the Utah State Legislature to ensure the successful transfer of Weber, Snow and Dixie Colleges from the LDS Church to Utah. In Arizona, Gila College was also transferred to the state and was later renamed Eastern Arizona College. When the Idaho legislature rejected an offer to take control of Ricks College, Merrill worked to ensure its survival as a private school, despite seriously diminished funding. Merrill also worked with other church leaders to keep BYU under church control. He felt that maintaining one university was vital for the future training of seminary teachers. He saw the value in maintaining a corps of trained scholars who were well versed in the teachings of the church. In addition, he felt that a church university would be a light to the world, functioning as a showcase for the academic achievements of church members.

In 1930, state high school inspector I. L. Williamson issued a highly critical report on the relationships between LDS seminaries and public high schools in Utah. Influenced by this report, the Utah State Board of Education moved to suspend released time privileges statewide. Merrill worked to ensure the continuation of released time, speaking before the State Board to in an attempt to convince them of the benefits and legality of seminary. When the Board voted on the issue in 1931, both released time and credit for Bible study were retained. With most of the LDS Church-run schools eliminated by this point, Merrill's action ensured the survival of what would become the dominant form of religious education for the church in Utah.

Merrill also dealt with the effects of the Great Depression, cutting costs in education. Rather than laying off employees, Merrill asked all members of church education to take pay cuts. During his service, church spending on education was cut nearly in half.

Despite the hard times he saw during his tenure as commissioner, Merrill took great joy in his work. Upon his call as commissioner he said:

Again may I say that I believe there is no kind of education in the world that is so fine and so elevating and so good and so important as religious education. And I believe that nowhere in the world is there a system of religious education that is equal in its quality, in its thoroughness and in its comprehensiveness to the system of education that is being undertaken in this Church. The time will come, I verily believe, and before very many years, when week-day religious education will be offered to every high school boy and girl, to every college and university boy and girl in this Church.

== Mission president ==
When Merrill left Utah in 1933 to serve as president of the European Mission of the church, he passed his fiscal philosophies on to the missionaries serving under him. One of them, future apostle and church president Gordon B. Hinckley, cited Merrill's influence as a major factor in his own financial thinking. J. Wyley Sessions called Merrill the "most economical, conservative General Authority of this dispensation."

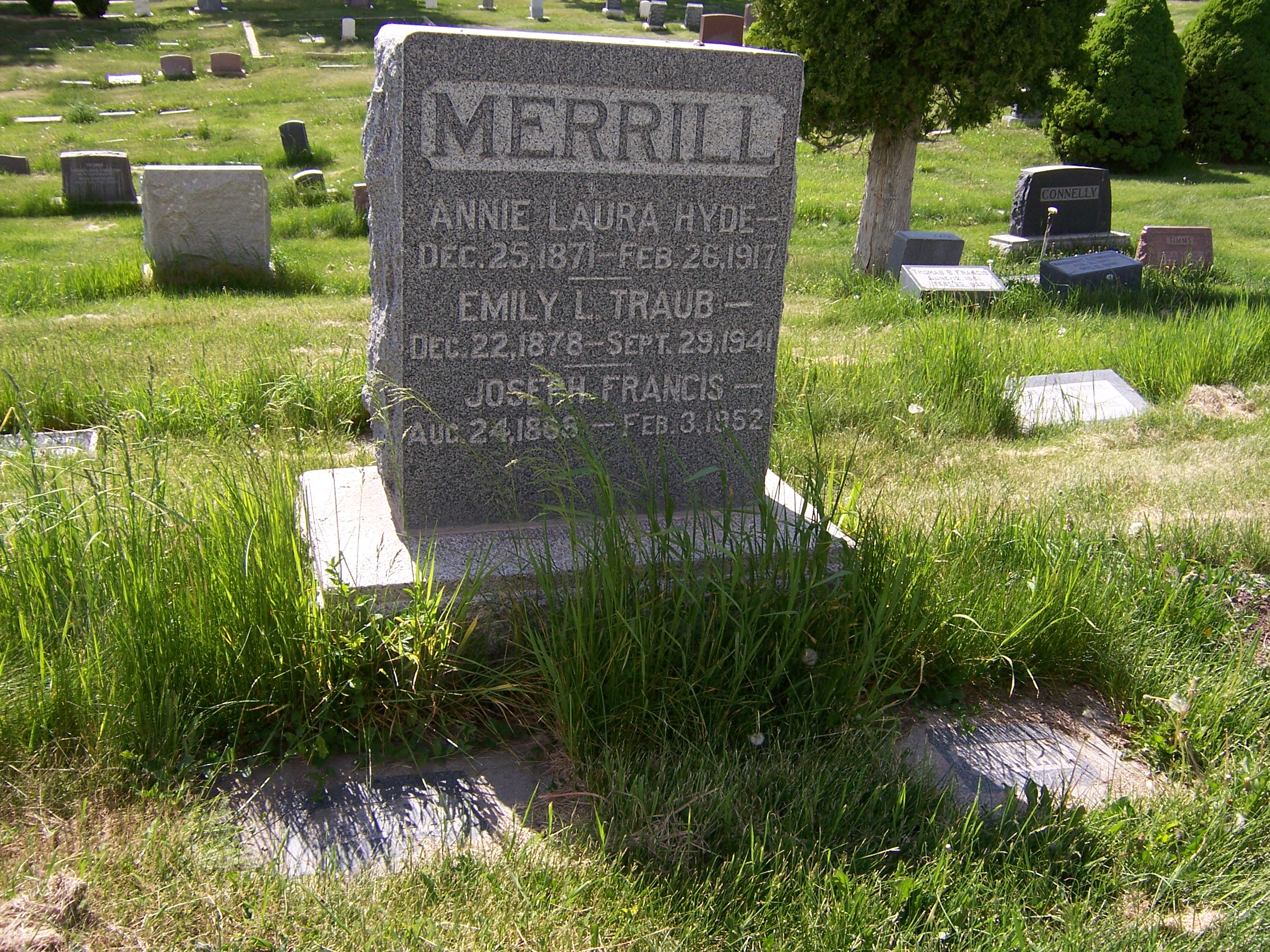
Grave marker of Joseph F. Merrill.

== Later life ==
Merrill served as an apostle until his death in 1952 in Salt Lake City from coronary thrombosis. Upon his death, fellow apostle Joseph Fielding Smith offered the following tribute: "I marveled at his energy. Apparently he never got tired; he loved the truth. He loved the truth of science, but he loved more the truths of the gospel of Jesus Christ ... He had a strong will, was pronounced in his opinions, but he was always submissive to the majority decisions of his brethren." Merrill was buried at Salt Lake City Cemetery.

== Notes ==
The Church of Jesus Christ of Latter-day Saints titles
Preceded by John A. Widtsoe	Quorum of the Twelve Apostles; October 8, 1931–February 3, 1952	Succeeded by Charles A. Callis
