= Lorin Farr =

American politician

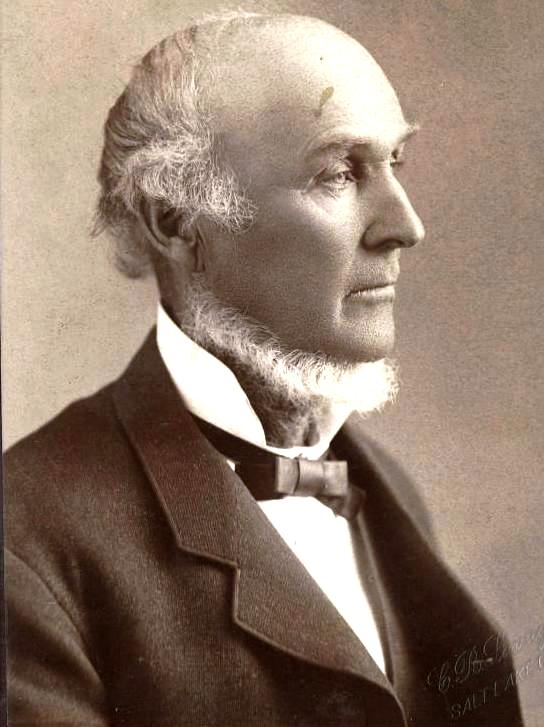

Mayor of Ogden, Utah

In office
- 1851 – ca. 1871

Personal details
- Born: July 27, 1820; Waterford, Vermont, United States
- Died: January 12, 1909 (aged 88); Ogden, Utah, United States
- Resting place: Ogden City Cemetery; 41.2325°N 111.9622°W
- Spouse(s): Nancy Bailey Chase Sarah Giles; Nicoline Erickson; Clara J. Bates; Olive A. Jones; Mary Bingham
- Parents: Winslow Farr; Olive H. Freeman

Lorin Farr (July 27, 1820 – January 12, 1909) was a Mormon pioneer and the first mayor of Ogden, Utah.

Farr was born in Waterford, Vermont. He was a son of Winslow Farr and the brother of Winslow Farr, Jr., who later became the first Latter Day Saint bishop of Colonia Dublán, Mexico.

When he was eleven, Lorin Farr joined the LDS church after being introduced to it by Orson Pratt and Lyman E. Johnson. Farr's baptism was performed by Johnson.

The Farr family moved to Kirtland, Ohio in 1837 and then to Missouri in 1838, and to Nauvoo, Illinois after that. In 1843 and 1844, Farr served as a missionary in many states of the United States. During his sojourn at Nauvoo, his one-story red brick home was situated on Durphy Street just north of his father's home and south of the Wilford Woodruff residence. Other neighbors living nearby included Stillman Pond and Heber C. Kimball.

Single-story red brick home of Lorin Farr (adjacent to and just north of his father's home, but situated south of Apostle Wilford Woodruff's home) on Durphy Street. The Farrs were neighbors of the Heber C. Kimball and Stillman Pond families, who lived nearby on Munson Street. These streets formed, respectively, the east and south sides of block 106, Nauvoo, Illinois.

Lorin went west with the body of the Latter Day Saints, arriving in the Salt Lake Valley in September 1847.

In 1851, Farr was called as president of the newly formed Weber Stake, which required him to move to Ogden. He also served as the first mayor of Ogden, a member of the Utah Territorial Legislature, and, from 1870 to 1871, served as a missionary in the British Isles.

Farr was the father of many children. Among these was Sarah Farr, who was a wife of Apostle John Henry Smith and the mother of George Albert Smith, who became the eighth President of the Church of Jesus Christ of Latter-day Saints.

He is the 3rd great-grandfather of Utah Senator Mike Lee.
-----------------------------------------------------------------------------------------------------------------------------------------------------
