= 1962 Cache Valley earthquake =

Earthquake in Utah

- Location within Utah
- UTC time: 1962-08-30 13:35:28
- ISC event: 875249
- USGS-ANSS: ComCat
- Local date: 30 August 1962; 63 years ago
- Local time: 06:35 a.m. MDT
- Magnitude: M_{L} 5.9
- Depth: 10 kilometres (6.2 mi)
- Epicenter: 41.917°N 111.733°W
- Fault: East Cache Fault
- Areas affected: Utah, Idaho
- Max. intensity: MMI VII (Very strong)
- Casualties: 1+ injured

The 1962 Cache Valley earthquake was a magnitude M_{w} 5.9 earthquake that occurred on Thursday, 30 August 1962 at approximately 6:35 AM MT north of Richmond, Utah, United States, at the border between Utah and Idaho. No people were killed in the quake. The quake caused between US $1–2 million in damage.

== Earthquake ==
The 1962 Cache Valley earthquake occurred on Thursday, 30 August 1962 at 6:35 AM MT at the border of Utah and Idaho, north of Richmond, Utah in the United States. In addition to Utah and Idaho, the quake was felt in Colorado, Montana, Nevada, and Wyoming.

=== Magnitude and intensity ===
There is disagreement on the size of this earthquake. The United States Geological Survey report shows a magnitude M_{w} 5.9, and the report from the Intermountain Seismic Belt Historical Earthquake Project at the University of Utah shows a magnitude of M_{w} 5.7. At least one news outlet stated the University of Utah recorded the quake as being a magnitude M_{w} 5.5. The Mercalli intensity was reported as VII (Very Strong).

== Destruction ==
Property damage was estimated between US$1–2 million (US$8.5–17 million in 2020). At the time of the quake, it was the most costly in the history of Utah. Most of the damage was in Richmond, but the nearby towns of Logan, Franklin, Lewiston, and Preston also had some damage.

The building with the most significant damage was the LDS Benson Stake Tabernacle in Richmond, which was eventually torn down due to the extensive structural issues caused by the quake. Several older houses also had to be torn down due to the damage received. There was extensive damage to North Cache High School, headstones in the cemetery were knocked over, and many houses had collapsed chimneys and masonry, broken windows, and cracked walls. The high school had to be closed for repairs.

No people were killed in the quake. One person was cut on her foot by a broken bottle.

== Legacy ==
A commemorative event was held in Richmond on 30 August 2012.
