= Cherry Peak Resort =

Ski area in Utah, United States

Cherry Peak

- Location in Utah Cherry Peak (the United States)
- Location: Cherry Canyon; Cache County, Utah; United States
- Nearest city: Richmond, Utah; Logan, Utah; Salt Lake City
- Coordinates: 41°55′35″N 111°45′24″W
- Vertical: 1,265 ft (386 m)
- Top elevation: 7,050 ft (2,150 m)
- Base elevation: 5,775 ft (1,760 m)
- Skiable area: 200 acres (0.81 km^{2})
- Trails: 29; 30% easiest 45% more difficult 25% most difficult
- Lift system: 3 chairlifts
- Terrain parks: 1
- Snowfall: 322 in. - (818 cm)
- Snowmaking: yes
- Night skiing: yes
- Website: skicpr.com

Cherry Peak is a ski area in northern Utah that opened in 2014 and first used for skiing in the 2014–2015 season. It is located in Cherry Canyon, east of Richmond, Utah in the Bear River Mountains. While smaller and less developed than a number of Utah ski resorts, Cherry Peak is close and convenient to residents of nearby Logan, Utah State University, and Cache Valley. It also hosts students from more distant universities.

The resort has snowmaking equipment which it uses to augment the natural snowfall as needed.

The resort is accessed by driving 3.5 miles (5.5 km) east from Richmond, Utah (on 500 North Street) into Cherry Canyon. Due to its smaller size and relative distance from the Wasatch Front, it is presently mostly considered a locally-oriented facility.

== Origin ==
Property owner John Chadwick began securing licenses and agreements for the proposed resort in 2009. His concept for an Olympic-themed ski area was met with resistance by local residents, and skiers who already used the property as part of their cross-country skiing paths and alpine descents.

By 2013, all was in order and construction began. The facility was opened in late 2014 with hopes to operate during the winter season, but a combination of final details and sparse snowfall that year caused the opening date to be moved to December 21, 2015.

The initial operation used two lifts, servicing five runs. For the 2016–17 season, a third lift had been completed and 29 runs had been groomed and marked. The combined length of the runs available is 20 kilometers.

== Cherry Peak facilities ==
Facilities include a day lodge (Note: The listed coordinates are for the lodge building.) with grill restaurant, a full-service ski rental operation, ski instructors, and a ski shop. The lodge is also open during the summer, and several summertime events have been held, including alpine hiking, and evening concerts. Consideration was given to hosting mountain biking events there, but due to the limited terrain this has not been pursued to date.

When first opened, the resort was unusual among the state's resorts in that it did not operate on Sundays, even though that is usually the busiest or second-busiest day for most ski resorts. However, as of February 19, 2017, it is now open on Sundays.

== Cherry Peak lifts ==
- Gateway Lift - runs from the lodge to the top of the canyon ridge. It opens onto several runs ranging from easier to most difficult. It also provides access to the remaining two lifts.
- Vista Lift - runs from the base of the Vista Lift to an intermediate opening, from which four easier and four more difficult runs are available.
- Summit Lift - runs on the south side of the mountain ridge, terminating at the crest of the resort (7050' MSL). All runs from the summit are classed as more difficult or most difficult.
