= Richmond, Utah =

City in Utah, United States

- City
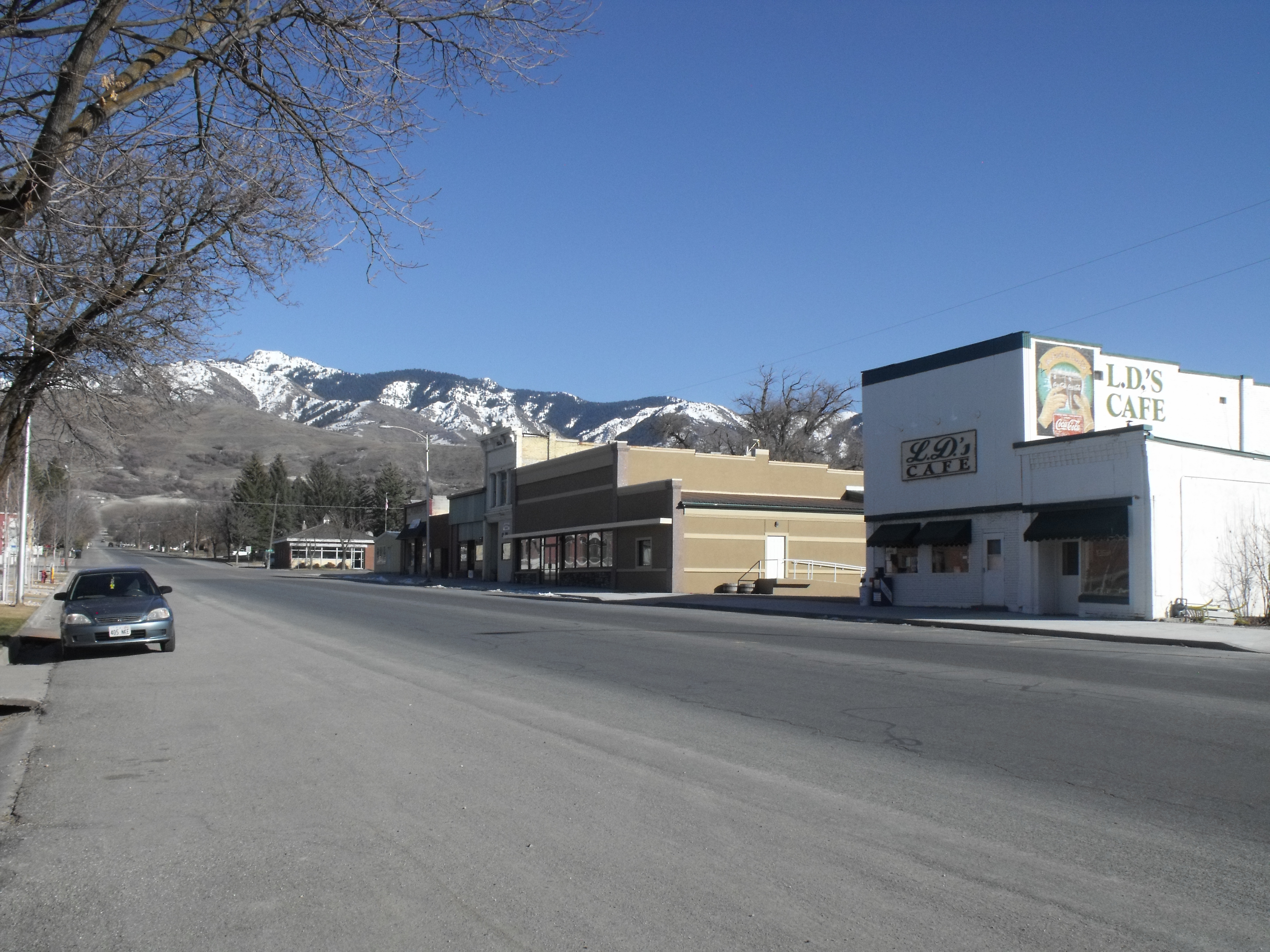
- Richmond City Main Street, 2016

- Location in Cache County and the state of Utah.
- Coordinates: 41°55′23″N 111°48′28″W
- Country: United States
- State: Utah
- County: Cache
- Settled: 1859
- Incorporated: 1868

Government
  - Type: Mayor-Council government

Area
  - Total: 3.50 sq mi (9.06 km^{2})
  - Land: 3.50 sq mi (9.06 km^{2})
  - Water: 0 sq mi (0.00 km^{2})
- Elevation: 4,652 ft (1,418 m)

Population (2020)
  - Total: 2,914
  - Density: 811.2/sq mi (313.19/km^{2})
- Time zone: UTC-7 (Mountain (MST))
  - Summer (DST): UTC-6 (MDT)
- ZIP code: 84333
- Area code: 435
- FIPS code: 49-63680
- GNIS feature ID: 2410941
- Website: richmondutah.gov

Richmond is a city in Cache County, Utah, United States. The population was 2,733 at the 2020 census. It is included in the Logan metropolitan area.

== History ==
Agrippa Cooper was the first settler in Richmond in the mid-1850s. In 1859, surveyors visited the Richmond area and determined it to be a suitable area for living, with abundant water that could be used for farming and milling, and land that was fertile for growing crops. Within a few years log cabins, dugouts, and a log fort had been built. In 1860, a sawmill and a schoolhouse were erected. The city was settled mainly by Mormon pioneers, such as Thomas Levi Whittle, John Bair, Stillman Pond, Goudy E. Hogan, and Marriner W. Merrill.

The city was likely named in honor of LDS apostle Charles C. Rich, who had been the Apostle who traveled to the American Falls area of California in 1850 to call the first ten Latter-day Saint missionaries (including Whittle) to serve in Hawaii. Other factors involved in selecting the name may also have been the rich local soil or that Richmond, London was the hometown of some of its English settlers.

In 1860, LDS Church President Brigham Young visited the settlement of Richmond to council and direct the settlement. The Native Americans in the Cache Valley were becoming hostile to many of the Mormon pioneers, and many violent battles had already been fought. Young counseled the settlers to "Move your families and wagons close together, then, if you are disturbed, you are like a hive of bees, and everyone is ready and knows at once what to do." This led the settlers to build a fort named "Fort Richmond".

Richmond was incorporated on February 6, 1868.

The 1962 Cache Valley earthquake, which occurred east of Richmond in the Bear River Range, destroyed many pioneer buildings in Richmond, including the original home of Marriner W. Merrill, and the two-story LDS brick Stake Tabernacle.

== Geography ==
According to the United States Census Bureau, the city has a total area of 3.50 square miles (9.06 km^{2}), all land.

=== Climate ===
This climatic region is typified by large seasonal temperature differences, with hot summers and cold (sometimes severely cold) winters. According to the Köppen Climate Classification system, Richmond has a dry-summer humid continental climate, abbreviated "Dsa" on climate maps.

Climate data for Richmond, Utah, 1991–2020 normals, extremes 1949–present
Month	Jan	Feb	Mar	Apr	May	Jun	Jul	Aug	Sep	Oct	Nov	Dec	Year
Record high °F (°C)	60 (16)	66 (19)	76 (24)	89 (32)	97 (36)	101 (38)	109 (43)	104 (40)	100 (38)	88 (31)	72 (22)	67 (19)	109 (43)
Mean maximum °F (°C)	46.7 (8.2)	52.2 (11.2)	66.6 (19.2)	76.4 (24.7)	84.6 (29.2)	93.0 (33.9)	99.2 (37.3)	97.6 (36.4)	91.0 (32.8)	79.6 (26.4)	62.7 (17.1)	50.4 (10.2)	99.9 (37.7)
Mean daily maximum °F (°C)	30.7 (−0.7)	36.5 (2.5)	48.8 (9.3)	57.5 (14.2)	67.6 (19.8)	78.6 (25.9)	89.3 (31.8)	87.4 (30.8)	76.9 (24.9)	61.2 (16.2)	45.0 (7.2)	31.8 (−0.1)	59.3 (15.2)
Daily mean °F (°C)	23.7 (−4.6)	28.3 (−2.1)	38.9 (3.8)	46.0 (7.8)	54.6 (12.6)	63.7 (17.6)	72.7 (22.6)	71.3 (21.8)	61.8 (16.6)	48.8 (9.3)	35.8 (2.1)	24.9 (−3.9)	47.5 (8.6)
Mean daily minimum °F (°C)	16.7 (−8.5)	20.2 (−6.6)	28.9 (−1.7)	34.4 (1.3)	41.6 (5.3)	48.7 (9.3)	56.2 (13.4)	55.2 (12.9)	46.7 (8.2)	36.4 (2.4)	26.6 (−3.0)	17.9 (−7.8)	35.8 (2.1)
Mean minimum °F (°C)	−2.5 (−19.2)	1.3 (−17.1)	13.3 (−10.4)	22.1 (−5.5)	28.4 (−2.0)	36.2 (2.3)	46.3 (7.9)	43.5 (6.4)	33.0 (0.6)	21.5 (−5.8)	8.8 (−12.9)	−0.7 (−18.2)	−6.4 (−21.3)
Record low °F (°C)	−23 (−31)	−27 (−33)	−7 (−22)	12 (−11)	20 (−7)	29 (−2)	36 (2)	31 (−1)	20 (−7)	3 (−16)	−20 (−29)	−28 (−33)	−28 (−33)
Average precipitation inches (mm)	1.94 (49)	1.82 (46)	2.12 (54)	2.46 (62)	2.55 (65)	1.40 (36)	0.57 (14)	0.76 (19)	1.45 (37)	1.80 (46)	1.51 (38)	1.87 (47)	20.25 (514)
Average snowfall inches (cm)	12.9 (33)	12.7 (32)	8.9 (23)	4.0 (10)	0.5 (1.3)	0.0 (0.0)	0.0 (0.0)	0.0 (0.0)	0.0 (0.0)	1.3 (3.3)	6.6 (17)	15.4 (39)	62.3 (158)
Average precipitation days (≥ 0.01 in)	11.5	10.4	10.5	10.9	11.3	5.8	3.9	4.9	5.9	7.7	9.1	12.0	103.9
Average snowy days (≥ 0.1 in)	5.7	4.7	3.5	1.5	0.3	0.0	0.0	0.0	0.0	0.4	2.8	5.5	24.4
Source: NOAA

== Demographics ==
Historical population
Census	Pop.	Note	%±
1870	817		—
1880	1,198		46.6%
1890	1,232		2.8%
1900	1,111		−9.8%
1910	1,562		40.6%
1920	1,396		−10.6%
1930	1,140		−18.3%
1940	1,131		−0.8%
1950	1,091		−3.5%
1960	977		−10.4%
1970	1,000		2.4%
1980	1,705		70.5%
1990	1,955		14.7%
2000	2,051		4.9%
2010	2,470		20.4%
2020	2,914		18.0%

=== 2020 census ===
As of the 2020 census, Richmond had a population of 2,914 and a median age of 30.7 years. 34.6% of residents were under the age of 18 and 11.7% of residents were 65 years of age or older. For every 100 females there were 101.1 males, and for every 100 females age 18 and over there were 99.1 males age 18 and over.

0.0% of residents lived in urban areas, while 100.0% lived in rural areas.

There were 891 households in Richmond, of which 46.1% had children under the age of 18 living in them. Of all households, 70.1% were married-couple households, 12.8% were households with a male householder and no spouse or partner present, and 14.0% were households with a female householder and no spouse or partner present. About 15.9% of all households were made up of individuals and 7.1% had someone living alone who was 65 years of age or older.

There were 913 housing units, of which 2.4% were vacant. The homeowner vacancy rate was 0.5% and the rental vacancy rate was 0.0%.

Racial composition as of the 2020 census
Race	Number	Percent
White	2,718	93.3%
Black or African American	3	0.1%
American Indian and Alaska Native	21	0.7%
Asian	1	0.0%
Native Hawaiian and Other Pacific Islander	7	0.2%
Some other race	76	2.6%
Two or more races	88	3.0%
Hispanic or Latino (of any race)	154	5.3%

=== 2000 census ===
As of the 2000 census, there were 2,051 people, 619 households, and 526 families residing in the city. The population density was 696.1 inhabitants per square mile (268.8/km^{2}). There were 654 housing units at an average density of 222.0 per square mile (85.7/km^{2}).

There were 619 households, out of which 49.9% had children under the age of 18 living with them, 73.5% were married couples living together, 8.1% had a female householder with no husband present, and 14.9% were non-families. 13.7% of all households were made up of individuals, and 6.9% had someone living alone who was 65 years of age or older. The average household size was 3.31 and the average family size was 3.68.

In the city, the population was spread out, with 37.3% under the age of 18, 9.9% from 18 to 24, 25.5% from 25 to 44, 19.2% from 45 to 64, and 8.1% who were 65 years of age or older. The median age was 27 years. For every 100 females, there were 98.2 males. For every 100 females age 18 and over, there were 98.5 males.

The median income for a household in the city was $42,138, and the median income for a family was $45,500. Males had a median income of $31,743 versus $21,778 for females. The per capita income for the city was $14,312. About 5.8% of families and 6.7% of the population were below the poverty line, including 6.8% of those under age 18 and 7.7% of those age 65 or over.

== Economy ==
Cache Valley's first two creameries—Cache Valley Dairy and Union Creamery—were located in Richmond, each produced up to 40,000 lb (18,000 kg) of milk per day in 1902. The creameries were absorbed by Utah Condensed Milk Company in 1904, and then reorganized as Sego Milk Products in 1920. For many years, the plant was the largest operation west of the Mississippi. The factory remained in operations under different names and owners until 1984, closing due primarily to environmental issues.

Before the 2008 Financial Crises, Richmond had a decent downtown business lifestyle, with a grocery store, Wells Fargo bank, café, liquor store, Maverik gas station, and a fast-food chain. During the crises, the grocery store and bank closed, with other small businesses following suet.

Between 2008-2022, Richmond struggled to gain any substantial businesses in the city, especial in its downtown. During the 2020 COVID-19 pandemic, Richmond City opened a corner of the city park for food trucks, but it was not used until 2023.

In 2016, supermarket chain Lee's Marketplace announced the construction of a grocery store in Richmond, but construction did not start until 2022 and completed the following year. After its construction, many businesses started opening, such as a Dollar Tree, a pharmacy, two Hispanic food businesses, and a soda shop. There is still no bank in Richmond.

Notable businesses located in and around Richmond include:

- Cherry Peak Resort, a nearby ski resort.
- Lower Food's, a meat processor.
- Pepperidge Farm, which opened a plant in Richmond in 1974, and produced over one million cases of Goldfish in 2011. In 2023, Pepperidge Farm said they would be initiating a $160 million upgrade.

== Arts and culture ==
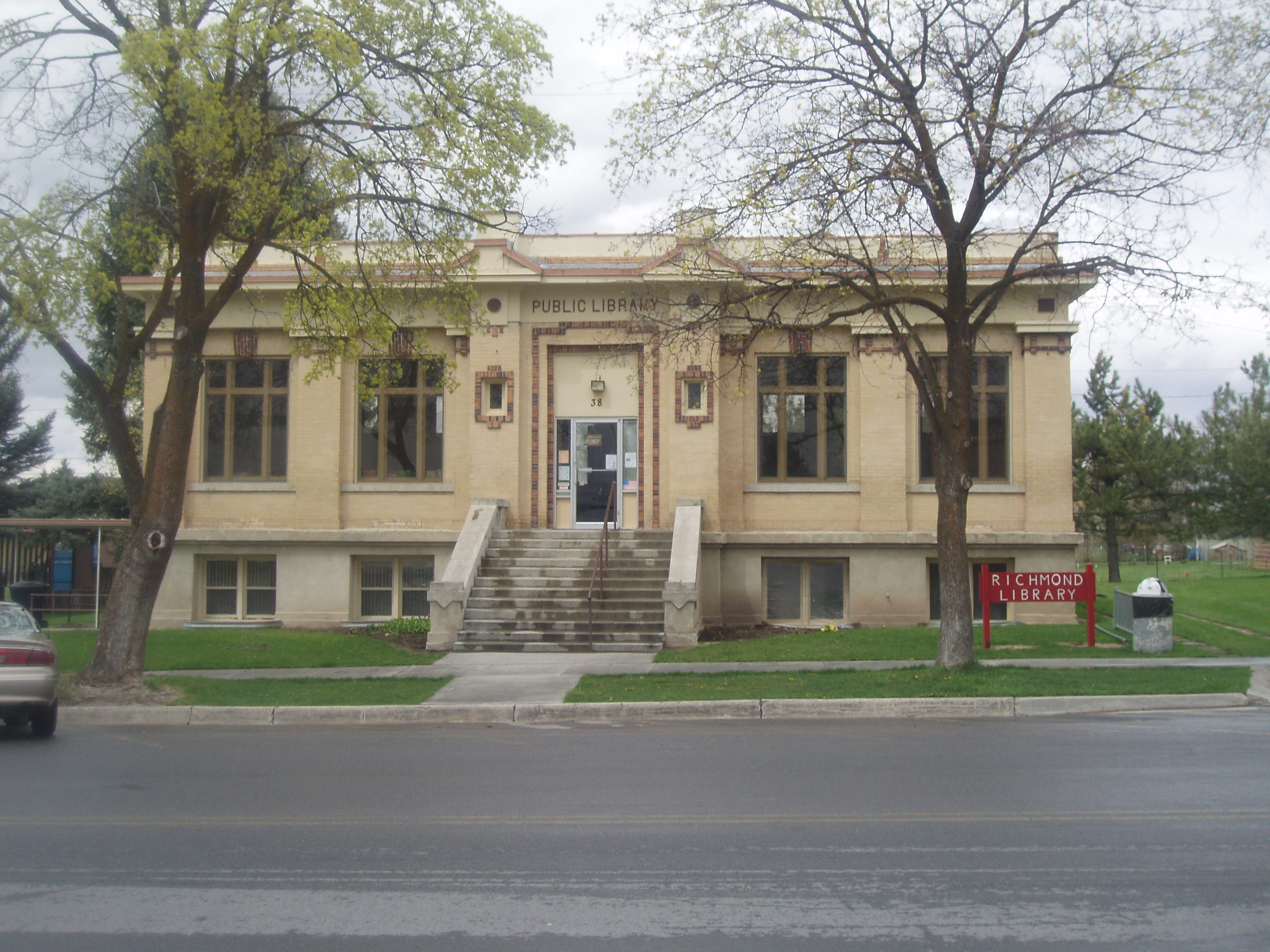
Richmond Utah Carnegie Library is included on the National Register of Historic Places

=== Landmarks ===
Landmarks in Richmond, including the Richmond Fort Marker, the headstone of Marriner W. Merrill, and the Richmond Veterans Memorial. The hillside letters "NC" (for "North Cache" High School) are visible on a mountainside east of Richmond at 41.9243°N 111.7867°W.

In 1912, an election was held about adding a Carnegie library. The Richmond Carnegie Library was built on Main Street in 1914.

The Richmond Relief Society Hall and the Richmond Tithing Office are museums operated by the local Daughters of Utah Pioneers. The Relief Society Hall is one of the oldest known original Relief Society Halls existing in Utah. Richmond has 17 listed buildings in the National Register of Historic Places (second most in the valley just behind Logan) and over 45 local historic buildings.

=== Black and White Days ===
Holstein Friesian cattle were brought to Richmond in 1904, and thrived so well that the town was recognized as Utah's Holstein center. In 1912, a Holstein Cow Show was organized. After a nationwide hoof-and-mouth disease outbreak in 1913 and 1914, the cattle show has been an annual event since 1915. Now called Richmond's "Black and White Days", the show features carnival rides, food vendors, a horse pull, and a parade, and is the United States' longest running cattle show.

=== Civil Organizations ===
In 1907, Susa Young Gates, the 4th President of the Daughters of Utah Pioneers (DUP), organized a camp in Richmond. The Richmond DUP is the longest running Camp and the longest running non-profit historical preservation group in Cache Valley. It was renamed the James and Drusilla Hendricks Camp in 2006.

In 1929, the Richmond Lions Club was organized, and continues to participate in civic events.

== Parks and recreation ==
Parks and recreational sites include Richmond City Grandstand and Baseball Field, a public horse arena with benches, an outdoor shooting range, and the Richmond Community Building.

== Education ==
Education in Richmond is over the Cache School District, with White Pine Elementary on the north side of Richmond. All students in grades 7-8 in the north end of Cache School District attend North Cache Middle School, and advance to Sky View High School in Smithfield, Utah, or Green Canyon High School in North Logan, Utah.

== Media ==
In 1971, Richmond resident Arthur Morin and 11 of his children drove 2,700 miles (4,300 km) in a camper to Lehigh Acres, Florida, to compete as finalists in the All American Family competition.

In 2003, part of the film Napoleon Dynamite was filmed in Richmond's Big J's fast-food restaurant.

In 2006, Richmond resident Sue Morgan was the first woman from Utah to compete in the Iditarod Trail Sled Dog Race.

In 2020, the Rezzimax Pain Tuner Pro, invented in Richmond, was named "Coolest Thing Made In Utah".

In a 2025 Utah Subcounty Estimate by the Kem C. Gardner Policy Institute at the University of Utah, Richmond was listed as the 7th fastest growing city in Utah.

== Notable people ==
- Herschel Bullen, businessman, politician and leader in the Church of Jesus Christ of Latter-day Saints.
- Dean Detton, American Professional Wrestler.
- Harrison T. Groutage, Artist and professor at Utah State University.
- Paula Hawkins, U.S. senator from Florida; attended high school in Richmond.
- William Jasper Kerr, president of Oregon State University, Brigham Young College, and Utah State Agricultural College and signer of the Utah Constitution.
- Israel Keyes, serial killer.
- Marriner W. Merrill and son Joseph F. Merrill, both members of the Quorum of the Twelve Apostles of the Church of Jesus Christ of Latter-day Saints.
- Joseph Monson, architect, member of the Territorial Legislature and two terms in the Utah State House of Representatives, and pioneer of Richmond.
- Stillman Pond, farmer, harness maker, and member of the Second Quorum of Seventy of The Church of Jesus Christ of Latter-day Saints.
- Musician Leroy Robertson taught music at North Cache High School in Richmond.
- Thomas Levi Whittle, Mormon pioneer and early settler of Richmond.

== See also ==
- List of cities and towns in Utah
- Bear River Massacre
