= Thomas Levi Whittle =

Canadian Mormon missionary (1812–1868)

Thomas L. Whittle
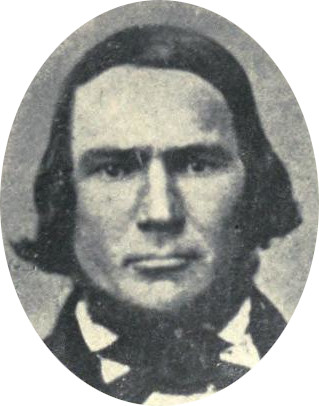
- Born: May 21, 1812; Mersea Township, Upper Canada
- Died: July 3, 1868 (aged 56)
- Known for: Mormon pioneer and missionary

Thomas Levi Whittle (May 21, 1812 – July 3, 1868) was a Canadian farmer who joined The Church of Jesus Christ of Latter-day Saints in 1837, later crossing the American Great Plains in 1848 among the first company of pioneers to enter and settle near Salt Lake City, Utah Territory. He was also a 49er, having been one of a small group of men called by Brigham Young to seek gold in California soon after its discovery in 1849, and one of the first missionaries for the Church to the Sandwich Islands, now Hawaii.

== Early life and conversion ==
Whittle was born to Thomas Whittle and Elizabeth Levi in Mersea Township, Essex County, Upper Canada. Whittle married Mary Amelia Fullmer in 1833, and after a few years, moved to Detroit, Michigan.

Whittle and his family heard Mormonism preached by early Latter Day Saint missionaries, and on November 22, 1837, Whittle and his wife were baptized members of the Church of Jesus Christ of Latter-Day Saints by Zera Pulsipher. As was common in the early days of the Latter-day Saint movement, Whittle was re-baptized by William Clayton on June 3, 1849 into the Church of Jesus Christ of Latter-day Saints (LDS Church) after Whittle and his family had reached the Salt Lake Valley.

Whittle's wife witnessed the important event in Latter Day Saint history when Brigham Young spoke to a large group of Latter Day Saints during the succession crisis and reportedly took on the appearance and speech of the recently martyred Joseph Smith. This event signified to many that Young should be the next leader of the church.

Shortly before making the trek west, Whittle and his wife Mary received temple ordinances in the Nauvoo Temple on January 1, 1846.

== Journey West ==
Whittle and his family made the journey to Winter Quarters, Nebraska to what is now the state of Utah among the first pioneers to enter the Salt Lake Valley. The family traveled with the 2nd Company, 2nd Division under the leadership of Heber C. Kimball. They arrived September 20, 1848.

== Mission ==
Whittle was called on a mission in 1849 and headed to California. The following year, Whittle was assigned to the Sandwich Islands, now called the Hawaiian Islands. Whittle arrived in Honolulu on December 12, 1850 with nine other LDS missionaries: Henry W. Bigler, Hiram Blackwell, George Q. Cannon, Hiram Clark, John Dixon, Wm. Farrer, James Hawkins, James Keeler, and Thomas Morris. The small group of missionaries arrived aboard a small whaling vessel called the Imaum of Muscat. The mission to the Sandwich Islands did not last long for Whittle and some of his companions as the Hawaiian language and reception proved very difficult. Whittle returned home and the Whittle family moved to Herriman, Utah. Later, the Whittle family helped settle Richmond, Utah.

Whittle died July 3, 1868. To pay tribute to Whittle, the Utah Territorial flag was flown at half-staff on July 4, 1868.
