= Richmond Carnegie Library =

Coordinates: 41°55′23″N 111°48′32″W

- U.S. National Register of Historic Places
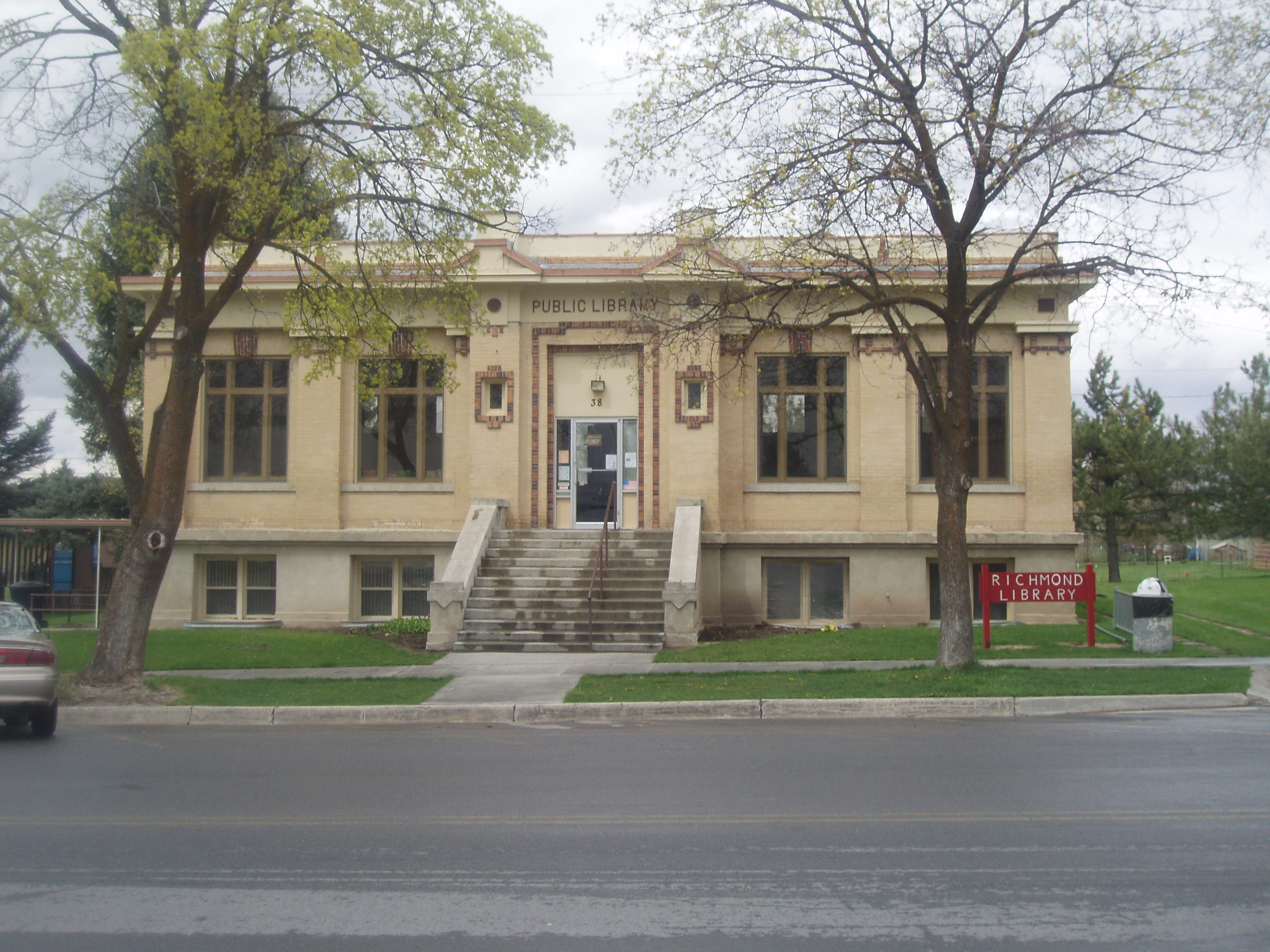
- The building in 2010

- Location within Utah Location within the United States
- Location: 6 West Main Street, Richmond, Utah
- Area: less than one acre
- Built: {1913
- Built by: August S. Schow
- Architect: Watkins & Birch
- Architectural style: Classical Revival
- MPS: Carnegie Library TR
- NRHP reference No.: 84000147
- Added to NRHP: October 25, 1984

The Richmond Carnegie Library is a historic one-story building in Richmond, Utah. It was built as a Carnegie library in 1913-1914 by August S. Schow, and designed in the Classical Revival style by Watkins & Birch, an architectural firm based in Provo. It has been listed on the National Register of Historic Places since October 25, 1984.
