= John W. Taylor (Mormon) =

Mormon apostle (1858–1916)

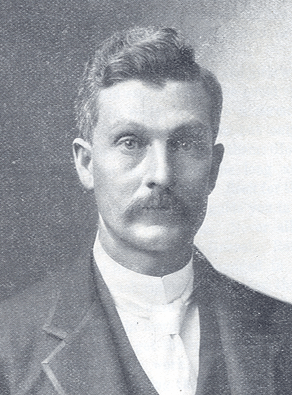

Quorum of the Twelve Apostles
- April 9, 1884 – April 1905
- End reason: Resigned from Quorum in opposition to church's stance against plural marriage

LDS Church Apostle
- April 9, 1884 – March 28, 1911
- Reason: Death of Charles C. Rich
- End reason: Excommunicated for opposition to church's stance against plural marriage
- Reorganization at end of term: No apostles ordained

Personal details
- Born: John Whittaker Taylor; May 15, 1858; Provo, Utah Territory, United States
- Died: October 10, 1916 (aged 58); Forest Dale, Utah, United States
- Cause of death: Stomach cancer
- Resting place: Salt Lake City Cemetery; 40°46′37.92″N 111°51′28.8″W
- Spouse(s): 6
- Parents: John Taylor; Sophia Whitaker

John Whittaker Taylor (May 15, 1858 – October 10, 1916) was a member of the Quorum of the Twelve Apostles of the Church of Jesus Christ of Latter-day Saints (LDS Church) and was the son of John Taylor, the church's third president. While he was an apostle, Taylor was excommunicated from the LDS Church for opposing the church's abandonment of plural marriage. He was subsequently posthumously re-baptized in 1965. He was also reinstated to his position in the Quorum of the Twelve Apostles.

== Family and occupation ==
John W. Taylor was born in Provo, Utah Territory, while his parents, John Taylor and Sophia Whitaker, were taking shelter there, along with other church members, during the Utah War. He married May Leona Rich (daughter of John Taylor Rich and Agnes Young) on October 19, 1882, and moved to Cassia County, Idaho, to ranch. As a practitioner of plural marriage, Taylor later married Nellie Todd, Janet Maria Wooley, Eliza Roxie Welling, Rhoda Welling, and Ellen Georgina Sandberg. He also worked as a county clerk and a newspaper editor.

Taylor's son, Samuel, became his biographer and a prolific writer of fiction and non-fiction.

== Church service and conflict ==
In the LDS Church, Taylor was ordained as a deacon around 1872 and as a teacher in 1874. He also served as missionary in the United States, Canada, and England. Taylor was called as an apostle and member of the church's Quorum of the Twelve Apostles by his father. He was ordained on April 9, 1884, his 26th birthday.

Taylor was a staunch believer in the doctrine of plural marriage, and had in total six wives and 36 children. Although the church officially forbade new plural marriages with the 1890 Manifesto, when Taylor had three wives, he continued to privately marry additional wives. Under pressure, he submitted his resignation from the Quorum of the Twelve on October 28, 1905. Matthias F. Cowley also resigned from the Quorum at the same time over the plural marriage dispute. The following February, Marriner W. Merrill died. In the April general conference of 1906, the resignations of Cowley and Taylor were presented to and accepted by the general church membership. As a result, three new apostles were called to replace them and Merrill: George F. Richards, Orson F. Whitney, and David O. McKay.

Taylor disputed with the Quorum of the Twelve often after his resignation. He was finally excommunicated on March 28, 1911 for continued opposition to the Second Manifesto. However, he remained a believer in Mormonism until his death. He died of stomach cancer at his home in Forest Dale, Salt Lake County, Utah, at age 58. He was buried in the Salt Lake City Cemetery.

Taylor was posthumously officially rebaptized by proxy and reinstated into the church and on May 21, 1965, received the ordinance of Restoration of Blessings by proxy under the hands of Joseph Fielding Smith, president of the Quorum of the Twelve Apostles, with the unanimous approval of the First Presidency and Quorum of the Twelve Apostles.

== Honors ==
The Taylor Stake of the LDS Church, which was headquartered in Raymond, Alberta, was named in Taylor's honor. As an apostle, Taylor had made considerable efforts to assist the Latter-day Saint settlers in Canada. The Taylor Stake was renamed the Raymond Alberta Stake in the 1970s.

In the 2000s, the town of Raymond built a street named Taylor Street in his honor. An LDS Church chapel was built on the street, and it is named the Taylor Street Chapel.

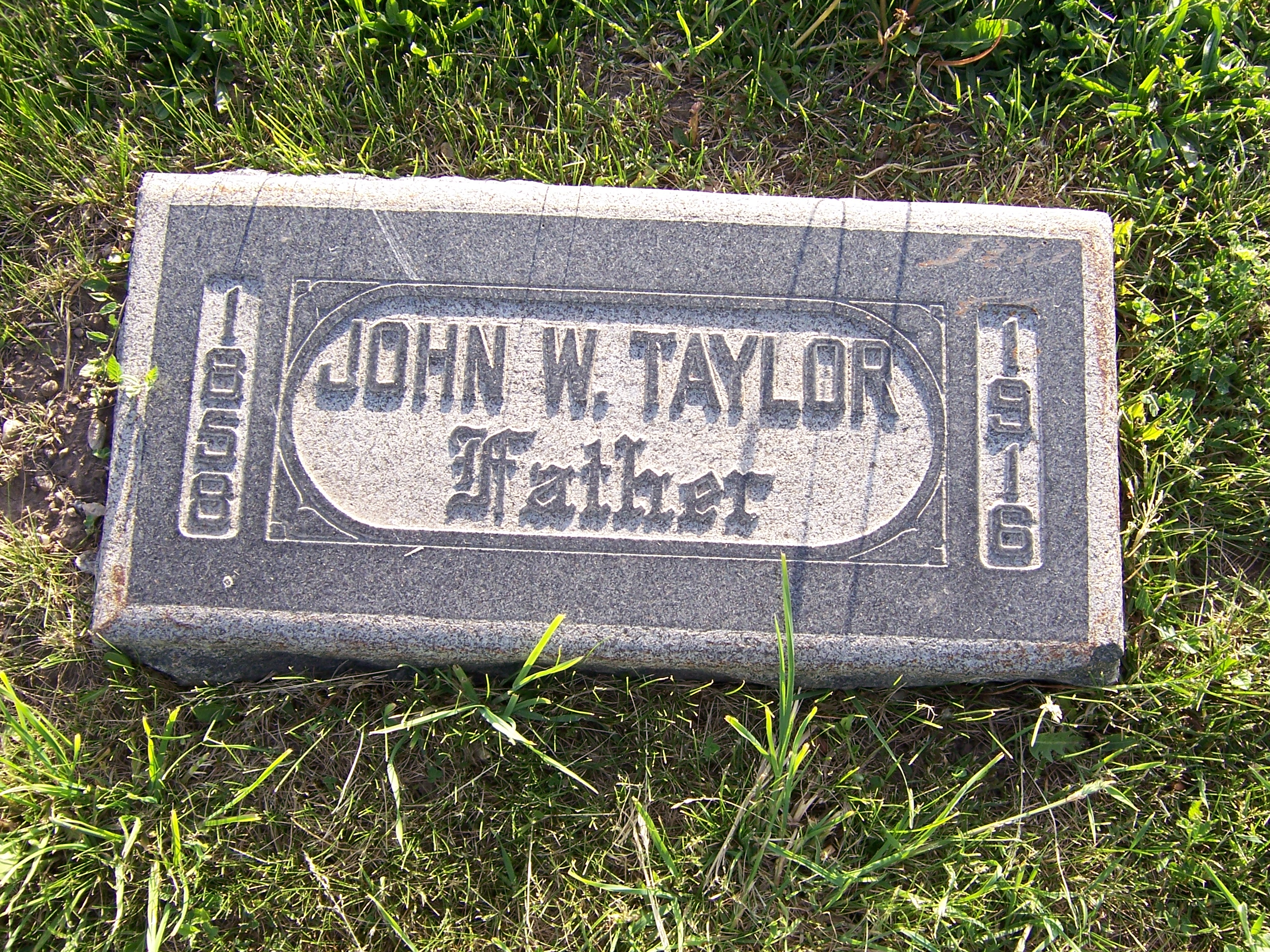
Grave marker of John W. Taylor.

== See also ==
- 1886 Revelation
- The Church of Jesus Christ of Latter-day Saints in Canada
- Reed Smoot hearings

== Notes ==
Religious titles
Preceded by Heber J. Grant	Quorum of the Twelve Apostles; April 9, 1884 – April 1905	Succeeded by Marriner W. Merrill
