= Marriner W. Merrill =

American pioneer and religious leader (1832–1906)

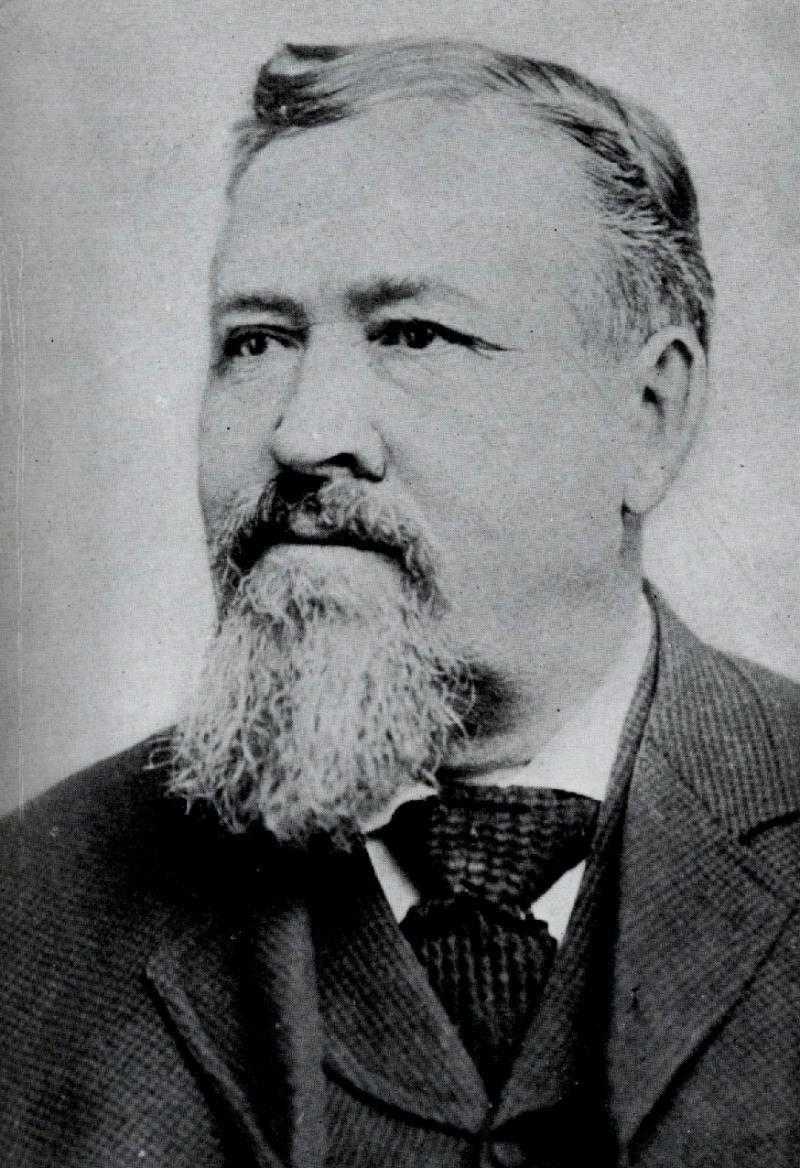

Quorum of the Twelve Apostles
- 7 October 1889 – 6 February 1906

LDS Church Apostle
- 7 October 1889 – 6 February 1906
- Reason: Excommunication of Albert Carrington; death of John Taylor and reorganization of the First Presidency; death of Erastus Snow
- Reorganization at end of term: George F. Richards, Orson F. Whitney, and David O. McKay ordained

Personal details
- Born: Marriner Wood Merrill; 25 September 1832; Sackville, New Brunswick
- Died: 6 February 1906 (aged 73); Richmond, Utah, United States
- Cause of death: Bright's disease
- Spouse(s): 8
- Children: 46

Marriner Wood Merrill (25 September 1832 – 6 February 1906) was an American pioneer and religious leader. He was a pioneering settler of the Cache Valley and a member of the Quorum of the Twelve Apostles of the Church of Jesus Christ of Latter-day Saints (LDS Church).

Merrill was born in Sackville, New Brunswick, the tenth of thirteen children born to Sarah Ann Reynolds and Nathan Merrill. The family farmed, and Merrill later wrote of "not having any opportunities of even a common school education." Merrill left Sackville and worked briefly as a cook on a fishing schooner based in Boston, Massachusetts, before returning on word of his father's fatal fall into a tidal marsh in May 1851. Merrill assisted in farm work in Sackville after his return.

Merrill joined the LDS Church in April 1852. He migrated to Salt Lake City, Utah Territory, the following year in a wagon company led by William Atkinson, also of Sackville. During his first winter in Utah, Merrill married Sarah Ann Atkinson, the daughter of William Atkinson. Merrill at first engaged in farm labor and made shingles. The Merrills briefly relocated to Spanish Fork before the arrival of Johnston's Army in the Utah War.

In 1860, Merrill was among the first settlers to move to Richmond, Utah, where he soon became a civic and ecclesiastical leader. In July 1861, he began eighteen years of service as a bishop in the LDS Church. He became the postmaster of Richmond in 1866 and was a county selectman from 1872 to 1879. Merrill was also a member of the territorial legislature for two terms.

With two business partners, Merrill built a gristmill. He also worked as a contractor in the construction of the Utah and Northern Railway and as a supervisor in its operation. Merrill also operated a large farm near Richmond.

Merrill was called as a member of the Cache Stake presidency in 1879. He was first a counsellor to William B. Preston, then after 1884 was a counselor to Charles Ora Card. Merrill became the first president of the Logan Temple in 1884 and a member of the Quorum of the Twelve Apostles on 7 October 1889. He served as both an apostle and temple president until his death.

Like many early leaders in the LDS Church, Merrill practiced plural marriage. He married his second wife, Cyrene Standley, on 5 June 1856, and married Maria Loenza Kingsbury, granddaughter of noted Mormon pioneer Stillman Pond and mother of future Apostle Joseph F. Merrill, in 1867. Marriner eventually married eight wives and had 46 children. During the time of the polygamy raids in Utah Territory, Merrill lived in his bedroom on the second floor in the west tower of the Logan Temple; for weeks at a time, he would not leave the temple. He was arrested for unlawful cohabitation on 10 January 1889, but was released within two days without being convicted.

Merrill married his eighth wife, Swedish immigrant Hilda Maria Erickson, after the 1890 Manifesto announced the discontinuation of plural marriage. He is alleged also to have advocated for and performed post-Manifesto plural marriages. Merrill was summoned twice as a witness before the United States Congress during the Smoot investigation, but declined, citing poor health. He received the last subpoena just days before his death. Later, Merrill's son Charles gave testimony before the Congressional hearing.

On 6 February 1906, Merrill died in his home in Richmond from Bright's disease. He is buried in Richmond.

At a family reunion in 1935, his descendants numbered 797, of which 291 were grandchildren, 429 great-grandchildren and 31 great-great grandchildren. In 1969, his descendants numbered 7,000 "living in all parts of the world." Many of his descendants still live in the Cache Valley.

== Notes ==
- Esshom, Frank Ellwood (1913), "Merrill, Marriner Wood", Pioneers and Prominent Men of Utah, Salt Lake City: Utah Pioneers Book Publishing Company, pp. 1034–1035, OCLC 2286984

Religious titles
Preceded by John W. Taylor	Quorum of the Twelve Apostles; October 7, 1889 – February 6, 1906	Succeeded by Anthon H. Lund
