= Stillman Pond =

American farmer

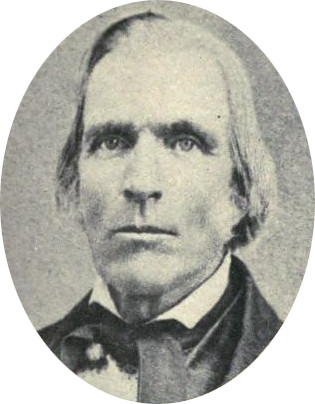

Second Quorum of Seventy
- May 17, 1845 – February 16, 1853
- Called by: Brigham Young
- End reason: Honorably released because of his calling and setting apart as Senior President of the 35th Quorum of Seventy.

Senior President of Thirty-fifth Quorum of Seventy
- February 16, 1853 – September 30, 1878
- Called by: Brigham Young
- End reason: Death.

Personal details
- Born: October 26, 1803; Hubbardston, Massachusetts, United States
- Died: September 30, 1878 (aged 74); Richmond, Utah Territory, United States

Stillman Pond (October 26, 1803 – September 30, 1878) – a farmer, harnessmaker, and land speculator by trade, and a native of Hubbardston, Worcester, Massachusetts – was a Mormon pioneer and church leader recognized for the great personal sacrifices he made in the Mormon exodus from Nauvoo, Illinois, to the Great Basin's Salt Lake Valley (September 1846 – September 1847), in what would later become Utah Territory.

== Time in Massachusetts and Conversion ==
Stillman Pond was the descendant of colonial New England progenitors of the Puritan persuasion, many of whom served as ministers and selectmen of various townships. The Massachusetts native was born only two years before the birth of the prophet Joseph Smith, Jr., with whom he shared a common ancestry (in separatist minister John Lathrop, 1584–1653) and whose fledgling American religion he would one day embrace.

While Stillman's paternal grandfather, Joseph Pond (b. 1756) was a Revolutionary War soldier, his great-great-grandfather Ezra Pond (b. 1692) was a pastor of a local Franklin, Massachusetts congregation. In the Puritan spirit of Roger Williams and Anne Hutchinson, Ezra refused to comply with the orders of the community elders, and he was forced to leave town, moving with his family to Hubbardston. Stillman's maternal great-great-grandfather was Lt. Paul Moore (b. 1711), an American army commander at the Battle of Bunker Hill.

Marrying Almyra Whittemore in 1825, he moved to Westminster, Worcester, Massachusetts, where he purchased several tracts of land. There he remained until 1832, when he moved to Templeton. Almyra bore him 5 children (four girls and one boy), but at age 33 she died in the yellow fever epidemic that swept through New England in 1833 and was buried at Hubbardston.

Single-story red brick home of Lorin Farr, a Pond family neighbor, on Durphy Street (south of Wilford Woodruff's home), block 106, Nauvoo, Illinois.

A young widower now with five children, Stillman Pond would ultimately marry four more times. Marrying again in 1834 to Maria Louisa Davis, Stillman settled again at Hubbardston, but moved his family in 1837 to New Salem, Massachusetts, purchasing there three tracts of land over the next five years. There, he and his family fostered new friendships, including with the Haskell family (later reuniting with them at Nauvoo). Most significantly, it was at New Salem in 1841 that Stillman and his family welcomed into their home travelling Mormon missionaries and were converted, through their efforts, to the new faith that Smith had founded a decade earlier. The family was baptized on December 28, 1841 under the hand of Elder Elias Harris. The Mormon message, spurred Pond to join the Missouri-driven Latter-day Saints at Nauvoo, Illinois. Pond and his family, having embraced 'the New Covenant' and sold their land, made their trek in the fall of 1843.

Heber C. Kimball home, on the corner of Partridge & Munson Streets, just west of the site of the Stillman Pond store and residence, Nauvoo, Illinois.

== Nauvoo merchant, Elder and Seventy ==
In the would-be refuge of the 'City Beautiful' Stillman built a two-story red brick home (in the front part of which he established a store) a few blocks southwest of the Nauvoo Temple on Munson Street (block 106).

Their new neighbor, as Stillman soon discovered, was a latter-day Apostle of the Lord, for not only did the edifice lay but 'a few rods' west of the homes of friends and fellow converts Winslow Farr and his son Lorin, but also just east of the historic red-brick residence of Mormon Apostle Heber C. Kimball – confidante and councilor to the Mormon Prophet of the Restoration, Joseph Smith, Jr. Another apostle, moreover, resided on the same block – Wilford Woodruff – whose red-brick home stood just north of the Farr homes on Durphy Street.

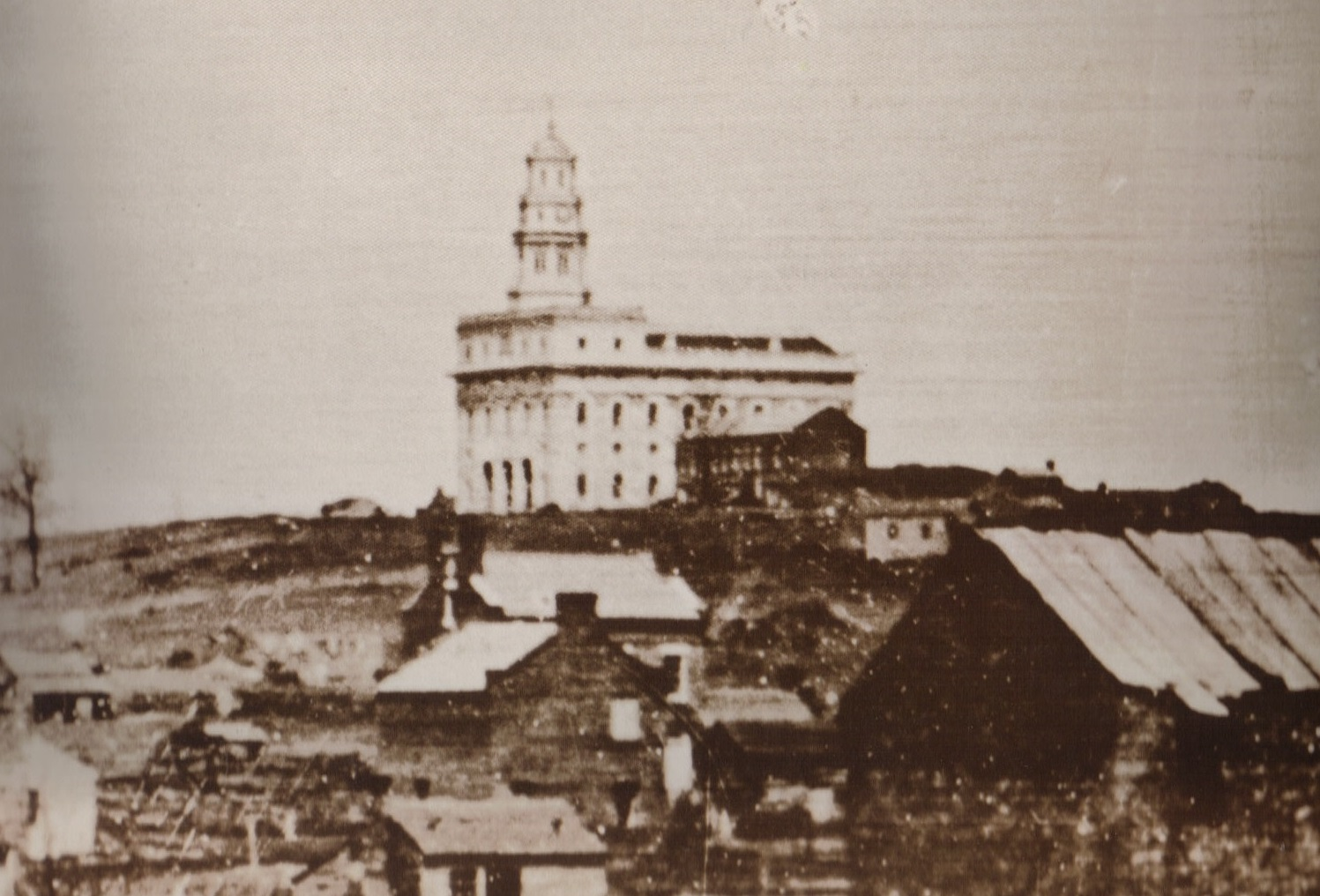
The Nauvoo Temple upon a high bluff overlooking the city, c. 1846

The Pond family home & store (1843–1846) was thus situated west of the intersection at Durphy and Munson Streets (its site excavated in 1970 by Nauvoo Restoration Inc.) – on the same 4-acre 'lower city' lot where, in their restored incarnations, the historic Kimball, Woodruff, and Farr homes can be seen today (the Winslow Farr home is at the intersection's northwest corner).

Ordained an Elder of the church in July 1844 (only weeks after the Prophet Joseph's martyrdom), Stillman received his patriarchal blessing under the hands of the Prophet's uncle, John Smith, on January 1, 1845, and that same year (17 May) became a member of the church's 2nd Quorum of Seventy, receiving also with his wife (and his first wife by proxy) the ordinance of the holy Endowment in the still unfinished Nauvoo Temple on December 30.

Stillman, on February 12, 1846, wrote: 'I am perfectly satisfied with the authorities of the Church and consider it my indispensable duty to give heed to all things.' Not long after, his young married housekeeper Irene Haskell Pomeroy – who assisted Sister Pond in her ongoing recuperation following the tragic January 1845 death of infant son Charles Stillman Pond – observed firsthand Stillman's commitment to that personal mandate: 'Team after team is going over the river every day for the west ... Brother Pond has gone to help some over the river ...'

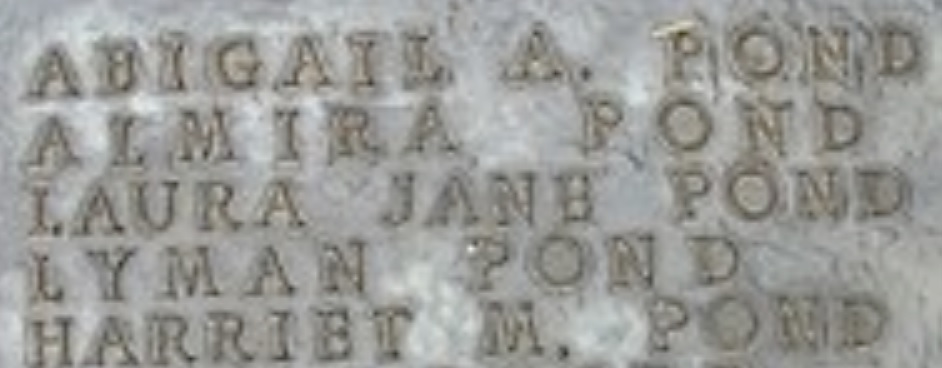
Pond family memorial, 'Tragedy of Winter Quarters' Monument, Omaha, Nebraska.

== Faithful flight: Winter Quarters tragedy & Mormon trek West ==
The Pond family--after persecution and the Battle of Nauvoo--left the city in 1846, being one of the last families to leave. Stillman's family (including Maria, who was pregnant with twins), together with the other Mormon exiles, headed onto Winter Quarters, Nebraska.

Living in tents on the Nebraska bank of the Missouri River during the John Taylor-led 1847 trek across the Great Plains to Utah's Salt Lake basin Pond's wife and 8 children succumbed to illness. Their infant son Charles previosuly dying in Nauvoo, 9-year-old son Lowell Ansen Pond and Maria's newborn twin sons dying as a result of malaria. They honored the infants with the names of the martyred Smith brothers, Joseph and Hyrum. All three sons were buried along the trail in shallow graves in the frozen ground.

The deaths of four additional Pond children also occurred after the family's October 16 arrival at the Nebraska encampment, with three of the Ponds' daughters all dying within one five-day period alone--also as a result of illness. This was recorded in the journals of pioneers Horace K. Whitney and Helen Mar Kimball Whitney:

'On Wednesday, the 2nd of December 1846, Laura Jane Pond, age 14 years, ... died of chills and fever.' Two days later on 'Friday, the 4th of December 1846, Harriet M. Pond, age 11 years, ... died with chills.' Three days later, 'Monday, the 7th of December, 1846, Abigail A. Pond, age 18 years [and a plural bride of Presiding Bishop Newel K. Whitney] ... died with chills.' Just five weeks later, 'Friday, the 15th of January, 1847, Lyman Pond, age 6 years, ... died with chills and fever.'

Ursula Billings Hastings Haskell, fellow 'Camp of Israel' saint, and friend of the Pond family from their New Salem days together (and whose housekeeper-daughter Irene had boarded in an apartment in Stillman's Nauvoo home), later wrote in a letter: 'I suppose you have heard of the deaths in Brother Ponds family. The children are all dead but Elizabeth and Loenza.' Sister Haskell then explained in her letter that the family became ill before arriving at Winter Quarters when Brother Pond paused to earn some money for his family's survival in an unhealthy location, 'a very sickly town' out of the way. 'Lowell died before they arrived, the rest lived to get here and then dropped away one after another. Sister Pond has not recovered and I fear she never will.'

All of the marked Pond siblings died over an 8-month period in the harsh conditions of their environment, including, finally, on May 17, 1847, Maria herself (who, though weakened by malaria, ultimately died of 'consumption' or tuberculosis). And Stillman, once more a widower, grieved for each of them. On too-frequent occasion, moreover, he found himself straddling the threshold of death. But 'the fire of the New Covenant' remained a strong motivating force for stillman, and it was that which, after leaving the Missouri River encampment on June 17, gave him the strength to continue to the mountains of the West, where he believed he would find the Zion that God had prepared for His saints.

== Abigail Thorn and a Prophet's mantle ==
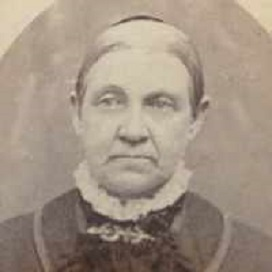
Abigail Thorn Pond (1821–1904)

Stillman's third wife, Abigail Thorn, whom he married at the Endowment House at Salt Lake City in 1849 and by whom he would have 8 additional children, was the abandoned plural spouse of Major Samuel Russell who had, only a year earlier, deserted Abigail and their own newborn infant in preference for the gold fields of California. Stillman had been a member of the same (combined Smoot-Wallace-Russell) 'Camp of Israel' company as the Russells in the trek to Utah (arriving September 25, 1847), and he had since established himself in farming to the west of the city, where he'd witnessed the saving of his locust-infested crops in 1848 by the miraculous arrival of seagulls.

For her part, Abigail – born into a respected family at Lair, Cayuga, New York, on April 2, 1821 – had experienced a conversion to the Mormon faith as a young woman, motivating her to join the growing community in Nauvoo. There, at the age of 22, she received in the spring of 1843 her patriarchal blessing under the hands of Hyrum Smith, the Prophet's brother, just fifteen months before his martyrdom at Carthage. Hyrum, then, "blessed her" with "the gift of dreams and visions by the Holy Ghost" (she would also enjoy in her life the gift of tongues and a keen discernment of spirits). She witnessed at Nauvoo on August 8, 1844, as scores of accounts that were recorded at the time attest, the transfiguration of Brigham Young, when the voice of the Prophet Joseph Smith fell upon him as a sign to the Saints of his high calling and acceptance of the Lord to lead His people.

== Pioneering at Spanish Fork and Cache Valley ==
Like Zebedee Coltrin and other Saints who preceded them, Stillman and Abigail removed south from Salt Lake to Spanish Fork in 1857. But less than three years later, in 1860, they turned back again, this time to Cache Valley's Richmond in the far north – just months before shots were fired at Fort Sumter in the East the following spring.

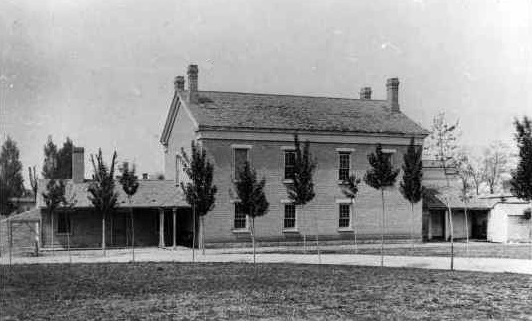
The Endowment House, est. 1855, Temple Block, Salt Lake City, Utah.

== Endowment officiator, Seventy's President and Apostolic mentoree ==
Stillman had been able to officiate in the Endowment House in Salt Lake City under the supervision of President Heber C. Kimball, but also, at the Council House, to be mentored in mathematics and astronomy in the evenings under Apostle Orson Pratt.

In 1852 Stillman had once again married, this time to Elizabeth Bessac, by whom he was given another child. But his fourth wife divorced him a few years later and married another man. On February 16, 1853 he was ordained Senior President of the 35th Quorum of Seventy, a position which he maintained for the rest of his life.

John Buxton & Mary Anner Pond

== Eldest son, ZCMI investor and St. George Temple laborer ==
On June 25, 1865 Pond received a second patriarchal blessing under the hand of Patriarch Charles W. Hyde – just weeks after the assassination of President Lincoln. (Stillman's eldest daughter by Abigail, Mary Anner Pond, only 4 weeks before Lincoln's death, had married John Buxton, an English immigrant who became a successful businessman in Teton Valley, Idaho; they raised 12 children).

Construction of the St. George Temple, 1871–1877. Stillman Pond was among the early Latter-day Saints who quarried stone for Utah's first Mormon temple, dedicated April 6, 1877 by President Brigham Young.

Three years after receiving his second patriarchal blessing, Stillman returned to his natal home of Hubbardston, Massachusetts, upon the occasion of his father's death. There, he secured his 'eldest' son's portion of his father's estate, returning again to Utah to invest his inheritance in the Richmond Co-op, known as the ZCMI – an investment that proved to be a wise and profitable one. In his later years, Stillman would travel south to St. George to assist in hauling quarry-stone for the building of a temple there.

== Final years and family legacy ==
In 1870 Stillman married for a fifth and final time. A widow, Anna Regina Svensson-Jacobsen (alternatively, 'Swenson'), bore him an additional four sons before his death at age 74 (after a two-year lingering illness) on September 30, 1878. Third wife Abigail died 26 years later on March 7, 1904.

Stillman would become grand-patriarch to many descendants scattered throughout the intermountain West.

The Church of Jesus Christ of Latter-day Saints titles
Preceded by	Member of 2nd Quorum of Seventy & Senior President of 35th Quorum of Seventy; May 17, 1845 – September 30, 1878	Succeeded by
