= Utah Constitutional Convention of 1895 =

Successful attempt by Utah to be admitted to the U.S.

In the history of Utah, the Utah Constitutional Convention was held from March 4, 1895 to May 8, 1895. The 1895 convention was the Utah Territory's seventh and final attempt to be admitted to the United States as a state. The Constitution of Utah was accepted by Congress and President Grover Cleveland, leading to Utah's admittance into the union as the 45th state on January 4, 1896.

== Background ==
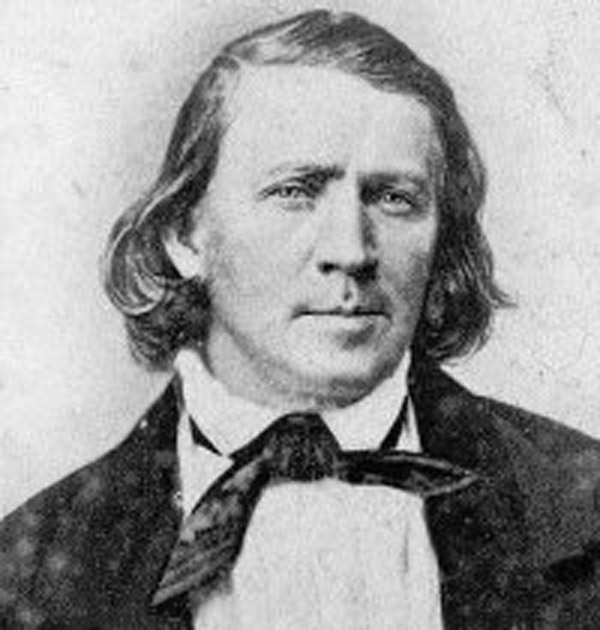
Brigham Young, Second President of the Church of Jesus Christ of Latter-day Saints and first governor of the Utah Territory

Since its early settlement by Mormon pioneers, Utah was unlike any other territory in the United States. Latter-day Saints, also called Mormons, had a history of moving from state-to-state in response to conflict and persecution. From its founding in New York in 1830, the Latter-day Saints had moved to Missouri, Ohio, and later Illinois, where they established the city of Nauvoo. When the church's founder and first President Joseph Smith was killed by a mob, Brigham Young led a large body of Latter-day Saints westward into Mexican territory along what is now known as the Mormon Trail. They arrived in what would become the Utah Territory in the summer of 1847.

In 1848, the land occupied by the Latter-day Saint settlers was part of the vast area acquired by the United States as a result of the Treaty of Guadalupe Hidalgo. The discovery of gold in California led to many Americans traveling through the area. These events marked an end to the Latter-day Saints' isolation from the United States. Latter-day Saint leaders quickly sought to become a United States territory, and statehood became the goal around 1849.

== Previous statehood applications ==
No other territory in the United States has had requests for statehood denied or ignored by Congress as many times as Utah. Utah's territorial government unsuccessfully applied for statehood six times before the Constitutional Convention of 1895. To Congress, Utah was un-American for several reasons, including theocracy, economy, polygamy, and slavery.

=== 1849 constitution ===
Map of the borders for the proposed State of Deseret and the actual border for the Territory of Utah.

The first attempt at a constitution was initially just to govern a territory, but leaders decided to apply for statehood instead in hopes of attaining greater autonomy, as territorial leaders would have been appointed by the United States President. The Council of Fifty, a political council originally established by Joseph Smith, produced the initial Constitution for the provisional State of Deseret. The Constitution was made up of eight articles and a preamble defining the proposed boundaries. The articles established three branches of government, limited voting rights to white men, and mentioned the separation of church as well as the freedom of religion. Slavery was not mentioned. The provisions on religion were written to persuade congress that the state would not be a Latter-day Saint theocracy.

Stephen A. Douglas presented the proposed Constitution before Congress, and John M. Bernhisel and Thomas L. Kane lobbied Congress for Utah statehood. While its request for statehood was denied, Utah did become a United States territory as part of the Compromise of 1850, and President Millard Fillmore appointed Brigham Young, who was still the president of the church, to be the governor of the territory. The territory's borders were considerably smaller than what was proposed, but still spanned across present-day Utah, Nevada, and a small portion of Colorado. At the time of application, United States Congress was busy trying to resolve the issue of slavery, but Utah's small population also contributed to its denial of statehood, as a minimum number of 60,000 eligible voters was a standard benchmark in creating a new state and Utah only had around 11,380 residents.

=== 1856 constitution ===
Discontent between the people of Utah and their federally appointed government leaders and judges contributed to another attempt at gaining statehood. This time, the people of Utah faced obstacles much greater than just having a small population; Two of the major roadblocks to statehood were the practices of slavery and polygamy, what Republicans referred to as the twin relics of barbarism. In 1852, Latter-day Saints openly acknowledged the practice of polygamy within the territory, igniting nationwide hostilities against them. Utah had also voted to become a slave territory in 1852 and remained one until Congress prohibited slavery in all U.S. territories in 1862. The statehood application was rejected, and President James Buchanan went on to accuse Brigham Young of being a theocratic dictator in Utah and stirring up an insurrection. Thousands of federal troops were sent to depose Young, leading to the Utah War, and resulted in Alfred Cumming replacing Young as the territorial governor. However, Brigham Young, still president of the Church of Jesus Christ of Latter-day Saints, retained great power in the Mormon-dominant population of Utah.

=== 1862 constitution ===
A third Constitution, virtually the same as the previous two, was sent to Congress and denied in 1862. That same year, Congress passed the Morrill Anti-Bigamy Act, which penalized anyone married to more than one spouse, disincorporated the Church, and limited the amount of property the Church could possess to $50,000. These measures were not thoroughly enforced. The Utah legislature sent a slightly altered version of the Constitution to Congress in 1867, but it was ignored.

=== 1872 constitution ===
By 1870, Utah had gained a population of over 86,000, despite having lost territory to the new state of Nevada. The demographics of the territory had changed as other people began pouring in, primarily because of mining opportunities in the Wasatch Mountains. In 1872 a constitutional convention was held to draw up a brand new constitution for the state of Deseret, one that could gain support from the increasing non-Mormon population. Beginning in the 1860's, Brigham Young pushed for Latter-day Saints to become more economically self-sufficient, which led to boycotts of non-Mormon businesses, adding to existing tensions.

The 1872 iteration of the constitution was more complex than the previous versions, having based much of it on Nevada's constitution. Utah had voted to allow women voting rights in 1870, and this constitution protected voting rights for men and women over the age of twenty-one. Legislation regarding education would be impartial to all, regardless of gender, citizenship-status, race, or religion. Slavery was officially outlawed, jury trial provisions amended, a state prison established, institutions for the disabled would be supported by the state, lending state money to companies and corporations would be prohibited, and the roster for voter-elected state officials would be expanded. A provision was also attached that, if the draft was accepted, allowed Congress to prescribe a condition of admission, possibly leaving room for the subject of polygamy to be debated later, though the Deseret News, a newspaper published by the church, denied the notion of giving up polygamy for statehood. Further, Congress' imposed provision would have to be approved in a territorial election, which was unlikely. This draft died in a House committee in congress, the fourth failed attempt at gaining statehood.

=== 1882 constitution ===
The fifth attempt at statehood saw a slightly revised version of the 1872 constitution. For the first time some of the convention's delegates were women, and the new draft was for the "Constitution of the State of Utah" rather than the State of Deseret. This convention was held just after the passage of the Edmunds Act, which strengthened the enforcement of the anti-polygamy laws in effect from the Morrill Anti-Bigamy Act. Once again, the draft failed in a congress committee. By this time, the Non-Mormon Liberal Party was actively opposing statehood, as it would give voting power to the Mormon electorate instead of having officials chosen by the federal government.

=== 1887 constitution ===
Pressure on the church came to an all-time high when Congress passed the Edmunds–Tucker Act early in 1887. Yet another amendment to the initial Edmunds Act, the Edmunds–Tucker Act disenfranchised women and anyone who supported polygamy, eliminated the Church's legal status, and would allow the government to seize church assets. In June 1887, the People's Party, composed mostly of Latter-day Saints, joined with the Liberal, Republican, and Democratic parties to draft another constitution, with great resistance from the Liberal party. The new draft included an anti-polygamy provision, while church leaders still clung to the practice. The new draft included provisions to veto parts of a bill, ten-year tax exemption status for mines, individual and corporate irrigation facilities would not be taxed, and strict limits on local government debt. Once again, the draft failed in congressional committee.

In 1890, Wilford Woodruff, the fourth President of the Church of Jesus Christ of Latter-day Saints, issued a manifesto in which the practice of polygamy was prohibited in the Utah territory. In the following years, the People's Party and the Liberal Party would disband. Church leaders were working with national Republican officials on progressing towards statehood.

== Enabling Act of 1894 ==
In 1892, Joseph L. Rawlins, a Democrat, won the election and became Utah's non-voting representative in congress. The following year, he introduced the Enabling Act and worked with both Republicans and Democrats until it was approved by Congress and signed by President Grover Cleveland on July 16, 1894. This act made it possible for Utah to organize another constitutional convention in which a Constitution and a state government would be made. It provided Utah a path to enter the Union as a State on equal footing with the other states. The Enabling Act also outlined how many delegates each county would be able to send to the convention, what day they would begin (March 4, 1895), and any other stipulations or provisions that must be included in the constitution in order for Utah to receive statehood. These provisions are outlined in Section 3 of the Act, and include the following:

That the delegates meet on the agreed date to organize a convention, and that on that day after they've officially organized they declare their support of the U.S. Constitution; and

That the constitution was formed as republican (no distinction in civil or political rights on account of race, doesn't contain anything that's in conflict with the US constitution, and people both from the United States government and from the citizens governed in the Utah territory agreeing to the new Utah State Constitution).

It also needed to include these four provisions:

1. Religious tolerance is observed and no person is treated poorly because of their religion (with the understanding that polygamy and plural marriages are prohibited forever).
2. Unappropriated public lands and lands held by Indian tribes in Utah will be under the jurisdiction of Congress, and the State of Utah will not tax Congress for land and property in Utah (but they may tax Indians who own land who have separated from their tribe).
3. Territory debts and liabilities shall be assumed by the State.
4. Public schools will be established and maintained, open to all and free from sectarian rule (see Education in Utah).

== 1895 Constitutional Convention ==
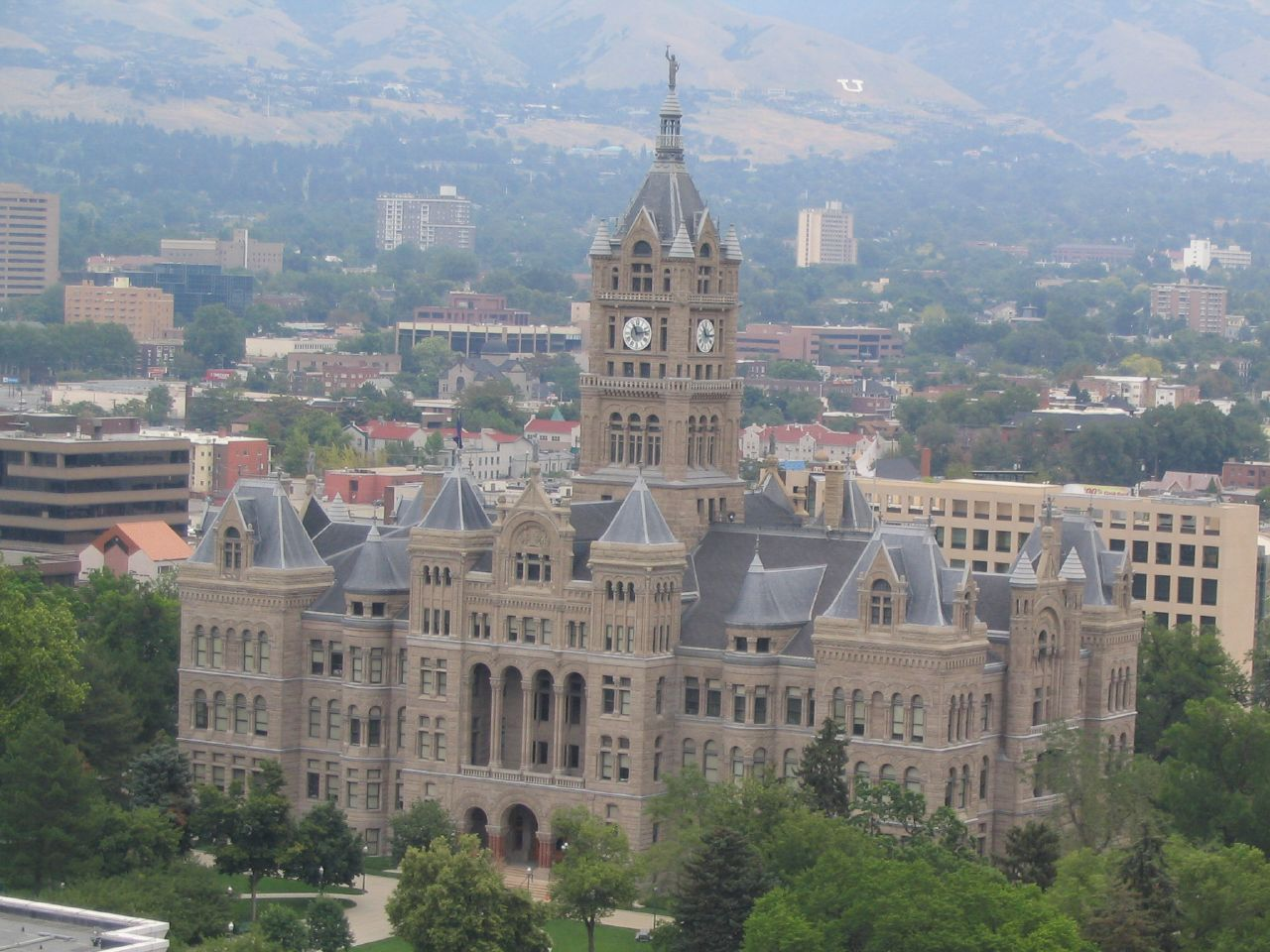
The Salt Lake City and County Building

The Utah Constitutional Convention of 1895 was made up of 107 delegates. The convention’s proceedings were held in a courtroom on the third floor of the Salt Lake City and County Building. Notable attendees include John Henry Smith, Parley P. Christensen, B. H. Roberts, Orson F. Whitney, Franklin S. Richards, Charles S. Varian,< C. C. Goodman, Karl G. Maeser, Lorin Farr, and Heber M. Wells (For a complete list of delegates, see List of Utah Constitutional Convention Delegates).

The first day of the convention was March 4, 1895, and the last day was May 8 of the same year, with delegates working on fifty-five days of the sixty-six day period.

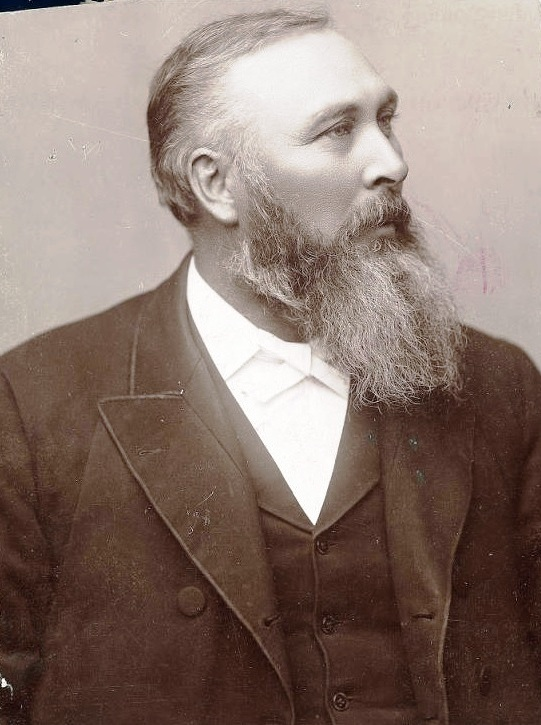
John Henry Smith, President of the 1895 Constitutional Convention

On the third day of the convention, John Henry Smith, an apostle in the church, was made permanent president of the assembly. The delay in choosing a permanent president of the assembly was the result of a vacancy in the five delegate seats from the third precinct of Salt Lake City. Utah delegates, not wanting to deny that portion of the population their representatives and risk failing to comply with the number of delegates listed in the Enabling Act, and still wanting to begin on March 4 as instructed, established a temporary president, James N. Kimball, on the second day of the convention.

There were a total of 33 committees organized for the convention. These ranged from committees in charge of logistical details (such as the Committee on Site and Furniture, the Committee on Stenographer, and the Committee on Standing Committees) to committees in charge of different sections of the constitution (like the Legislative, Judiciary, and Executive committees, and the Committee on the Preamble and Declaration of Rights).

Then there were the committees which dealt with a number of important topics relevant to their state politics, including committees for Federal Relations, Education and School Lands, Public Buildings and State Institutions, Water Rights/Agriculture, Public Lands, Taxation and Public Debt, Public Officers Salaries and the Militia, and Mines/Mining.

Also among the committees was the Committee on Elections and Right of Suffrage, notable because of how much statewide attention the question of women’s suffrage had garnered leading up to and during the Utah Constitutional Convention. The Constitution of Utah was accepted by Congress and President Grover Cleveland, leading to Utah's admittance into the union as the 45th state on January 4, 1896.

== Women's suffrage ==
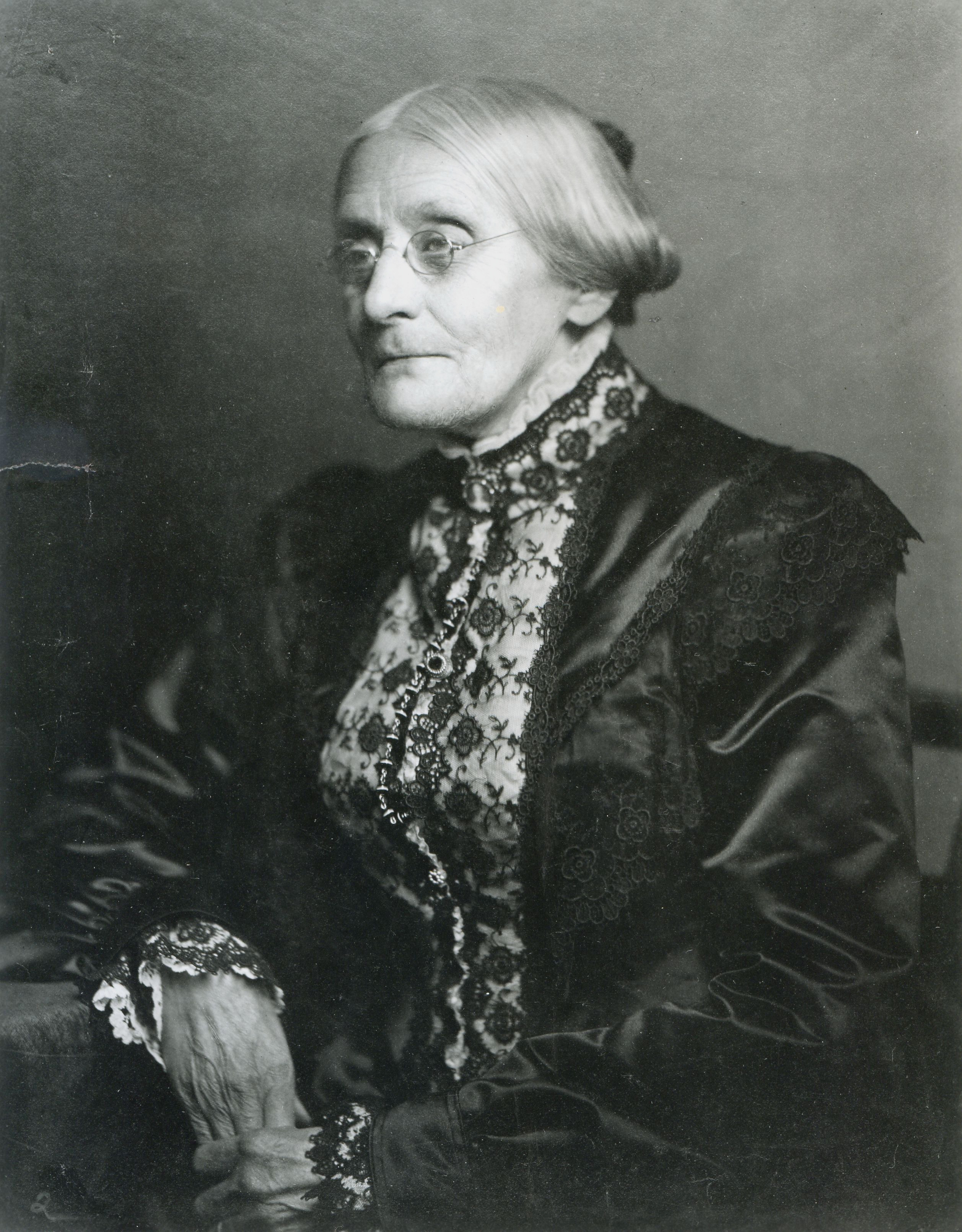
Susan B. Anthony, leader in the women's rights movement

One of the most controversial issues that was addressed during the convention was voting rights for women. This was not because the delegates were opposed to the idea of women’s suffrage; on the contrary, both the republican and the democrat political parties in Utah had initially expressed their support for the moment and promised to include the issue in the convention agenda. Rather, as the date of the convention drew near, some delegates began to worry that attempting to pass the new constitution with political rights for women would be more complicated than, with the sentiment being “wait til we are a state, then we will give to women suffrage.”

Women had previously enjoyed the right to vote in the Utah Territory between 1870 and 1887, but had lost that right following the 1887 Edmunds–Tucker Act, which stripped away voting rights not only from men and women practicing polygamy, but from all women residing in the Utah territory. Upon losing voting rights, women suffragist movements waited and prepared for the opportunity regain them. In a letter to women in Utah in July 1894, women's rights advocate Susan B. Anthony advised, “Now in the formative period of your constitution is the time to establish justice and equality to all the people…. Once ignored in your constitution–you’ll be as powerless to secure recognition as we are in the older states.” Women could not vote for which delegates should attend the constitutional convention, but they still found ways to make their voices heard. They held rallies before the convention and had influential women speak at the convention on why it was important for Utah as a whole for women to be able to vote.

While the majority of the delegates supported women being able to vote, some of them worried that including the suffrage clause in the Utah State Constitution would put the whole constitution at risk of being denied, either by the people of Utah or by Congress. B. H. Roberts was particularly vocal about his concerns within the convention. Outside of the convention there were a number of businesses and individuals opposed to suffrage that held their own meetings. Such movements led people to consider whether it was worth trying to pass the constitution with women's suffrage, or if it was better to get the constitution passed first and then worry about suffrage.

Women suffragists like Ruth May Fox and Lucy Heppler were not willing to see their window of opportunity close. They, and many other women, gathered signatures from twenty Utah counties in support of women's suffrage. The number of signatures in favor of women's voting rights surpassed those opposed to it, and so suffrage was included within the Utah State Constitution, restoring to women in Utah the right to vote.

Utah women played an important role in advancing the women's suffrage movement nationwide. After the constitutional convention, Susan B. Anthony visited Utah along with Anna Howard Shaw and Emmeline B. Wells. Anthony addressed a large congregation of women at the Salt Lake Tabernacle and congratulated them on their successful fight for suffrage. She believed that if women in Utah could achieve voting rights, nationwide women's suffrage was also possible.

== List of delegates ==
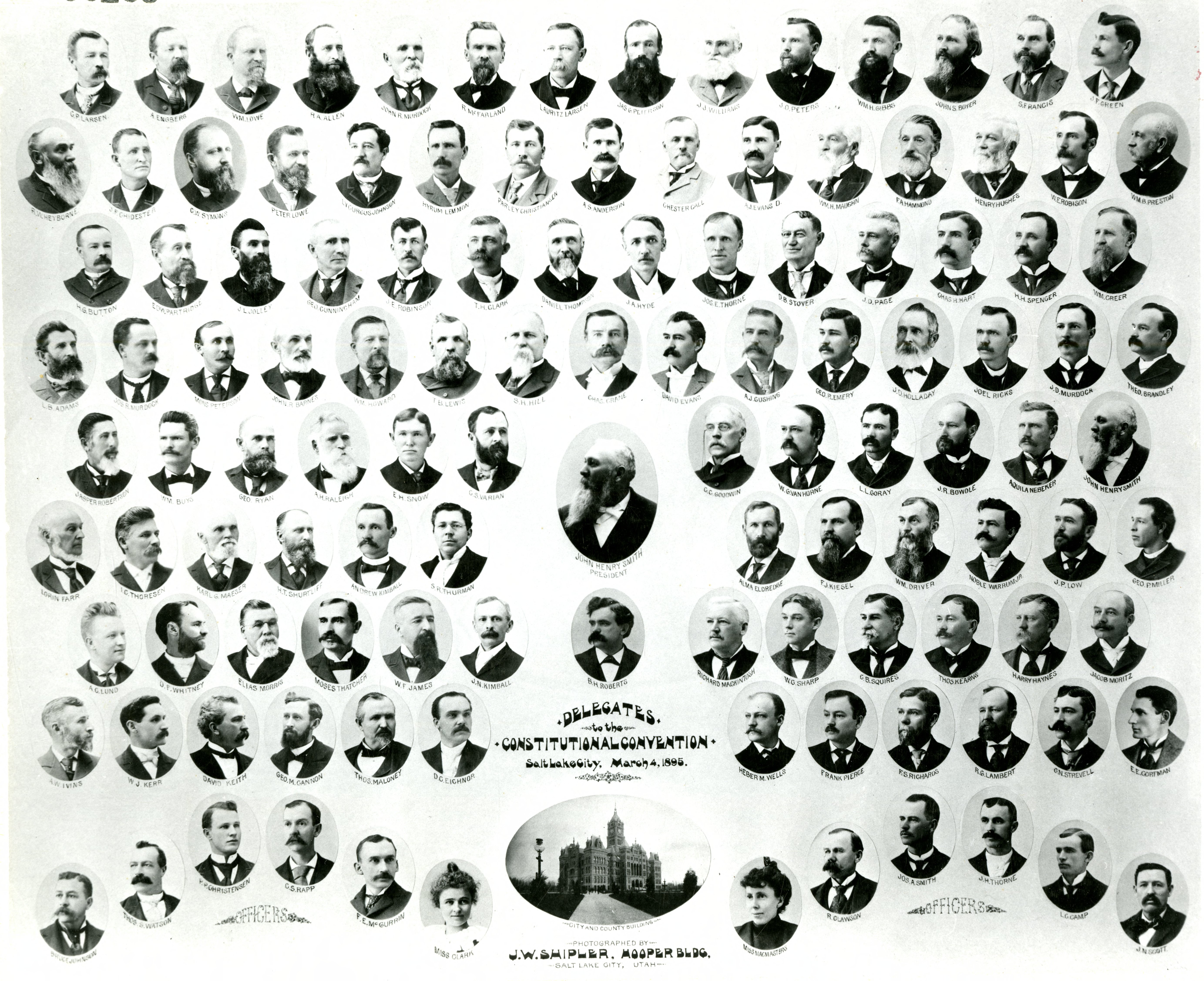
Delegates at the Utah Constitutional Convention of 1895.

The names and counties of the 107 delegates present at the Utah Constitutional Convention of 1895:

- Andrew Smith Anderson (Beaver County)
- John Riggs Murdock (Beaver County)
- William Henry Gibbs (Box Elder County)
- Peter Lowe (Box Elder County)
- William Lowe (Box Elder County)
- John David Peters (Box Elder County)
- Charles H. Hart (Cache County)
- Henry Hughs (Cache County)
- William Jasper Kerr (Cache County)
- James Paton Low (Cache County)
- William H. Maughan (Cache County)
- Moses Thatcher (Cache County)
- Ingwald C. Thoresen (Cache County)
- Noble Warrum Jr. (Cache County)
- John R. Barnes (Davis County)
- Chester Call (Davis County)
- Brigham Henry Roberts (Davis County)
- William Howard (Emery County)
- Jasper Robertson (Emery County)
- William Gibson Sharp (Emery County)
- John Foy Chidester (Garfield County)
- Mons Peterson (Grand County)
- Robert W. Heyborne (Iron County)
- Louis Laville Coray (Juab County)
- Joseph Alonzo Hyde (Juab County)
- George Ryan (Juab County)
- Joseph Eldredge Robinson (Kane County)
- Charles Crane (Millard County)
- Daniel Thompson (Millard County)
- Samuel Francis (Morgan County)
- Rufus Albern Allen (Piute County)
- Aquila Nebeker (Rich County)
- John Rutledge Bowdle (Salt Lake All Other Areas)
- George Mousley Cannon (Salt Lake All Other Areas)
- Arthur John Cushing (Salt Lake All Other Areas)
- James Frederic Green (Salt Lake All Other Areas)
- Harry Haynes (Salt Lake All Other Areas)
- Harrison Tuttle Shurtliff (Salt Lake All Other Areas)
- George B. Squires (Salt Lake All Other Areas)
- Joseph John Williams (Salt Lake All Other Areas)
- Dennis Clay Eichnor (Salt Lake Precinct 1)
- Jacob Moritz (Salt Lake Precinct 1)
- Frank Pierce (Salt Lake Precinct 1)
- Charles William Symons (Salt Lake Precinct 1)
- Herbert Guion Button (Salt Lake Precinct 2)
- Samuel Hood Hill (Salt Lake Precinct 2)
- Richard G. Lambert (Salt Lake Precinct 2)
- Richard Mackintosh (Salt Lake Precinct 2)
- Elias Morris (Salt Lake Precinct 2)
- William Grant Van Horne (Salt Lake Precinct 2)
- George Rhodes Emery (Salt Lake Precinct 3)
- Andrew Kimball (Salt Lake Precinct 3)
- William B. Preston (Salt Lake Precinct 3)
- Alonzo Hazelton Raleigh (Salt Lake Precinct 3)
- John Henry Smith (Salt Lake Precinct 3)
- Franklin S. Richards (Salt Lake Precinct 4)
- Heber M. Wells (Salt Lake Precinct 4)
- Orson F. Whitney (Salt Lake Precinct 4)
- Charles Carroll Goodwin (Salt Lake Precinct 5)
- William F. James (Salt Lake Precinct 5)
- Charles Stetson Varian (Salt Lake Precinct 5)
- Francis Asbury Hammond (San Juan County)
- Parley Christiansen (Sanpete County)
- Joseph Loftus Jolley (Sanpete County)
- Christen Peter Larsen (Sanpete County)
- Lauritz Larsen (Sanpete County)
- Anthony C. Lund (Sanpete County)
- Jeremiah Day Page (Sanpete County)
- James Christian Peterson (Sanpete County)
- Theodore Brandley (Sevier County)
- George Parcust Miller (Sevier County)
- Joel Ricks (Sevier County)
- Alma Eldredge (Summit County)
- Thomas Kearns (Summit County)
- David Keith (Summit County)
- James David Murdock (Summit County)
- Thomas H. Clark Jr. (Tooele County)
- David Brainerd Stover (Tooele County)
- Lycurgus Johnson (Uintah County)
- John Sell Boyer (Utah County)
- Elmer Ellsworth Corfman (Utah County)
- William Creer (Utah County)
- George Cunningham (Utah County)
- Andreas Engberg (Utah County)
- Abel John Evans (Utah County)
- John Daniel Holladay (Utah County)
- Hyrum Lemmon (Utah County)
- Karl G. Maeser (Utah County)
- Edward Partridge (Utah County)
- Joseph Ephraim Thorne (Utah County)
- Samuel R. Thurman (Utah County)
- William Buys (Wasatch County)
- Joseph R. Murdock (Wasatch County)
- Anthony W. Ivins (Washington County)
- Edward H. Snow (Washington County)
- Willis E. Robison (Wayne County)
- Louis Bernhardt Adams (Weber County)
- William Driver (Weber County)
- David Evans (Weber County)
- Lorin Farr (Weber County)
- Frederick John Kiesel (Weber County)
- James Nathaniel Kimball (Weber County)
- Theodore B. Lewis (Weber County)
- Thomas Maloney (Weber County)
- Robert McFarland (Weber County)
- Hiram Hupp Spencer (Weber County)
- Charles Nettleton Strevell (Weber County)

== See also ==
- Constitution of Utah
