= 1st Utah State Legislature =

The 1st Utah State Legislature was elected on Tuesday, November 5, 1895, and convened on Monday, January 13, 1896.

== Dates of sessions ==
- 1896 Biennial Session: January 13, 1896

== Utah Senate ==
=== Make-up ===
Affiliation	Members
Republican Party	11
Democratic Party	7
Total	18
Government Majority	4

=== Members ===
Name	Religion	Party	Residence	County	District	Birthplace	Age at Election
Allison, Edward M.	Gentile	Republican	Ogden	Weber	4	Utah	31
Barnes, John R.	Mormon	Democrat	Kaysville	Davis	3	England	62
Booth, Hiram E.	Gentile	Republican	Salt Lake City	Salt Lake	6	Iowa	35
Candland, William	Mormon	Republican	Mt. Pleasant	Sanpete	9	Utah	31
Cannon, George M.	Mormon	Republican	Salt Lake City	Salt Lake	6	Utah	33
Chambers, Robert C.	Gentile	Democrat	Park City	Summit	5	Ohio	63
Chidester, John F.	Mormon	Republican	Panguitch	Garfield	10	Utah	41
Driscoll, James P.	Gentile	Republican	Eureka	Juab	8	Michigan	34
Evans, Abel J.	Mormon	Democrat	Lehi	Utah	7	Utah	42
Jones, Elmer B.	Gentile	Republican	Salt Lake City	Salt Lake	6	Iowa	34
McKay, David	Mormon	Republican	Huntsville	Weber	4	Scotland	51
Miller, Glen	Gentile	Republican	Salt Lake City	Salt Lake	6	Ohio	32
Miller, Reuben G.	Mormon	Republican	Price	Carbon	12	Utah	34
Snow, Edward H.	Mormon	Democrat	St. George	Washington	11	Utah	30
Sutherland, George	Gentile	Republican	Salt Lake City	Salt Lake	6	England	33
Warner, Malin M.	Gentile	Democrat	Provo City	Utah	7	Iowa	39
Warrum, Noble	Gentile	Democrat	Logan	Cache	2	Indiana	31
Zundel, Abraham	Mormon	Republican	Willard City	Box Elder	1	Pennsylvania	59

== Utah House of Representatives ==
=== Make-up ===
Affiliation	Members
Republican Party	31
Democratic Party	14
Total	45
Government Majority	17

=== Members ===
Name	Religion	Party	Residence	County	District	Birthplace	Age at Election
Andrus, James	Mormon	Democrat	St. George	Washington	25	Ohio	60
Beard, George	Mormon	Republican	Coalville	Summit	9	England	40
Bernhisel Jr., John M.	Mormon	Democrat	Lewiston	Cache	2	Nebraska	58
Bolitho, James M.	Gentile	Republican	Richfield	Sevier	18	Illinois	36
Cazier, Adelbert	Mormon	Republican	Nephi	Juab	13	Utah	35
Clark, Edgar L.	Mormon	Republican	Parowan	Iron	24	Nebraska	47
Condon, Amasa S.	Gentile	Republican	Ogden	Weber	4	Maine	53
Critchlow, Edward B.	Gentile	Republican	Salt Lake City	Salt Lake	8	Mississippi	37
Curtis, Lee A.	Gentile	Republican	Ogden	Weber	4	Ohio	43
Cushing, Harwood M.	Gentile	Republican	Salt Lake City	Salt Lake	8	Canada	31
Denny, Presley	Gentile	Republican	Beaver City	Beaver	20	Ohio	50
Egan, R. E.	Mormon	Democrat	Woodscross	Davis	6	Massachusetts	53
Ferguson, James X.	Mormon	Republican	Helper	Carbon	15	Utah	42
Fergusson, Thomas	Gentile	Republican	Salt Lake City	Salt Lake	8	Scotland	42
Gibbs, William H.	Mormon	Republican	Portage	Box Elder	1	Wales	44
Gibson, William	Mormon	Democrat	Vernal	Uintah	12	Scotland	50
Harris, Nathan J.	Mormon	Republican	Harrisville	Weber	4	Utah	31
Heiner, Daniel	Mormon	Republican	Morgan City	Morgan	5	Pennsylvania	45
Howard, William	Mormon	Democrat	Huntington	Emery	16	Ireland	48
Larsen, Marinus	Mormon	Democrat	Spanish Fork	Utah	11	Denmark	45
Lemmon, Hyrum	Mormon	Democrat	Payson	Utah	11	Illinois	45
Lewis, Thomas D.	Mormon	Republican	Salt Lake City	Salt Lake	8	Utah	30
Lowry, John	Mormon	Republican	Manti	Sanpete	14	Missouri	66
Mansfield, M. W.	Mormon	Democrat	Thurber	Wayne	22	Utah	33
Maughan, Peter M.	Mormon	Democrat	Wellsville	Cache	2	Utah	37
Monson, Joseph	Mormon	Democrat	Richmond	Cache	2	Utah	33
Morrill, Charles	Gentile	Republican	Junction	Piute	21	Utah	41
Morrison, Seth W.	Gentile	Republican	Salt Lake City	Salt Lake	8	Wisconsin	55
Murdock, Joseph R.	Mormon	Democrat	Charleston	Wasatch	10	Utah	35
Nebeker, Aquila	Gentile	Democrat	Laketown	Rich	3	Utah	36
Nebeker, William P.	Mormon	Republican	Salt Lake City	Salt Lake	8	Ohio	59
Nye, George L.	Gentile	Republican	Salt Lake City	Salt Lake	8	Iowa	26
Raddatz, Emil J.	Gentile	Republican	Stockton	Tooele	7	Prussia	38
Robinson, Joseph E.	Mormon	Republican	Kanab	Kane	26	Utah	27
Sevy, Thomas	Mormon	Republican	Panguitch	Garfield	23	Utah	28
Shafer, John H.	Gentile	Republican	Moab	Grand	17	Utah	44
Smoot II, Abraham O.	Mormon	Democrat	Provo City	Utah	11	Utah	39
Snedaker, J. F.	Mormon	Republican	Mill Creek	Salt Lake	8	Utah	33
Sorensen, Andrew P.	Mormon	Democrat	Moab	Grand	27	Denmark	34
Stevens, Thomas J.	Mormon	Republican	Ogden	Weber	4	England	47
Taylor, Alvin V.	Gentile	Republican	Salt Lake City	Salt Lake	8	Utah	30
Thompson, Orvil L.	Mormon	Republican	Scipio	Millard	19	Utah	30
Thompson, Peter	Mormon	Republican	Ephraim	Sanpete	14	Utah	35
Thorne, James T.	Mormon	Republican	Pleasant Grove	Utah	11	Utah	40
Wilson, William W.	Mormon	Republican	Sandy	Salt Lake	8	England	39

== See also ==
- List of Utah state legislatures
