= Polygamy in Utah =

Polygamy in Utah is covered by these articles:

- Polygamy in North America
- Mormonism and polygamy
- Current state of polygamy in the Latter Day Saint movement
