= Rockland Ranch =

Polygamous community in Moab, Utah

Rockland Ranch (also known as "The Rock") is a fundamentalist Mormon, polygamous community in Moab, Utah. The community was founded in 1977 by Robert Dean Foster (d. 2008) as a place for fundamentalist Mormons to live and practice plural marriage out of the public eye. There were fifteen families involved in the community's formation. The ranch's name is derived from the rockface in which the community's homes are built with the aid of dynamite. This building technique was utilized in order to protect the residents from Utah's extreme weather.

As of 2019, of the 35-ish families in the community, around half contain plural marriages. Rockland Ranch hosts annual events that draw fundamentalist Mormons from around the country.

== In media ==
Rockland Ranch is the setting for the Netflix reality TV series Three Wives, One Husband, which follows the lives of the Foster and Morrison families for a year.
