= Senator Booth =

Senator Booth may refer to:

== Members of the United States Senate ==
- Hiram Booth (1860–1940), U.S. Senator from Utah from 1906 to 1914
- Newton Booth (1825–1892), U.S Senator from California from 1875 to 1881

== United States state senate members ==
- Arden Booth (1911–2000), Kansas State Senate
- James W. Booth (1822–1876), New York State Senate
- Joseph Booth (politician) (fl. 2010s), Delaware State Senate

== See also ==
- Armistead L. Boothe (1907–1990), Virginia State Senate
