= Daniel Heiner =

Daniel Heiner may refer to:

- Daniel B. Heiner (1854–1944), member of the US House of Representatives
- Daniel Heiner (Utah politician) (1850–1931), member of the Utah House of Representatives
