= Thomas Stevens =

Thomas, Tom Stevens or Thomas, Tom Stephens may refer to:

== Arts and entertainment ==
- Thomas Stevens (weaver) (1828–1888), English silk weaver
- Thomas E. Stephens (artist) (1884–1966), Welsh-born portrait painter
- Terry-Thomas or Thomas Stevens (1911–1990), English comedian and character actor
- Thomas Stevens (trumpeter) (1938–2018), American trumpeter, composer, and author
- Tom Stevens (musician) (born 1956), American bassist, guitarist, singer, and songwriter
- Tom Stevens (actor) (born 1987), Canadian actor, producer, and musician
- Rogers Stevens (born Thomas Rogers Stevens, 1970), American guitarist
- T. M. Stevens (Thomas Michael Stevens), American bass guitarist
- Thomas Wood Stevens, American artist, poet, writer, and theatre director

== Military ==
- Thomas Holdup Stevens (1795–1841), American naval commander in the War of 1812
- Thomas Stephens (Wisconsin pioneer) (1815–1871), Union Army cavalry officer
- Thomas H. Stevens Jr. (1819–1896), admiral of the United States Navy who fought in the American Civil War

== Law and politics ==
- Thomas Stevens (MP for Gloucester), MP for Gloucester, 1420–1442
- Thomas G. Stephens (1818–?), Wisconsin legislator
- Thomas Blacket Stephens (1819–1877), mayor of Brisbane
- Thomas J. Stevens (1848–1900), member of the Utah State legislature
- Thomas E. Stephens (politician) (1904–1988), American politician
- Tom Stephens (born 1951), Australian politician, member of the Parliament of Western Australia 1982 to 2013
- Tom Stevens (Objectivist Party politician) (1956–2019), American politician, 2008 and 2012 presidential nominee of the Objectivist Party
- Tom Stevens (Vermont politician), member of the Vermont House of Representatives

== Religion ==
- Thomas Stevens (monk) (c. 1490–1550), abbot of Netley Abbey and Beaulieu Abbey, English renaissance clergyman and Cistercian monk
- Thomas Stephens (Jesuit) (c. 1549–1619), early writer in Konkani
- Thomas Stevens (bishop) (1841–1920), inaugural bishop of Barking

== Sports ==
- Thomas Stevens (cyclist) (1854–1935), first man to cycle around the world
- Thomas Stevens (motorcyclist), AMA Superbike Champion 1991
- Thomas Stephens (American football) (1935–2018), professional American football player
- Thomas Stephens (boxer) (born 1969), Liberian Olympic boxer

== Others ==
- Thomas Stephens Davies (c. 1794–1851), British mathematician
- Thomas Stevens (c. 1800–?), the founder of Bradfield College
- Thomas Stephens (historian) (1821–1875), Welsh historian
- Thomas Stephens (educationist) (1830–1913), school inspector and university vice-chancellor in colonial Australia
- Thomas Stevens Stevens (1900–2000), Scottish organic chemist
- Thomas Dean Stevens (1957–1993), who was executed for the 1977 murder of Roger Honeycutt
