= Raddatz =

Raddatz is a German surname. Notable people with the surname include:

- Fritz J. Raddatz (1931–2015), German feuilletonist, essayist, biograph and romancier
- Martha Raddatz (born 1953), an American newscaster
- Emil John Raddatz (1857–1933), an American mining magnate
