= Senator Murdock (disambiguation) =

Abe Murdock (1893–1979) was a U.S. Senator from Utah from 1941 to 1947.

Senator Murdock may also refer to:

- Casey Murdock (fl. 2010s–2020s), Oklahoma State Senate
- Joseph R. Murdock (1858–1931), Utah State Senate
- Natalie Murdock (born 1984), North Carolina State Senate
- Reginald Murdock (born 1966), Arkansas State Senate
