= Senator Evans =

Senator Evans may refer to:

== Members of the United States Senate ==
- Daniel J. Evans (1925–2024), U.S. Senator from Washington from 1983 to 1989
- George Evans (American politician) (1797–1867), U.S. Senator from Maine from 1841 to 1847
- Josiah J. Evans (1786–1858), U.S. Senator from South Carolina from 1853 to 1858

== United States state senate members ==
- Abel John Evans (1852–1939), Utah State Senate
- Alonzo H. Evans (1820–1907), Massachusetts State Senate
- Cheryl A. Gray Evans (born 1968), Louisiana State Senate
- Clement A. Evans (1833–1911), Georgia State Senate
- David Ellicott Evans (1788–1850), New York State Senate
- David H. Evans (1837–1920), New York State Senate
- George S. Evans (1826–1883), California State Senate
- Henry H. Evans (1836–1917), Illinois State Senate
- James Evans (Utah politician) (fl. 2010s), Utah State Senate
- John Evans (Idaho governor) (1925–2014), Idaho State Senate
- Joseph P. Evans (1835–1889), Virginia State Senate
- Kenneth A. Evans (1898–1970), Iowa State Senate
- Marcellus H. Evans (1884–1953), New York State Senate
- Noreen Evans (born 1955), California State Senate
- Walter Evans (American politician) (1842–1923), Kentucky State Senate

== See also ==
- James Edgar Evins (1883–1954), Tennessee State Senate
