= Edward H. Snow =

Utah educator and politician

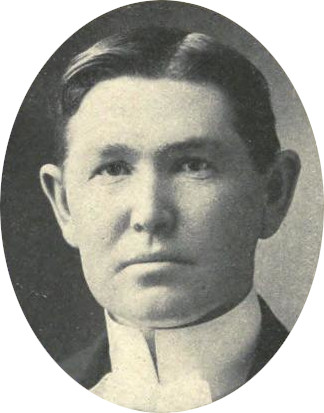

Member of the Utah Senate from the 11th district
- In office January 13, 1896 – January 8, 1899
- Succeeded by: Rollin R. Tanner

Personal details
- Born: June 23, 1865 St. George, Utah
- Died: July 18, 1932 (aged 67)
- Party: Democrat
- Spouse: Hannah Nelson

Edward Hunter Snow (June 23, 1865 - July 18, 1932) was a Utah educator, politician, and leader in the Church of Jesus Christ of Latter-day Saints.

Snow was born in St. George, Utah, to Erastus Snow and Julia Josephine Spencer. His father previously represented St. George in the Utah territorial legislature.

Snow was a delegate to the Utah Constitutional Convention of 1895. He was then elected to the State Senate and served in the 1st Utah State Legislature once statehood took effect in January 1896. Snow was re-elected to another term in 1897. He also served as a county superintendent of schools and as St. George city recorder.

As president of the St. George Stake of the church, he led the founding of the St. George Stake Academy in 1911, which later became Dixie College and is today Utah Tech University.
