= Samuel Francis (politician) =

American politician (1830–1906)

Samuel Francis (1830–1906) was a politician and religious leader in 19th-century Utah Territory.

== Biography ==
Francis was born at Trowbridge, Wiltshire, England. He joined the Church of Jesus Christ of Latter Day Saints in 1847 over his family's objections. In 1850 he took charge of missionary labor in Sherborne, Dorset and was ordained an Elder, then spent a few years as a missionary in England. In 1854 he was appointed to serve in the Swiss Mission, which soon put him in charge of all Latter-day Saint operations in Italy. There he met and baptized Esther Charlotte Emily Weissbrodt, a school teacher. In February 1856, he was reassigned to Geneva, Switzerland to oversee the emigration of Latter-day Saints from Switzerland to the United States. He and Esther married in Geneva in 1857 and had 10 children, all of whom lived to adulthood. In 1858 he returned to England to work directly under William Budge.

Francis was honorably released from his missionary labors in 1861. He and his family emigrated to the United States, arriving in Salt Lake City in the Utah Territory that fall. In 1863 they moved to Morgan County, where he worked mainly as a farmer and rancher. When the Morgan Stake was organized in 1877, Francis became a counselor to the president of the stake, retaining the position until he was honorably released in 1900 and ordained a Patriarch.

Francis served at various times as county clerk, county recorder, county attorney, justice of the peace, and probate judge. In 1886, he was elected to the Territorial Council (the legislature of the Utah Territory). For a single two-year term, he represented a northeastern district covering Morgan, Summit, Wasatch and Uintah Counties. He was then admitted to the bar in 1888 and practiced law for the rest of his life. He was a member of the State Constitutional Convention when Utah became a state.

== Sources ==
- Utah State Archives listing of members of the Utah Territorial Legislature
