= Willis E. Robison =

American politician

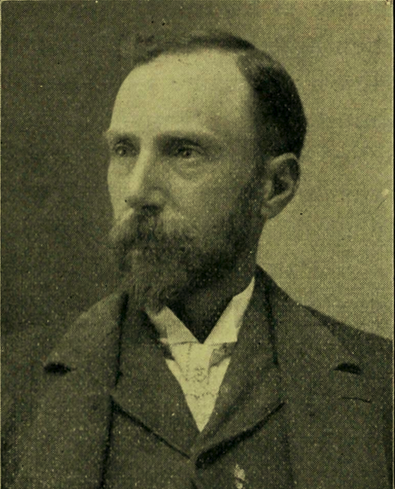
- Born: March 1, 1854; Crete, Illinois
- Died: June 28, 1937 (aged 83); Hinckley, Utah
- Known for: Utah politician and ecclesiastical leader

Willis Eugene Robison (March 1, 1854 – June 28, 1937) was a member of the Utah Territorial Legislature.

Robison was born in Crete, Will County, Illinois and raised in Fillmore, Utah from a very young age. He married Sarah A. Ellett. From 1882 to 1884 he served as a missionary for the Church of Jesus Christ of Latter-day Saints (LDS Church) in the Southern States Mission. In 1888 he moved to Piute, Utah and the following year to Loa, Utah when he was called to serve as bishop of the LDS Church ward in that place.

In the 1890s, Robison was elected to the Utah Territorial Legislature from the district that covered what was then Piute and Beaver counties. When Piute County was split, Robison was put in charge of organizing the new county, which he named Wayne County supposedly after one of his sons or after Wayne County, Tennessee. In 1893, when the Wayne Stake of the LDS Church was organized, Robison was made the first president of that stake.

Robison was a member of the 1895 Utah Constitutional Convention.
