= Current state of polygamy in the Latter Day Saint movement =

Joseph Smith, the founder of the Latter Day Saint movement, privately taught and practiced polygamy. After Smith's death in 1844, the church he established splintered into several competing groups. Disagreement over Smith's doctrine of "plural marriage" has been among the primary reasons for multiple church schisms.

The members of the largest faction, The Church of Jesus Christ of Latter-day Saints (LDS Church), do not continue to teach and practice polygamy today. In the late-19th century and early-20th century, the practice was formally abandoned as various laws banned polygamy in the United States and led to the confiscation of LDS Church properties. However, many LDS men are sealed in LDS temples to more than one woman "for eternity", following the divorce or death of the first wife, the latter example being the case with the current LDS president, Dallin H. Oaks.

The second-largest Latter Day Saint church, the Community of Christ (formerly the Reorganized Church of Jesus Christ of Latter Day Saints or RLDS Church), has a history of opposing the LDS Church's practice of polygamy. Other smaller Latter Day Saint churches were also formed as a means of opposing the LDS Church's polygamy. The formal shift in doctrine by the LDS Church later in the early-20th century gave rise to the Mormon fundamentalism movement, which has since fragmented into a number of separate churches, the most well-known being the Fundamentalist Church of Jesus Christ of Latter-Day Saints (FLDS Church). The FLDS Church and other Mormon fundamentalists believe the practice of polygamy should continue and that it was wrongfully abandoned by the LDS Church.

== The Church of Jesus Christ of Latter-day Saints ==
Polygamy is condemned by The Church of Jesus Christ of Latter-day Saints (LDS Church). Latter-day Saints believe that monogamy—the marriage of one man and one woman—is the Lord’s standing law of marriage. However, the LDS Church considers polygamy to have been a divinely inspired commandment that is supported by scripture; today, the LDS Church teaches the historical aspects in an adult Sunday School lesson once every four years. The LDS official position is God rescinded the commandment to practice plural marriage. Church apostle Joseph F. Smith explained, "The doctrine is not repealed, the truth is not annulled, the law is right and just now as ever, but the observance of it is stopped".

The LDS Church has not officially tolerated plural marriages since the 1890 Manifesto. However, all of the First Presidency and almost all of the apostles of the time continued to maintain multiple families into the 20th century, feeling they could not dissolve existing unions and families. Research beginning in the 1980s estimated the average incidence of polygamy during the 40 years in which it was a practice of the LDS Church was 15% to 30%, depending on the years and location, including virtually all church leadership at the time. Polygamy was gradually discontinued after the 1904 Second Manifesto as no new plural marriages were allowed and older polygamists eventually died, with polygamous LDS families cohabitating into the 1940s and 1950s. Since the Second Manifesto, the policy of the LDS Church has been to excommunicate members who practice, officiate, or openly encourage the practice of plural marriages. However, LDS leaders such as Joseph Fielding Smith have acknowledged the belief in polygamy in the afterlife, in the case of a widower becoming sealed in eternal marriage to a second wife after the death of the first wife. In such a case, a man can be married to two or more women in the celestial kingdom.

=== Relationship of current practices to plural marriage ===
As of 1998, by proxy, "A deceased woman may be sealed to all men to whom she was legally married during her life. However, if she was sealed to a husband during her life, all her husbands must be deceased before she can be sealed to a husband to whom she was not sealed during life." Theological issues persist as the LDS Church states marriage relationships continue into the afterlife, yet people may only have one living spouse.

== History of polygamy ==
The LDS Church began to practice polygamy in secret under the leadership of prophet Joseph Smith. When Utah became a territory in 1851, Brigham Young was appointed by the US Congress to be its first governor. After this milestone towards statehood, Mormons began to gradually become more open about their involvement in polygamy. This sparked numerous anti-polygamy debates in Congress in the following years. Congressional Republicans soon began to compare polygamy to slavery and adopted the name "the twin relics of barbarism" at the 1856 Republican convention. In 1858 president James Buchanan sent federal troops to Salt Lake City and Brigham Young gave up his position as governor without a fight.

=== Morrill Anti-Bigamy Act of 1860 ===
In 1860, Republican representative Justin S. Morrill presented his anti-bigamy bill to US Congress for the third time. The bill instituted punitive sentencing on those convicted of polygamy and enacted financial restrictions on the LDS church. After passing in both the House and Senate the bill was signed by President Abraham Lincoln on July 1, 1862. However, the bill was rarely and weakly enforced and in a matter of years, mostly forgotten.

=== Reynolds v. United States ===
George Reynolds was a Utah resident and member of the LDS Church. He was convicted on polygamy charges for having two wives and his defense claimed that his First Amendment right to freedom of religion had been violated. When the case came before the United States Supreme Court, Reynolds's conviction was upheld. It was decided that Congress maintained the ability to prohibit polygamy and the court concluded that a person is not excused from the law on religious grounds.

=== Edmunds Anti-polygamy Act of 1882 ===
The Edmunds Anti-polygamy Act took further action against polygamy and members of the LDS Church. It made polygamy a felony and deemed bigamous cohabitation a misdemeanor. As a result of the bill, at least 1,300 Mormons were found guilty and imprisoned. Those who were found in violation were barred from jury duty, voting and possessing positions of public office. The Edmunds Act sent a clear message to the LDS Church that Congress was determined to put an end to the practice of polygamy.

=== House Bill 307 ===
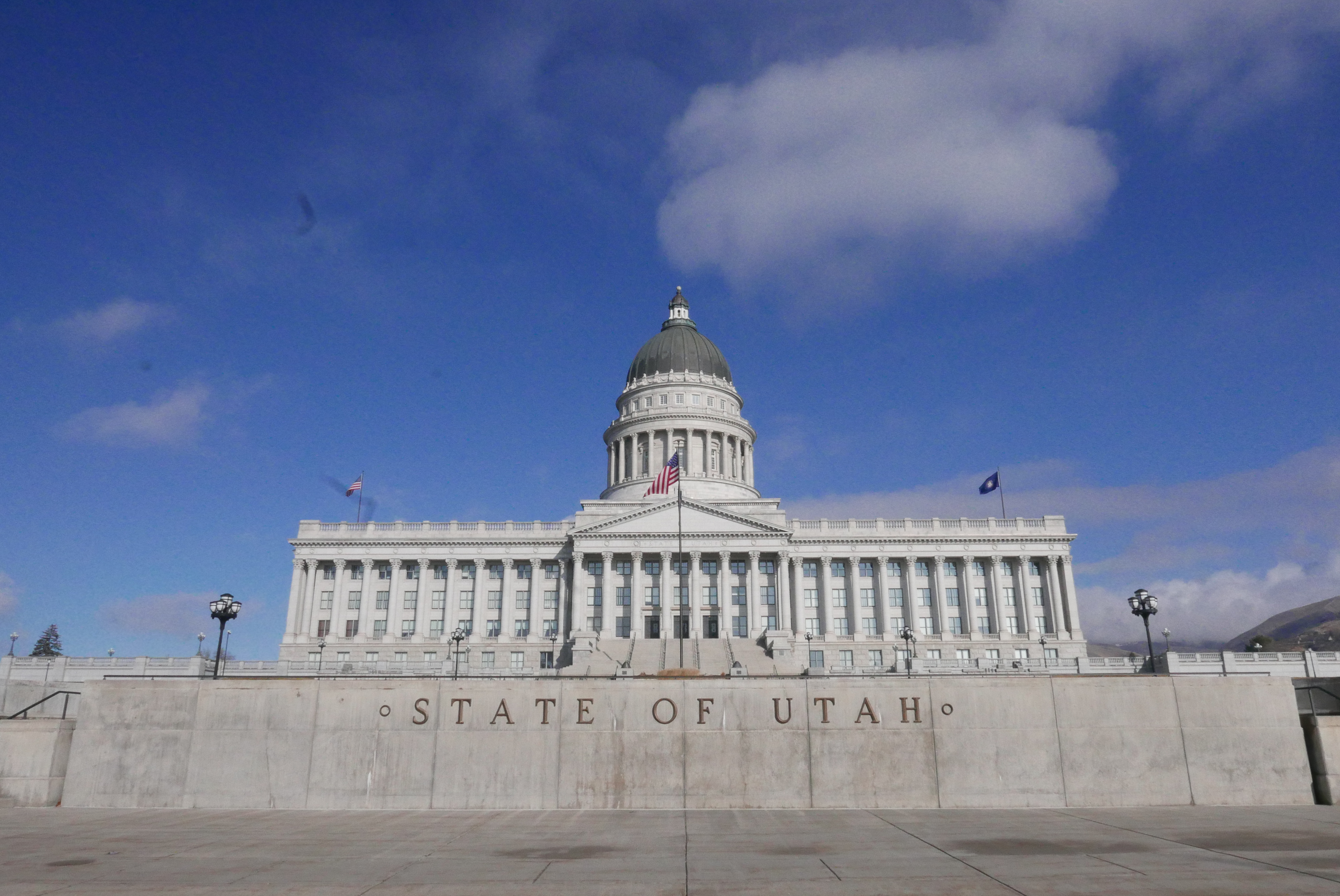
Utah State Capitol Building

In 2003, US House Bill 307 introduced a new child bigamy amendment. This new law proposed a specific definition of what child bigamy is and how it is viewed under the law. It stated that if a person above the age of 18 years were to marry or cohabitate with a person under the age of 18, they would be guilty of a second degree felony. This bill changed the criminal code by adding the second degree felony charge to the listed offenses. The 2008 House Bill 31 aimed to redefine child welfare laws and certain kinds of abuse. This bill included child bigamy under the term "sexual abuse". It placed child bigamy on the same level as incest, sexual battery, and lewdness involving a child. Child bigamy remains a form of sexual abuse today. Utah State Code indicates that any male or female under the age of 18 must receive signed consent of legal guardians, and a judge, after determining the legitimacy of the impending marriage, giving permission for that marriage to take place. In many polygamist communities men marry young girls in their teenage years and are often results of arranged marriages.

=== House Bill 99 ===
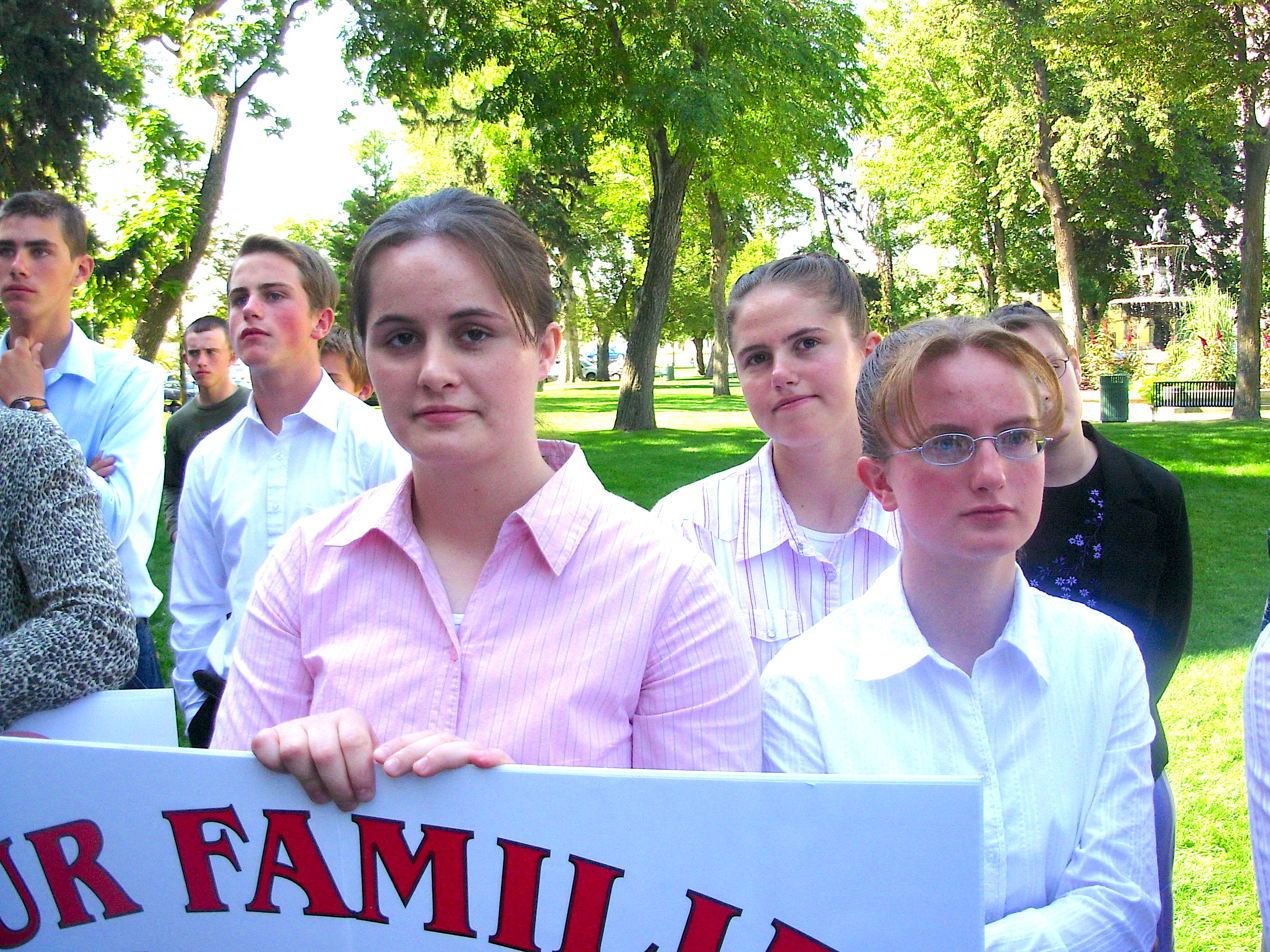
Teenagers of polygamous families

On May 5, 2017, House Bill 99 (HB99) became effective in Utah. The bill was a response to the Brown v Buhman case, filed by reality TV star Kody Brown from the TLC show Sister Wives. HB99 slightly changes the definition of bigamy and child-bigamy. HB99 deems the cohabitation of a man with multiple women whom he refers to as wives illegal, even in relationships between consenting adults. The bill also establishes a stronger emphasis on unlawful behavior within polygamist groups. Many polygamist communities across the state of Utah have been suspected of or exposed for committing a number of crimes such as domestic violence and child abuse. The bill aimed to implement harsher punishment towards polygamists who are also engaged in additional criminal activities such as domestic violence and child abuse. Bigamy is traditionally a third-degree felony, however, HB99 makes a modification, it states that when bigamy is accompanied by other charges such as domestic violence, fraud, child abuse, or sex trafficking it is classified as a second degree felony.

HB99 was sponsored by Utah state senator Kevin T. Van Tassell (whose daughter is engaged in a plural marriage) and Utah state representative Michael E. Noel. After its passing in the legislature, the bill was signed by Utah Governor Gary Herbert on March 28, 2017. A short time before, polygamists and others who opposed the bill rallied at the Utah state capitol to protest the legislation on February 10, 2017. Many polygamists and polygamist supporters argued that the bills punitive approach was unconstitutional by targeting a specific religious minority. The bill further criminalizes their polygamist lifestyle and puts them at an even greater risk of being in trouble with the law.

=== Enforcement of anti-polygamy laws ===
In spite of the laws prohibiting polygamy, many members of the FLDS church and other religions continue to practice polygamy without restraint. While the government does not excuse polygamy because of the nature of the offense it is difficult to prosecute. Lack of prosecution of these polygamist is due to lack of evidence, lack of priority within law enforcement, lack of resources, and a potential influx of orphaned children. Many polygamists are able to legally practice their lifestyle by being legally married to one woman and performing spiritual marriage ceremonies with their other wives. This makes prosecuting very difficult.

== Community of Christ ==
The Community of Christ (formerly the RLDS Church) has rejected the practice of polygamy since its inception and continues to affirm monogamy "as the basic principle of Christian marriage". Many Community of Christ adherents believed Joseph Smith never taught or practiced polygamy and that the doctrine began with the teachings of Brigham Young in the LDS Church. The Community of Christ does not recognize Smith's 1831 revelation or the 1843 revelation on polygamy as canonical, and some members regard them as inauthentic.

Although some past leaders of the RLDS Church—most notably Joseph Smith III and others who were descendants of Joseph Smith—have strenuously denied that Smith taught or practiced polygamy, the Community of Christ today states that it "does not legislate or mandate positions on issues of history". The church acknowledges that research into the early Latter Day Saint movement "seem[s] to increasingly point to Joseph Smith Jr. as a significant source for plural marriage teaching and practice", but the church argues that it must be recognized that Smith was not infallible in his teachings.

== Strangite Church ==
Members of the Church of Jesus Christ of Latter Day Saints (Strangite) have historically taught and, in limited numbers, have practiced plural marriage. James Strang was married to several women during his leadership of the church. However, the Strangites reject the 1843 revelation on polygamy by Joseph Smith. The Book of the Law of the Lord, a part of the Strangite canon, sanctions polygamy, but the church reports that "there are no known cases of polygamy currently in the church".

== Mormon fundamentalist sects ==
Over time, many who rejected the LDS Church's discontinuation of plural marriage formed small, close-knit communities in areas of the Rocky Mountains. These groups continue to practice what they refer to as "the principle", despite its illegality, and consider polygamy a requirement for entry into the highest heaven. Commonly called Mormon fundamentalists, they may practice as individuals, as families, or within organized denominations.

=== Fundamentalist Church of Jesus Christ of Latter-Day Saints ===
Members of the FLDS Church generally believe at least three wives are necessary for entrance to the highest heaven. Similarly, wives are required to be subordinate to their husbands.

The FLDS Church currently practices the law of placing, whereby a young woman of sufficient age is assigned a husband by revelation through the leader of the FLDS Church, who is regarded as a prophet. The prophet may give wives to (and remove wives from) a man according to his worthiness.

=== Apostolic United Brethren ===
The AUB currently supports plural marriage, justified on the "1886 Meeting". While not all members practice plural marriage, it is considered a crucial step to achieve the highest glory of heaven. The leaders of the AUB do not arrange marriages, nor do they authorize marriage for people under 18, nor for those who are closely related.

== Prominent figures and legal cases ==
=== Tom Green ===
Polygamist Tom Green was initially a member of the mainstream LDS church but was excommunicated when he adopted the practice of plural marriage. He resided in a makeshift trailer park in southern Utah with his large family who lived off the welfare system and a small income provided by selling magazine subscriptions. Those of Tom Green's wives who were not legally married to him would often file for welfare as single mothers to receive money. The Green Family came into the spotlight in 1999 when he told Dateline NBC that he had multiple wives during the making of a documentary. Green and his large family had begun to broadcast their lifestyle in the years prior. They appeared on talk shows (including the Jerry Springer Show) and in other documentaries explaining their unique familial situation. All of this media exposure sparked interest in Juab County Attorney David O. Leavitt to begin an investigation. In April 2000, Leavitt charged Green with bigamy, criminal non-support, and child rape. The main offense against Green was his marriage to Linda Kunz, who was 13 when the couple was married. After examining birth certificates, prosecutors discovered that Tom and Linda had conceived a child when she was only 13 years old. In June 2002 Green was sentenced to five years to life in prison and was released in 2007. He died of COVID-19 related pneumonia in 2021. Green is often credited with bringing the underground practice of polygamy back into the legal spotlight.

=== Warren Jeffs ===
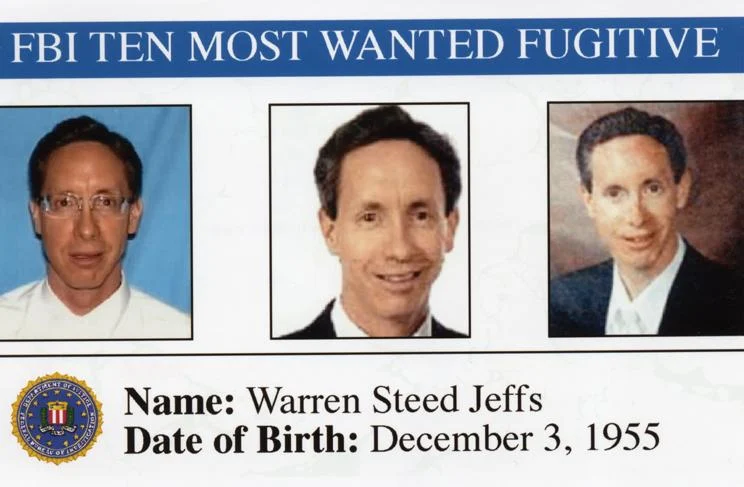
Polygamist and FLDS leader Warren Jeffs

Warren Jeffs is the incarcerated leader of the Fundamentalist Latter-day Saints who was arrested in 2006 by a highway patrolman during a traffic stop in Nevada. Jeffs, the self-proclaimed prophet has a long history of arranging marriages among his followers in a suspicious manner, often creating unions between relatives and under-aged girls. Many of his actions were in direct violation of 2003 House Bill 307 outlining child bigamy laws. He was arrested on multiple counts of being an accomplice to rape and forcing a 14 year old girl to marry her 19 year old cousin. The girl testified in court against Jeffs and in 2007 he was sentenced to two terms of five years to life in prison. He was sentenced again in 2011 on two counts of sexual assault involving his own child brides.

=== Brown v. Buhman ===
Polygamist Kody Brown and his four wives became infamous across the world when their TLC show "Sister Wives" aired in 2010. Because they made their lifestyle so public, they were forced to take residence in Nevada to avoid Utah law enforcement. It was their case, Brown v. Buhman that inspired House Bill 99.

=== Bronson v. Swensen ===
The Supreme Court case Lawrence v. Texas has given polygamists grounds to raise claims of unconstitutional policies regarding polygamy and bigamy. Lawrence v. Texas was not specifically fighting for marriage rights but as a result of the case the unconstitutionality of laws restricting sexual relationships were brought into question. In response to the Lawrence v. Texas case G. Lee Cook, his wife D. Cook, and desired wife J. Bronson, of Salt Lake City, Utah, filed a lawsuit in hopes to abolish restrictive laws against polygamy. Court cases against anti-polygamy laws argue that such laws are unconstitutional in regulating sexual intimacy, or religious freedom. In the case of Bronson v. Swensen the plaintiffs followed suit as they claimed violation of privacy, religious freedom, and restriction of sexual relationships. Following these claims polygamists began to not only rely on the first amendment for grounds of unconstitutionality, but also used the Fourteenth Amendment that gives all citizens equal protection of law.

== Effects of current polygamy practice ==
A societal view on the purpose marriage and its variants determine the regulations and policies made. If marriage is viewed as means of reproduction only, polygamy is accepted. If marriage is viewed as a means of compassion and individual fulfillment and satisfaction, polygamy is rejected.

Under U.S. law any person who wishes to immigrate to the U.S. but practices, or intends to practice, polygamy is denied entrance. Regardless of the legality of the plural marriage in the country of origin, the U.S. government will only recognize one marriage. Thus, a man with multiple wives can only sponsor one wife who wishes to immigrate to the U.S. If a man who practiced polygamy in his maternal country wishes to sponsor more than one wife, he must divorce the wife in the U.S first. Any woman who succeeds in avoiding the bar on polygamy is denied basic legal rights regarding marriage, divorce, and financial support. The denial of these rights "perpetuates the cycle of 'abuse and exploitation' that is sometimes synonymous with modern-day polygamy". Polygamy often puts extra, strenuous responsibilities on women. Many argue that polygamous relationships deny certain rights to women and degrade their value.

== See also ==
- Poland Act
- Edmunds–Tucker Act
- Late Corp. of the Church of Jesus Christ of Latter-Day Saints v. United States
- Reed Smoot hearings
- Polygamy in North America

== Bibliography ==
- Hardy, B. Carmon (2005). "That 'Same Old Question of Polygamy and Polygamous Living:' Some Recent Findings Regarding Nineteenth and Early Twentieth-Century Mormon Polygamy" (PDF). Utah Historical Quarterly. 73 (3). Salt Lake City: 212–224. doi:10.2307/45062934. JSTOR 45062934. S2CID 254439450. Archived from the original (PDF) on 2008-06-26.
- Quinn, D. Michael (1997). "Part 2: Family and Interpersonal Relationships – Plural Marriage and Mormon Fundamentalism". In Marty, Martin E.; Appleby, R. Scott (eds.). Fundamentalisms and Society: Reclaiming the Sciences, the Family, and Education. The Fundamentalism Project. Chicago and London: University of Chicago Press. pp. 240–293. ISBN 9780226508818.
