= Aquila Nebeker =

American politician (1859–1933)

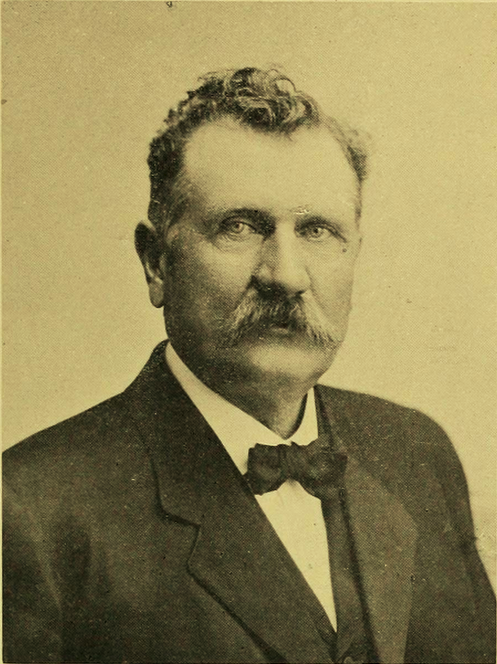

Member of the Utah Senate from the 3rd district
- In office January 11, 1897 – January 13, 1901
- Preceded by: John R. Barnes
- Succeeded by: J.G.M. Barnes

Member of the Utah House of Representatives from the 3rd district
- In office January 13, 1896 – January 10, 1897
- Preceded by: None (1st legislature after statehood)
- Succeeded by: David S. Cook

Personal details
- Born: June 17, 1859 Salt Lake City, Utah
- Died: February 21, 1933 (aged 73) Laketown, Utah

Aquila Nebeker (June 17, 1859 – February 21, 1933) was an American politician, attorney, lawman, and rancher. A Democrat, he was the president of the Utah State Senate during its second term. It was under his direction that the state legislature failed to elect a representative of Utah to the United States Senate. Nebeker served as acting governor of Utah for a short time. Nebeker later served as U.S. Marshal over southeastern Utah and was involved in the a standoff between the U.S. government and Ute people.

Nebeker was born on June 17, 1859, in Salt Lake City, to John and Lurena Fitzgerald Nebeker. He attended schools in Salt Lake City and the University of Deseret—now known as the University of Utah. In 1875, he left school to pursue mining claims at Silver Reef, Utah. When the mines gave out, he relocated to Rich County and took up livestock ranching. He died on February 21, 1933, at his ranch in Laketown, Utah, of complications from pneumonia.
