= Emil John Raddatz =

American businessman and politician

E.J. Raddatz
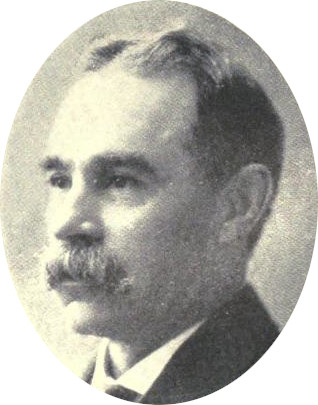
- Born: October 5, 1857; Stettin, Prussia
- Died: November 1, 1933 (aged 76); Salt Lake City, Utah
- Known for: Mayor of Stockton, Utah, member of the first Utah state legislature

Emil John Raddatz (October 5, 1857 in Stettin, Pomerania, Prussia – November 1, 1933 in Salt Lake City, Utah, United States) was a miner, politician, and businessman who shaped Utah's history and its economy. He served as Mayor of Stockton before representing Utah's seventh district in the 1st State Legislature. Raddatz was president, Treasurer and General Manager of the Tintic Standard Mining Company and President and Treasurer of Duluth & Utah Development Company.

Raddatz was one of the five sons of Otto Casemere Raddatz and Wilhelmina C. Lange. He immigrated to the U.S. from Stettin, now in Poland, in 1869 with his family. They lived in Wentzville, Missouri. In about 1870, his mother died and in 1872, so did his father. He worked as a grocery bagger until 1879, when he moved to Silver Cliff, Colorado and then San Juan. He moved from there to Mexico in 1883, and lived there for a year. In 1884, he moved to Ouray's Red Mountain mining district. He lived there until 1887, when he moved to Stockton, Utah. In Stockton, he managed Calumet, Muscatine, and Silver King mines and began working for the Honerine Mining Company. He later served in an advisorial role for Honerine.

== Family ==
Raddatz married Emma Henrietta Guth, daughter of Joseph and Elizabeth Guth, on June 4, 1890. They had five children: Pearl, Flora, Eunice, Harold, and Lucille.
