= Mormonism and polygamy =

Polygamy (called plural marriage by Latter-day Saints in the 19th century or the Principle by modern fundamentalist practitioners of polygamy) was practiced by leaders of the Church of Jesus Christ of Latter-day Saints (LDS Church) for more than half of the 19th century, and practiced publicly from 1852 to 1890 by between 20 and 30 percent of Latter-day Saint families. Polygamy among Latter-day Saints has been controversial, both in Western society and within the LDS Church itself. Many U.S. politicians were strongly opposed to the practice; the Republican platform even referred to polygamy and slavery as "the twin relics of barbarism." Joseph Smith, founder of the Latter-day Saint movement, first introduced polygamy privately in the 1830s. Later, in 1852, Orson Pratt, a member of the Quorum of the Twelve Apostles, publicly announced and defended the practice at the request of then-church president Brigham Young.

Throughout the 19th and early 20th centuries, the LDS Church and the United States remained at odds over the issue. The church defended polygamy as a matter of religious freedom, while the federal government, in line with prevailing public opinion, sought to eradicate it. Polygamy likely played a role in the Utah War of 1857–1858, as Republican critics portrayed Democratic President James Buchanan as weak in opposing both polygamy and slavery. In 1862, the U.S. Congress passed the Morrill Anti-Bigamy Act, prohibiting polygamous marriage in the territories. Despite the law, many Latter-day Saints continued to practice polygamy, believing it was protected by the First Amendment. However, in 1879, the U.S. Supreme Court upheld the Morrill Act's constitutionality in Reynolds v. United States, asserting that while laws could not interfere with religious belief, they could regulate religious practices.

In 1890, when it became clear that Utah would not be admitted to the Union while polygamy was still practiced, church president Wilford Woodruff issued the 1890 Manifesto, officially banning the formation of new polygamous unions within the LDS Church. Although this manifesto did not dissolve existing polygamous marriages, relations with the United States markedly improved after 1890, such that Utah was admitted as a U.S. state in 1896. After the manifesto, some church members continued to enter into polygamous marriages, but these eventually stopped in 1904 when church president Joseph F. Smith disavowed polygamy before Congress and issued a "Second Manifesto", calling for all new polygamous marriages in the church to cease, and established excommunication as the consequence for those who disobeyed. Existing polygamous LDS couples continued to live together into the 1950s.

Several small Mormon fundamentalist groups, seeking to continue the practice, split from the LDS Church, including the Apostolic United Brethren (AUB) and the Fundamentalist Church of Jesus Christ of Latter-Day Saints (FLDS Church). Meanwhile, the LDS Church continues its policy of excommunicating members found practicing polygamy, and today actively seeks to distance itself from fundamentalist groups that continue the practice. (Note: The LDS Church encourages journalists when referring to people or organizations that practice polygamy, to state that the LDS Church is not affiliated with them. The LDS Church repudiates polygamist groups and excommunicates their members if discovered. On its website, the church states that "the standard doctrine of the church is monogamy" and that polygamy was a temporary exception to the rule.) Adherents of various churches and groups from the larger Latter Day Saint movement continue to practice polygamy.

Although the main branch of Mormonism, the Church of Jesus Christ of Latter Day Saints, prohibits any form of bigamy or legal marriage to more than one spouse, it still practices the sealing of multiple women to a single husband in its temple ceremonies. The Church of Jesus Christ of Latter Day Saints also teaches and maintains that both polygyny and polyandry exist in the afterlife, and that a woman can be sealed to more than one husband and that a man can be sealed to multiple women.

== Origin ==
Historian Richard van Wagoner reports that Smith developed an interest in polygamy after studying parts of the Old Testament in which prophets had more than one wife. In the 1830s or early 1840s, (Note: In the words of historian Benjamin Park, "the precise origins of the practice remain murky". According to historian Don Bradley, Joseph Smith's first polygamous marriage was likely in 1833. According to Park, Smith initiated Mormon polygamy in the 1840s.) Latter Day Saint movement founder Joseph Smith secretly initiated a practice of religious polygamy among select members of the Church of Christ he founded. In Nauvoo, Illinois, Smith introduced ecclesiastical leaders to the practice of polygamy, and he married several plural wives. On July 12, 1843, Smith dictated and had recorded what he said was a revelation from God describing the theology and purpose of polygamy, relating it to biblical portrayals of polygamous marriage by Old Testament patriarchs such as Abraham, Isaac, and Jacob. When he dictated the document, Smith said he already "knew the revelation perfectly from beginning to end".

At the time, the practice was kept secret from most people, both adherents and not. The church publicly denounced polygamy, and only some membership knew about the teachings and practiced polygamy. The number of members aware of polygamy grew until the church started openly practicing polygamy in early 1852, eight years after Smith's death. According to some historians and then-contemporary accounts, by this time, polygamy was openly taught and practiced. The doctrine authorizing polygamy was canonized and first published in the 1876 version of the church's Doctrine and Covenants.

=== Types of polygamous marriages ===
There were two types of polygamous marriages in the LDS Church: eternity-only and time-and-eternity. Eternity-only polygamous marriages applied only in the afterlife and time-and-eternity marriages applied both in mortal life and in the afterlife. Smith had sexual relations with some of his wives; others, he had no sexual relations with.

=== Polyandry ===
Other types of polygamous marriages in the early LDS Church were polyandrous (literally "many men") in contrast to polygynous marriages. In polyandrous marriages one woman was married to more than one living husband at the same time. Examples of prominent Mormon women who at some point practiced polyandry included Zina D. H. Young, Patty Bartlett Sessions, Sarah M. Cleveland, and Mary Elizabeth Rollins Lightner. Prominent men who were in polyandrous marriages included presidents Joseph Smith and Brigham Young, as well as the apostles Heber C. Kimball and Orson Hyde. Smith married 14 women who were simultaneously married to their living husband.

== Teachings about polygamy ==
=== Theology ===
==== Salvation ====
Polygamy was taught as being essential for Exaltation. Polygamy was seen as "more important than baptism" and the practice of polygamy was required to participate fully in the "works of Abraham.". Brigham Young stated that:

"if any of you will deny the plurality of wives, and continue to do so, I promise that you will be damned; and I will go still further and say, take this revelation, or any other revelation that the Lord has given, and deny it in your feelings, and I promise that you will be damned. But the Saints who live their religion will be exalted, for they never will deny any revelation which the Lord has given or may give."

Other leaders of the church taught that men who refused to have multiple wives were not obeying God's commandments and that they should step down from their priesthood callings. Church president Joseph F. Smith also spoke about the necessity of practicing polygamy in order to receive Exaltation. Members of the church in St George, Utah report being taught in the late 1800s that there is no "exaltation" without polygamy. In a church-owned newspaper, an article speculates that men and women who refuse to practice polygamy will have a lesser station in the afterlife.

Polygamy explained as being a commandment of God that was received by divine revelation and that polygamy was a part of God's plan.

==== Women's place in heaven ====
Latter-day Saints believed that a woman could secure her place in heaven by being sealed to a righteous man who held the priesthood. Some women embraced polygamy because of this teaching and their desire to receive divine blessings. The salvation of women was understood to be dependent on their status as wives.

==== Posterity ====
One reason given for the practice of polygamy is to increase the Mormon population by childbirth. In the Millennial Star, a church owned and operated newspaper, an article teaches that monogamous marriages result in offspring that are physically and mentally lesser than offspring of polygamous marriages.

==== Morality and preventing temptation ====
An early church leader argued that polygamy has historically been the main form of marriage and that polygamy is the most moral form of marriage. Polygamy was sometimes explained as a way to prevent men from falling into sexual temptation, while monogamy was immoral and increased the likelihood of sexual temptation.

==== Biblical precedence ====
Some who practiced polygamy defended it as a religious practice that was taught in the Bible.

==== Teachings on the multiple wives of God and Jesus ====
Top leaders used the examples of the polygamy of God the Father and Jesus Christ in defense of it and these teachings on God and Jesus' polygamy were widely accepted among Latter-day Saints by the late 1850s. In 1853, Jedediah M. Grant—who later became a member of the First Presidency—stated that the top reason behind the persecution of Christ and his disciples was due to their practice of polygamy. Two months later, apostle Orson Pratt taught in a church periodical that "We have now clearly shown that God the Father had a plurality of wives", and that after her death, Mary (the mother of Jesus) may have become another eternal polygamous wife of God. He also stated that Christ had multiple wives—Mary of Bethany, Martha, and Mary Magdalene—as further evidence in defense of polygamy. In the next two years the apostle Orson Hyde also stated during two general conference addresses that Jesus practiced polygamy and repeated this in an 1857 address.

=== Modern teachings of the church ===
In a teaching manual published by the church in 2015, the practice of polygamy is described as a "test of faith" that brought Latter-day Saints closer to God. Other recent church documents point to an increase in children as being why Mormons believe God commanded them to practice polygamy. An article on the church's website states that early Mormons believed that they would receive blessings from God by obeying the commandment of polygamy.

== Polygamous marriages of early church leaders ==
=== Joseph Smith ===
Among historians, there is disagreement as to the precise number of wives Smith married. D. Michael Quinn reports 46, George D. Smith 38, Todd M. Compton 33 (plus eight "possible wives"), and Stewart Davenport 37.

It is unclear with how many of the wives Smith had sexual relations. Some contemporary accounts from Smith's time indicate that he engaged in sexual relations with some of his wives. As of 2007, there were at least twelve early Latter Day Saints who, based on historical documents and circumstantial evidence, had been identified as potential Smith offspring stemming from polygamous marriages. In 2005 and 2007 studies, a geneticist with the Sorenson Molecular Genealogy Foundation stated that they had shown "with 99.9 percent accuracy" that five of these individuals were in fact not Smith descendants: Mosiah Hancock (son of Clarissa Reed Hancock), Oliver Buell (son of Prescindia Huntington Buell), Moroni Llewellyn Pratt (son of Mary Ann Frost Pratt), Zebulon Jacobs (son of Zina Diantha Huntington Jacobs Smith), and Orrison Smith (son of Fanny Alger). The remaining seven have yet to be conclusively tested, including Josephine Lyon, for whom current DNA testing using mitochondrial DNA cannot provide conclusive evidence either way. Lyon's mother, Sylvia Sessions Lyon, left her daughter a deathbed affidavit telling her she was Smith's daughter.

=== Other early church leaders ===
LDS Church president Brigham Young had 51 wives, and 56 children by 16 of those wives.

LDS Church apostle Heber C. Kimball had 43 wives, and had 65 children by 17 of those wives.

== Responses to polygamy ==
=== Mormon response ===
Mormons responded to polygamy with mixed emotions. One historian notes that Mormon women often struggled with the practice and a belief in the divinity of the polygamy commandment was often necessary in accepting it. Records indicate that future church leaders, such as Brigham Young, John Taylor, and Heber C. Kimball, greatly opposed polygamy initially. Documents left by Mormon women describe personal spiritual experiences that led them to accept polygamy. Another historian notes that some Mormon women expressed appreciation for polygamy and its effects.

An early leader of the church, Orson Pratt, defended polygamy by arguing that the practice was a result of divine revelation and that it was protected under the US Constitution as a religious freedom. Following the public announcement of polygamy, members of the church published pamphlets and literature defending the practice. Mormon missionaries were also directed to defend polygamy.

=== Non-Mormon response ===
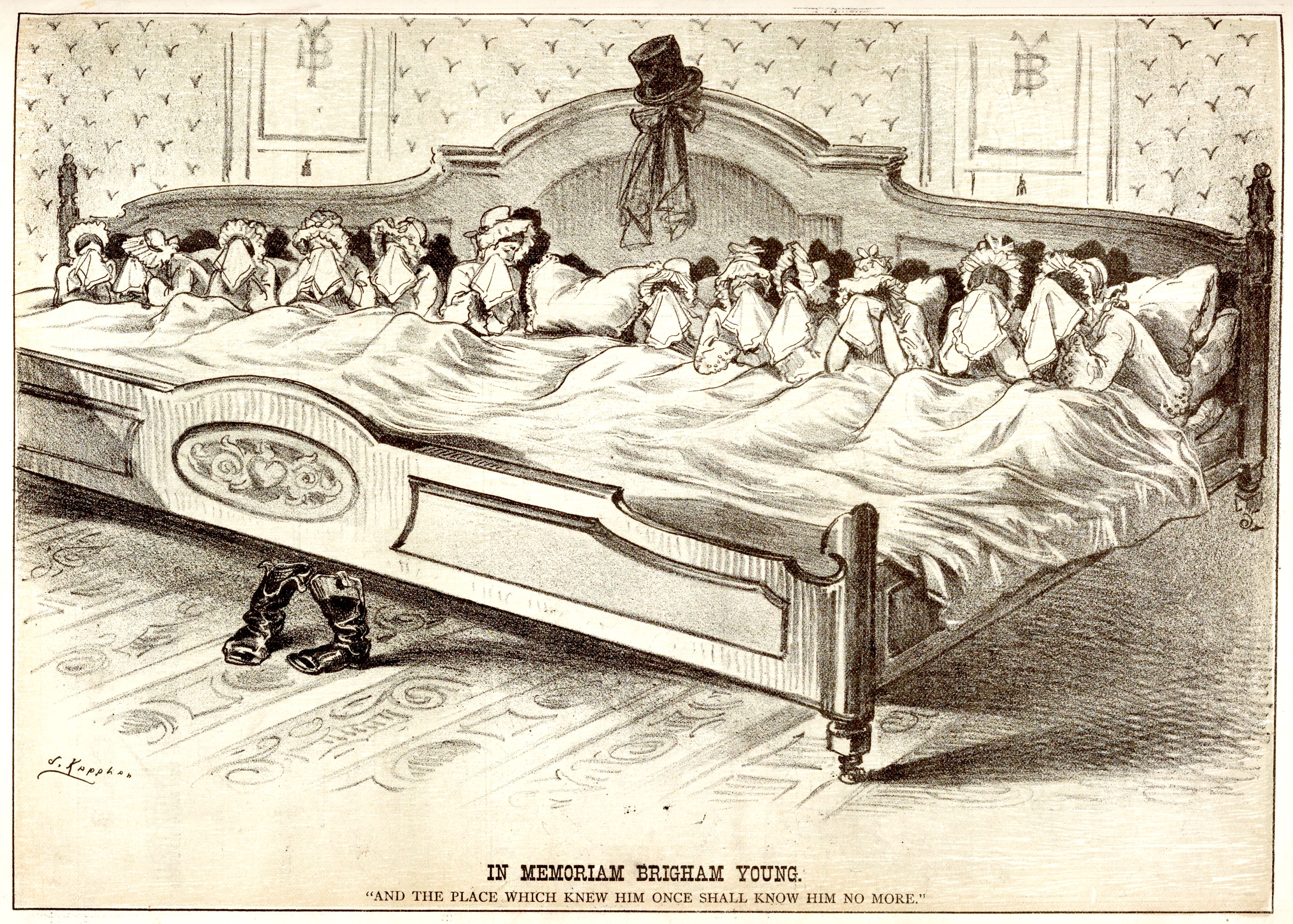
A caricature of Brigham Young's wives, published in Puck following his death in 1877.

The majority of Americans who were not members of the church were opposed to polygamy as they saw the practice as a violation of American values and morals. Opponents of polygamy believed that polygamy forced wives into submission to their husbands and some described polygamy as a form of slavery. The overall opposition to polygamy led the Republican Party's platform to refer to it as one of "the twin relics of barbarism". Sensational and often violent novels provided fictional stories about polygamy which fueled the public's dislike for the practice and Mormons.

However, some non-Mormons held more positive views of polygamy. For example, after surveying the Utah Territory, Captain Howard Stansbury concluded that most polygamous marriages were successful and there were good feelings between families.

==== John C. Bennett and The History of the Saints ====
John C. Bennett was a member of the church and close friend of Joseph Smith who was disfellowshipped and later excommunicated for adultery. Following his excommunication, Bennett began to travel around the eastern United States as he lectured about the church. In his lectures, Bennett included claims of sexual misconduct among church leaders, secret rituals, and violence. In 1842, Bennett published a book entitled The History of the Saints: Or, An Exposé of Joe Smith and Mormonism which includes alleged stories of sexual misconduct by Smith and other church leaders. The church responded to Bennett's claims about Smith by gathering affidavits and printing contradictory evidence in newspapers. The women of the Relief Society, encouraged by its president, Emma Smith, also wrote their experiences that disproved Bennett's statements. They also began a petition in support of Joseph Smith's character which they delivered to the governor of Illinois.

== LDS Church ends performing new polygamous marriages for living ==
=== U.S. government actions against polygamy ===
Mormon polygamy was one of the leading moral issues of the 19th century in the United States, perhaps second only to slavery in importance. Spurred by popular indignation, the U.S. government took a number of steps against polygamy; these were of varying effectiveness. Anti-polygamy laws began to be passed ten years after the church publicly announced the practice of polygamy.

==== Anti-polygamy Bill of 1854 ====
The first legislative attempt to discourage polygamy in Utah was presented in the 33rd Congress. The bill was debated in May 1854. The bill included the provision that any man who had more than one wife would not be able to own land in the Utah Territory. This bill was defeated in the House of Representatives after multiple representatives argued that the federal government did not have the authority to legislate morals in the states.

==== 1857–1858 Utah War ====
As the church settled in what became the Utah Territory, it eventually was subjected to the power and opinion of the United States. Friction first began to show in the James Buchanan administration and federal troops arrived (see Utah War). Buchanan, anticipating Mormon opposition to a newly appointed territorial governor to replace Brigham Young, dispatched 2,500 federal troops to Utah to seat the new governor, thus setting in motion a series of misunderstandings in which the Mormons felt threatened.

==== 1862 Morrill Anti-Bigamy Act ====
In 1862, the Morrill Anti-Bigamy Act became law. The act criminalized the practice of polygamy, unincorporated the church, and limited the church's real estate holdings. The act was largely understood to be unconstitutional and was only enforced in rare cases. While the act outlawed bigamy in the US territories, it was seen to be largely weak and ineffective at preventing people from practicing polygamy. However, due to the continuous threat of legislation targeting polygamy and the church, Brigham Young pretended to comply.

On January 6, 1879, the Supreme Court upheld the Morrill Anti-Bigamy Act in Reynolds v. United States.

==== Wade, Cragin, and Cullom Bills ====
The Wade, Cragin, and Cullom Bills were anti-bigamy legislation that failed to pass in the US Congress. The bills were all intended to enforce the Morrill Act's prohibition on polygamy with more punitive measures. The Wade Bill of 1866 had the power to dismantle local government in Utah. Three years after the Wade Bill failed, the Cragin Bill, which would have eliminated the right to a jury for bigamy trials, was introduced but not passed. After that, the Cullom Bill was introduced. One of the most concerning parts of the Cullom Bill for polygamists was that, if passed, anyone who practiced any type of non-monogamous relationship would not be able to become a citizen of the United States, vote in elections, or receive the benefits of the homestead laws. The leadership of the church publicly opposed the Cullom Bill. Op-eds in church-owned newspapers declared the bill as unjust and dangerous to Mormons.

The introduction of the Cullom Bill led to protests by Mormons, particularly Mormon women. Women organized indignation meetings to voice their disapproval of the bill. The strong reaction of Mormon women surprised many onlookers and politicians. Outside of the church, Mormon women were seen as weak and oppressed by their husbands and the men of the church. The political activism in support of polygamy of Mormon women was unexpected from a group that had been portrayed as powerless.

==== 1874 Poland Act ====
Following the failure of the Wade, Cragin, and Collum Bills, the Poland Act was an anti-bigamy prosecution act that was successfully enacted by the 43rd United States Congress. The Poland Act, named after its sponsor in the US House of Representatives, attempted to prosecute Utah under the Morrill Anti-Bigamy Act for refusing to stop practicing polygamy. The act stripped away some of Utah's powers and gave the federal government greater control over the territory. Among other powers, the act gave US district courts jurisdiction in the Utah Territory for all court cases. The Poland Act allowed for men who had multiple wives to be criminally indicted, which included many LDS men of the time.

==== 1882 Edmunds Act ====
In February 1882, George Q. Cannon, a prominent leader in the church, was denied a non-voting seat in the U.S. House of Representatives due to his polygamous relations. This revived the issue of polygamy in national politics. One month later, the Edmunds Act was passed by Congress, amending the Morrill Act and made polygamy a felony punishable by a $500 fine and five years in prison. "Unlawful cohabitation", in which the prosecution did not need to prove that a marriage ceremony had taken place (only that a couple had lived together), was a misdemeanor punishable by a $300 fine and six months imprisonment. It also revoked the right of polygamists to vote or hold office and allowed them to be punished without due process. Even if people did not practice polygamy, they would have their rights revoked if they confessed a belief in it. In August, Rudger Clawson was imprisoned for continuing to cohabit with wives that he married before the 1862 Morrill Act.

==== 1887 Edmunds–Tucker Act ====
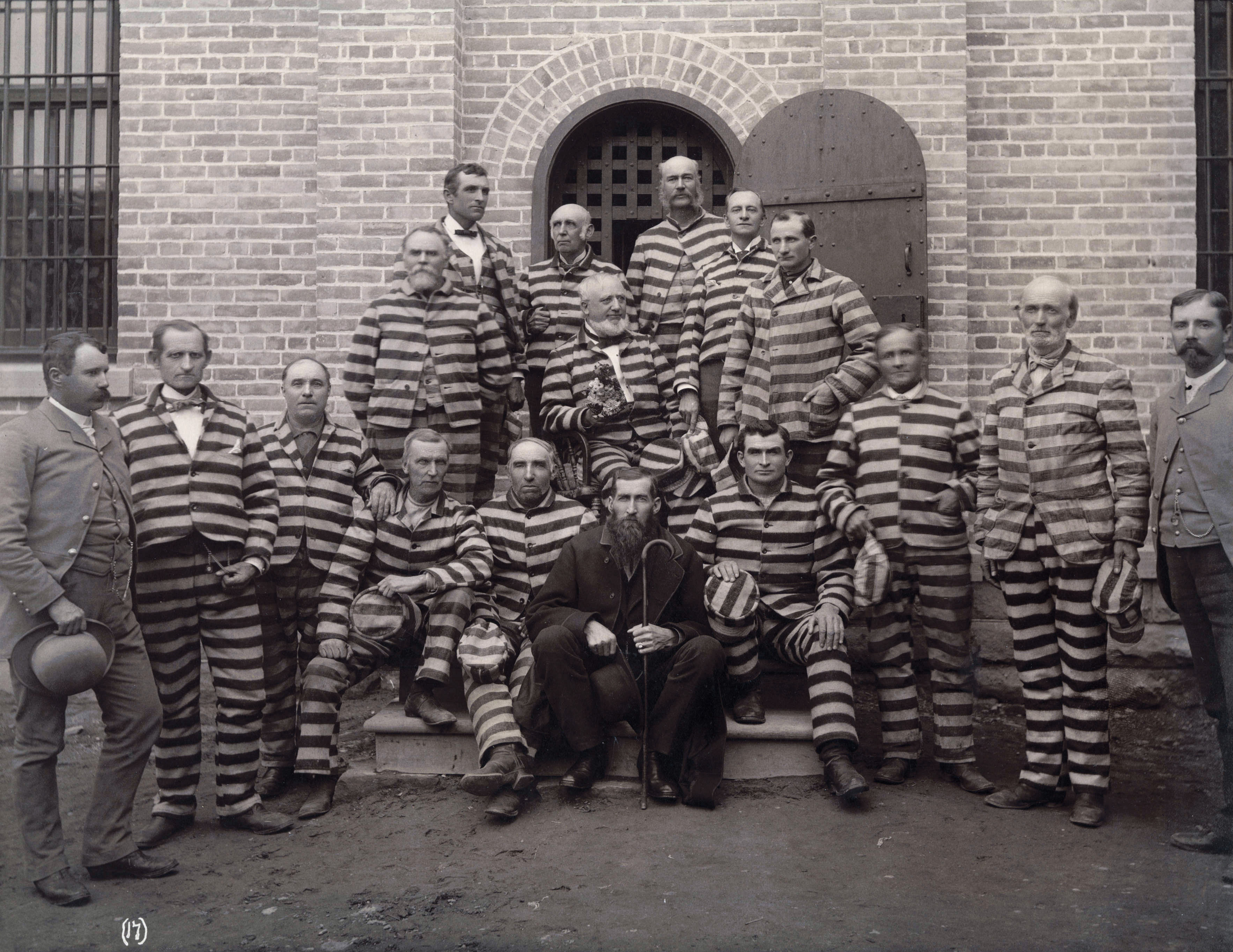
Polygamists, including George Q. Cannon, imprisoned under the Edmunds–Tucker Act, at the Utah Penitentiary in 1889.

In 1887, the Edmunds–Tucker Act allowed the disincorporation of the LDS Church and the seizure of church property; it also further extended the punishments of the Edmunds Act. On July 31 of the same year, U.S. Attorney General George Peters filed suit to seize all church assets.

The church was losing control of the territorial government, and many members and leaders were being actively pursued as fugitives. Without being able to appear publicly, the leadership was left to navigate "underground".

Following the passage of the Edmunds–Tucker Act, the church found it difficult to operate as a viable institution. After visiting priesthood leaders in many settlements, church president Wilford Woodruff left for San Francisco on September 3, 1890, to meet with prominent businessmen and politicians. He returned to Salt Lake City on September 21, determined to obtain divine confirmation to pursue a course that seemed to be agonizingly more and more clear. As he explained to church members a year later, the choice was between, on the one hand, continuing to practice polygamy and thereby losing the temples, "stopping all the ordinances therein" and, on the other, ceasing to practice polygamy in order to continue performing the essential ordinances for the living and the dead. Woodruff hastened to add that he had acted only as the Lord directed.

==== 1879 Reynolds vs. United States ====
In 1879, the Supreme Court ruled that a defendant cannot claim a religious obligation as a valid defense to a crime and upheld the Morrill Anti-Bigamy Act in Reynolds v. United States. The Court said that while holding a religious belief was protected under the First Amendment right of freedom of religion, practicing a religious belief that broke the law was not. Reynolds vs. United States was the Supreme Court's first case in which a party used the right of freedom of religion as a defense. The ruling concluded that Mormons could be charged with committing bigamy despite their religious beliefs.

=== 1890 Manifesto banning new polygamous marriages ===
The final element in Woodruff's revelatory experience came on the evening of September 23, 1890. The following morning, he reported to some of the general authorities that he had struggled throughout the night with the Lord regarding the path that should be pursued. The result was a 510-word handwritten manuscript which stated his intentions to comply with the law and denied that the church continued to solemnize or condone polygamous marriages. The document was later edited by George Q. Cannon of the First Presidency and others to its present 356 words. On October 6, 1890, it was presented to the Latter-day Saints at the General Conference and unanimously approved.

While many church leaders in 1890 regarded the Manifesto as inspired, there were differences among them about its scope and permanence. Contemporary opinions include the contention that the manifesto was more related to an effort to achieve statehood for the Utah territory. Some leaders were reluctant to terminate a long-standing practice that was regarded as divinely mandated. As a result, over 200 polygamous marriages were performed between 1890 and 1904.

=== 1904 Second Manifesto ===
It was not until 1904, under the leadership of church president Joseph F. Smith, that the church completely banned new polygamous marriages worldwide. Not surprisingly, rumors persisted of marriages performed after the 1890 Manifesto, and beginning in January 1904, testimony given in the Smoot hearings made it clear that polygamy had not been completely extinguished.

The ambiguity was ended in the General Conference of April 1904, when Smith issued the "Second Manifesto", an emphatic declaration that prohibited new polygamous marriages and proclaimed that offenders would be subject to church discipline. It declared that any who participated in additional plural marriages, and those officiating, would be excommunicated from the church. Those disagreeing with the Second Manifesto included apostles Matthias F. Cowley and John W. Taylor, who both resigned from the Quorum of the Twelve. Cowley retained his membership in the church, but Taylor was later excommunicated.

Although the Second Manifesto ended the official practice of new polygamous marriages, existing ones were not automatically dissolved. Many Mormons, including prominent church leaders, maintained their polygamy into the 1940s and 1950s.

In 1943, the First Presidency learned that apostle Richard R. Lyman was cohabitating with a woman other than his legal wife. As it turned out, in 1925 Lyman had begun a relationship which he defined as a polygamous marriage. Unable to trust anyone else to officiate, Lyman and the woman exchanged vows secretly. By 1943, both were in their seventies. Lyman was excommunicated on November 12, 1943. The Quorum of the Twelve provided the newspapers with a one-sentence announcement, stating that the ground for excommunication was violation of the law of chastity.

== Polygamy in other churches in the Latter Day Saint movement ==
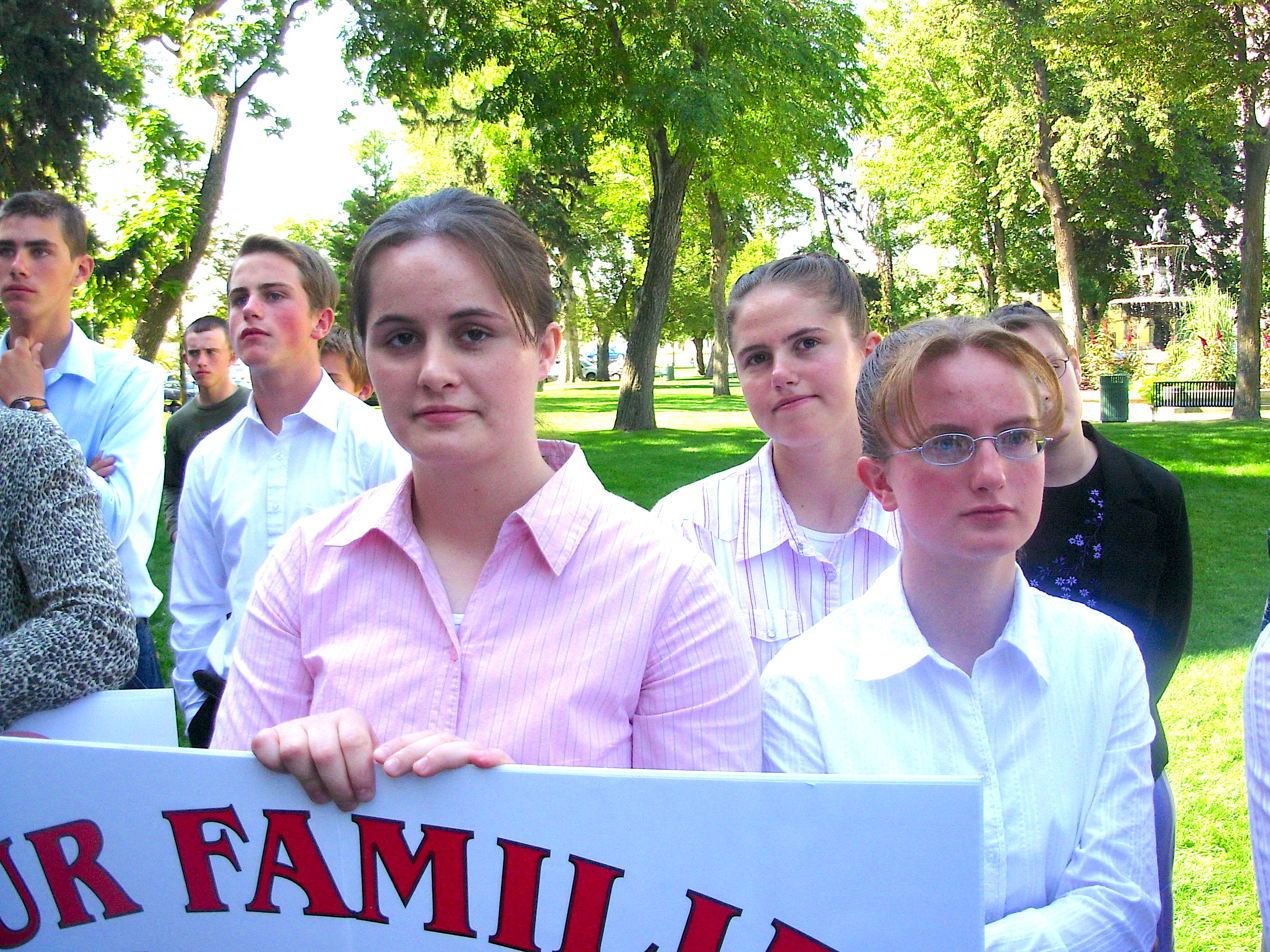
Teens from polygamous families along with over 200 supporters demonstrate at a pro-polygamy rally in Salt Lake City in 2006

Over time, many of those who rejected the LDS Church's relinquishment of polygamy formed small, close-knit communities in areas of the Rocky Mountains. These groups continue to practice "the Principle". In the 1940s, LDS Church apostle Mark E. Petersen coined the term "Mormon fundamentalist" to describe such people. Fundamentalists either practice as individuals, as families, or as part of organized denominations. Today, the LDS Church objects to the use of the term "Mormon fundamentalists" and suggests using the term "polygamist sects" to avoid confusion about whether the main body of Mormon believers teach or practice polygamy. The Fundamentalist Church of Jesus Christ of Latter-Day Saints (also referred to as the FLDS Church) continues to practice polygamy.

== Modern plural marriage theory within the LDS Church ==
Although the LDS Church has abandoned the practice of plural marriage, it has not abandoned the underlying doctrines of polygamy. It is still the practice of monogamous Mormon couples to be sealed to one another. However, in some circumstances, men and women may be sealed to multiple spouses. Most commonly, a man may be sealed to multiple wives: if his first wife dies, he may be sealed to a second wife. A deceased woman may also be sealed to multiple men, but only through vicarious sealing if they are also deceased.

=== Multiple sealings when a prior spouse has died ===
In the case where a man's first wife dies, and the man remarries, and both of the marriages involve a sealing, LDS authorities teach that in the afterlife, the man will enter a polygamous relationship with both wives. Former President of the Church Russell M. Nelson and current President Dallin H. Oaks are examples of such a case.

Under LDS Church policy, a man whose sealed wife has died does not have to request any permission beyond having a current temple recommend and an interview with his bishop to get final permission for a living ordinance, to be married in the temple and sealed to another woman, unless the new wife's circumstance requires a cancellation of sealing. However, a woman whose sealed husband has died is still bound by the original sealing and must request a cancellation of sealing to be sealed to another man (see next paragraph for exception to this after she dies). In some cases, women in this situation who wish to remarry choose to be married to a subsequent husband and are not sealed to them, leaving them sealed to their first husband for eternity.

As of 1998, however, women who have died may be sealed to more than one man. In 1998, the LDS Church created a new policy that a woman may also be sealed to more than one man. A woman, however, may not be sealed to more than one man while she is alive. She may only be sealed to subsequent partners after both she and her husband(s) have died. Thus, if a widow who was sealed to her first husband remarries, she may be sealed by proxy to all of her subsequent husband(s), but only after both she and the subsequent husbands have died. Proxy sealings, like proxy baptisms, are merely offered to the person in the afterlife, indicating that the purpose is to allow the woman to choose the right man to be sealed to. This caveat is necessary to comply with Jesus's teaching in Mark 12, wherein he teaches the law of marriage with regards to the question of widows remarrying.

In the twenty-first century, church leadership has taught that doctrinal knowledge about the nature of family relations in the afterlife is limited and there is no official church teaching on how multiple marriages in life play out in the afterlife beyond trust in God that such matters will work out happily.

=== Multiple sealings when marriages end in divorce ===
A man who is sealed to a woman but later divorced must apply for a "sealing clearance" from the First Presidency in order to be sealed to another woman. Receiving clearance does not void or invalidate the first sealing. A woman in the same circumstances would apply to the First Presidency for a "cancellation of sealing" (sometimes called a "temple divorce"), allowing her to be sealed to another man. This approval voids the original sealing as far as the woman is concerned. Divorced women who have not applied for a sealing cancellation are considered sealed to the original husband. According to Drs. Joseph Stuart and Janiece Johnson of the Neal A. Maxwell Institute for Religious Scholarship, even in the afterlife the marriage relationship is voluntary, so no person could be forced into an eternal relationship through a temple sealing they do not wish to be in. Divorced women may also be granted a cancellation of sealing, even though they do not intend to marry someone else. In this case, they are no longer regarded as being sealed to anyone and are presumed to have the same eternal status as unwed women.

=== Proxy sealings where both spouses have died ===
According to church policy, after a man has died, he may be sealed by proxy to all of the women to whom he was legally married while he was alive. The same is true for women; however, if a woman was sealed to a man while she was alive, all of her husbands must be deceased before she can be sealed by proxy to them.

Church doctrine is not entirely specific on the status of men or women who are sealed by proxy to multiple spouses. There are at least two possibilities:

1. Regardless of how many people a man or woman is sealed to by proxy, they will only remain with one of them in the afterlife, and that the remaining spouses, who might still merit the full benefits of exaltation that come from being sealed, would then marry another person in order to ensure each has an eternal marriage.
2. These sealings create effective plural marriages that will continue after death. There are no church teachings clarifying whether polyandrous relationships can exist in the afterlife, so some church members doubt whether this possibility would apply to women who are sealed by proxy to multiple spouses. The possibility for women to be sealed to multiple men is a recent policy change enacted in 1998. Church leaders have neither explained this change, nor its doctrinal implications.

== Criticism of LDS polygamy ==
=== Instances of unhappy polygamous marriage ===
Critics of polygamy in the early LDS Church claim that polygamy produced unhappiness in some wives. Historian Todd Compton, in his book In Sacred Loneliness, described various cases where some wives in polygamous marriages were unhappy with polygamy.

=== A means for immoral sexual gratification ===
Critics of polygamy in the early LDS Church claim that church leaders established the practice of polygamy in order to further their immoral desires for sexual gratification with multiple sexual partners. Critics point to the fact that church leaders practiced polygamy in secret from 1833 to 1852, despite a written church doctrine (Doctrine and Covenants 101, 1835 edition) renouncing polygamy and stating that only monogamous marriages were permitted.

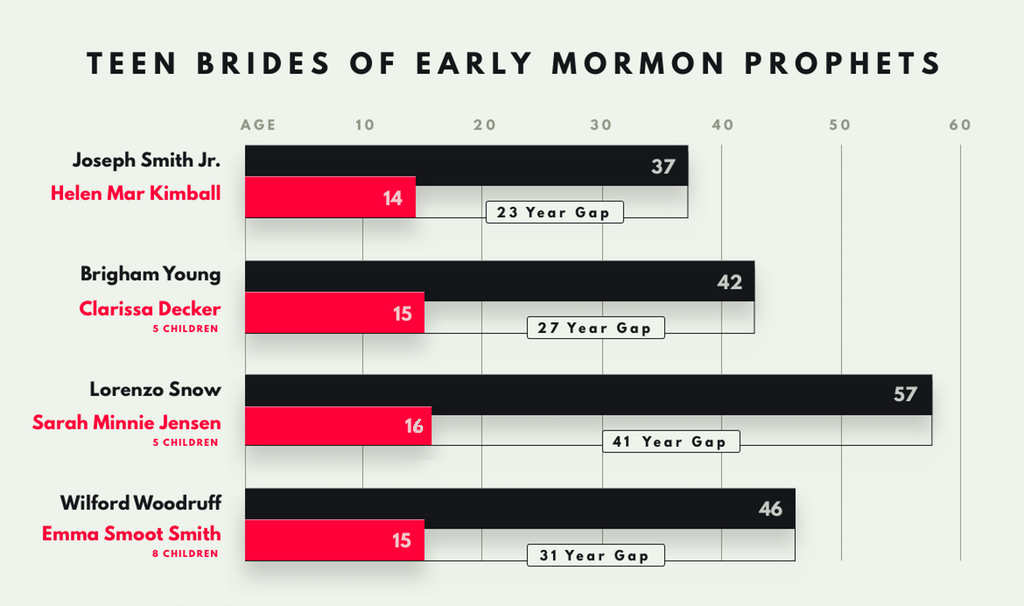
Bar chart showing age differences at the time of polygamous marriage between teenage brides and early Latter Day Saint church leaders. The average age of first marriage for white US women from 1850 to 1880 was 23.

=== Underage polygamous marriages ===
Historian George D. Smith studied 153 men who took multiple wives in the early years of the Latter Day Saint movement, and found that two of the girls were thirteen years old, 13 girls were fourteen years old, 21 were fifteen years old, and 53 were sixteen years old. Historian Todd Compton believes that Joseph Smith married one girl who was fourteen-years old (possibly two); according to Compton, "it is unlikely that the marriage was consummated". (Note: These were Helen Mar Kimball and Nancy Maria Winchester. Kimball was fourteen-years old when Smith married her in May 1843; Winchester was either fourteen or fifteen, as the date of her marriage to Smith in relation to her birthday is uncertain. On nonconsummation, Compton states, "my judgment is that it is unlikely that the marriage was consummated" and "it is not just not certain, it is unlikely, in my judgment".) Historian Stanley Hirshon documented cases of girls aged 10 and 11 being married to old men.

The mean age of marriage for women was lower in Mormon polygamy than in New England and the Northeastern states (the societies in which Smith and many early converts to the movement had lived), and this was partly caused by the practice of polygamy, and Compton concludes that "[e]arly marriage and very early marriage were… accepted" in early Mormonism. These marriages were frequently dynastic in purpose, meant to join people to the families of leaders, motivated by the significance of marriage for the nineteenth-century Latter-day Saint understanding of the afterlife. According to Compton, the "valid parallel" for Mormon early marriages is the "American and European history of elite early marriages that were not consummated until the marriage participants were much older". Compton "find[s] dynastic marriages of teenage girls problematic, even if sexual consummation is delayed".

=== Unmarried men ===
If some men have several wives and the numbers of men and women are approximately equal, some men will necessarily be left without wives. In the denominations that still practice polygamy today, such men, known as lost boys are often driven out so as not to compete with high-ranked polygamous men.

== See also ==
- Current state of polygamy in the Latter Day Saint movement
- Criticism of the Latter Day Saint movement
- The Church of Jesus Christ of Latter-day Saints and politics in the United States
- Marriage in The Church of Jesus Christ of Latter-day Saints
- Short Creek raid
- Sister Wives
