= Hiram Booth =

American politician

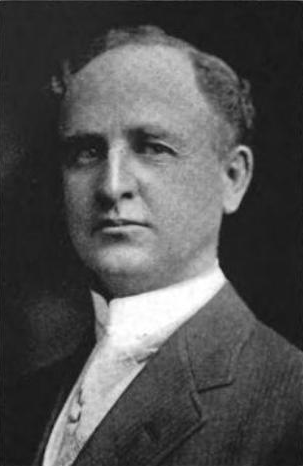

United States Attorney for Utah
- In office 1906–1914
- Preceded by: Joseph Lippman
- Succeeded by: William W. Ray

Member of the Utah State Senate
- In office 1895–1897

Member of the Utah Territorial Assembly
- In office 1894

Personal details
- Born: Hiram Evans Booth; October 25, 1860; Postville, Iowa, U.S.
- Died: July 9, 1940 (aged 79); Los Angeles, California, U.S.
- Political party: Republican
- Spouses: Carrie M. Robinson (m. 1886; died 1887) Lillian B. Redhead (m. 1889)
- Children: 3

Hiram Evans Booth (October 25, 1860 – July 9, 1940) was a Utah State Senator and United States Attorney.

== Biography ==
Hiram Booth was born near Postville, Iowa on October 25, 1860.

A Liberal and then a Republican, Booth was active in Utah politics for decades. He served in the last Utah Territorial Assembly in 1894, and was a senator in the 1st Utah State Legislature from 1895 to 1897. He was United States Attorney for Utah for two terms, beginning in 1906.

== Personal life ==
He married Carrie M. Robinson on August 26, 1886 and they had one daughter. However, his wife died in December 1887. He remarried, to Lillian B. Redhead, on May 29, 1889, and they had two children.

He died in Los Angeles on July 9, 1940.
