= Abel John Evans =

American politician

Member of the Utah Senate from the 7th district
- In office 1896–1901

Personal details
- Born: December 20, 1852 Lehi, Utah
- Spouse: Louisa E. Zimmerman
- Occupation: Attorney

Abel John Evans (December 20, 1852 – December 8, 1939) was an American politician and lawyer. Evans was born in Lehi, Utah County, Utah to Abel Evans and Mary Jones. Abel served as a member of the Utah Constitutional Convention in 1895 and as a Utah State Senator during the 1st through 3rd Utah State Legislatures (1896–1901).

When Evans was about 12 his father died. Evans' father was serving as a missionary in Great Britain at the time of his death.

Abel Evans married Louisa E. Zimmerman, the daughter of John Zimmerman and Harriet Lamb, on January 26, 1874. They were the parents of eleven children.

In 1889 Evans served a short-term mission for the LDS Church in England.

From 1880 to 1888 Evans was a member of the Lehi city council. In 1891 he was elected mayor of Utah as a Democrat. He was a delegate to the Utah State Constitutional Convention which wrote the state constitution that was implemented when Utah became a state in 1896.

Evans was served as a counselor to Stephen L. Chipman in the Alpine Stake Presidency beginning in 1901. This stake included most of Utah County north of Provo.

== Sources ==
- Andrew Jenson. LDS Biographical Encyclopedia. Vol. 3, p. 626
