= Joseph R. Murdock =

American politician

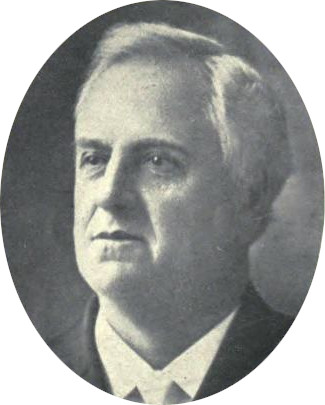

Member of the Utah House of Representatives from the 10th district
- In office January 13, 1896 – January 8, 1899
- Succeeded by: James W. Clyde

Personal details
- Born: August 11, 1858 Salt Lake City, Utah
- Died: May 26, 1931 (aged 72) Salt Lake City, Utah
- Party: Democrat

Joseph Royal Murdock (August 11, 1858 – May 26, 1931) was a member of the Utah State Senate.

Murdock was the son of Nymphas Coridon Murdock and his wife Sarah Melissa Barney. He was born and raised in Salt Lake City, Utah, until he moved to Charleston, Utah at age 13. He attended Brigham Young Academy (the predecessor of Brigham Young University) in its inaugural year. In 1878 he married Margaret Ashbridge Wright (1860–1948). They became the parents of 10 children.

From 1880 to 1882 Murdock served a mission for the LDS Church, primarily in Michigan. He was a delegate to the Utah constitutional convention in 1895 that led to statehood, then served in the first two sessions of the State House of Representatives. He was elected to the Utah State Senate in 1900. Murdock died at the age of 72 in Salt Lake City and his funeral was held in Heber City, Utah.

== Sources ==
- Andrew Jenson. LDS Biographical Encyclopedia. Vol. 1, p. 361.
