= John R. Barnes =

American politician

John Richard Barnes (July 28, 1833 – January 21, 1919) served in the first Utah State Senate.

Barnes was a native of Sandy, Bedfordshire, England. He joined the Church of Jesus Christ of Latter-day Saints in 1848. In 1853, he emigrated from England to Utah. He was for many years ward clerk of the Kaysville ward under bishop Christopher Layton. He was a member of Utah's 1895 Constitutional Convention and elected as a Democrat to the State Senate that same year. He was also a director of Zion's Cooperative Mercantile Institution.
