= Daniel Heiner (Utah politician) =

American politician (1850–1931)

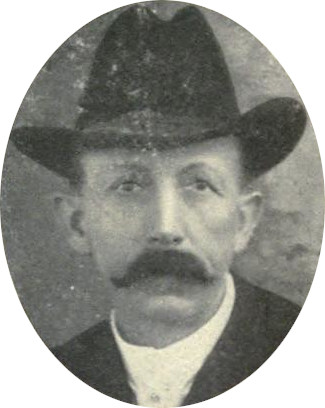
- Born: November 27, 1850; Franklin County, Pennsylvania
- Died: August 8, 1931 (aged 80); Morgan, Utah
- Known for: Served in first Utah state legislature

Daniel Heiner (1850–1931) was a member of the Utah House of Representatives.

Heiner was born on 27 November 1850 in Franklin County, Pennsylvania to Johann Martin Heiner and Adelgunda Dietzel Heiner. When he was nine years old he joined the Church of Jesus Christ of Latter-day Saints along with his parents and shortly after emigrated to Utah. He moved to Morgan County, Utah in 1863 and remained a resident of that place for most of the rest of his life. Heiner died 8 August 1931 in Morgan, Utah.

He was elected to the Utah State House of Representatives for its first term after statehood. In 1900 he was made president of the Morgan Stake of The Church of Jesus Christ of Latter-day Saints. Heiner was president of the First National Bank of Morgan for 16 years.

== Sources ==
- Andrew Jenson, LDS Biographical Encyclopedia, Vol. 1, p. 475.
