= Thomas J. Stevens =

American politician (1848–1900)

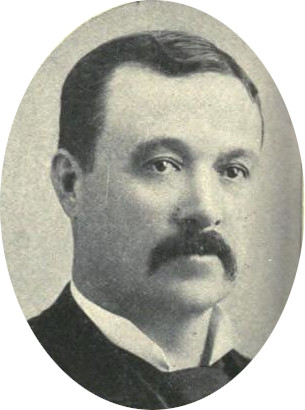
- Born: January 24, 1848; Bristol, England
- Died: August 31, 1900 (aged 52); Ogden, Utah
- Known for: Member of the first Utah State House of Representatives

Thomas Jordan Stevens (January 24, 1848 – August 31, 1900) was a member of the Utah State legislature.

== Early life ==
Stevens was born in Bristol, England. He came to Utah in the Warren S. Snow company of 1864.

== Political career ==
Stevens married Maria Stringham, a daughter of Bryant Stringham, who was a leading herdman working under Brigham Young, often in charge of tithing office herds. They settled in downtown Salt Lake City in the Salt Lake 13th Ward of The Church of Jesus Christ of Latter-day Saints.

Stevens later became a prominent citizen of Ogden, Utah serving as bishop of the Ogden 5th Ward of the Church of Jesus Christ of Latter-day Saints, and treasurer of the Utah Territorial Reform School. He was also a member of the city council of Ogden and for a time the sheriff of Weber County, Utah. In 1895 he was elected to the Utah House of Representatives. He served as a member of the board of trustees of Weber Stake Academy (the predecessor of Weber State University) from 1888-1900. He also served on the commissary generals staff under Heber M. Wells. He was one of the residents of the Jefferson Avenue Historic District.
