= LDS Church and politics in the United States =

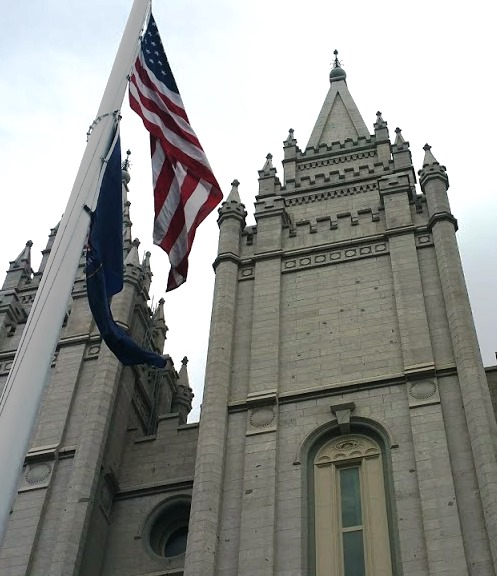
The LDS Church has held notable political influence in the United States, especially in the state of Utah.

Early in its history, the Church of Jesus Christ of Latter-day Saints (LDS Church) had a series of negative encounters with the federal government of the United States. This led to decades of mistrust, armed conflict, and the eventual disincorporation of the church by an act of the United States Congress. The relationship between the church and the government eventually improved, and in recent times LDS Church members have served in leadership positions in Congress and held other important political offices. The LDS Church becomes involved in political matters if it perceives that there is a moral issue at stake and wields considerable influence on a national level with over a dozen members of Congress having membership in the church in the early 2000s, and about 80% of Utah state lawmakers identifying as LDS.

== 19th century ==
Many of the political problems faced by the LDS Church stemmed from the controversial practice of polygamy. The practice started with Joseph Smith, the founder of Mormonism, secretly taking on additional wives and was practiced publicly after his death.

=== Joseph Smith ===
Early LDS scriptures speak favorably of the United States government. The Book of Mormon (published 1830) contains a passage that favorably describes the American Revolution, though in the overall text most of the principles in the US Constitution are "slighted or disregarded altogether". An 1833 revelation from Joseph Smith gives divine credit to the establishment of the United States Constitution.

In 1839, Joseph Smith visited U.S. President Martin Van Buren to plead for the U.S. to help roughly 20,000 LDS settlers of Independence, Missouri. The Governor of Missouri, Lilburn Boggs, in attempt to resolve the 1838 Mormon War, had issued executive order on October 27, 1838, known as the Mormon Extermination Order. It authorized troops to use force against LDS adherents to "exterminate or drive [them] from the state". Smith and his party appealed to members of Congress and to President Van Buren to intercede for his followers. According to Smith's grandnephew, Van Buren said to Smith, "Your cause is just, but I can do nothing for you; if I take up for you I shall lose the vote of Missouri".

After failing to receive the assistance of the President, Smith took his case to the Senate Judiciary Committee chaired by Senator Garret Wall. The Judiciary Committee did nothing to help the LDS people, lacking the political willpower to launch an investigation into the Mormon War. The negative experience with Van Buren marked the beginning of decades of antagonism between the leaders of the Church and government officials. The White Horse Prophecy reportedly followed in 1843, where an adherent recounted that Joseph Smith predicted the United States Constitution would "hang like a thread". The accounting is disputed as an inaccurate account and not accepted as doctrine by the LDS Church.

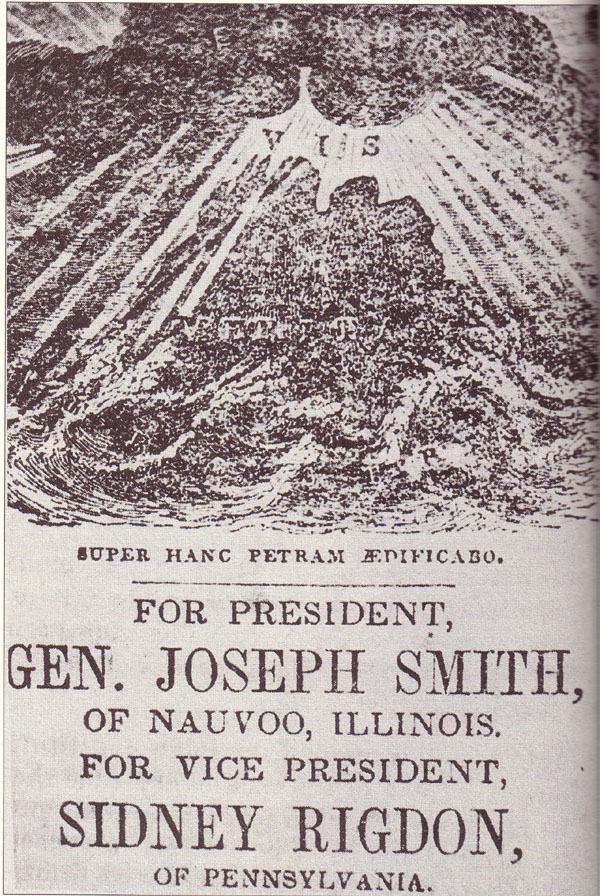
Cover of Smith's 1844 presidential campaign pamphlet stating in Latin "I will build upon this rock" a Biblical allusion.

After his experience with Van Buren and finding no support from any of the other presidential candidates, Smith decided to run as an independent in the 1844 U.S. presidential election. He proposed the redemption of slaves by selling public lands and decreasing the size and salary of Congress; the ceasing of imprisonment of criminals (except in cases of murder); the reformation of criminals via education and public work; the annexation of Texas, Oregon, and parts of Canada; the securing of international rights on high seas; free trade; the re-establishment of a national bank; and the reduction of the public debt. His top aide, Brigham Young, campaigned for Smith saying, "He it is that God of Heaven designs to save this nation from destruction and preserve the Constitution." The campaign ended when Smith was attacked and killed by a mob while in the Carthage, Illinois, jail on June 27, 1844.

When Smith's followers gathered in Nauvoo, Illinois, an Anti-Mormon party sprung up to oppose the Church's political influence in the state.

=== Utah Territory and statehood ===
After Smith's death, the majority of his followers followed Young as Mormon pioneers emigrating to the Salt Lake Valley. Young petitioned President Polk for federal assistance for their westward migration. Assistance came in the form of the enlistment of around 500 Mormons in the U.S. Army during the war with Mexico. The men's salaries were used to help pay for the migration of the larger body of the Saints.

In 1849 the Mormons petitioned Congress that a huge swath of land which they had settled be admitted into the Union as the State of Deseret. The Mormons hoped for statehood so that they would have the ability to elect their own leaders, and hopefully avoid the persecution which they had so recently escaped. Because of their previous experiences, they were convinced that self-governance was the only safeguard to their religious freedom, and they worried about the possible introduction of "unsympathetic carpetbag appointees" if Deseret were relegated to territorial status. Concern over the practice of polygamy as well as other issues made statehood politically unviable. However, Congress instead incorporated "Deseret" into the greatly reduced but still enormous Utah Territory as part of the Compromise of 1850. The compromise struck a delicate balance on the issue of slavery. The Mormons had introduced slavery to the area upon their arrival.

John M. Bernhisel, a Mormon representative in Washington, D.C., strenuously lobbied President Millard Fillmore for an all-Mormon slate of territorial officials. He urged the president that "the people of Utah cannot but consider it their right, as American citizens to be governed by men of their own choice, entitled to their confidence, and united with them in opinion and feeling." The president therefore appointed Brigham Young, as the territory's governor, and assigned prominent positions to several other Mormons. But, Fillmore also gave a number of territorial appointments to non-Mormons. The relationship between the non-Mormon federal officials and the Mormons was frequently contentious. Not long after their appointment, the federal officials, fearing for their safety, abandoned their positions, which were left unfilled for several years.

During the 1856 U.S. presidential election, a key plank of the newly formed Republican Party's platform was a pledge "to prohibit in the territories those twin relics of barbarism: polygamy and slavery." Although polygamy was a focus of the Republican party platform, more than three decades would pass before the LDS Church was stopped from performing new polygamous marriages.

President James Buchanan sent U.S. forces to Utah in 1857–58 in order to appoint a new governor over the territory and take control away from church president Brigham Young. These events were known as the Utah War. The tragic Mountain Meadows Massacre occurred in the context of these events.

At the outbreak of the Civil War, Abraham Lincoln was relieved to receive a telegraphed reassurance from Brigham Young that the Utah territory had no intent to secede from the United States. Lincoln's policy for dealing with the Mormons was to leave them alone. He told a Mormon messenger, "You go back and tell Brigham Young that if he will let me alone I will let him alone." In 1862, congress passed the Morrill Anti-Bigamy Act with the purpose of outlawing polygamy in Mormon territories. However, as part of his decision to leave the Mormons alone, Lincoln choose not to enforce the law.

The passage of the Poland Act in 1874 paved the way for the first prosecutions under the Morrill act from 12 years earlier. Believing the law to be in violation of the first amendment right to the free exercise of religion, Young asked George Reynolds, secretary to the First Presidency, to serve as a defendant for a test case before the Supreme Court. The unanimous decision from the court was to uphold the anti-polygamy laws and Reynolds' sentence of two years in prison.

In 1882, Congress passed the Edmunds Act, which made polygamy a felony. A key aspect of the Edmunds Act was that it was no longer necessary to prove a bigamous marriage took place to get a conviction, cohabitation was enough. More than 1,300 Mormon men were imprisoned under the terms of the act. Church president John Taylor was forced to go into hiding for several years, frequently moving to avoid capture from the federal authorities.

In 1887, Congress enacted the Edmunds–Tucker Act. The act disincorporated the church and seized its assets. The act was also responsible for disenfranchising women, which had been given the right to vote in Utah before any of the 37 states at that time. Women voters in the state were disproportionately Mormon, so giving women the right to vote and rescinding that right was a way to control Mormon influence on elections. The anti-polygamy laws were challenged in court but two Supreme Court rulings (Davis v. Beason and The Late Corporation of the [LDS Church] v. United States) upheld the right of the government to prohibit polygamous marriages and to seize the property of the LDS Church.

A few months after losing its case before the Supreme Court, church president Wilford Woodruff stated that the church had ended the contracting of new polygamous marriages, reversing the long-standing practice of evading or ignoring anti-polygamy laws. Woodruff said that this announcement was the result of a revelation from Jesus Christ. The text of the revelation is known as the 1890 Manifesto. Campaigning against polygamy had been a focus of the Liberal Party. With that issue resolved and with the entrance of the major national parties into the state, the Liberal Party disbanded in 1893. Another effect of the 1890 Manifesto was to weaken any enthusiasm in congress for the passage of more anti-polygamy legislation. This opened up the door for the Utah Territory to be recognized as a state.

In the 1870s, the People's Party was created in Utah Territory and backed by the LDS Church. The anti-Mormon Liberal Party existed at the same time but won few elections. The Salt Lake Tribune was the newspaper of the Liberal Party while the Deseret News supported the pro-Mormon People's Party. Church leaders realized that one obstacle to achieving statehood was that its population did not participate in either of the two major national political parties. It was decided that the People's Party should be disbanded. The Republican Party had opposed statehood for Utah. Because of this, the majority of Mormons in Utah leaned Democrat. However, church leaders did not want to see the entire body of the church turn Democrat leading to a continuation of the status-quo where there was one political party supported by the church and another party opposed to it. George Q. Cannon was sent by the First Presidency of the Church to instruct party leaders to make sure that Church members were split between the Republicans and Democrats. In some instances, local bishops stood in front of their congregations and instructed everyone seated on one side of the building to join one party and those families on the other side should join the other party.

In 1895, Woodruff instituted a rule, informally known as the Mormon Political Manifesto, that general authorities of the church should not seek political office without prior permission of the First Presidency. In 1898, B. H. Roberts became the first church member to be elected to Congress. Due to Roberts being a polygamist, he was refused a seat in the Congress. A special election was held to fill his seat, and William H. King, the congressman who had preceded him, won the election. Roberts later testified during the Smoot Hearings, when opponents of the LDS Church demanded that Republican Reed Smoot, a monogamist, be refused his senate seat because Smoot was a Mormon apostle.

== 20th century ==
In 1903, the Utah State Legislature elected Reed Smoot to the U.S. Senate. Smoot was an apostle in the LDS Church. His election was controversial due to fears over his allegiance to the church. A hearing was held to determine if Smoot should be allowed a seat in the Senate; the hearing lasted four years, called 100 witnesses and generated 3,500 pages of testimony. Ultimately, Smoot was permitted to take his seat in the Senate.

Church president Joseph F. Smith was one of the people subpoenaed to testify in the Smoot hearings. In 1906, Smith was brought to trial on a charge of unlawful cohabitation with four women in addition to his lawful wife; he pleaded guilty and was fined $300, the maximum penalty then permitted under the law. Smith was a supporter of the Republican party.

In 1904, the American Party was formed in Utah in an attempt to revive the anti-Mormon Liberal Party. The party lasted until 1911.

During the administration of Heber J. Grant, an effort was made to remove from church literature, sermons, and ceremonies any suggestion that adherents should seek vengeance on the citizens or government of the United States for past persecutions of the church and its members, and in particular for the assassinations of church founder Joseph Smith and his brother Hyrum. This policy became known as the Good Neighbor policy.

Grant, a Democrat, was opposed to the election of Franklin D. Roosevelt (FDR) and caused a front-page editorial to be written to that effect in the church-owned Deseret News. Grant shared the view of J. Reuben Clark and David O. McKay that the New Deal was socialism, something they all despised. FDR had campaigned on a platform that included the repeal of alcohol prohibition; meanwhile, Grant was a leader in the Utah state Prohibition movement. Despite this, FDR won Utah in each of his four elections. Grant, seeing the majority of the church members supporting FDR, regarded this as "one of the most serious conditions that has confronted me since I became President of the Church." Later, when Utah voters agreed by plebiscite to become the 36th state to ratify the Twenty-first Amendment to the United States Constitution, thus completing the process of ratification and repealing Prohibition, Grant was devastated; in a general conference, he told the audience, "I have never felt so humiliated in my life over anything as that the State of Utah voted for the repeal of Prohibition." (Not unrelated to the passage of prohibition in Utah was Grant's strengthening of the Church's own requirements that its members abstain from alcohol.)

David O. McKay, a Republican who became president of the church in 1951, was able to establish friendly relationships with President Dwight D. Eisenhower. McKay supported church apostle Ezra Taft Benson in his role as Eisenhower's Secretary of Agriculture. President Lyndon B. Johnson invited McKay to visit him in the White House. McKay rarely used his position in the church to speak out on political issues. One instance in which he did was to instruct Mormon congressmen that they should support the right-to-work legislation that was before congress at the time. Some of the congressmen reacted negatively to McKay's message, feeling like it was not the place of their religious leader to tell them how to vote. McKay considered this a religious issue and not a strictly political decision, and in fact apostle Joseph F. Merrill had spoken on this very issue during his address at the Church's recent General Conference.

During the 1968 election, George W. Romney became the first LDS person to stage a credible run for the presidency. By this time, he was well known as a member of the LDS Church and perhaps the most nationally visible one since Brigham Young. But his membership in the LDS Church was scarcely mentioned at all during the campaign. Romney did not receive the nomination, but after the election Nixon appointed him to his cabinet as United States Secretary of Housing and Urban Development.

During the administration of Spencer W. Kimball, the church spoke out in opposition to the Equal Rights Amendment and the establishment of MX Peacekeeper missile bases in Utah and Nevada.

In the 1990s, the church played an important role in defeating same-sex marriage legalization in Hawaii (Amendment 2) and Alaska (Measure 2).

== 21st century ==
In 2004, church president Gordon B. Hinckley was awarded the Presidential Medal of Freedom by George W. Bush.

In the 21st century the church played an important role in defeating same-sex marriage legalization in Nebraska (Initiative 416), Nevada (Question 2), California (Prop 22), and Utah (Amendment 3).

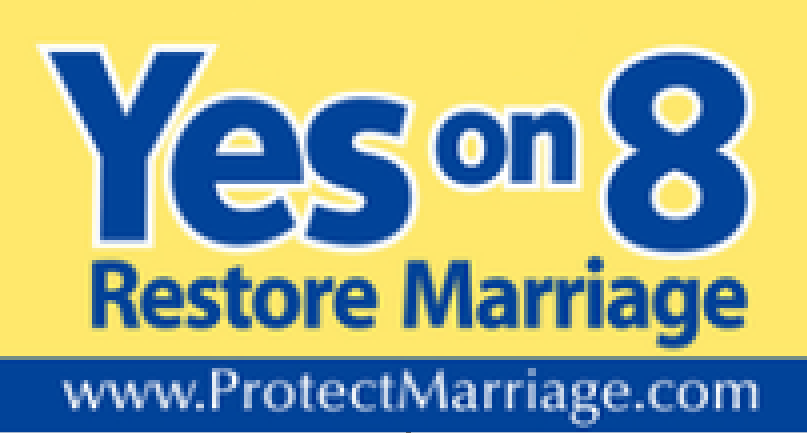
The church distributed hundreds of thousands of these Protect Marriage Coalition lawn signs during their involvement with the pro-Prop 8 campaign.

When Mitt Romney, son of former presidential candidate George Romney, campaigned for President of the United States in 2012 as the Republican Party nominee, it was the first time that a member of the LDS Church received the nomination from one of the two major American political parties. At the time, the U.S. Senate Majority Leader, Harry Reid, was also a member of the LDS Church. In 2015, Orrin Hatch, also a member of the church, became President pro tempore of the United States Senate.

A 2012 Pew Center survey on Religion and Public Life indicates that 74 percent of U.S. Mormons lean towards the Republican Party. Some liberal members have stated that they feel that they have to defend their worthiness due to political differences. In recent decades since the 1968 presidential election, the Republican Party has consistently won a majority of the LDS vote in most national and state-level elections. As a result, Utah, a state with a majority LDS population, is also one of the most heavily Republican states in the country.

During Donald Trump's 2016 presidential campaign, Trump struggled with Mormon voters, affecting his party's grip on Utah, where Mormons constitute a majority, and Nevada, where they are a significant minority. Reasons for this include Trump's rhetoric concerning Muslims, which Mormons see as a parallel to their own historic persecution. Following the release of the 2016 Access Hollywood tape, several high-profile Mormon political leaders from Utah, including Utah governor Gary Herbert and representative Jason Chaffetz, withdrew their endorsements for Trump. The Deseret News, a media outlet owned by the church, broke with an 80-year tradition of refraining from presidential endorsements to publish an editorial calling on Trump to step aside. Trump won all 6 of Utah's Electoral College votes in the 2016 election winning with 45.54% of the vote.

In response to the August 2017 Unite the Right rally in Charlottesville, Virginia, the church issued a statement of concern over racism, intolerance, and hatred — calling for peace and understanding, and for treating "one another with greater kindness, compassion and goodness." This has been described by a Brigham Young University historian as "perhaps the most direct official statement condemning racism and white supremacy in the LDS Church's history." This statement was rejected as heretical by Ayla Stewart (an alt-right Mormon blogger who was prevented from appearing at the rally due to the risk of violence). In Utah, LDS Church members have expressed their support for Trump, in particular his policies on land and anti-environmentalism. In January 2018 his approval rating among Latter-day Saints was 61 percent, higher than any other religious group (and 31 points higher than Protestants and others).

In November 2022, the church released a statement in support of the Respect for Marriage Act, a bill which would require the states and the federal government to recognize legally performed same-sex marriages.

=== Liberal Latter-day Saints ===
Democrats and those who lean Democratic made up 18% of church members surveyed in the 2014 Pew Research Center's Religious Landscape Survey. That percentage increased to 26% of church members affiliating with the Democratic Party by 2022, according to Harvard University's Cooperative Election Study. There has been at least two Democratic senators and members of the church: William H. King and Harry Reid. In addition, there have been groups of LDS people that support liberal candidates, including forming the organization Latter-day Saints for Biden-Harris in the 2020 presidential election season. Other examples include the ward in Berkeley, California pushing back against 2008 California Proposition 8, a ballot proposition and a state constitutional amendment intended to ban same-sex marriage, and other members of the church advocating for Mormon feminism (which the church has historically discouraged with blanket statements of policy, but recently advocated a more nuanced stance).

== See also ==
- Homosexuality and the LDS Church
- Marriage in the LDS Church
- Mormonism and polygamy
- Mormonism and women
- Women's suffrage in Utah
