= Philip T. Van Zile =

American politician and judge

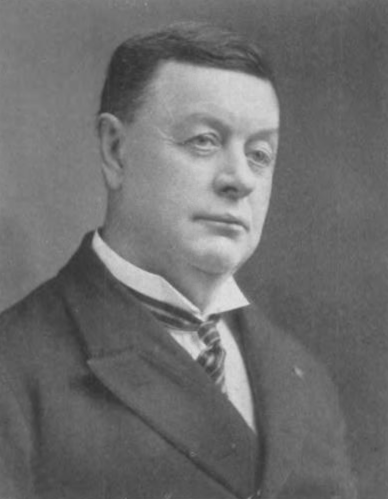
- Born: Philip Taylor Van Zile; July 20, 1843; Osceola Township, Pennsylvania
- Died: October 26, 1917 (aged 74); Detroit, Michigan
- Education: Alfred University; University of Michigan
- Occupations: Politician, judge
- Political party: Liberal; Republican

Philip Taylor Van Zile (July 20, 1843 – October 26, 1917) was a politician and judge from the U.S. state of Michigan.

== Biography ==
Van Zile's grave at Maple Hill Cemetery

Van Zile was born in Osceola Township, Pennsylvania on July 20, 1843. He prepared for college at Union Academy near Knoxville, then entered the classical course of Alfred University and graduated in 1863. He enlisted in the Union Army, and served in Battery E. First Ohio Light Artillery until the end of the American Civil War. He received his discharge in August 1865.

With the opening of the fall term of the University of Michigan, Van Zile entered the law department and graduated in the spring of 1867. He then went to Charlotte, Michigan and was admitted to the bar and began the practice of law. In the fall of 1868 he was elected prosecuting attorney and re-elected in 1870. In 1872 he was elected as a probate judge, and in 1875 was chosen circuit judge of the 5th district.

In 1878 on the recommendation of U.S. Senators Thomas W. Ferry and Isaac P. Christiancy and Representative Jonas H. McGowan, Van Zile accepted an appointment to the office of U.S. District Attorney for the Utah Territory from President Rutherford B. Hayes, as authorized by the Poland Act. On April 1, 1878, he resigned as circuit judge and left for Salt Lake City, where he served for nearly six years.

As part of his duties as District Attorney, Van Zile enforced existing anti-Mormon laws, including the Morrill Anti-Bigamy Act and the Poland Act. In 1882 Congress passed the Edmunds Act, which revoked key civil rights from target individuals without trial or due process. Among other things it revoked polygamists' right to vote, made them ineligible for jury service, and prohibited them from holding political office. This forced the retirement of George Q. Cannon, who had been a delegate in Congress for ten years. Van Zile subsequently lost an 1882 election on the Liberal Party ticket to fill Cannon's seat in Congress. Of the 33,266 registered voters, Van Zile received 4,884 votes, while John T. Caine of the Peoples Party received 23,039 votes. About 12,000 people were excluded from registering based on suspicion of polygamy.

In 1884 Van Zile returned from Utah to Michigan. In the presidential campaign of James G. Blaine, Van Zile was chosen by the convention, in his absence, to be chairman of the Michigan Republican Party. He served as chairman for two years.

Van Zile moved to Detroit in 1899 and the following year became a lecturer in the Detroit College of Law, and shortly after was elected dean of the college. He was also chosen Grand Commander of Knights Templar of Michigan in 1900. In 1894 Alfred University conferred upon him the degree of Doctor of Philosophy and in 1904 that of Doctor of Laws. His publications include Van Zile's Bailments and Carriers, and Van Zile's Equity Pleading and Practice.

He died at his home in Detroit on October 26, 1917, and was buried at Maple Hill Cemetery in Charlotte.

Party political offices
| Preceded by Edward S. Lacey | Chairman of the Michigan Republican Party; 1884– 1886 | Succeeded by James McMillan |
