= Davis v. Beason =

- Supreme Court of the United States

Argued December 9–10, 1889 Decided February 3, 1890
- Full case name: Davis v. Beason, Sheriff.
- Citations: 133 U.S. 333 (more) 10 S. Ct. 299; 33 L. Ed. 637; 1890 U.S. LEXIS 1915

Holding
- Courts of the United States have jurisdiction to hear charges related to polygamy, even though it is a part of religious belief.

Court membership
- Chief Justice Melville Fuller Associate Justices Samuel F. Miller · Stephen J. Field; Joseph P. Bradley · John M. Harlan; Horace Gray · Samuel Blatchford; Lucius Q. C. Lamar II · David J. Brewer

Case opinion
- Majority: Field, joined by unanimous

Laws applied
- Amendment I

Davis v. Beason, 133 U.S. 333 (1890), was a United States Supreme Court case affirming, by a 9–0 vote, that federal laws against polygamy did not conflict with the Free Exercise Clause of the First Amendment to the United States Constitution.

== Background ==
Congress had passed the Edmunds Act in 1882, which made polygamy a felony; over 1,300 Mormons were imprisoned. The Act also required test oaths requiring voters to swear they were not bigamists or polygamists. A statute of the Idaho Territory required a similar oath in order to register to vote, in order to limit or eliminate Mormons' participation in government and their control of local schools. The loyalty oath also forbade being a member of any organization that advocated or spent resources defending bigamy or polygamy.

Mormons initiated a challenge to Idaho's oath test by having members who did not have plural marriages registering to vote. Samuel D. Davis, a resident of Oneida County, Idaho, was convicted in the territorial district court of swearing falsely after taking the voter's oath. Davis appealed his conviction via a habeas corpus writ, claiming that the Idaho law requiring the oath violated his right to the free exercise of his religion as a member of the LDS Church.

== Supreme Court ruling ==
Justice Field, writing for the Court, condemned polygamy, writing that "Few crimes are more pernicious to the best interests of society, and receive more general or more deserved punishment." He went on to echo Reynolds v. United States (1878): "However free the exercise of religion may be, it must be subordinate to the criminal laws of the country, passed with reference to actions regarded by general consent as properly the subjects of punitive legislation." He wrote by way of comparison that if a religious sect advocated fornication or human sacrifice, "swift punishment would follow the carrying into effect of its doctrines, and no heed would be given to the pretense that, as religious beliefs, their supporters could be protected in their exercise by the Constitution of the United States."

Field listed the limits that federal law placed upon the rights of United States territories to qualify voters, noted Idaho's specific prohibition of polygamists and people encouraging polygamy from the right to vote, and wrote that this was "not open to any constitutional or legal objection," as the Idaho law "simply excludes from the privilege of voting ... those who have been convicted of certain offenses".

== Subsequent events ==
Following decades of federal efforts to end the practice of polygamy by members of The Church of Jesus Christ of Latter-day Saints, the Davis v. Beason decision may have been a significant consideration which helped convince LDS prophet and president Wilford Woodruff that the time had come to stop sanctioning additional plural marriages, as announced in his Manifesto of September, 1890.

Richard Morgan wrote, "The decision became one of the principal underpinnings of what later came to be called the 'secular regulation' approach to the free exercise clause whereby no religious exemptions are required from otherwise valid secular regulations."

106 years later, in Romer v. Evans (1996), the Supreme Court ruled unconstitutional a Colorado constitutional initiative that prevented any jurisdiction from protecting homosexual citizens from discrimination. In the dissent, Justice Scalia asked how Romer could be reconciled with Davis v. Beason:

It remains to be explained how §501 of the Idaho Revised Statutes was not an "impermissible targeting" of polygamists, but (the much more mild) Amendment 2 is an "impermissible targeting" of homosexuals. Has the Court concluded that the perceived social harm of polygamy is a "legitimate concern of government," and the perceived social harm of homosexuality is not?
