= Poland Act =

Act of the US Congress enforcing anti-polygamy laws in Utah Territory

- Other short titles: Plural Marriage Prosecution Act of 1874
- Long title: An Act in relation to courts and judicial officers in the Territory of Utah.
- Nicknames: Anti-Bigamy Prosecution Act of 1874
- Enacted by: the 43rd United States Congress
- Effective: June 23, 1874

Citations
- Public law: Pub. L. 43–469
- Statutes at Large: 18 Stat. 253

Legislative history
- Introduced in the House as H.R. 3097 by Luke P. Poland (R–VT) on April 25, 1874; Committee consideration by House Judiciary, Senate Judiciary; Passed the House on June 2, 1874 (159-55); Passed the Senate on June 22, 1874 (26-23); Signed into law by President Ulysses S. Grant on June 23, 1874

The Poland Act (18 Stat. 253) of 1874 was an act of the US Congress that sought to facilitate prosecutions under the Morrill Anti-Bigamy Act by eliminating the control members of the Church of Jesus Christ of Latter-day Saints (LDS Church) exerted over the justice system of Utah Territory. Sponsored by US Representative Luke P. Poland of Vermont, the Act redefined the jurisdiction of Utah courts by giving U.S. district courts exclusive jurisdiction in Utah Territory over all civil and criminal cases. The Act also eliminated the territorial marshal and attorney and gave their duties to a U.S. Marshal and a U.S. Attorney. The Act also altered petit and grand jury empaneling rules to keep polygamists off juries. By removing Latter-day Saints from positions of authority in the Utah justice system, the Act was intended to allow for successful prosecutions of Mormon polygamists.

== Background ==
In 1862, US President Abraham Lincoln signed into law the anti-bigamy bill known as the Morrill Anti-Bigamy Act, but it was not rigorously enforced against Mormons in Utah Territory. The "legislation struck at both polygamy and Church power by prohibiting plural marriage in the territories, disincorporating the [...] Church, and restricting the Church's ownership of property to fifty thousand dollars." The Mormons, believing that the law unconstitutionally deprived them of their First Amendment right to practice their religion freely, chose to ignore the law.

In the following years, several bills aimed at strengthening the anti-bigamy laws failed to pass the US Congress. They included the Wade, Cragin, and Cullom Bills, which had their origin in the Utah Territory and were initiated by men who were bitterly opposed to the Mormon curia. The Wade Bill, initiated in 1866, would have destroyed local government if it had passed. Three years later the Cragin Bill was proposed, but within a few days, it was substituted by the Cullom Bill, which was more radical than the Wade and the Cragin Bills. Members of the church worked for the defeat of the bill, including women of the church, who held mass meetings throughout the territory in January 1870 in opposition to the bill.

Frank J. Cannon stated: "Brigham had no trouble in organizing at home a resistance to the Cullom bill, in which Gentiles, Godbeites, and orthodox Mormons stood side by side. The women of Utah made a special and particular protest. The fact that women in the state of Utah had the right to vote in 1870--one of only two places in the entire United States where women could vote at that time--gave the protests added weight and consideration. The influence of railroad and telegraph friends was also called upon to resist the bill. Whether more tangible means of persuasion were used cannot be affirmed though some of Brigham's allies and protectors of that day were no more above susceptibility to financial influence than Brigham was above using it. At any rate, the Cullom bill died of willful neglect, and the territory was free, for a time, from this direct and dangerous menace to its independence."

== Immediate effects ==
Under the Poland Act, jury lists were to be drawn by the district court clerk (then a non-Mormon) and the Probate Court judge (a Mormon) to give equal representation of members and nonmembers of the church on juries. Immediately, the US attorney tried to bring leading church officials to trial but experienced problems. Many of the leaders of the church had married before the law was passed in 1862 and could not be tried ex post facto. Furthermore, the wives could not be required to testify against their husbands, and the records of plural marriages were kept privately in the Endowment House.

After US Attorney William Carey promised to stop his attempts to indict general authorities during a test case to be brought before the US Supreme Court to determine the constitutionality of the anti-bigamy law, church leaders agreed to furnish a defendant. The First Presidency asked the 32-year-old George Reynolds, a secretary in the office of the President of the Church, who had recently married a second wife, to stand in for the church in the courts. Reynolds agreed to serve, provided the attorney numerous witnesses who could testify that he was married to two wives, and was indicted for bigamy by a grand jury on October 23, 1874. When Carey did not keep his promise and arrested George Q. Cannon, church leaders decided that they would no longer co-operate with him.

In 1875, Reynolds was convicted and sentenced to two years of hard labor in prison and a fine of five hundred dollars. In 1876, the Utah Territorial Supreme Court upheld the sentence. His 1878 Reynolds v. United States appeal reached the US Supreme Court, which in January 1879 ruled the anti-polygamy legislation to be constitutional and upheld Reynold's prison sentence (it struck down the fine and hard labor portions). Reynolds was released from prison in January 1881 and had served eighteen months of his original sentence.

== See also ==
- Utah War (1857–1858)
- Edmunds Act (1882)
- Edmunds-Tucker Act (1887)
- LDS Church v. United States (1890)
- 1890 Manifesto
- Smoot Hearings (1903–1907)
- Second Manifesto (1904)
- The Church of Jesus Christ of Latter-day Saints and politics in the United States
- Timeline of civil marriage in the United States
- Philip T. Van Zile – served as U.S. District Attorney for the Utah Territory 1878–1884 based on this act

== Sources ==
- Stephen Eliot Smith, "The 'Mormon Question' Revisited: Anti-polygamy Laws and the Free Exercise Clause" (2005) (LL.M. thesis, Harvard Law School).
