= Late Corp. of the Church of Jesus Christ of Latter-Day Saints v. United States =

The Late Corporation of the Church of Jesus Christ of Latter-Day Saints v. United States
- Supreme Court of the United States

Argued January 16–18, 1889 Decided May 19, 1890
- Full case name: The Late Corporation of the Church of Jesus Christ of Latter-Day Saints et al. v. United States; Romney et al. v. United States
- Citations: 136 U.S. 1 (more) 10 S. Ct. 792; 34 L. Ed. 478; 1890 U.S. LEXIS 2199

Case history
- Prior: Edmunds-Tucker Act provisions authorizing disincorporation of LDS Church upheld in U.S. v. Church of Jesus Christ of Latter-Day Saints. 5 Utah 361, 15 P. 473 (Utah.Terr. 1887). Appeal from the Supreme Court of the Utah Territory

Holding
- Congress has supreme authority over territories, including power to dissolve the LDS Church's corporation and seize its property. Under parens patriae principles, Congress may redirect assets to charitable purposes within Utah Territory. Property was properly not transferred to church members because they were using it to further the outlawed practice of polygamy.

Court membership
- Chief Justice Melville Fuller Associate Justices Samuel F. Miller · Stephen J. Field; Joseph P. Bradley · John M. Harlan; Horace Gray · Samuel Blatchford; Lucius Q. C. Lamar II · David J. Brewer

Case opinions
- Majority: Bradley, joined by Miller, Harlan, Gray, Blatchford, Brewer
- Dissent: Fuller, joined by Lamar, Field

Laws applied
- U.S. Const. amend. I; Edmunds-Tucker Act

The Late Corporation of the Church of Jesus Christ of Latter-Day Saints v. United States, 136 U.S. 1 (1890), was a Supreme Court case that upheld the Edmunds–Tucker Act on May 19, 1890. Among other things, the act disincorporated the Church of Jesus Christ of Latter-day Saints (LDS Church). The LDS Church was represented by its chief counsel Franklin S. Richards and former congressman James Broadhead.

== Decision ==
The ruling in Late Corporation would have directed federal escheat of substantially all the property of the legally disincorporated LDS Church, which was estimated at $3 million. Following the decision, the U.S. Attorney for The Utah Territory reported seizing only $381,812 in assets. Real property, including LDS temples, was never seized, although the ruling authorized it. Within five months, the LDS Church officially discontinued the practice of plural marriage with the 1890 Manifesto. On October 25, 1893, a congressional resolution authorized the release of assets seized from the LDS Church because, "said church has discontinued the practice of polygamy and no longer encourages or gives countenance to any manner of practices in violation of law, or contrary to good morals or public policy."

Chief Justice Fuller's dissent asserted that though Congress has the power to criminalize polygamy, "it is not authorized under the cover of that power to seize and confiscate the property of persons, individuals, or corporations, without office found, because they may have been guilty of criminal practices."

A few days later, the Supreme Court issued a decree written by Justice Bradley, 140 U.S. 665, that modified the holding of this case.

== Modifying decree and territory's response ==
The Utah Territory Supreme Court, in accordance with the Supreme Court's decision, appointed a special master to draft a plan for what to do with the LDS Church's possessions. The plan was to reallocate the property to charitable purposes in line as much as was practical with the donors' intent. As such, the master suggested using the property for public schools. Mormons objected to this. And a court ultimately decided on November 2, 1892 that the property would be put in a trust to be used by Mormons for either places of worship or relief for the poor.

Justice Zane of the Utah court differed from his colleagues because he believed the church's repudiation of polygamy as official church doctrine in 1890 entitled the church to receiving its property back.

== See also ==
- 1890 Manifesto
- Edmunds Act (1882)
- Edmunds-Tucker Act (1887)
- History of civil marriage in the U.S.
- List of United States Supreme Court cases, volume 136
- Morrill Anti-Bigamy Act (1862)
- Poland Act (1874)
- Reynolds v. United States (1879)
- Second Manifesto (1904)
- Smoot Hearings (1903–1907)
