= Gamofites =

Organization for gay Mormon fathers

- Founded: 1991; 35 years ago
- Dissolved: 2012; 14 years ago
- Purpose: "Fostering and supporting the needs and individual growth of members in an environment of confidentiality, trust, and unconditional love."
- Owner: Affirmation: Gay & Lesbian Mormons
- Website: www.gamofites.org

Gamofites was a support organization of Latter-day Saint gay fathers founded in 1991 and operated under Affirmation. Because Mormonism contains many "ites"—Nephites, Lamanites, Jaredites, etc.—the group shortened Gay Mormon Fathers to Ga-mo-fites. Membership in Gamofites was open to any gay father of Mormon background and their partner.

Some Gamofites were married and still coming to terms with being gay, while others had been living openly as gay men for many years. The organization had built a network of social, spiritual, and emotional support for its members.

The main function of Gamofites was to support gay Mormon fathers with love and understanding. This was done through an informal network of friendships (often on the Internet) and through formal weekend retreats with each region holding semiannual retreats. In its support for the sexuality of its members, Gamofites dissented from the Church of Jesus Christ of Latter-day Saints' official doctrine on homosexuality. At the time Gamofites was active in the early 2000s, members of the group and others like Reconciliation, Family Fellowship, and Affirmation, faced a choice of celibacy, reparative therapy or excommunication.

In addition, the organization published a newsletter, Gamofite News; prepared position papers on homosexuality, fatherhood, gay-straight relationships, and Christian teachings for people grappling with these issues; and publicized and promoted Gamofite activities. The organization appeared to have closed in 2012 by being absorbed into its parent organization Affirmation.

== See also ==
- Affirmation: LGBT Mormons, Families & Friends
- Criticism of the Church of Jesus Christ of Latter-day Saints
- Ex-Mormon
- Homosexuality and The Church of Jesus Christ of Latter-day Saints
- LGBT parenting
- LGBT-affirming religious groups
