= Morrill Anti-Bigamy Act =

1862 federal enactment of the US Congress

- Long title: An Act to punish and prevent the Practice of Polygamy in the Territories of the United States and other Places, and disapproving and annulling certain Acts of the Legislative Assembly of the Territory of Utah.
- Nicknames: Morrill Anti-Bigamy Act of 1862
- Enacted by: the 37th United States Congress
- Effective: July 1, 1862

Citations
- Public law: Pub. L. 37–126
- Statutes at Large: 12 Stat. 501

Legislative history
- Introduced in the House as H.R. 391 by Justin Smith Morrill (R–VT) on April 9, 1862; Committee consideration by House Judiciary, Senate Judiciary; Passed the House on April 28, 1862 (119-28); Passed the Senate on June 3, 1862 (37-2) with amendment; House agreed to Senate amendment on June 24, 1862 (Passed Voice Vote); Signed into law by President Abraham Lincoln on July 1, 1862

The Morrill Anti-Bigamy Act (37th United States Congress, Sess. 2., ch. 126, 12 Stat. 501) was a federal enactment of the United States Congress that was signed into law on July 1, 1862, by President Abraham Lincoln. Sponsored by Justin Smith Morrill of Vermont, the act banned bigamy in federal territories such as Utah and limited church and non-profit ownership in any territory of the United States to $50,000.

The act targeted the Mormon practice of plural marriage and the property dominance of the Church of Jesus Christ of Latter-day Saints (LDS Church) in the Utah Territory. The measure had no funds allocated for enforcement, and Lincoln chose not to enforce this law; instead Lincoln gave Brigham Young tacit permission to ignore the Morrill Act in exchange for not becoming involved with the Civil War. General Patrick Edward Connor, commanding officer of the federal forces garrisoned at Fort Douglas, Utah beginning in 1862, was explicitly instructed not to confront the Mormons over this or any other issue.

The Morrill Anti-Bigamy Act was amended in 1882 by the Edmunds Act, and then again in 1887 by the Edmunds–Tucker Act.

== Enforcement ==
Enforcement of these acts started in July 1887. The issue went to the Supreme Court in the case Late Corp. of the Church of Jesus Christ of Latter-Day Saints v. United States that upheld the Edmunds–Tucker Act on May 19, 1890. Among other things, the act disincorporated the LDS Church. Within five months, the LDS Church officially discontinued the practice of plural marriage with the 1890 Manifesto. On October 25, 1893, a congressional resolution authorized the release of assets seized from the LDS Church because, "said church has discontinued the practice of polygamy and no longer encourages or gives countenance to any manner of practices in violation of law, or contrary to good morals or public policy."

== Effect ==
The enforcement of the acts led to prosecution of many Latter-day Saints in Utah Territory. Following the passage of the Edmunds Act, bigamy or plural marriage was a crime punishable by 6 months in prison and a fine of $300. Many Latter-day Saints engaged in plural marriage were forced into hiding to avoid prosecution.

In 1890, the Church of Jesus Christ of Latter-day Saints issued a statement known as the 1890 Manifesto. The Manifesto declared that the Church would no longer teach the practice of plural marriage, and that no members would be allowed to enter into new plural marriages.

== See also ==
- Mormon War (1838) (1838 Missouri)
- Illinois Mormon War (1844–1845)
- Mormon Exodus (1846–1857)
- Utah War (1857–1858)
- Poland Act (1874)
- Reynolds v. United States (1879)
- LDS Church v. United States (1890)
- 1890 Manifesto
- Smoot Hearings (1903–1907)
- Second Manifesto (1904)
- Timeline of civil marriage in the United States
- Justin Smith Morrill
- George Reynolds
- The Church of Jesus Christ of Latter-day Saints and politics in the United States
