= Edmunds–Tucker Act =

Act of Congress

- Other short titles: Anti-Plural Marriage Act of 1887
- Long title: An Act to amend an act entitled "An act to amend section fifty-three hundred and fifty-two of the Revised Statutes of the United States, in reference to bigamy, and for other purposes," approved March twenty-second, eighteen hundred and eighty-two.
- Nicknames: Anti-Polygamy Act of 1887
- Enacted by: the 49th United States Congress
- Effective: March 3, 1887 - November 2, 1978

Citations
- Public law: 49-397
- Statutes at Large: 24 Stat. 635

Codification
- Titles amended: 48 U.S.C.: Territories and Insular Possessions
- U.S.C. sections created: 48 U.S.C. ch. 10 § 1480

Legislative history
- Introduced in the Senate as S. 10 by George F. Edmunds (R–VT) on December 8, 1885; Committee consideration by Senate Judiciary, House Judiciary; Passed the Senate on January 8, 1886 (38-7); Passed the House on January 17, 1887 (Passed); Reported by the joint conference committee on February 16, 1887; agreed to by the House on February 17, 1887 (203-40) and by the Senate on February 18, 1887 (37-13); Left unsigned by President Grover Cleveland and became law on March 3, 1887

The Edmunds–Tucker Act of 1887 was an Act of Congress that restricted some practices of the Church of Jesus Christ of Latter-day Saints (LDS Church) and disincorporated the LDS Church. An amendment to the earlier Edmunds Act, it was passed in response to the dispute between the United States Congress and the LDS Church regarding polygamy. The act was found at 48 U.S.C. § 1480, with the full text of the law published at 24 Stat. 635. In 1978, the act was repealed by Public Law 95-584, the full text of which was published at 92 Stat. 2483.

The act was named after its congressional sponsors, Senator George F. Edmunds of Vermont and Representative John Randolph Tucker of Virginia.

== Legislative history ==
In President Grover Cleveland's annual address to Congress in December 1885, he emotionally discussed the issue of polygamy in Utah:

The strength, the perpetuity, and the destiny of the nation rest upon our homes, established by the law of God, guarded by parental care, regulated by parental authority, and sanctified by parental love.

These are not the homes of polygamy. . . .

There is no feature of this practice or the system which sanctions it which is not opposed to all that is of value in our institutions.

There should be no relaxation in the firm but just execution of the law now in operation, and I should be glad to approve such further discreet legislation as will rid the country of this blot upon its fair fame.

Since the people upholding polygamy in our Territories are reenforced by immigration from other lands, I recommend that a law be passed to prevent the importation of Mormons into the country.

The Act was passed by the Senate in January 1886 by a vote of 38–7. It was passed by the House via a voice vote in January 1887. President Cleveland refused to sign the bill but did not veto it, which meant that the Act became law on March 3, 1887.

== Provisions ==
The act disincorporated both the LDS Church and the Perpetual Emigration Fund on the grounds that they fostered polygamy. The act prohibited the practice of polygamy and punished it with a fine of from $500 to $800 and imprisonment of up to five years. It dissolved the corporation of the church and directed the confiscation by the federal government of all church properties valued over a limit of $50,000. The act was enforced by the U.S. Marshal and a host of deputies.

The act:

- Disincorporated the LDS Church and the Perpetual Emigrating Fund Company, with assets to be used for public schools in the Territory.
- Required an anti-polygamy oath for prospective voters, jurors and public officials.
- Annulled territorial laws allowing illegitimate children to inherit.
- Required civil marriage licenses (to aid in the prosecution of polygamy).
- Abrogated the common law spousal privilege for polygamists, thus requiring wives to testify against their husbands.
- Disenfranchised women (who had been enfranchised by the Territorial legislature in 1870).
- Replaced local judges (including the previously powerful Probate Court judges) with federally appointed judges.
- Abolished the office of Territorial superintendent of district schools, granting the supreme court of the Territory of Utah the right to appoint a commissioner of schools. Also called for the prohibition of the use of sectarian books and for the collection of statistics of the number of so-called gentiles and Mormons attending and teaching in the schools.

(See text of the act scanned from the U.S. Statutes at large, linked elsewhere on this page.)

In 1890 the U.S. Supreme Court upheld the seizure of Church property under the Edmunds–Tucker Act in Late Corp. of the Church of Jesus Christ of Latter-Day Saints v. United States.

This act was repealed in 1978.

== Edmunds–Tucker Act sponsors ==
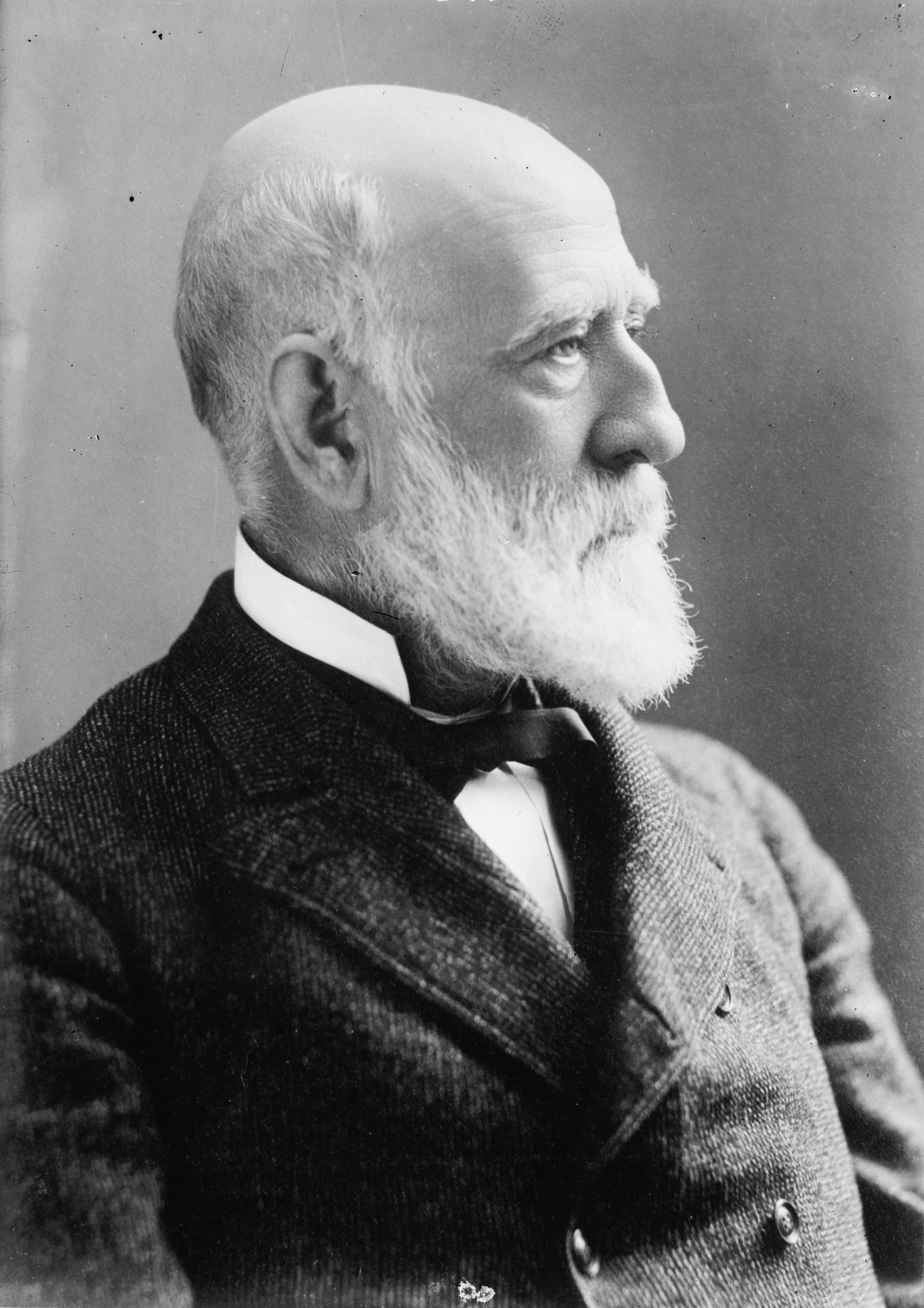
Sen. George F. Edmunds (R—VT)

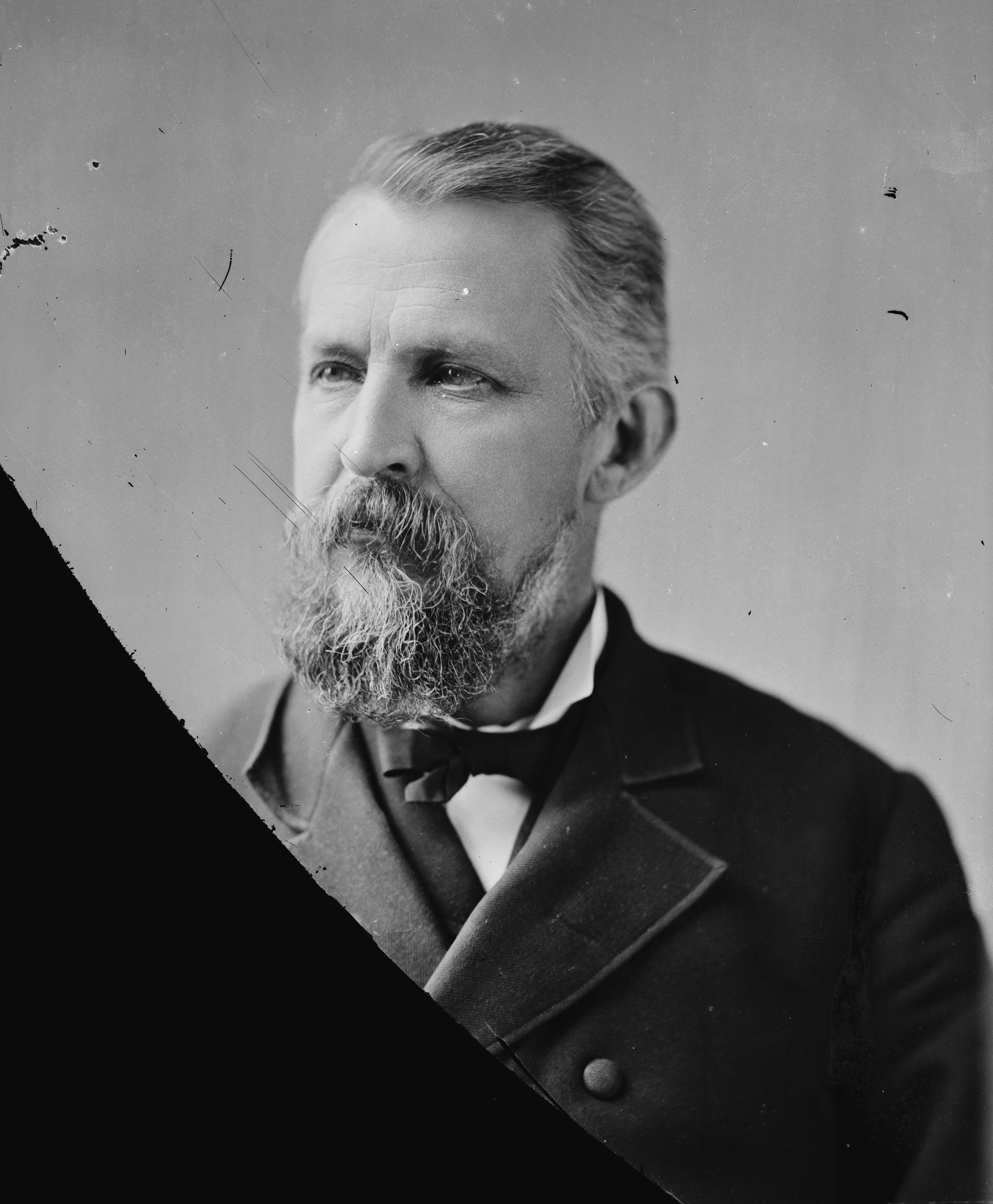
Rep. John Randolph Tucker (D—VA-10)

Edmunds-Tucker Act

Anti-Polygamy Act of 1887

== See also ==
- 1890 Manifesto
- The Church of Jesus Christ of Latter-day Saints and politics in the United States
- Edmunds Act (1882)
- Timeline of civil marriage in the United States
- LDS Church v. United States (1890)
- Morrill Anti-Bigamy Act (1862)
- Poland Act (1874)
- Reynolds v. United States (1879)
- Second Manifesto (1904)
- Smoot Hearings (1903–1907)
- Utah War (1857–1858)
- Women's suffrage in Utah
