= Reynolds v. United States =

- Supreme Court of the United States

Argued November 14–15, 1878 Decided January 6, 1879
- Full case name: George Reynolds v. United States
- Citations: 98 U.S. 145 (more) 25 L. Ed. 244; 1878 U.S. LEXIS 1374; 8 Otto 145

Case history
- Prior: Defendant convicted, District Court for the 3rd Judicial District of the Territory of Utah; conviction upheld by Utah Territorial Supreme Court

Holding
- The Free Exercise Clause of the First Amendment protects the right to hold any religious belief, but not the right to engage in any religious activity whatsoever. Supreme Court of Utah affirmed.

Court membership
- Chief Justice Morrison Waite Associate Justices Nathan Clifford · Noah H. Swayne; Samuel F. Miller · Stephen J. Field; William Strong · Joseph P. Bradley; Ward Hunt · John M. Harlan

Case opinions
- Majority: Waite, joined by Clifford, Swayne, Miller, Strong, Bradley, Hunt, Harlan
- Concur/dissent: Field

Laws applied
- Sect. 5352 of the Revised Statutes

Reynolds v. United States, 98 U.S. 145 (1878), was a Supreme Court of the United States case which held that religious duty was not a defense to a criminal indictment. Reynolds was the first Supreme Court opinion to address the First Amendment's protection of religious liberties, impartial juries and the Confrontation Clauses of the Sixth Amendment.

George Reynolds was a member of the Church of Jesus Christ of Latter-day Saints (LDS Church), charged with bigamy under the Morrill Anti-Bigamy Act after marrying Amelia Jane Schofield while still married to Mary Ann Tuddenham in Utah Territory. He was secretary to Brigham Young and presented himself as a test of the federal government's attempt to outlaw polygamy. An earlier conviction was overturned on technical grounds.

== Background ==
The LDS Church, believing that the law unconstitutionally deprived its members of their First Amendment right to freely practice their religion, chose to challenge the Morrill Anti-Bigamy Act. The First Presidency decided to furnish a defendant to establish a test case to be brought before the United States Supreme Court, to determine the constitutionality of the anti-bigamy law. Reynolds, a secretary in the office of the president of the church, agreed to serve as the defendant. He provided the United States Attorney with numerous witnesses who could testify of his being married to two wives, and was indicted for bigamy by a grand jury on June 23, 1874. In 1875, Reynolds was convicted and sentenced to two years in prison at hard labor (a provision not included in the statute) and a fine of five hundred dollars. In 1876 the Utah Territorial Supreme Court upheld the sentence.

Previously, U.S. Attorney William Carey promised to stop his attempts to indict general authorities during the test case. However, when Carey failed to keep his promise and arrested George Q. Cannon, LDS Church leaders decided that they would no longer cooperate with him.

The Supreme Court had dealt with religious liberty in only a handful of earlier cases, such as Vidal v. Girard's Executors, Permoli v. New Orleans, and Watson v. Jones. In Watson, the justice writing for the court observed in dicta that the protection of religious liberty was not absolute because people were not entitled to "violate the laws of morality and property" or to "infringe personal rights."

== Prior history ==
Reynolds was indicted in the District Court for the 3rd Judicial District of the Territory of Utah under sect. 5352 of the Revised Statutes of the United States, which stated, as quoted in the Supreme Court decision:

Every person having a husband or wife living, who marries another, whether married or single, in a Territory, or other place over which the United States have exclusive jurisdiction, is guilty of bigamy, and shall be punished by a fine of not more than $500, and by imprisonment for a term of not more than five years.

Reynolds tried to have the jury instructed that if they found he committed bigamy with the only intention of following his religion, then he must be acquitted. The trial court refused this request and instructed the jury that if they found that Reynolds, under religious influence, "deliberately married a second time, having a first wife living, the want of consciousness of evil intent—the want of understanding on his part that he was committing crime—did not excuse him, but the law inexorably, in such cases, implies criminal intent."

After being found guilty by the lower court, Reynolds appealed to the Utah Territorial Supreme Court, which upheld the conviction.

== Decision ==
Reynolds's attorneys, George W. Biddle and Ben Sheeks, appealed the Utah Territorial Supreme Court decision to the U.S. Supreme Court, consisting of Chief Justice Morrison Remick Waite, and Associate Justices Joseph P. Bradley, Nathan Clifford, Stephen Johnson Field, John Marshall Harlan, Ward Hunt, Samuel Freeman Miller, William Strong, and Noah Haynes Swayne.

The Supreme Court heard arguments in the case on 14 November 1878. Reynolds' attorneys argued that his conviction for bigamy should be overturned on four issues: (1) that it was his religious duty to marry multiple times, the practice of which the First Amendment protected as a fundamental duty of his religion; (2) that his grand jury had not been legally constituted; (3) that challenges of certain jurors were improperly overruled; and (4) that testimony was not admissible as it was under another indictment.

On 6 January 1879, the Court issued its unanimous decision affirming Reynolds's conviction and rejecting Reynolds's argument that the Latter-day Saint practice of plural marriage was protected by the Free Exercise Clause of the First Amendment to the Constitution. Thus, his conviction was upheld, as was the constitutionality of the Morrill Anti-Bigamy Act. Chief Justice Morrison Waite wrote on behalf of himself and seven colleagues. Justice Field wrote a separate opinion that dissented on one minor point.

At a subsequent day of the term, on a petition for rehearing, it was pointed out that Reynolds' sentence to "hard labor" was not a part of the statute. Chief Justice Waite delivered the opinion of the court to vacate the sentence of the lower court.

"Since our judgment in this case was announced, a petition for rehearing has been filed, in which our attention is called to the fact that the sentence of the [98 U.S. 145, 169] court below requires the imprisonment to be at hard labor, when the act of Congress under which the indictment was found provides for punishment by imprisonment only. This was not assigned for error on the former hearing, and we might on that account decline to consider it now; but as the irregularity is one which appears on the face of the record, we vacate our former judgment of affirmance, and reverse the judgment of the court below for the purpose of correcting the only error which appears in the record, to wit, in the form of the sentence. The cause is remanded, with instructions to cause the sentence of the District Court to be set aside and a new one entered on the verdict in all respects like that before imposed, except so far as it requires the imprisonment to be at hard labor."

=== Religious duty argument ===
The Court considered whether Reynolds could use religious belief or duty as a defense. Reynolds had argued that as a Mormon, it was his religious duty as a male member of the church to practice polygamy if possible.

The Court recognized that under the First Amendment, the Congress cannot pass a law that prohibits the free exercise of religion. But it held that the law prohibiting bigamy did not meet that standard. The principle that a person could only be married singly, not plurally, existed since the times of King James I of England in English law, upon which United States law was based.

This was the Supreme Court's first run-in with a critical case concerning the Free Exercise of Religion Clause in the First Amendment. The Court unanimously decided that polygamous activity would not be tolerated, even under the protection of Free Practice of Religion in the First Amendment.

The Court investigated the history of religious freedom in the United States and quoted a letter from Thomas Jefferson in which he wrote that there was a distinction between religious belief and action that flowed from religious belief. The former "lies solely between man and his God," therefore "the legislative powers of the government reach actions only, and not opinions."

The Court upheld the criminalization of polygamy on the reasoning that polygamy was “odious among the northern and western nations of Europe, and, until the establishment of the Mormon Church, almost exclusively a feature of the life of Asiatic and of African people.” As such [polygamy] “fetters the people in stationary despotism.” Following this reasoning the Court considered that if polygamy was allowed, someone might eventually argue that human sacrifice or suttee is a necessary part of their religion, and "to permit this would be to make the professed doctrines of religious belief superior to the law of the land, and in effect to permit every citizen to become a law unto himself. Government could exist only in name under such circumstances." The Court ruled the First Amendment forbade Congress from legislating against opinion, but allowed it to legislate against action.

=== Other arguments ===
Reynolds argued that the grand jury that had indicted him was not legal. United States law at that time required that a grand jury consist of no fewer than 16 persons. The grand jury that indicted Reynolds had only 15 persons. The court rejected this argument because the Utah Territory had passed a law in 1870 under which a grand jury had to consist of only 15 persons.

During his original trial, Reynolds had challenged two jurors, both of whom stated that they had formed an opinion on the guilt or innocence of Reynolds before the trial. The court held that universal education and press reports made it hard to find jurors who had not formed some opinion. It found that Reynolds had failed to meet the requirement that he, as challenger of a juror's objectivity, demonstrate that a juror had developed a real and strong opinion. The prosecution had discharged two potential jurors who refused to say whether or not they were living in polygamy. The Court held that it would not overturn a case based on the legality of challenges to dismissed jurors.

The Court held that evidence Amelia Jane Schofield, Reynold's second wife, gave during an earlier trial of Reynolds for the same offense but under a different indictment was admissible. Schofield could not be found during the second trial and so evidence from the previous trial was used. The Court held that "if a witness is kept away by the adverse party, his testimony, taken on a former trial between the same parties upon the same issues, may be given in evidence". The court held that Reynolds had every opportunity under oath to reveal the whereabouts of Schofield. This was the one point on which Justice Field dissented, finding that the evidence should not have been allowed.

Reynolds had argued that the jury had been improperly instructed by the judge when he told them that they "should consider what are to be the consequences to the innocent victims of this delusion". Reynolds argued that this introduced prejudice to the jury. The Court held that Reynolds had freely admitted that he was a bigamist. All the judge had done was "call the attention of the jury to the peculiar character of the crime" and had done so "not to make them partial, but to keep them impartial".

== Reaction ==
George Q. Cannon, representative of the territory, wrote in response to this decision:

Our crime has been: We married women instead of seducing them; we reared children instead of destroying them; we desired to exclude from the land prostitution, bastardy and infanticide. If George Reynolds [the man who was convicted of committing bigamy] is to be punished, let the world know the facts.... Let it be published to the four corners of the earth that in this land of liberty, the most blessed and glorious upon which the sun shines, the law is swiftly invoked to punish religion, but justice goes limping and blindfolded in pursuit of crime.

The New York Times defended the decision, noting that the 1862 act that banned bigamy, though "obviously directed at the polygamous practices of the Mormons, merely extended over the Territories the common law in relation to bigamy which exists in every State of the Union." Its editorial ridiculed the Mormon defense of polygamy as a religious practice and said: "Similarly, a sect which should pretend, or believe, that incest, infanticide, or murder was a divinely appointed ordinance, to be observed under certain conditions, could set up that the enforcement of the common law, as against either [sic] of these practices, was an invasion of the rights of conscience."

== Wall of separation between church and state ==
The aforementioned letter from Thomas Jefferson was an 1802 letter to the Danbury Baptists. They were a religious minority who were concerned about the dominant position of the Congregational church in Connecticut and who voiced their concerns in a letter dated October 7, 1801, to the newly elected President Thomas Jefferson against a government establishment of religion. Jefferson wrote in return to the Baptists that the United States Bill of Rights prevents the establishment of a national church, and so they did not have to fear government interference in their right to expressions of religious conscience:

Believing with you that religion is a matter which lies solely between Man & his God, that he owes account to none other for his faith or his worship, that the legitimate powers of government reach actions only, and not opinions, I contemplate with sovereign reverence that act of the whole American people which declared that their legislature should "make no law respecting an establishment of religion, or prohibiting the free exercise thereof", thus building a wall of separation between Church & State. Adhering to this expression of the supreme will of the nation in behalf of the rights of conscience, I shall see with sincere satisfaction the progress of those sentiments which tend to restore to man all his natural rights, convinced he has no natural right in opposition to his social duties.

Waite consulted American historian George Bancroft concerning the Reynolds case and the views on establishment by the framers of the U.S. constitution. Bancroft advised Waite to consult Jefferson. According to historian Don Drakeman, Waite then discovered the above quoted letter, with Jefferson's metaphor concerning the wall of separation between Church and State, in a library after skimming through an index to Jefferson’s collected works.

== See also ==
- Poland Act (1874)
- Edmunds Act (1882)
- Edmunds-Tucker Act (1887)
- LDS Church v. United States (1890)
- 1890 Manifesto
- Smoot Hearings (1903–1907)
- History of civil marriage in the U.S.
