= Edmunds Act =

US federal law

- Other short titles: Anti-Plural Marriage Act of 1882
- Long title: An Act to amend section fifty-three hundred and fifty-two of the Revised Statutes of the United States, in reference to bigamy, and for other purposes.
- Nicknames: Anti-Polygamy Act of 1882
- Enacted by: the 47th United States Congress
- Effective: March 22, 1882

Citations
- Public law: 47-47
- Statutes at Large: 22 Stat. 30b

Legislative history
- Introduced in the Senate as S. 353 by George F. Edmunds (R–VT) on December 12, 1881; Committee consideration by Senate Judiciary, House Judiciary; Passed the Senate on February 16, 1882 (26-24); Passed the House on March 13, 1882 (199-42); Signed into law by President Chester A. Arthur on March 22, 1882

The Edmunds Act, also known as the Edmunds Anti-Polygamy Act of 1882, is a United States federal statute, signed into law on March 23, 1882 by President Chester A. Arthur, declaring polygamy a felony in federal territories, punishable by "a fine of not more than five hundred dollars and by imprisonment for a term of not more than five years". The act is named for U.S. Senator George F. Edmunds of Vermont. The Edmunds Act also prohibited "bigamous" or "unlawful cohabitation" (a misdemeanor), thus removing the need to prove that actual marriages had occurred. The act not only reinforced the 1862 Morrill Anti-Bigamy Act but also made the offense of unlawful cohabitation much easier to prove than polygamy misdemeanor and made it illegal for polygamists or cohabitants to vote, hold public office, or serve on juries in federal territories.

A claim was made that the law violated the constitutional prohibition on ex post facto laws; that is, polygamists were charged for polygamist marriages solemnized before the passage of the statute. A challenge to the statute was framed on these and other grounds. The U.S. Supreme Court ruled, in Murphy v. Ramsey, 114 U.S. 15 (1885), that the statute was not ex post facto because convicts were charged for their continued cohabitation, not for the prior illegal marriage. Some modern scholars suggest the law may be unconstitutional for violating the Free Exercise Clause.

The Edmunds Act restrictions were enforced regardless of whether an individual was actually practicing polygamy, or merely stated a belief in the doctrine of the Church of Jesus Christ of Latter-day Saints (LDS Church) on plural marriage without actually participating. It also provided for a five-man Utah Commission appointed by the president to supervise all aspects of the electoral process in Utah Territory. All elected offices throughout the territory were vacated; the election board issued certificates to candidates who both denied a belief in polygamy and did not practice it; and new elections were held.

Efforts to enforce the act were stepped up with the subsequent Edmunds–Tucker Act of 1887, which disincorporated the LDS Church, disenfranchised women in Utah, and required voters to take an oath that they would obey the earlier Edmunds Act. After the Supreme Court again upheld the legislation in Late Corp. of the Church of Jesus Christ of Latter-Day Saints v. United States, the LDS Church officially discontinued the practice of plural marriage with an 1890 Manifesto issued by church president Wilford Woodruff. On October 25, 1893, a congressional resolution authorized the release of assets seized from the LDS Church because, "said the church has discontinued the practice of polygamy and no longer encourages or gives countenance to any manner of practices in violation of law, or contrary to good morals or public policy."

While the focus was primarily on polygamy in Utah, the applicability of the law throughout the territories meant it could also be used against LDS communities in Idaho and Arizona. And even where polygamy was not a significant practice, the provisions against unlawful cohabitation resulted in numerous prosecutions under the act in New Mexico Territory.

== Convictions ==
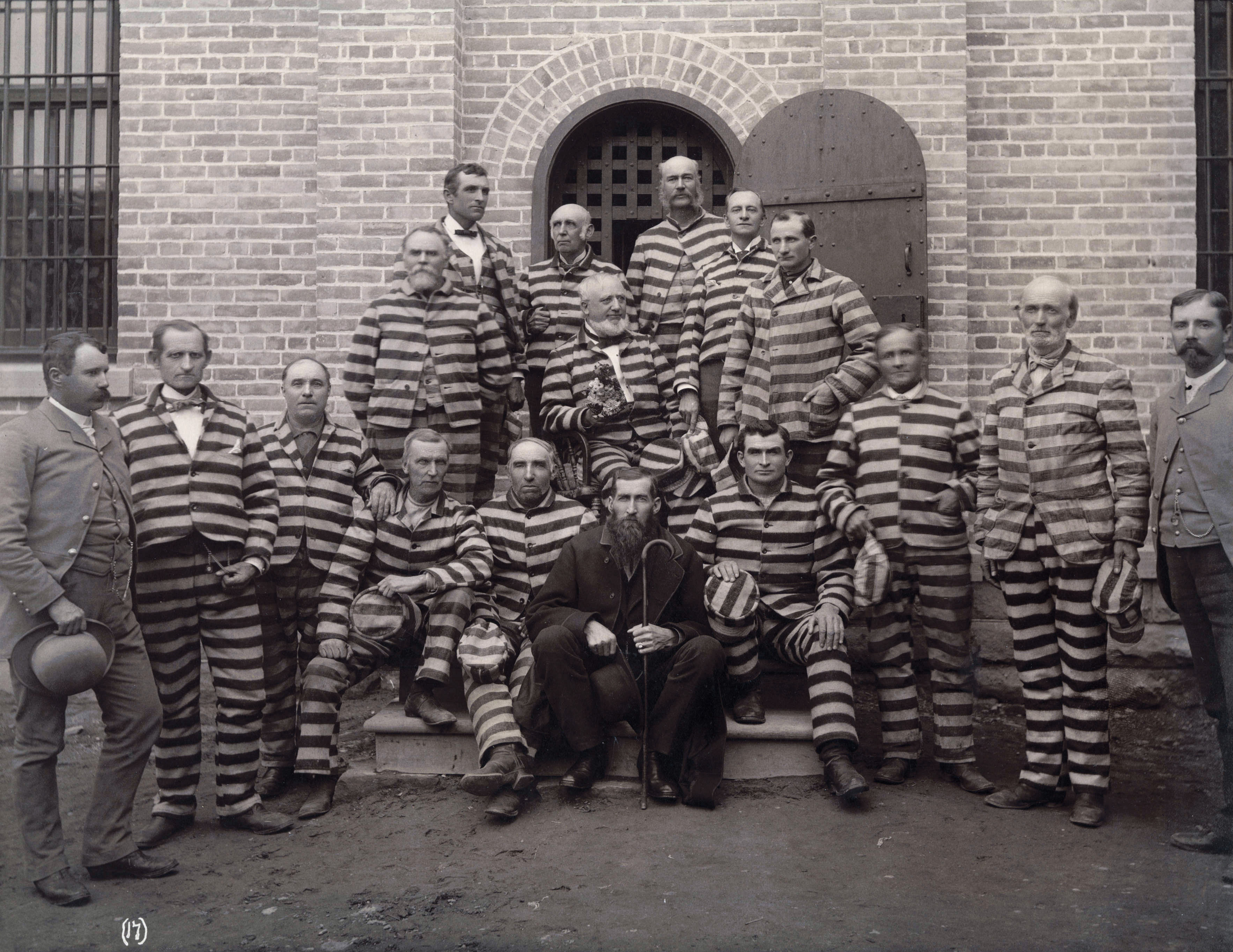
Portrait of polygamists in prison, at the Utah Penitentiary, including George Q. Cannon in 1889, arrested under the Edmunds Act.

More than 1,300 men were imprisoned under the terms of the Edmunds Act. It appears that women were not prosecuted, being seen as victims of the practice and not willing participants, although a number refused to testify against their husbands and some were jailed for their refusal.

- Rudger Clawson — August 1882 — a member of the Quorum of the Twelve Apostles who was the first person convicted. He was pardoned by President Grover Cleveland mere months before his sentence was to expire.
- William J. Flake — 1883 — one of the founders of Snowflake, Arizona, who married his second wife in 1868. Was imprisoned in the Yuma Territorial Prison in 1883. After his release, when asked which of his wives he was going to give up, he replied, "Neither. I married both in good faith and intended to support both of them." As he had already served his sentence, he could not be retried on the same charges.
- Angus M. Cannon — 1885 — a stake president, member of the Council of Fifty, and younger brother of apostle George Q. Cannon. Cannon was sentenced to six months imprisonment and a $900 fine. Cannon was the appellant in the case of Cannon v. United States, which was decided by the Supreme Court in 1885. Cannon's appeal was because he had immediately ceased having sexual relations with the two wives he was accused of cohabiting with after polygamy was criminalized. The Court rejected Cannon's argument, holding that "[c]ompacts for sexual non-intercourse, easily made and easily broken, when the prior marriage relations continue to exist, with the occupation of the same house and table and the keeping up of the same family unity, is not a lawful substitute for the monogamous family which alone the statute tolerates."
- John Sharp — 1885 — a bishop, member of the Council of Fifty, territorial chairman of the People's Party, director for the Union Pacific Railroad, Zion's Cooperative Mercantile Institution, Deseret Telegraph, and Deseret National Bank. Sharp initially pled not guilty, but withdrew his plea and pled guilty to the charge. He was fined $300 and court costs. As a result of pleading guilty, rather than plead not guilty as other LDS Church leaders had done, Sharp was asked by the stake high council and the First Presidency to resign as bishop of the Salt Lake Twentieth Ward, which he did on 3 November 1885. The New York Times criticized the church's removal of Sharp and suggested that it "reveals again the stubborn character of the Mormons' opposition to the law".
- Lorenzo Snow — 1885 — a church apostle at the time. In late 1885, Snow was indicted by a federal grand jury for three counts of unlawful cohabitation. According to his indictments, Snow had lived with more than one woman for three years. The jury delivered one indictment for each of these years, and Snow was convicted on each count. After conviction, he filed a petition for writ of habeas corpus in the federal district court which convicted him. The petition was denied, but federal law guaranteed him an appeal to the Supreme Court. In Ex Parte Snow, the Supreme Court invalidated Snow's second and third convictions for unlawful cohabitation. It found that unlawful cohabitation was a "continuing offense," and thus that Snow was at most guilty of one such offense for cohabiting continuously with more than one woman for three years. Snow became president of the LDS Church in 1898.
- Abraham H. Cannon — 1886 — a member of the First Council of the Seventy and son of apostle George Q. Cannon. Cannon was convicted of unlawful cohabitation in 1886 and sentenced to six months' imprisonment, which he served in full. In 1889 he became a church apostle.
- David John — 1887 — Provo stakeholder and Vice President of the Brigham Young University Board of Trustees. John married a second wife, Jane Cree, in 1865. He had nine children with Mary and 11 children with Jane. In 1887, he spent time in prison for violating the Edmunds Act.
- George Q. Cannon — 1888 — a church apostle and former non-voting delegate for the Utah Territory in the United States Congress, before the passage of the Edmunds Act. Cannon surrendered himself to authorities and pled guilty at trial to a charge of unlawful cohabitation. As a result, Cannon served nearly six months in Utah's federal penitentiary.
- Heber J. Grant — 1899 — a church apostle at the time. Grant pleaded guilty to unlawful cohabitation and paid a $100 fine. Grant became president of the LDS Church in 1918.
- Joseph F. Smith — 1906 — LDS Church president. Smith was brought to trial on a charge of unlawful cohabitation with four women in addition to his lawful wife; he pled guilty and was fined $300, the maximum penalty then permitted under the law.

== See also ==
- Utah War (1857–1858)
- Poland Act (1874)
- Reynolds v. United States (1879)
- Smoot Hearings (1903–1907)
- Second Manifesto (1904)
- History of civil marriage in the U.S.
- Cohabitation in the United States
- Zion's Central Board of Trade
