= Freedom of religion in the United States =

The Liberty of Worship monument in Washington, D.C.

In the United States, freedom of religion is a constitutionally protected right provided in the religion clauses of the First Amendment. The Bill of Rights supports freedom of religion as a legally-protected right, reading that, "Congress shall make no law respecting an establishment of religion, or prohibiting the free exercise thereof...". George Washington stressed freedom of religion as a fundamental American principle even before the First Amendment was ratified. In 1790, in a letter to the Touro Synagogue, Washington expressed the government "gives to bigotry no sanction" and "to persecution no assistance." Freedom of religion is linked to the principle of separation of church and state, a concept advocated by Colonial founders such as Dr. John Clarke, Roger Williams, William Penn, and later Founding Fathers, including James Madison and Thomas Jefferson.

The way freedom of religion is interpreted has changed over time in the United States and continues to be controversial. The issue was a major topic of George Washington's Farewell Address. Several American states had their own official state churches both before and after the First Amendment was passed and various Native American religions have been banned for most of US history. Illegal Native American religion was a major cause of the 1890–1891 Ghost Dance War. Starting in 1918, nearly all of the pacifist Hutterites emigrated to Canada when Joseph and Michael Hofer died following torture for conscientious objection to the draft. Some have since returned, but most Hutterites remain in Canada.

The long-term trend has been towards increasing secularization of the government. The remaining state churches were disestablished in 1820 and teacher-led public school prayer was abolished in 1962, but the military chaplaincy remains to the present day. Although most Supreme Court rulings have been accommodationist towards religion, in recent years there have been attempts to replace the freedom of religion with the more limited freedom of worship. Although the freedom of religion includes some form of recognition to the individual conscience of each citizen with the possibility of conscientious objection to law or policy, the freedom of worship does not.

Controversies surrounding the freedom of religion in the US have included building places of worship, compulsory speech, prohibited counseling, compulsory consumerism, workplace, marriage and the family, the choosing of religious leaders, circumcision of male infants, dress, education, oaths, praying for sick people, medical care, worshiping during quarantines, use of government lands sacred to Native Americans, the protection of graves, the bodily use of sacred substances, mass incarceration of innocent Japanese American clergy during World War II, both animal slaughter for meat and the use of living animals, and accommodations for employees, prisoners, and military personnel.

== Legal and public foundation ==
The United States Constitution addresses the issue of religion in two places: in the First Amendment, and the Article VI prohibition on religious tests as a condition for holding public office. The First Amendment prohibits the Congress from making a law "respecting an establishment of religion, or prohibiting the free exercise thereof". This provision was later expanded to state and local governments, through the incorporation of the First Amendment.

=== Colonial precedents ===
The October 10, 1645, charter of Flushing, Queens, New York, allowed "liberty of conscience, according to the custom and practice of Holland without molestation or disturbance from any magistrate or ecclesiastical minister." However, New Amsterdam Director-General Peter Stuyvesant issued an edict prohibiting the harboring of Quakers. On December 27, 1657, the inhabitants of Flushing approved a protest known as The Flushing Remonstrance. This contained religious arguments even mentioning freedom for "Jews, Turks, and Egyptians," but ended with a forceful declaration that any infringement of the town charter would not be tolerated.

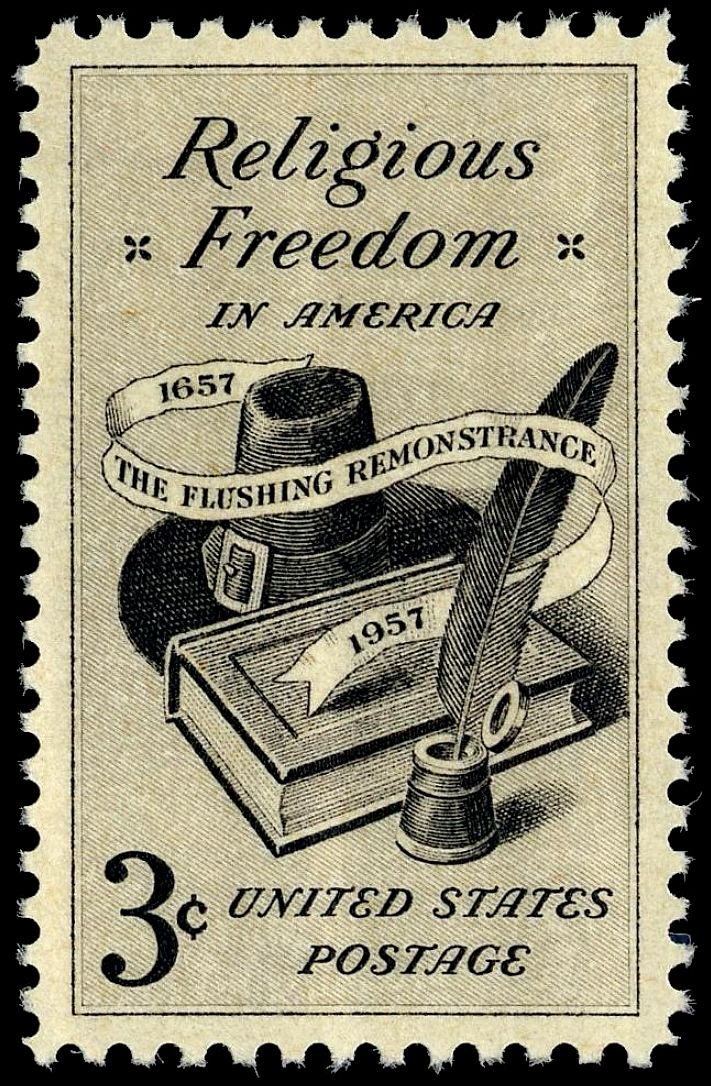
Religious Freedom postage stamp, commemorating the 300th anniversary of the Flushing Remonstrance, Issue of 1957

When England gained control of New Netherland in 1664, they chose to make no changes to the government principles in what is now New York, but established English Law. The coastal peninsula between the Hudson (North) and Delaware (South) Rivers was mostly unsettled and when colonists applied for permission to settle what is now New Jersey, Governor Nicolls issued a patent that guaranteed religious freedom in New Jersey. The language read, “…any and all persons, who shall plant and inhabit in any of the land aforesaid that they shall have free liberty of conscience, without any molestation or disturbance whatsoever in their way of worship.” Based on this patent, New Jersey is the only colony that had a non-denominational foundation and has guaranteed uninterrupted religious freedom until the present. By 1665 New Jersey had settlements that contained Anglicans, Baptists and Quakers (Friends) and at present has extreme religious diversity.

Freedom of religion was first applied as a principle in the founding of the colony of Maryland, also founded by the Catholic Lord Baltimore, in 1634. Fifteen years later (1649), an enactment of religious liberty, the Maryland Toleration Act, drafted by Lord Baltimore, provided: "No person or persons ... shall from henceforth be any waies troubled, molested or discountenanced for or in respect of his or her religion nor in the free exercise thereof." The Maryland Toleration Act was repealed with the assistance of Protestant assemblymen, and a new law barring Catholics from openly practicing their religion was passed. In 1657, Lord Baltimore regained control after making a deal with the colony's Protestants, and in 1658 the Act was again passed by the colonial assembly. This time, it would last more than thirty years, until 1692, when after Maryland's Protestant Revolution of 1689, freedom of religion was again rescinded. In addition in 1704, an Act was passed "to prevent the growth of Popery in this Province", preventing Catholics from holding political office. Full religious toleration was not restored in Maryland until the American Revolution, when Charles Carroll of Carrollton, a delegate of the Colony of Maryland to the Second Continental Congress in Philadelphia, signed the United States Declaration of Independence.

Rhode Island (1636), Connecticut (1636), and Pennsylvania (1682), founded by Baptist Roger Williams, Congregationalist Thomas Hooker, and Quaker William Penn, respectively, established the religious freedom in their colonies in direct opposition to the theocratic government which Separatist Congregationalists (Pilgrim Fathers) and Puritans had enforced in Plymouth Colony (1620) and Massachusetts Bay Colony (1628). Having fled religious persecution themselves in England, the leaders of Plymouth and Massachusetts Bay Colony restricted franchise to members of their church only, rigorously enforced their own interpretation of theological law and banished freethinkers such as Roger Williams, who was actually chased out of Salem., as well as banning Quakers and Anabaptists. These colonies became safe havens for persecuted religious minorities. Catholics and Jews also had full citizenship and free exercise of their faiths. Williams, Hooker, Penn, and their friends were firmly convinced that democracy and freedom of conscience were the will of God. Williams gave the most profound theological reason: As faith is the free gift of the Holy Spirit, it cannot be forced upon a person. Therefore, strict separation of church and state has to be kept. Pennsylvania was the only colony that retained unlimited religious freedom until the foundation of the United States. The inseparable connection of democracy, freedom of religion, and the other forms of freedom became the political and legal basis of the new nation. In particular, Baptists and Presbyterians demanded vigorously and successfully the disestablishment of the Anglican and Congregational state churches that had existed in most colonies since the seventeenth century.

=== The First Amendment ===
In the United States, the religious and civil liberties are guaranteed by the First Amendment to the United States Constitution:

Congress shall make no law respecting an establishment of religion, or prohibiting the free exercise thereof; or abridging the freedom of speech, or of the press; or the right of the people peaceably to assemble, and to petition the Government for a redress of grievances.

The "Establishment Clause", stating that "Congress shall make no law respecting an establishment of religion," is generally read to prohibit the Federal government from establishing a national church ("religion") or excessively involving itself in religion, particularly to the benefit of one religion over another. Following the ratification of the Fourteenth Amendment to the United States Constitution and through the doctrine of incorporation, this restriction is held to be applicable to state governments as well.

The "Free Exercise Clause" states that Congress cannot "prohibit the free exercise" of religious practices. The Supreme Court of the United States has consistently held, however, that the right to free exercise of religion is not absolute. For example, in the 19th century, some of the members of the Church of Jesus Christ of Latter-day Saints (LDS Church) traditionally practiced polygamy, yet in Reynolds v. United States (1879), the Supreme Court upheld the criminal conviction of one of these members under a federal law banning polygamy. The Court reasoned that to do otherwise would set precedent for a full range of religious beliefs including those as extreme as human sacrifice. The Court stated that "Laws are made for the government of actions, and while they cannot interfere with mere religious belief and opinions, they may with practices." For example, if one were part of a religion that believed in vampirism, the First Amendment would protect one's belief in vampirism, but not the practice.

=== The Fourteenth Amendment ===
The Fourteenth Amendment to the United States Constitution guarantees the religious civil rights. Whereas the First Amendment secures the free exercise of religion, section one of the Fourteenth Amendment prohibits discrimination, including on the basis of religion, by securing "the equal protection of the laws" for every person:

All persons born or naturalized in the United States, and subject to the jurisdiction there of, are citizens of the United States and of the State where in they reside. No state shall make or enforce any law which shall abridge the privileges or immunities of citizens of the United States; nor shall any State deprive any person of life, liberty, or property, without due process of law; nor deny to any person within its jurisdiction the equal protection of the laws.

This amendment was cited in Meyer v. Nebraska, striking down laws which banned education in the German language. These laws mainly affected church schools teaching in German. Some laws, such is in Montana, forbade preaching in German during church. A total ban on teaching German in both public and private schools was imposed for a time in at least fourteen states, including California, Indiana, Wisconsin, Ohio, Iowa and Nebraska. California's ban lasted into the mid-1920s, and German was banned again in California churches in 1941.

=== The "wall of separation" ===
Thomas Jefferson wrote that the First Amendment erected a "wall of separation between church and state" likely borrowing the language from Roger Williams, founder of the First Baptist Church in America and the Colony of Rhode Island, who used the phrase in his 1644 book, The Bloody Tenent of Persecution. James Madison, often regarded as the "Father of the Bill of Rights", also often wrote of the "perfect separation", "line of separation", "strongly guarded as is the separation between religion and government in the Constitution of the United States", and "total separation of the church from the state". Madison explicitly credited Martin Luther as the theorist who "led the way" in providing the proper distinction between the civil and the ecclesiastical spheres with his doctrine of the two kingdoms.

Controversy rages in the United States between those who wish to restrict government involvement with religious institutions and remove religious references from government institutions and property, and those who wish to loosen such prohibitions. Advocates for stronger separation of church and state, such as already exists in France with the practice of laїcité, emphasize the plurality of faiths and non-faiths in the country, and what they see as broad guarantees of the federal Constitution. Their opponents emphasize what they see as the largely Christian heritage and history of the nation (often citing the references to "Nature's God" and the "Creator" of men in the Declaration of Independence and the dating of the Constitution with the phrase "in the Year of our Lord"). While broad defenses of religious freedom were historically understood as ideologically liberal, in has been opined that in the 21st century they are understood as ideologically conservative. Some more socially conservative Christian sects, such as the Christian Reconstructionist movement, oppose the concept of a "wall of separation" and prefer a closer relationship between church and state.

Many current Supreme Court decisions regarding religious accommodations have been prioritizing the Free Exercise Clause over the Establishment clause, raising concerns about factors that are used to separate the church and state. The Supreme Court's shift to favor religion diminishes the value of doctrines that uphold the idea of "wall of separation" by reducing the viability of tolerance amongst devout citizens.

Problems also arise in U.S. public schools concerning the teaching and display of religious issues. In various counties, school choice and school vouchers have been put forward as solutions to accommodate variety in beliefs and freedom of religion, by allowing individual school boards to choose between a secular, religious or multi-faith vocation, and allowing parents free choice among these schools. Critics of American voucher programs claim that they take funds away from public schools, and that the amount of funds given by vouchers is not enough to help many middle and working-class parents.

U.S. judges often ordered alcoholic defendants to attend Alcoholics Anonymous or face imprisonment. However, in 1999, a federal appeals court ruled this unconstitutional because the A.A. program relies on submission to a "Higher Power".

Thomas Jefferson also played a large role in the formation of freedom of religion. He created the Virginia Statute for Religious Freedom, which has since been incorporated into the Virginia State Constitution.

=== Other statements ===
==== Inalienable rights ====
The United States of America was established on foundational principles by the Declaration of Independence:

We hold these truths to be self-evident: That all men are created equal; that they are endowed by their Creator with certain inalienable rights; that among these are life, liberty, and the pursuit of happiness; that, to secure these rights, governments are instituted among men, deriving their just powers from the consent of the governed; (based on Thomas Jefferson's draft.)

==== Religious institutions ====
In 1944, a joint committee of the Federal Council of Churches of Christ in America and the Foreign Missions Conference formulated a "Statement on Religious Liberty"

Religious Liberty shall be interpreted to include freedom to worship according to conscience and to bring up children in the faith of their parents; freedom for the individual to change his religion; freedom to preach, educate, publish and carry on missionary activities; and freedom to organize with others, and to acquire and hold property, for these purposes.

==== Freedom of religion restoration ====
Following increasing government involvement in religious matters, Congress passed the 1993 Religious Freedom Restoration Act. A number of states then passed corresponding acts (e.g., Missouri passed the Religious Freedom Restoration Act).

==== Treaty of Tripoli ====
Signed on November 4, 1796, the Treaty of Tripoli was a document that included the following statement:

As the Government of the United States of America is not, in any sense, founded on the Christian religion; as it has in itself no character of enmity against the laws, religion, or tranquility, of Mussulmen [Muslims]; and as the said States never entered into any war or act of hostility against any Mahometan [Mohammedan] nation, it is declared by the parties that no pretext arising from religious opinions shall ever produce an interruption of the harmony existing between the two countries.

This treaty was submitted to the Senate and was ratified unanimously on June 7, 1797, and then signed by President John Adams on June 10, 1797. In accordance with Article VI of the Constitution, on that date this treaty became incorporated as part of "the supreme Law of the Land".

== Supreme Court rulings ==
=== Jehovah's Witnesses ===
Since the 1940s, the Jehovah's Witnesses have often invoked the First Amendment's freedom of religion clauses to protect their ability to engage in the proselytizing (or preaching) that is central to their faith. This series of litigation has helped to define civil liberties case law in the United States and Canada.

In the United States of America and several other countries, the legal struggles of the Jehovah's Witnesses have yielded some of the most important judicial decisions regarding freedom of religion, press and speech. In the United States, many Supreme Court cases involving Jehovah's Witnesses are now landmark decisions of First Amendment law. Of the 72 cases involving the Jehovah's Witnesses that have been brought before the U.S. Supreme Court, the Court has ruled in favor of them 47 times. Even the cases that the Jehovah's Witnesses lost helped the U.S. to more clearly define the limits of First Amendment rights. Former Supreme Court Justice Harlan Stone jokingly suggested "The Jehovah's Witnesses ought to have an endowment in view of the aid which they give in solving the legal problems of civil liberties." "Like it or not," observed American author and editor Irving Dilliard, "Jehovah's Witnesses have done more to help preserve our freedoms than any other religious group."

Professor C. S. Braden wrote: "They have performed a signal service to democracy by their fight to preserve their civil rights, for in their struggle they have done much to secure those rights for every minority group in America."

"The cases that the Witnesses were involved in formed the bedrock of 1st Amendment protections for all citizens," said Paul Polidoro, a lawyer who argued the Watchtower Society's case before the Supreme Court in February 2002. "These cases were a good vehicle for the courts to address the protections that were to be accorded free speech, the free press and free exercise of religion. In addition, the cases marked the emergence of individual rights as an issue within the U.S. court system."

Before the Jehovah's Witnesses brought several dozen cases before the U.S. Supreme Court during the 1930s and 1940s, the Court had handled few cases contesting laws that restricted freedom of speech and freedom of religion. Until then, the First Amendment had only been applied to Congress and the federal government.

However, the cases brought before the Court by the Jehovah's Witnesses allowed the Court to consider a range of issues: mandatory flag salute, sedition, free speech, literature distribution and military draft law. These cases proved to be pivotal moments in the formation of constitutional law. Jehovah's Witnesses' court victories have strengthened rights including the protection of religious conduct from federal and state interference, the right to abstain from patriotic rituals and military service and the right to engage in public discourse.

During the World War II era, the U.S. Supreme Court ruled in favor of Jehovah's Witnesses in several landmark cases that helped pave the way for the modern civil rights movement. In all, Jehovah's Witnesses brought 23 separate First Amendment actions before the U.S. Supreme Court between 1938 and 1946.

=== Lemon test ===
For sixty years, the Supreme Court consistently held fast to the rule of strict separation of church and state when matters of prayer are involved. In Engel v. Vitale (1962) the Court ruled that government-imposed nondenominational prayer in public school was unconstitutional. In Lee v. Weisman (1992), the Court ruled prayer established by a school principal at a middle school graduation was also unconstitutional, and in Santa Fe Independent School Dist. v. Doe (2000) it ruled that school officials may not directly impose student-led prayer during high school football games nor establish an official student election process for the purpose of indirectly establishing such prayer. The distinction between force of government and individual liberty is the cornerstone of such cases. Each case restricts acts by government designed to establish prayer while explicitly or implicitly affirming students' individual freedom to pray.

The Court has therefore tried to determine a way to deal with church/state questions. In Lemon v. Kurtzman (1971), the Court created a three-part test for laws dealing with religious establishment. This determined that a law was constitutional if it:

1. Had a secular purpose
2. Neither advanced nor inhibited religion
3. Did not foster an excessive government entanglement with religion.

Some examples of where inhibiting religion has been struck down:

- In Widmar v. Vincent, 454 U.S. 263 (1981), the Court ruled that a Missouri law prohibiting religious groups from using state university grounds and buildings for religious worship was unconstitutional. As a result, Congress decided in 1984 that this should apply to secondary and primary schools as well, passing the Equal Access Act, which prevents public schools from discriminating against students based on "religious, political, philosophical or other content of the speech at such meetings". In Board of Education of Westside Community Schools v. Mergens, 496 U.S. 226, 236 (1990), the Court upheld this law when it ruled that a school board's refusal to allow a Christian Bible club to meet in a public high school classroom violated the act.
- In Good News Club v. Milford Central School, 533 U.S. 98 (2001), the Court ruled that religious groups must be allowed to use public schools after hours if the same access is granted to other community groups.
- In Rosenberger v. Rector and Visitors of the University of Virginia, 515 U.S. 819 (1995), the Supreme Court found that the University of Virginia was unconstitutionally withholding funds from a religious student magazine.

The Lemon Test was effectively overturned in the 2022 case of Kennedy v. Bremerton School District, which involved a Christian high school football coach at a public school that prayed in the middle of the field after every game, often joined by the players and attendees. The school district feared the display would be seen as them encouraging religion, and attempted to work with the coach to move the prayers to a less-visible area, but the coach continued his prayers on field after the game, and the district opted not to renew his contract. The Supreme Court ruled in favor of the coach, in that the coach's freedom of religion allowed him to pray whenever he wanted, and that the school district had taken a harsh view of this. Instead of applying the Lemon test, the majority decision relied on historical perspectives to reach their decision.

=== Masterpiece Cakeshop ===
Klein v. Oregon Bureau of Labor and Industries is similar. Masterpiece Cakeshop v. Colorado was a Supreme Court case that had been expected to play a significant role in distinction between anti-discrimination laws and freedom of religion. A Colorado bakery, Masterpiece Cakeshop, had refused to bake a cake for a gay couple's marriage, as the owner was a devout Christian and the message he was asked to bake was against his faith. The couple complained to the state, which ultimately sued the bakery for violating the state's anti-discrimination laws. In June 2019, the Supreme Court vacated a ruling by the Oregon Appeals Court, requiring that court to rehear the case in the light of the Masterpiece Cakeshop v. Colorado Civil Rights Commission decision in 2018. The Court did not take any significant steps to clarify where the line was drawn between anti-discrimination laws and freedom of religion, but instead made a more narrow decision that found the state was too aggressive and hostile to the bakery in handling the matter, thus remitting the case to lower courts to review.

=== 303 Creative ===
303 Creative is seen as a followup to Masterpiece Cakeshop. A Colorado web site designer who was Christian wanted to put a message on her business's web page that she would not help to create site with LGBT messaging but would aid customers to find a designer that would do so. However, she found state law would prevent her from having this message as it would be seen as discriminatory. She pre-emptively sued the state on its anti-discrimination laws as they would force her to create web sites against her religious beliefs. The Supreme Court heard the case in December 2022.

== State constitutions and laws ==
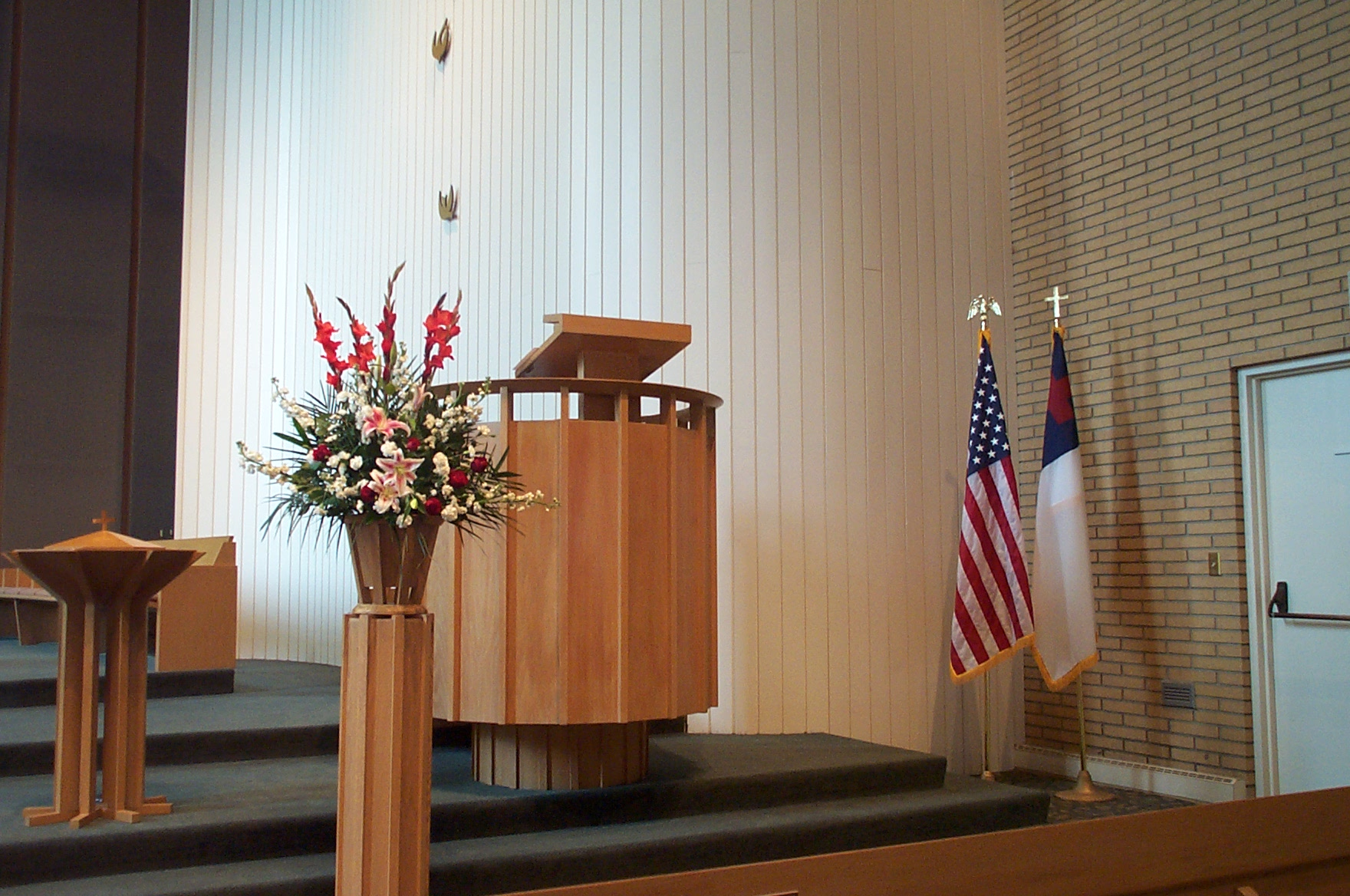
A Christian flag displayed alongside the United States flag next to the pulpit in a church in California. Note the eagle and cross finials on the flag poles.

Under the doctrine of incorporation, the First Amendment has been made applicable to the states. Therefore, the states must guarantee the freedom of religion in the same way the federal government must.

Many states have freedom of religion established in their constitution, though the exact legal consequences of this right vary for historical and cultural reasons. Most states interpret "freedom of religion" as including the freedom of long-established religious communities to remain intact and not be destroyed. By extension, democracies interpret "freedom of religion" as the right of each individual to freely choose to convert from one religion to another, mix religions, or abandon religion altogether.

== Public offices and the military ==
The first Trump administration focused on religious liberty as a vital subject of the presidency. For example, one division on the U.S. Department of Health and Human Services was devoted to Conscience and Religious Freedom. Judges "who have ruled in favor of people seeking religious exemptions to laws" were supported by the president. According to Uddin, author of When Islam Is Not a Religion, during his 2016 election campaign Trump advocated the closure of some mosques. Uddin said that "unfortunately, an increasingly common talking point among many people in the White House and in that sort of larger network is that Islam is not a religion. It is a dangerous political ideology. And therefore, Muslims don't have religious freedom rights."

=== Religious tests ===
The affirmation or denial of specific religious beliefs had, in the past, been made into qualifications for public office; however, the United States Constitution states that the inauguration of a president may include an "affirmation" of the faithful execution of his duties rather than an "oath" to that effect — this provision was included in order to respect the religious prerogatives of the Quakers, a Protestant Christian denomination that declines the swearing of oaths. The U.S. Constitution also provides that "No religious Test shall ever be required as a Qualification of any Office or public Trust under the United States." Several states have language included in their constitutions that requires state office-holders to have particular religious beliefs. These include Arkansas, Maryland, Massachusetts, North Carolina, Pennsylvania, South Carolina, Tennessee, and Texas. Some of these beliefs (or oaths) were historically required of jurors and witnesses in court. Even though they are still on the books, these provisions have been rendered unenforceable by U.S. Supreme Court decisions.

With reference to the use of animals, the U.S. Supreme Court decision in the cases of the Church of the Lukumi Babalu Aye v. City of Hialeah in 1993 upheld the right of Santeria adherents to practice ritual animal sacrifice with Justice Anthony Kennedy stating in the decision, "religious beliefs need not be acceptable, logical, consistent or comprehensible to others in order to merit First Amendment protection". (quoted by Justice Kennedy from the opinion by Justice Burger in Thomas v. Review Board of the Indiana Employment Security Division 450 U.S. 707 (1981)) Likewise in Texas in 2009, issues that related to animal sacrifice and animal rights were taken to the 5th U.S. Circuit Court of Appeals in the case of Jose Merced, President Templo Yoruba Omo Orisha Texas, Inc., v. City of Euless. The court ruled that the free exercise of religion was meritorious and prevailing and that Merced was entitled under the Texas Religious Freedom and Restoration Act (TRFRA) to an injunction preventing the city of Euless, Texas from enforcing its ordinances that burdened his religious practices relating to the use of animals.

Religious liberty has not prohibited states or the federal government from prohibiting or regulating certain behaviors; i.e. prostitution, gambling, alcohol and certain drugs, although some libertarians interpret religious freedom to extend to these behaviors. The United States Supreme Court has ruled that a right to privacy or a due process right does prevent the government from prohibiting adult access to birth control, pornography, and from outlawing sodomy between consenting adults and early trimester abortions.

In practice committees questioning nominees for public office sometimes ask detailed questions about their religious beliefs. The political reason for this may be to expose the nominee to public ridicule for holding a religious belief contrary to the majority of the population. This practice has drawn ire from some for violating the No Religious Test Clause.

==== States ====
Some state constitutions in the US require belief in God or a Supreme Being as a prerequisite for holding public office or being a witness in court. This applies to Arkansas, Maryland, Mississippi, North Carolina, where the requirement was challenged and overturned in Voswinkel v. Hunt (1979), South Carolina, Tennessee, and Texas, debatably. A unanimous 1961 U.S. Supreme Court decision in Torcaso v. Watkins held that the First and Fourteenth Amendments to the federal Constitution override these state requirements, so they are not enforced.

=== Oath of public office ===
The No Religious Test Clause of the U.S. constitution states that "no religious test shall ever be required as a qualification to any office or public trust under the United States." Although it has become tradition for US presidents to end their Presidential Oath with "so help me God", this is not required by the Constitution. The same applies to the Vice President, the House of Representatives, the Senate, the members of the Cabinet, and all other civil and military officers and federal employees, who can either make an affirmation or take an oath ending with "so help me God."

=== Military ===
After reports in August 2010 that soldiers who refused to attend a Christian band's concert at a Virginia military base were essentially punished by being banished to their barracks and told to clean them up, an Army spokesman said that an investigation was underway and "If something like that were to have happened, it would be contrary to Army policy."

== Religious holidays and work ==
Problems sometimes arise in the workplace concerning religious observance when a private employer discharges an employee for failure to report to work on what the employee considers a holy day or a day of rest. In the United States, the view that has generally prevailed is that firing for any cause in general renders a former employee ineligible for unemployment compensation, but that this is no longer the case if the "cause" is religious in nature, especially an employee's unwillingness to work during Jewish Shabbat, Christian Sabbath, Hindu Diwali, or Muslim jumu'ah.

== Situation of minority groups ==
=== Amish ===
As of December 2019, Lenawee County, Michigan has condemned the houses of 14 Amish families over their use of outhouses lacking connections to septic systems approved by the county.

=== Baptists ===
In 1919, Harvey Boyce Taylor, a Baptist pastor in Murray, Kentucky, was jailed and fined for holding church related gatherings during the Spanish flu outbreak.

=== Pentecostals ===
In 2020, Rodney Howard-Browne, a Pentecostal pastor in Florida, was arrested for holding church services and claiming that his church's ministry was "essential" and should not be shut down during the 2020 coronavirus pandemic. Another Pentecostal pastor, Tony Spell in Louisiana, was charged with six misdemeanor counts after holding church services in Central, Louisiana when the governor had issued an order against gatherings of ten or more people.

In 2020, South Bay United Pentecostal Church sued Governor Gavin Newsom (D-CA) for his COVID-19 restrictions on public gatherings and indoor singing. The Supreme Court denied injunctive relief on a 5–4 breakdown, with Justice Kavanaugh writing in dissent that the order was not religiously neutral and targeted religious congregations.

On May 21, 2020, First Pentecostal Church in Holly Springs, Mississippi—which had defied stay at home orders—was burned to the ground with a spray painted message "Bet you stay home now you hypokrites [sic]." The church had fought the city of Holly Springs for the city trying to stop Bible study meetings during the COVID-19 Pandemic.

=== Catholics ===
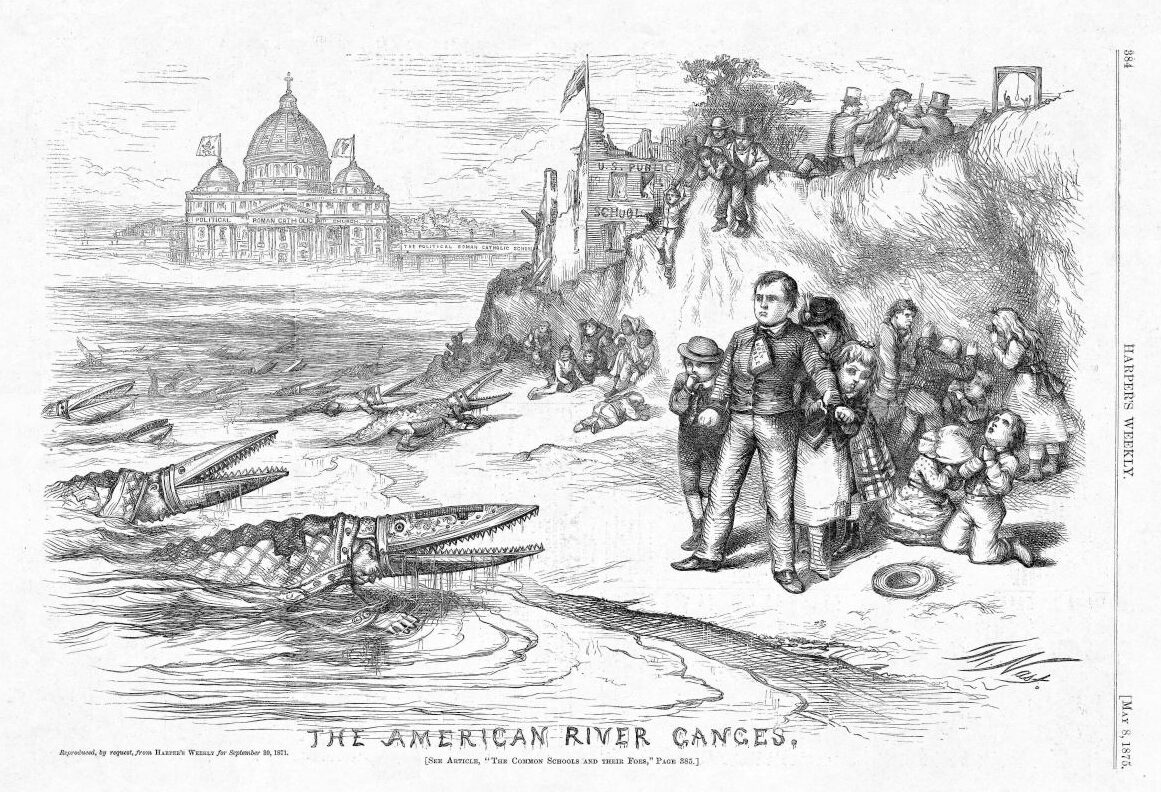
Famous 1876 editorial cartoon by Thomas Nast showing bishops as crocodiles attacking public schools, with the connivance of Irish Catholic politicians

John Higham described anti-Catholicism as "the most luxuriant, tenacious tradition of paranoiac agitation in American history". Anti-Catholicism which was prominent in the United Kingdom was exported to the United States. Two types of anti-Catholic rhetoric existed in colonial society. The first, derived from the heritage of the Protestant Reformation and the religious wars of the 16th century, consisted of the "Anti-Christ" and the "Whore of Babylon" variety and dominated Anti-Catholic thought until the late 17th century. The second was a more secular variety which focused on the supposed intrigue of the Catholics intent on extending medieval despotism worldwide.

Historian Arthur Schlesinger Sr. has called Anti-Catholicism "the deepest-held bias in the history of the American people."

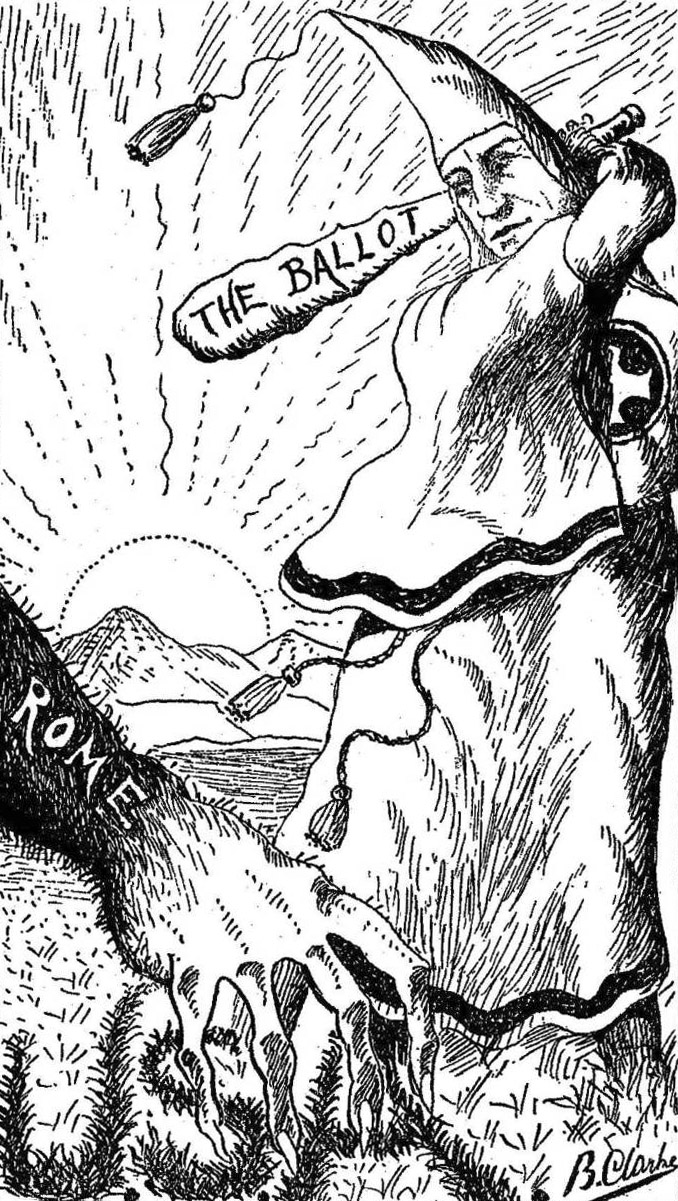
Rev. Branford Clarke illustration in Heroes of the Fiery Cross 1928 by Bishop Alma White Published by the Pillar of Fire Church in Zarephath, NJ

During the Plundering Time, Protestant pirates robbed Catholic residents of the British colony of Maryland. Because many of the British colonists, such as the Puritans and Congregationalists, were fleeing religious persecution by the Church of England, much of early American religious culture exhibited the more extreme anti-Catholic bias of these Protestant denominations. Monsignor John Tracy Ellis wrote that a "universal anti-Catholic bias was brought to Jamestown in 1607 and vigorously cultivated in all the thirteen colonies from Massachusetts to Georgia." Colonial charters and laws contained specific proscriptions against Roman Catholics. Monsignor Ellis noted that a common hatred of the Roman Catholic Church could unite Anglican clerics and Puritan ministers despite their differences and conflicts.

Some of America's Founding Fathers held anti-clerical beliefs. For example, in 1788, John Jay urged the New York Legislature to require office-holders to renounce foreign authorities "in all matters ecclesiastical as well as civil." Thomas Jefferson wrote: "History, I believe, furnishes no example of a priest-ridden people maintaining a free civil government," and, "In every country and in every age, the priest has been hostile to liberty. He is always in alliance with the despot, abetting his abuses in return for protection to his own."

Some states devised loyalty oaths designed to exclude Catholics from state and local office. The public support for American independence and the First Amendment of the U.S. Constitution by prominent American Catholics like Charles Carroll of Carrollton, the only Catholic signer of the Declaration of Independence, and his second cousins, Bishop John Carroll and Daniel Carroll, allowed Roman Catholics to be included in the constitutional protections of civil and religious liberty.

Anti-Catholic animus in the United States reached a peak in the 19th century when the Protestant population became alarmed by the influx of Catholic immigrants. Some American Protestants, having an increased interest in prophecies regarding the end of time, claimed that the Catholic Church was the Whore of Babylon in the Book of Revelation. The resulting "nativist" movement, which achieved prominence in the 1840s, was whipped into a frenzy of anti-Catholicism that led to mob violence, the burning of Catholic property, and the killing of Catholics. This violence was fed by claims that Catholics were destroying the culture of the United States. The nativist movement found expression in a national political movement called the Know-Nothing Party of the 1850s, which (unsuccessfully) ran former president Millard Fillmore as its presidential candidate in 1856.

The founder of the Know-Nothing movement, Lewis C. Levin, based his political career entirely on anti-Catholicism, and served three terms in the U.S. House of Representatives (1845–1851), after which he campaigned for Fillmore and other "nativist" candidates.

After 1875 many states passed constitutional provisions, called "Blaine Amendments, forbidding tax money be used to fund parochial schools. In 2002, the United States Supreme Court partially vitiated these amendments, when they ruled that vouchers were constitutional if tax dollars followed a child to a school, even if it were religious.

Anti-Catholicism was widespread in the 1920s; anti-Catholics, including the Ku Klux Klan, believed that Catholicism was incompatible with democracy and that parochial schools encouraged separatism and kept Catholics from becoming loyal Americans. The Catholics responded to such prejudices by repeatedly asserting their rights as American citizens and by arguing that they, not the nativists (anti-Catholics), were true patriots, since they believed in the right to freedom of religion.

The 1928 presidential campaign of Al Smith was a rallying point for the Klan and the tide of anti-Catholicism in the U.S. The Catholic Church of the Little Flower was first built in 1925 in Royal Oak, Michigan, a largely Protestant area. Two weeks after it opened, the Ku Klux Klan burned a cross in front of the church. The church burned down in a fire in 1936. In response, the church built a fireproof crucifixion tower, as a "cross they could not burn".

In 1922, the voters of Oregon passed an initiative amending Oregon Law Section 5259, the Compulsory Education Act. The law unofficially became known as the Oregon School Law. The citizens' initiative was primarily aimed at eliminating parochial schools, including Catholic schools. The law caused outraged Catholics to organize locally and nationally for the right to send their children to Catholic schools. In Pierce v. Society of Sisters (1925), the United States Supreme Court declared the Oregon's Compulsory Education Act unconstitutional in a ruling that has been called "the Magna Carta of the parochial school system." However, there is still controversy over the legality of parish schools. In December 2018, Ed Mechmann, the director of public policy at the Roman Catholic Archdiocese of New York noted that the new regulations from the New York State Education Department would "give local school boards virtually unlimited power over private religious schools. There is no protection against government officials who are hostile to religious schools or who just want to eliminate the competition."

In 1928, Al Smith became the first Roman Catholic to gain a major party's nomination for president, and his religion became an issue during the campaign. Many Protestants feared that Smith would take orders from church leaders in Rome in making decisions affecting the country.

A key factor that hurt John F. Kennedy in his 1960 campaign for the presidency of the United States was the widespread prejudice against his Roman Catholic religion; some Protestants, including Norman Vincent Peale, believed that, if he were elected president, Kennedy would have to take orders from the pope in Rome. To address fears that his Roman Catholicism would impact his decision-making, John F. Kennedy famously told the Greater Houston Ministerial Association on September 12, 1960, "I am not the Catholic candidate for President. I am the Democratic Party's candidate for President who also happens to be a Catholic. I do not speak for my Church on public matters — and the Church does not speak for me." He promised to respect the separation of church and state and not to allow Catholic officials to dictate public policy to him. Kennedy also raised the question of whether one-quarter of Americans were relegated to second-class citizenship just because they were Catholic.

Kennedy went on to win the national popular vote over Richard Nixon by just one tenth of one percentage point (0.1%) – the closest popular-vote margin of the 20th century. In the electoral college, Kennedy's victory was larger, as he took 303 electoral votes to Nixon's 219 (269 were needed to win). The New York Times, summarizing the discussion late in November, spoke of a "narrow consensus" among the experts that Kennedy had won more than he lost as a result of his Catholicism, as Catholics flocked to Kennedy to demonstrate their group solidarity in demanding political equality.

In 2011, the United States Conference of Catholic Bishops argued that the Obama Administration put an undue burden upon Catholics and forced them to violate their right to freedom of religion as part of the Patient Protection and Affordable Care Act.

Another concern relating to the Catholic Church and politics in the United States is the freedom to provide church services to illegally undocumented immigrants, as most hail from predominantly Roman Catholic nations.

Holy See–United States relations resumed in 1984.

In 2023, a leaked FBI intelligence memo from the Richmond Field Office characterized "radical traditionalist Catholics" as potential domestic violent extremists, prompting condemnation from Catholic organizations and congressional investigations. The United States Conference of Catholic Bishops called the memo "religious profiling," and the Department of Justice Office of the Inspector General found the memo "failed to adhere to analytic tradecraft standards" while finding no evidence of malicious intent.

=== Christian Scientists ===
The Christian Scientists have specific protections relating to their beliefs on refusing medical care and the use of prayer.

=== Jews ===
- Letter to the Hebrew Congregation in Newport
- General Order No. 11 (1862)
- American Jews
- History of the Jews in the United States

=== Muslims ===
Following the 1965 Immigration and Naturalization Act, more than 1.1 million new Muslims immigrated to the United States in the late 20th century. After that, some geopolitical clashes between the United States and several Muslim nations had mainly impact on the "treatment of Muslim Americans". For example, 1967 the Six Day War, had negative coverage of Arabs and Islam in the American media.

Islam protects the freedom of belief, which aligns with the principle of religious freedom in the United States: "...the freedom of religion...is hardwired into Islamic Law". According to early Islamic governance, there were protections established to safeguard religious rights for minorities (i.e. non-Muslims) living under a Muslim majority rule. However, after the 9/11 terror attacks in the United States, there was a surge of Islamophobia leading to discrimination and harassment against Muslim Americans. Muslims who visibly practice their religion, such as hijabi women, experience more discrimination, which has been associated with negative mental health ramifications.

=== Hindus ===
According to Harvard University, Hinduism in the United States can be traced back to the 19th century, with trade and commerce occurring between India and the US. This religion was also written about by famous American authors, such as Ralph Waldo Emerson and Henry David Thoreau, whom were moderately influenced by Hindu religious texts. In 1893, Swami Vivekananda travelled from India and spoke at the World's Parliament of Religions. His introduction to Hindu philosophy to the American public could be seen as a turning point, as it helped lead to the establishment of Hindu communities.

A wave of Hindu immigrants began to enter the US after 1965, due to a change in immigration law making it easier for them. They built temples for worship and shared their traditions through cultural rituals and art.

=== Latter Day Saint movement (1820–1890) ===
Historically, the Latter Day Saint movement, which is often called Mormonism, has been the victim of religious violence beginning with reports by founder Joseph Smith immediately after his First Vision 1820 and continuing as the movement grew and migrated from its inception in western New York to Ohio, Missouri, and Illinois. The violence culminated when Smith was assassinated by a mob of 200 men in Carthage Jail in 1844. Joseph Smith had surrendered himself previously to the authorities, who failed to protect him. As a result of the violence they were faced with in the East, the Mormon pioneers, led by Brigham Young, migrated westwards and eventually founded Salt Lake City, and many other communities along the Mormon Corridor.

Smith and his followers experienced relatively low levels of persecution in New York and Ohio, although one incident involved church members being tarred and feathered. They would eventually move on to Missouri, where some of the worst atrocities against Mormons would take place. Smith declared the area around Independence, Missouri to be the site of Zion, inspiring a massive influx of Mormon converts. Locals, alarmed by rumors of the strange, new religion (including rumors of polygamy), attempted to drive the Mormons out. This resulted in the 1838 Mormon War, the Haun's Mill massacre, and the issue of the Missouri Executive Order 44 by Governor Lilburn Boggs, which ordered " ... Mormons must be treated as enemies, and must be exterminated or driven from the state ... ". The majority of Mormons would flee to Illinois, where they were received warmly by the village of Commerce, Illinois. The Mormons quickly expanded the town and renamed it Nauvoo, which was one of the largest cities in Illinois at the time. The economic, political, and religious dominance of the Mormons (Smith was mayor of the city and commander of the local militia, the Nauvoo Legion) inspired mobs to attack the city, and Smith was arrested for ordering the destruction of an anti-Mormon newspaper, the Nauvoo Expositor, although he acted with the consent of the city council. He was imprisoned, along with his brother Hyrum Smith, at Carthage Jail, where they were attacked by a mob and murdered.

After a succession crisis, most of the Mormons united under Brigham Young, who organized an evacuation from Nauvoo and from the United States itself after the federal government refused to protect the Mormons. Young and an eventual 50,000–70,000 would cross the Great Plains to settle in the Salt Lake Valley and the surrounding area. After the events of the Mexican–American War, the area became a United States territory. Young immediately petitioned for the addition of the State of Deseret, but the federal government declined. Instead, Congress carved out the much smaller Utah Territory. Over the next 46 years, several actions of the federal government were directed at Mormons, specifically to curtail the practice of polygamy and to reduce their political and economic power. These included the Utah War, Morrill Anti-Bigamy Act, Poland Act, Edmunds Act, and Edmunds–Tucker Act. In 1890, LDS Church president Wilford Woodruff issued the Manifesto, ending polygamy.

With the concept of plural marriage, from 1830 to 1890 the Mormon faith allowed its members to practice polygamy; after 1843 this was limited to polygyny (one man could have several wives). The notion of polygamy was not only generally disdained by most of Joseph Smith's contemporaries, it is also contrary to the traditional Christian understanding of marriage. After 1844 the United States government passed legislation aimed specifically at the Mormon practice of polygamy until the Church of Jesus Christ of Latter-day Saints (LDS Church) officially renounced it. In the case of Reynolds v. United States, the U.S. supreme court concluded that "religious duty" was not a suitable defense to an indictment for polygamy; therefore, a law against polygamy is not legally considered to discriminate against a religion that endorses polygamy. When their appeals to the courts and lawmakers were exhausted and once church leaders were satisfied that God had accepted what they saw as their sacrifice for the principle, the prophet leader of the church announced that he had received inspiration that God had accepted their obedience and rescinded the commandment for plural marriage. In 1890, an official declaration was issued by the church prohibiting further plural marriages. Utah was admitted to the Union on January 4, 1896.

=== Native Americans ===
Aside from the general issues in the relations between Europeans and Native Americans since the initial European colonization of the Americas, there has been a historic suppression of Native American religions as well as some current charges of religious discrimination against Native Americans by the U.S. government.

With the practice of the Americanization of Native Americans, Native American children were sent to Christian boarding schools where they were forced to worship as Christians, and traditional customs were banned. Until the Freedom of Religion Act 1978, "spiritual leaders [of Native Americans] ran the risk of jail sentences of up to 30 years for simply practicing their rituals." The traditional indigenous Sun Dance was illegal from the 1880s (Canada) or 1904 (USA) to the 1970s.

Continuing charges of religious discrimination have largely centered on the eagle feather law, the use of ceremonial peyote, and the repatriation of Native American human remains and cultural and religious objects:

- The eagle feather law, which governs the possession and religious use of eagle feathers, was written with the intention to protect then dwindling eagle populations on one hand while still protecting traditional Native American spiritual and religious customs, to which the use of eagle feather is central, on the other hand. As a result, the possession of eagle feathers is restricted to ethnic Native Americans, a policy that is seen as controversial for several reasons.
- Peyote, a spineless cactus found in the desert southwest and Mexico, is commonly used in certain traditions of Native American religion and spirituality, most notably in the Native American Church. Prior to the passage of the American Indian Religious Freedom Act (AIRFA) in 1978, and as amended in 1994, the religious use of peyote was not afforded legal protection. This resulted in the arrest of many Native Americans and non-Native Americans participating in traditional indigenous religion and spirituality.
- Native Americans often hold strong personal and spiritual connections to their ancestors and often believe that their remains should rest undisturbed. This has often placed Native Americans at odds with archaeologists who have often dug on Native American burial grounds and other sites considered sacred, often removing artifacts and human remains – an act considered sacrilegious by many Native Americans. For years, Native American communities decried the removal of ancestral human remains and cultural and religious objects, charging that such activities are acts of genocide, religious persecution, and discrimination. Many Native Americans called on the government, museums, and private collectors for the return of remains and sensitive objects for reburial. The Native American Graves Protection and Repatriation Act (NAGPRA), which gained passage in 1990, established a means for Native Americans to request the return or "repatriation" of human remains and other sensitive cultural, religious, and funerary items held by federal agencies and federally assisted museums and institutions.

=== Atheists ===
A 2006 study at the University of Minnesota showed atheists to be the most distrusted minority among Americans. In the study, sociologists Penny Edgell, Joseph Gerties and Douglas Hartmann conducted a survey of American public opinion on attitudes towards different groups. 40% of respondents characterized atheists as a group that "does not at all agree with my vision of American society", putting atheists well ahead of every other group, with the next highest being Muslims (26%) and homosexuals (23%). When participants were asked whether they agreed with the statement, "I would disapprove if my child wanted to marry a member of this group," atheists again led minorities, with 48% disapproval, followed by Muslims (34%) and African-Americans (27%). Joe Foley, co-chairman for Campus Atheists and Secular Humanists, commented on the results, "I know atheists aren't studied that much as a sociological group, but I guess atheists are one of the last groups remaining that it's still socially acceptable to hate." A University of British Columbia study conducted in the United States found that believers distrust atheists as much as they distrust rapists. The study also showed that atheists have lower employment prospects.

Several private organizations, the most notable being the Boy Scouts of America, do not allow atheist members. However, this policy has come under fire by organizations who assert that the Boy Scouts of America do benefit from taxpayer money and thus cannot be called a truly private organization, and thus must admit atheists, and others currently barred from membership. An organization called Scouting for All, founded by Eagle Scout Steven Cozza, is at the forefront of the movement.

==== Court cases ====
In the 1994 case Board of Education of Kiryas Joel Village School District v. Grumet, Supreme Court Justice David Souter wrote in the opinion for the Court that: "government should not prefer one religion to another, or religion to irreligion". Everson v. Board of Education established that "neither a state nor the Federal Government can pass laws which aid one religion, aid all religions, or prefer one religion over another". This applies the Establishment Clause to the states as well as the federal government. However, several state constitutions make the protection of persons from religious discrimination conditional on their acknowledgment of the existence of a deity, making freedom of religion in those states inapplicable to atheists. These state constitutional clauses have not been tested. Civil rights cases are typically brought in federal courts, so such state provisions are mainly of symbolic importance.

In Elk Grove Unified School District v. Newdow (2004), after atheist Michael Newdow challenged the phrase "under God" in the United States Pledge of Allegiance, the Ninth Circuit Court of Appeals found the phrase unconstitutional. Although the decision was stayed pending the outcome of an appeal, there was the prospect that the pledge would cease to be legally usable without modification in schools in the western United States, over which the Ninth Circuit has jurisdiction. This resulted in political furor, and both houses of Congress passed resolutions condemning the decision, unanimously. On June 26, a Republican-dominated group of 100–150 congressmen stood outside the capital and recited the pledge, showing how much they disagreed with the decision. The Supreme Court subsequently reversed the decision, ruling that Newdow did not have standing to bring his case, thus disposing of the case without ruling on the constitutionality of the pledge.

=== Case studies ===
- The Eagle Feather Law, which governs the possession and religious use of eagle feathers, was officially written to protect then dwindling eagle populations while still protecting traditional Native American spiritual and religious customs, of which the use of eagles are central. The Eagle Feather Law later met charges of promoting racial and religious discrimination due to the law's provision authorizing the possession of eagle feathers to members of only one ethnic group, Native Americans, and forbidding Native Americans from including non-Native Americans in indigenous customs involving eagle feathers—a common modern practice dating back to the early 16th century.
- Charges of religious and racial discrimination have also been found in the education system. In a recent example, the dormitory policies at Boston University and The University of South Dakota were charged with racial and religious discrimination when they forbade a university dormitory resident from smudging while praying. The policy at The University of South Dakota was later changed to permit students to pray while living in the university dorms.
- In 2004, a case involving five Ohio prison inmates (two followers of Asatru (a modern form of Norse paganism), a minister of the Church of Jesus Christ–Christian, a Wiccan witch (neopaganism), and a Satanist) protesting denial of access to ceremonial items and opportunities for group worship was brought before the Supreme Court. The Boston Globe reports on the 2005 decision of Cutter v. Wilkinson in favour of the claimants as a notable case. Among the denied objects was instructions for runic writing requested by an Asatruar. Inmates of the "Intensive Management Unit" at Washington State Penitentiary who are adherents of Asatru in 2001 were deprived of their Thor's Hammer medallions. In 2007, a federal judge confirmed that Asatru adherents in US prisons have the right to possess a Thor's Hammer pendant. An inmate sued the Virginia Department of Corrections after he was denied it while members of other religions were allowed their medallions.

== Replacement of freedom of religion with freedom of worship ==
In 2016, John Miller of The Wall Street Journal noted that the term "freedom of religion" was recently restored to US immigrant naturalization tests and study booklets. It had previously been changed to the more limited "freedom of worship."

In 2014, Kamala Harris and others signed a brief submitted to the Supreme Court that "Rights to the free exercise of religious beliefs [...] protect the development and expression of an 'inner sanctum' of personal religious faith. Free exercise rights have thus also been understood as personal, relating only to individual believers and to a limited class of associations comprising or representing them."

== See also ==
- Church property disputes in the United States
- Entheogenic use of cannabis
- History of religion in the United States
- Human rights in the United States
- International Religious Freedom Act of 1998
- Nihang, a Sikh order who carry weapons and use cannabis as part of their religious duties
- Religion in the United States
- Letter to the Hebrew Congregation in Newport
- Religious affiliations of United States Presidents
- Religious discrimination in the United States
- Separation of church and state in the United States
- Status of religious freedom by country
- Legal aspects of ritual slaughter § United States
- Faith healing § United States law
- Vaccination and religion § Exemptions
- Circumcision and law § United States
- FBI Richmond Catholic memo investigation
