= Religious discrimination in the United States =

Religious discrimination in the United States is valuing or treating a person or group differently because of what they do or do not believe. Specifically, it occurs when adherents of different religions (or denominations) are treated unequally, either before the law or in institutional settings such as employment or housing.

Steve Pfaff, a University of Washington professor of sociology said that "Religious bias may be a very serious problem, but it has been studied less than other types of discrimination, such as race- or gender-based discrimination."

== Background ==
In the United States, the Free Exercise Clause of the First Amendment states that "Congress shall make no law respecting an establishment of religion, or prohibiting the free exercise thereof".

In a 1979 consultation on the issues, the United States Commission on Civil Rights defined religious discrimination in relation to the civil rights guaranteed by the Fifth Amendment to the United States Constitution. Whereas religious civil liberties, such as the right to hold or not to hold a religious belief, are essential for Freedom of Religion (in the United States secured by the First Amendment), religious discrimination occurs when someone is denied "the equal protection of the laws, equality of status under the law, equal treatment in the administration of justice, and equality of opportunity and access to employment, education, housing, public services and facilities, and public accommodation because of their exercise of their right to religious freedom."

However, in 1878, the U.S. Supreme Court has ruled that religious duty is not a suitable defense to a criminal indictment, and that religious activities could be regulated by law.

== Notable examples ==
=== Antisemitism ===
Antisemitism in the United States describes incidents of hatred, hostility, harm, prejudice or discrimination against people identifying as Jews, religiously, culturally and/or ethnically within the United States of America. It typically includes:

- Attitudes, including those of organized hate groups such as the Ku Klux Klan, Neo-Nazi Organizations, Nation of Islam and those more widely disseminated in the population;
- Behaviors that can threaten the security of American Jews, as measured by the occurrence of specific incidents, including hate crimes; and
- Discrimination against Jews, threatening their security.

Federal Bureau of Investigation (FBI) data shows that in every year since 1991, Jews were the most frequent targets of religiously motivated hate crimes even though current numbers may be underreported, as is the case for many other targeted groups. As of 2023, the FBI calculated that antisemitic incidents accounted for 68% of all religion-based hate crimes, an increase of 63% since 2022, while the American Jewish Committee (AJC) said that figure was "likely much lower" than the actual number as hate crimes had been "widely underreported across the country." A 2025 survey conducted by the Anti-Defamation League, concluded that "60% of Americans ... at least somewhat agree that antisemitism is a serious problem." Twenty-four percent of Americans, however, maintained that recent antisemitic attacks were understandable.

In the past, incidents of antisemitism were mostly confined to organized antisemitic groups, mainly from a white nationalist or white supremacist backgrounds, but also including the Nation of Islam and some branches of the Black Hebrew Israelites, who have also been identified as antisemitic, reflecting heightened levels of antisemitism among some African-American communities. Over the last decade or more, however, antisemitism has been rising in the U.S., and there has been increasing evidence of antisemitism on both sides of the American political spectrum, as Ambassador Deborah Lipstadt, Special Envoy to Monitor and Combat Antisemitism for the U.S. Department of State highlighted in the title of remarks she gave in 2024: "From Right to Left and In Between: Jew-hatred Across the Political Divide."

In 2024, the Southern Poverty Law Center (SPLC) also summarized their latest findings on the subject in Antisemitism. On the left, they noted an increase in incidents "that began with the Oct. 7, 2023, attacks that initiated the Israel—Hamas war. These incidents included vandalism of Jewish institutions and places of worship, flyering from known hate groups, and assaults on Jewish people and business." On the right, they found that "Hate groups and other bigoted actors have perpetuated the antisemitic narrative that Jewish people are helping to further the normalization and acceptance of LGBTQ+ identities in order to further social strife." Likewise, the far right argues that Jews are orchestrating a "great replacement" in which they aid the immigration of non-white people — especially those who are Muslim — into majority-white counties to challenge and erode white supremacy."

There have been a range of approaches to combating antisemitism, both by government when the Biden administration launched the U.S. National Strategy to Counter Antisemitism and by Jewish communities whose tactics have included the creation of more holocaust museums. Nonetheless, incidents of antisemitism continue to rise in the U.S. and worldwide. One result, according to Gallop, is "most Jewish Americans have felt reluctant to share their religious affiliation."

=== Discrimination against Muslims ===
Based on the research carried out by the University of Washington, Muslims and atheists in the United States deal with experience religious discrimination more than those of Christian faiths.

According to a Pew Research Center survey carried out in March 2019, "Most American adults (82%) say Muslims are subject to at least some discrimination in the U.S. today". The 2017 survey of Muslim Americans illustrated that "Among U.S. Muslims themselves, many say they have experienced specific instances of discrimination, including being treated with suspicion, singled out by airport security or called offensive names." 63 percent of American adults believed in that being Muslim hurts someone's chances for advancement in American society at least".

=== Discrimination against Neopagans ===
According to Starhawk, modern pagans, especially Wiccans and Ásatrú followers, encounter widespread religious discrimination across multiple fields.

=== Reynolds v. United States ===
In 1878, the U.S. supreme court, in Reynolds v. United States, ruled that a law against bigamy was not considered to be religiously discriminatory against members of the Church of Jesus Christ of Latter-day Saints (LDS Church), who were practicing polygamy up until 1890. George Reynolds was a member of the LDS Church, and was convicted of bigamy under the Morrill Anti-Bigamy Act. He was secretary to Brigham Young and presented himself as a test of the federal government's attempt to outlaw polygamy.

The Court investigated the history of religious freedom in the United States and quoted a letter from Thomas Jefferson in which he wrote that there was a distinction between religious belief and action that flowed from religious belief. The former "lies solely between man and his God," therefore "the legislative powers of the government reach actions only, and not opinions." The court considered that if polygamy was allowed, someone might eventually argue that human sacrifice was a necessary part of their religion, and "to permit this would be to make the professed doctrines of religious belief superior to the law of the land, and in effect to permit every citizen to become a law unto himself." The Court believed the First Amendment forbade Congress from legislating against opinion, but allowed it to legislate against action. Therefore, religious duty was not a suitable defense to a criminal indictment, religious activates could be regulated by law.

=== Religious tests ===
The No Religious Test Clause of the United States Constitution is found in Article VI, paragraph 3. This has been interpreted to mean that no federal employee, whether elected or appointed, career or political, can be required to adhere to or accept any religion or belief.

However, some state and local jurisdictions have enacted legal restrictions that require a religious test as a qualification for holding public office. For instance in Texas an official may be "excluded from holding office" if he or she does not "acknowledge the existence of a Supreme Being." (i.e. God), thus atheists, agnostics, most Satanists, some Unitarian Universalists and New Age followers, who do not believe in a supreme being would be excluded from public office.

=== Native American religions ===
==== Peyote usage ====
Peyote is listed by the United States DEA as a Schedule I controlled substance. However, practitioners of the Peyote Way Church of God, a Native American religion, perceive the regulations regarding the use of Peyote as discriminating, leading to religious discrimination issues regarding about the U.S. policy towards drugs. As the result of Peyote Way Church of God, Inc. v. Thornburgh the American Indian Religious Freedom Act of 1978 was passed. This federal statute allow the "Traditional Indian religious use of the peyote sacrament," exempting only use by Native American persons. Other jurisdictions have similar statutory exemptions in reaction to the U.S. Supreme Court's decision in Employment Division v. Smith, 494 U.S. 872 (1990), which held that laws prohibiting the use of peyote that do not specifically exempt religious use nevertheless do not violate the Free Exercise Clause of the First Amendment.

==== Eagle Feather usage ====
The Eagle Feather Law, which governs the possession and religious use of eagle feathers, was officially written to protect then dwindling eagle populations while still protecting traditional Native American spiritual and religious customs, of which the use of eagles are central. The Eagle Feather Law later met charges of promoting racial and religious discrimination due to the law's provision authorizing the possession of eagle feathers to members of only one ethnic group, Native Americans, and forbidding Native Americans from including non-Native Americans in indigenous customs involving eagle feathers—a common modern practice dating back to the early 16th century.

=== Boston University and University of South Dakota ===
Charges of religious and racial discrimination have also been found in the education system. In a recent example, the dormitory policies at Boston University and The University of South Dakota were charged with racial and religious discrimination when they forbade a university dormitory resident from smudging while praying. The policy at The University of South Dakota was later changed to permit students to pray while living in the university dorms. Another example concerns the Peralta Community College District which threatened to discipline two students when they prayed for a sick professor. The college later rescinded the warnings when threatened with a lawsuit.

=== Church of Jesus Christ–Christian ===
In 2004, a case involving five Ohio prison inmates (two followers of Asatru, a minister of the Church of Jesus Christ–Christian, a Wiccan witch and a Satanist) protesting denial of access to ceremonial items and opportunities for group worship was brought before the Supreme Court. The Boston Globe reports on the 2005 decision of Cutter v. Wilkinson in favour of the claimants as a notable case. Among the denied objects was instructions for runic writing requested by an Asatruer. Inmates of the "Intensive Management Unit" at Washington State Penitentiary who are adherents of Asatru in 2001 were deprived of their Thor's Hammer medallions. In 2007, a federal judge confirmed that Asatru adherents in US prisons have the right to possess a Thor's Hammer pendant. An inmate sued the Virginia Department of Corrections after he was denied it while members of other religions were allowed their medallions.

=== Merrill Lynch ===
Religious discrimination has also been documented in employment in the United States, such as an Equal Employment Opportunity Commission (EEOC) lawsuit alleging discrimination against an Iranian-Muslim employee by the Merrill Lynch company in the United States.

=== Cooke et al v. Colorado City, Town of et al ===
On March 20, 2014, a jury hearing the case of Cooke et al v. Colorado City, Town of et al ruled that the twin towns of Colorado City and Hildale had discriminated against Ronald and Jinjer Cooke because they were not members of the Fundamentalist Church of Jesus Christ of Latter-Day Saints (FLDS church). The Cookes were awarded $5.2 million for "religious discrimination". The Cooke family moved to the Short Creek Community in 2008 but were refused access to utilities by the town governments. As a result of the ruling, Arizona's Attorney General Tom Horne issued a press release stating that he "wants to eradicate discrimination in two polygamous towns" and believes that the court ruling will give him the tools to do it.

== See also ==
Main pages

- Religion in the United States
- Freedom of religion in the United States
- History of religion in the United States
- Religious discrimination
- Islamophobia in the United States
- Antisemitism in the United States
- Anti-Catholicism in the United States
- Anti-atheist sentiment in the United States

General

- Secularization
- Discrimination
- Civil rights
- Intersectionality
- Islamic religious police
- OUT Campaign
- List of anti-discrimination acts
- Religious intolerance
- Religious persecution
- Religious segregation
- Religious violence
- Sectarian violence

Specific

- Anti-Catholicism
- Anti-Christian sentiment
- Anti-Protestantism
- Anti-clericalism
- Anti-Judaism
- Antisemitism
- Anti-Islamism, not to be confused with Islamophobia
- Discrimination against atheists
- Religious discrimination against Neopagans
- Anti-cult movement, people and groups who oppose cults and new religious movements
- Anti-Mormonism
- Anti-Hinduism
