= Discrimination against atheists =

Discrimination based on lack of religious belief

Discrimination against atheists, sometimes called atheophobia, atheistophobia, or anti-atheism, both at present and historically, includes persecution of and discrimination against people who are identified as atheists. Discrimination against atheists may be manifested by negative attitudes, prejudice, hostility, hatred, fear, or intolerance towards atheists and atheism or even the complete denial of atheists' existence. It is often expressed in distrust regardless of its manifestation. Perceived atheist prevalence seems to be correlated with reduction in prejudice. There is global prevalence of mistrust in moral perceptions of atheists found in even secular countries and among atheists.

Because atheism can be defined in various ways, those discriminated against or persecuted on the grounds of being atheists might not have been considered atheists in a different time or place. Thirteen Muslim countries officially punish atheism or apostasy by death and Humanists International asserts that "the overwhelming majority" of the 193 member states of the United Nations "at best discriminate against citizens who have no belief in a god and at worst can jail them for offences dubbed blasphemy". It has been argued that the most intense persecutions of atheists such as executions and killings may amount to genocide under the legal definition.

== Ancient times ==
Tim Whitmarsh argues atheism existed in the ancient world, though it remains difficult to assess its extent given that atheists are referenced (usually disparagingly) rather than having surviving writings. Given monotheism at the time was a minority view, atheism generally attacked polytheistic beliefs and associated practices in references found. The word "atheos" (godless) also was used for religious dissent generally (including the monotheists) which complicates study further. Despite these difficulties, Whitmarsh believes that otherwise atheism then was much the same. While atheists (or people perceived as such) were occasionally persecuted, this was rare (perhaps due to being a small group, plus a relative tolerance toward different religious views). Other scholars believe it arose later in the modern era. Lucien Febvre has referred to the "unthinkability" of atheism in its strongest sense before the sixteenth century, because of the "deep religiosity" of that era. Karen Armstrong has concurred, writing "from birth and baptism to death and burial in the churchyard, religion dominated the life of every single man and woman. Every activity of the day, which was punctuated by church bells summoning the faithful to prayer, was saturated with religious beliefs and institutions: they dominated professional and public life—even the guilds and the universities were religious organizations. ... Even if an exceptional man could have achieved the objectivity necessary to question the nature of religion and the existence of God, he would have found no support in either the philosophy or the science of his time." As governmental authority rested on the notion of divine right, it was threatened by those who denied the existence of the local god. Those labeled as atheist, including early Christians, Jews and Sufi Muslims, were as a result targeted for legal persecution.

== Early modern period and Reformation ==
During the early modern period, the term "atheist" was used as an insult and applied to a broad range of people, including those who held opposing theological beliefs, as well as those who had committed suicide, immoral or self-indulgent people, and even opponents of the belief in witchcraft. Atheistic beliefs were seen as threatening to order and society by philosophers such as Thomas Aquinas. Lawyer and scholar Thomas More said that religious tolerance should be extended to all except those who did not believe in a deity or the immortality of the soul. John Locke, a founder of modern notions of religious liberty, argued that atheists (as well as Catholics and Muslims) should not be granted full citizenship rights.

During the Inquisition, several of those who were accused of atheism or blasphemy, or both, were tortured or executed. These included the priest Giulio Cesare Vanini who was strangled and burned in 1619 and the Polish nobleman Kazimierz Łyszczyński who was executed in Warsaw, as well as Etienne Dolet, a Frenchman executed in 1546. Though heralded as atheist martyrs during the nineteenth century, recent scholars hold that the beliefs espoused by Dolet and Vanini are not atheistic in modern terms.

Baruch Spinoza was effectively excommunicated from the Sephardic Jewish community of Amsterdam for atheism, though he did not claim to be an atheist.

== Modern era ==
=== Victorian Britain ===
During the nineteenth century, British atheists, though few in number, were subject to discriminatory practices. The poet Percy Bysshe Shelley was expelled from the University of Oxford and denied custody of his two children after publishing a pamphlet titled The Necessity of Atheism. Those not willing to swear Christian oaths during judicial proceedings were unable to give evidence in court to obtain justice until this requirement was repealed by Acts passed in 1869 and 1870.

Atheist Charles Bradlaugh was elected as a Member of the British Parliament in 1880. He was denied the right to affirm rather than swear his oath of office, and was then denied the ability to swear the oath as other Members objected that he had himself said it would be meaningless. Bradlaugh was re-elected three times before he was finally able to take his seat in 1886 when the Speaker of the House permitted him to take the oath.

=== Francoist Spain ===
The killing of leftists in the Francoist Repression in Spain was justified under the pretext partially of eliminating non-Catholic atheists, which has been argued to make the mass killings amount to genocide in the legal sense.

=== Nazi Germany ===
In Germany during the Nazi era, a 1933 decree stated that "No National Socialist may suffer detriment... on the ground that he does not make any religious profession at all". However, the regime strongly opposed "godless communism", and all of Germany's atheist and largely left-wing freethought organizations such as the German Freethinkers League (500,000 members) were banned the same year; some right-wing groups were tolerated by the Nazis until the mid-1930s. In a speech which he made later in 1933, Hitler claimed that he had "stamped out" the atheistic movement.

During the negotiations which led up to the Nazi-Vatican Reichskonkordat of 26 April 1933, Hitler stated that "Secular schools can never be tolerated" because of their irreligious tendencies. Hitler routinely disregarded this undertaking, and the Reichskonkordat as a whole, and by 1939, all Catholic denominational schools had been disbanded or converted to public facilities.

By 1939, 94.5% of Germans still called themselves Protestant or Catholic, while 3.5% were so-called "Gottgläubige" (lit. "believers in God") and 1.5% were without faith. According to historian Richard J. Evans, those members of the affiliation gottgläubig "were convinced Nazis who had left their Church at the behest of the Party, which had been trying since the mid-1930s to reduce the influence of Christianity in society". Heinrich Himmler was a strong promoter of the gottgläubig movement and did not allow atheists into the SS, arguing that their "refusal to acknowledge higher powers" would be a "potential source of indiscipline". Himmler announced to the SS: "We believe in a God Almighty who stands above us; he has created the earth, the Fatherland, and the Volk, and he has sent us the Führer. Any human being who does not believe in God should be considered arrogant, megalomaniacal, and stupid and thus not suited for the SS." The SS oath (Eidformel der Schutzstaffel), written by Himmler, also specifically denounced atheists, repeating the sentiments above.

== Present day ==
=== Human rights ===
Article 18 of the Universal Declaration of Human Rights is designed to protect the right to freedom of thought, conscience, and religion. In 1993, the UN's human rights committee declared that article 18 of the International Covenant on Civil and Political Rights "protects theistic, non-theistic and atheistic beliefs, as well as the right not to profess any religion or belief". The committee further stated that "the freedom to have or to adopt a religion or belief necessarily entails the freedom to choose a religion or belief, including the right to replace one's current religion or belief with another or to adopt atheistic views". Signatories to the convention are barred from "the use of threat of physical force or penal sanctions to compel believers or non-believers" to recant their beliefs or convert. Despite this, atheists still are persecuted in some parts of the world. A global overview is provided by the Freedom of Thought Report produced by Humanists International, which assigns country ratings across multiple categories covering government, education, society and expression.

=== Western countries ===
Modern theories of constitutional democracy assume that citizens are intellectually and spiritually autonomous and that governments should leave matters of religious belief to individuals and not coerce religious beliefs using sanctions or benefits. The constitutions, human rights conventions and the religious liberty jurisprudence of most constitutional democracies provide legal protection of atheists and agnostics. In addition, freedom of expression provisions and legislation separating church from state also serve to protect the rights of atheists. As a result, open legal discrimination against atheists is not common in most Western countries. However, prejudice against atheists does exist in Western countries. A study showed that atheists had lower employment prospects.

==== Europe ====
In most of Europe, atheists are elected to office at high levels in many governments without controversy. Some atheist organizations in Europe have expressed concerns regarding issues of separation of church and state, such as administrative fees for leaving the Church charged in Germany, and sermons being organized by the Swedish parliament. Ireland requires religious training from Christian colleges in order to work as a teacher in government-funded schools. In the UK one-third of state-funded schools are faith-based. However, there are no restrictions on atheists holding public office. At least four Prime Ministers of the UK have been openly atheists, along with many other senior politicians across all the parties. According to a 2012 poll, 25% of the Turks in Germany believe atheists are inferior human beings. Portugal has elected two presidents, Mário Soares, who was also elected Prime-Minister, and Jorge Sampaio, who have openly expressed their irreligion, as well as two agnostic Prime-Ministers, José Sócrates and António Costa. On the contrary, in Greece, the right-wing New Democracy government stated that "the Greek people have a right to know whether Mr. Tsipras is an atheist", even though they granted that "it is his right." In the Elder Pastitsios case, a 27-year-old was sentenced to imprisonment for satirizing a popular apocalyptically-minded Greek Orthodox monk, while several metropolitans of the Greek Orthodox Church (which is not fully separated from the state) have also urged their flock "not to vote unbelievers into office", even going so far as to warn Greek Orthodox laymen that they would be "sinning if they voted atheists into public office."

==== Brazil ====
A 2009 survey showed that atheists were the most hated demographic group in Brazil, among several other minorities polled, being almost on par with drug addicts. According to the research, 17% of the interviewees stated they felt either hatred or repulsion for atheists, while 25% felt antipathy and 29% were indifferent.

==== Canada ====
Canadian secular humanist groups have worked to end the recitation of prayers during government proceedings, viewing them as discriminatory. Scouts Canada states that while a belief in God or affiliation with organized religion is not a requirement to join, members must have "a basic spiritual belief" and one of the core values is "Duty to God: Defined as, The responsibility to adhere to spiritual principles, and thus to the religion that expresses them, and to accept the duties therefrom."

==== United States ====
Anti-atheism was described as a "key pillar of American religious identity" from the early settlements to today's conspiracy ideologies. Discrimination against atheists in the United States occurs in legal, personal, social, and professional contexts. Many American atheists compare their situation to the discrimination faced by ethnic minorities, and LGBT communities. "Americans still feel it's acceptable to discriminate against atheists in ways considered beyond the pale for other groups," asserted Fred Edwords of the American Humanist Association. The degree of discrimination, persecution, and social stigma atheists face in the United States, compared to other persecuted groups in the United States has been the subject of study and a matter of debate.

In the United States, seven state constitutions include religious tests that would effectively prevent atheists from holding public office, and in some cases being a juror/witness, though these have not generally been enforced since the early twentieth century. The U.S. Constitution permits an affirmation in place of an oath to allow atheists to give testimony in court or to hold public office. However, the Supreme Court case Torcaso v. Watkins (1961) reaffirmed that the U.S. Constitution prohibits states and the federal government from requiring any kind of religious test for public office, in this specific case as a notary public. This decision is generally understood to also apply to witness oaths.

Several American atheists have used court challenges to address discrimination against atheists. Michael Newdow challenged inclusion of the phrase "under God" in the United States Pledge of Allegiance on behalf of his daughter, claiming that the phrase amounted to government endorsement of discrimination against atheists. He won the case at an initial stage, but the Supreme Court dismissed his claim, ruling that Newdow did not have standing to bring his case, thus disposing of the case without ruling on the constitutionality of the pledge. Respondents to a survey were less likely to support a kidney transplant for hypothetical atheists and agnostics needing it, than for Christian patients with similar medical needs. As the Boy Scouts of America does not allow atheists as members, atheist families and the ACLU from the 1990s onwards have launched a series of court cases arguing discrimination against atheists. In response to ACLU lawsuits, the Pentagon in 2004 ended sponsorship of Scouting units, and in 2005 the BSA agreed to transfer all Scouting units out of government entities such as public schools.

Despite polling showing that nonbelievers make up an increasingly large part of the population there are only a few public atheists serving as public officials across the nation. Few politicians have been willing to acknowledge their lack of belief in supreme beings, since such revelations have been considered "political suicide", and some have identified themselves as atheists only after or towards the end of their terms in office. California Representative Pete Stark was the first openly atheist member of the United States Congress, publicly identifying himself as such in 2007 despite serving since 1973. With this announcement he became the highest ranking openly atheist elected official in the United States. Stark was defeated for reelection in the primary in 2012, the same year Jared Huffman was elected representative for a different California district. Huffman has since been the sole non-theist in the United States House of Representatives, describing himself as a humanist and stating "I suppose you could say I don't believe in God" in a 2017 interview with The Washington Post's Michelle Boorstein.

It is thought that for years, there was only one openly atheist state legislator, Ernie Chambers, who held a seat in the Nebraska State Legislature from 1971 to 2009, and again from 2013 to 2021. During the 2010s, some other members of state legislatures have publicly identified themselves as atheists including Juan Mendez of Arizona, Andrew Zwicker of New Jersey, and Megan Hunt of Nebraska. Cecil Bothwell, who has publicly stated he does not believe in gods and that it is "certainly not relevant to public office", was elected on 3 November 2009, to the Asheville, North Carolina city council after he won the third highest number of votes in the city election. Following the election, political opponents of Bothwell threatened to challenge his election on the grounds that the North Carolina Constitution does not allow for atheists to hold public office in the state. However, that provision, dating back to 1868, is unenforceable and invalid because the United States Constitution prevents religious tests for public office. A 2015 Gallup survey found that 40% of Americans would not vote an atheist for president, and in polls prior to 2015, that number had reached about 50%.

A 2014 study by the University of Minnesota found that 42% of respondents characterized atheists as a group that did "not at all agree with my vision of American society", and that 44% would not want their child to marry an atheist. The negative attitudes towards atheists were higher than negative attitudes towards African-Americans and homosexuals but lower than the negative attitudes towards Muslims. Many in the U.S. associate atheism with immorality, including criminal behaviour, extreme materialism, communism and elitism. The studies also showed that rejection of atheists was related to the respondent's lack of exposure to diversity, education and political orientations. Atheists and atheist organizations have alleged discrimination against atheists in the military, and recently, with the development of the Army's Comprehensive Soldier Fitness program, atheists have alleged institutionalized discrimination. In several child custody court rulings, atheist parents have been discriminated against, either directly or indirectly. As child custody laws in the United States are often based on the subjective opinion of family court judges, atheism has frequently been used to deny custody to non-religious parents on the basis that a parent's lack of faith displays a lack of morality required to raise a child.

Prominent atheists and atheist groups have said that discrimination against atheists is illustrated by a statement reportedly made by George H. W. Bush during a public press conference just after announcing his candidacy for the presidency in 1987. When asked by journalist Robert Sherman about the equal citizenship and patriotism of American atheists, Sherman reported that Bush answered, "No, I don't know that atheists should be regarded as citizens, nor should they be regarded as patriotic. This is one nation under God." Sherman did not tape the exchange and no other newspaper ran a story on it at the time.

George H. W. Bush's son, George W. Bush, responded to a question about the role of faith in his presidency during a 3 November 2004 press conference, "I will be your president regardless of your faith. And I don't expect you to agree with me, necessarily, on religion. As a matter of fact, no president should ever try to impose religion on our society. The great – the great tradition of America is one where people can worship the – the way they want to worship. And if they choose not to worship, they're just as patriotic as your neighbor."

On 16 December 2016, President Barack Obama signed H.R. 1150, an amendment to the Frank R. Wolf International Religious Freedom Act. It includes protections for "non-theistic beliefs, as well as the right not to profess or practice any religion at all."

Torcaso v. Watkins, 367 U.S. 488 (1961) was a United States Supreme Court case in which the court reaffirmed that the United States Constitution prohibits States and the Federal Government from requiring any kind of religious test for public office; the specific case with Torcaso was regarding his being an atheist and his work as a notary public.

The constitutions of seven U.S. states ban atheists from holding public office. However, these laws are unenforceable due to conflicting with the First Amendment and Article VI of the United States Constitution:

Arkansas
Article 19, Section 1
"No person who denies the being of a God shall hold any office in the civil departments of this State, nor be competent to testify as a witness in any Court."
Maryland
Article 37
"That no religious test ought ever to be required as a qualification for any office of profit or trust in this State, other than a declaration of belief in the existence of God; nor shall the Legislature prescribe any other oath of office than the oath prescribed by this Constitution."
Mississippi
Article 14, Section 265
"No person who denies the existence of a Supreme Being shall hold any office in this state."
North Carolina
Article 6, Section 8
"The following persons shall be disqualified for office: First, any person who shall deny the being of Almighty God."
South Carolina
Article 17, Section 4
"No person who denies the existence of a Supreme Being shall hold any office under this Constitution."
Tennessee
Article 9, Section 2
"No person who denies the being of God, or a future state of rewards and punishments, shall hold any office in the civil department of this state."
Texas
Article 1, Section 4
"No religious test shall ever be required as a qualification to any office, or public trust, in this State; nor shall any one be excluded from holding office on account of his religious sentiments, provided he acknowledge the existence of a Supreme Being."

An eighth state constitution affords special protection to theists.

Pennsylvania
Article 1, Section 4
"No person who acknowledges the being of a God and a future state of rewards and punishments shall, on account of his religious sentiments, be disqualified to hold any office or place of trust or profit under this Commonwealth."

=== Other countries ===
Atheists, and those accused of defection from the official religion, may be subject to discrimination and persecution in many Muslim-majority countries. According to the Humanists International, compared to other nations, 12 countries in Africa, 9 in Asia, and 10 in the Middle East, were given the worst rating for committing "Grave Violations". Atheists and religious skeptics can be executed in at least thirteen nations: Afghanistan, Iran, Brunei, Maldives, Mauritania, Nigeria, Pakistan, Qatar, Saudi Arabia, Somalia, Libya, the United Arab Emirates and Yemen.

According to the most common interpretations of Islam, Muslims are not free to change religion or become an atheist. Leaving Islam and thus becoming an apostate is traditionally punished by death for men and by life imprisonment for women. The death penalty for apostasy is apparent in a range of Islamic states, including Iran, Egypt, Pakistan, Somalia, United Arab Emirates, Qatar, Yemen and Saudi Arabia. Although there have been no recently reported executions in Saudi Arabia, a judge in Saudi Arabia has recently recommended that imprisoned blogger Raif Badawi go before a high court on a charge of apostasy, which would carry the death penalty upon conviction. While a death sentence is rare, it is common for atheists to be charged with blasphemy or inciting hatred. New "Arab Spring" regimes in Tunisia and Egypt have jailed several outspoken atheists.

Since an apostate can be considered a Muslim whose beliefs cast doubt on the Divine, and/or Qur'an, claims of atheism and apostasy have been made against Muslim scholars and political opponents throughout history. Both fundamentalists and moderates agree that "blasphemers will not be forgiven" although they disagree on the severity of an appropriate punishment. In northwestern Syria in 2013 during the Syrian Civil War, jihadists beheaded and defaced a sculpture of Al-Maʿarri (973–1058 CE), one of several outspoken Arab and Persian anti-religious intellectuals who lived and taught during the Islamic Golden Age.

Jordan requires atheists to associate themselves with a recognized religion for official identification purposes. In Egypt, intellectuals suspected of holding atheistic beliefs have been prosecuted by judicial and religious authorities. Novelist Alaa Hamad was convicted of publishing a book that contained atheistic ideas and apostasy that were considered to threaten national unity and social peace.

==== Algeria ====
The study of Islam is a requirement in public and private schools for every Algerian child, irrespective of their religion.

Atheist or agnostic men are prohibited from marrying Muslim women (Algerian Family Code I.II.31). A marriage is legally nullified by the apostasy of the husband (presumably from Islam, although this is not specified; Family Code I.III.33). Atheists and agnostics cannot inherit (Family Code III.I.138).

==== Bangladesh ====
The Constitution of Bangladesh ensures secularism and right to religious freedom. Yet, the controversial Digital Security Act (DSA), passed in 2018, provides provisions against blasphemous expressions:

Article 28, Section 1
"If any person or group willingly or knowingly publishes or broadcasts or causes to publish or broadcast anything in website or any electronic format which hurts religious sentiment or values, with an intention to hurt or provoke the religious values or sentiments, then such act of the person shall be an offence."

The penalty under Section 2 and 3 of Article 28 of the Digital Security Act is a term of imprisonment not exceeding 5 years or a fine of BDT 1 million, or both. A person who commits the same offense several times is subject to imprisonment for up to 10 years or a "fine not exceeding Taka 20 lac (BDT 2 Million), or with both." Allegedly, DSA is being used to prosecute any person for atheistic remarks.

==== India ====
Sanal Edamaruku, atheist and the founder-president of Rationalist International, had to flee India in 2012, when the Catholic Secular Forum pressed charges against him under Section 295(A) of the Indian Penal Code, which penalises outraging the religious sentiments of any citizen. He is currently in self-exile in Finland to avoid arrest and indefinite jail time.

==== Indonesia ====
Jess Melvin argues that atheists were victims of genocide under the legal definition of the term during the 1965–66 Anti-PKI extermination campaign (PKI were the Communist Party of Indonesia) as the Indonesian Army called for the destruction of "atheist" and "unbelievers" collectively for their association with communism and, according to Matthew Lippmann and David Nersessian, atheists are covered as a protected group in the genocide convention under "religious group."

Atheists in Indonesia experience official discrimination in the context of registration of births and marriages, and the issuance of identity cards. In 2012, Indonesian atheist Alexander Aan was beaten by a mob, lost his job as a civil servant and was sentenced to two and a half years in jail for expressing his views online. However no law criminalizes, prohibits atheism and atheists except in Aceh.

==== Iran ====
Since atheism is not a belief nor a religion, non-believers are not given legal status in Iran. Declaration of faith in Islam, Christianity, Judaism or Zoroastrianism is required to avail of certain rights such as applying for entrance to university, or becoming a lawyer, with the position of judge reserved for Muslims (and men) only. The Penal Code is also based upon the religious affiliation of the victim and perpetrator, with the punishment oftentimes more severe on non-Muslims. Numerous writers, thinkers and philanthropists have been accused of apostasy and sentenced to death for questioning the prevailing interpretation of Islam in Iran. The Iranian Atheists Association was established in 2013 to form a platform for Iranian atheists to start debates and to question the current Islamic regime's attitude towards atheists, apostasy, and human rights.

According to Nasiri and Faghfouri Azar, the religious nature of the accusations against dissidents during the massacres, along with the systematic establishment of ad hoc religious tribunals (Islamic Revolutionary Courts) across the country, strongly suggests that the Islamic regime had a deliberate intent to eliminate groups it perceived as anti-Islamic, including the PMOI, Marxists, communists, and other political organisations with non-theistic ideologies. In a landmark UN report from July 2024, The UN Special Rapporteur on the Human Rights Situation in Iran characterised the atrocities committed in 1981 and 1982 as the crime of genocide and crimes against humanities and called for "the establishment of an international accountability mechanism to ensure prompt, impartial, thorough and transparent criminal investigations".

Similarly, Nasiri observes that more than ninety percent of the victims came from the Mojahedin and various Marxist groups. After a series of decrees and statements from Khomeini and other high-ranking clerics, these dissidents were labeled religious outlaws. Marxists, because of their atheistic or non-theistic beliefs, were broadly classified as “apostate” (murtad) or “atheist” (mulhid) communists. Between 1980 and 1983, Khomeini issued multiple decrees and fatwās targeting communists, identifying them as infidels (kafir) and apostate “mini-groups” (gorouhak-haye murtad). The Mojahedin were categorized as Munafiqin, an anti-Islam faction threatening both Islam and clerical authority. Based on these religious classifications, supporters of the Mojahedin and Marxist groups were subjected to systematic extermination. According to Nasiri and Rehman, the explicit theological rationale behind official decrees supporting these killings provide grounds for interpreting them as acts of religious genocide.

==== Saudi Arabia ====
Atheism is prohibited in Saudi Arabia and can come with a death penalty, if one is charged as an atheist.

In March 2014, the Saudi interior ministry issued a royal decree branding all atheists as terrorists, which defines terrorism as "calling for atheist thought in any form, or calling into question the fundamentals of the Islamic religion on which this country is based".

==== Turkey ====
Although officially a secular state, the vast majority of Turks are Muslim, and the state grants some special privileges to Muslims and to Islam in the media and private religious institutions.

=== Organizations ===
Regular Freemasonry insists, among other things, that a volume of scripture is open in a working lodge, that every member profess belief in a Supreme Being, and that the discussion of religion is banned. Continental Freemasonry is now the general term for the "liberal" jurisdictions which have removed some, or all, of these restrictions.

"Duty to God" is a principle of Scouting worldwide, though it is applied differently in different countries. The Boy Scouts of America (BSA) takes a strong position, excluding atheists and agnostics, while the Girl Scouts of the USA takes a more neutral position. The United Kingdom Scout Association has recently published alternative promises for people of different or no religion, specifying "Atheists, Humanists and people of no specific religion", who make a promise to uphold Scouting values rather than a duty to God. Scouts Canada defines Duty to God broadly in terms of "adherence to spiritual principles" and does not require members to be part of an organized religion, but does require that they have some form of "personal spirituality". In other countries, especially in Europe, some Scouting organizations may be secularist or religiously neutral (such as Eclaireuses et Eclaireurs de France, Corpo Nazionale Giovani Esploratori ed Esploratrici Italiani and the Baden-Powell Service Association in the United States).

== See also ==
- American Atheists – Atheism activist organization
- American Humanist Association – US secularist advocacy organization
- Atheist Bus Campaign – Bus ad campaign that started in Great Britain
- Atheist Centre – Atheist organization in India
- Boy Scouts of America membership controversies
- Center for Inquiry – American nonprofit advocacy group
- Freedom From Religion Foundation – American nonprofit organization
- International Humanist and Ethical Union – Secular humanism advocacy organization
- McCarthyism – Phenomenon of US political rhetoric after WWII
- Military Association of Atheists and Freethinkers
- Out Campaign – Public awareness initiative for freethought and atheism
- History of Christian thought on persecution and tolerance – Development of Christian thought in the West
- Religious discrimination – Treating a person or group differently because of their religious beliefs
- Religious nationalism – Relationship between national identity and religion
- Religious persecution – Persecution based on religious belief
- Richard Dawkins Foundation for Reason and Science – Non-profit organization
- Secular Coalition for America – American advocacy group
- Secularism – Position that religion should not influence civic and state affairs
- Secularization – Societal transition away from religion
- Theism – Belief in God or gods
