= Religious qualifications for public office in the United States =

States that have religious qualifications for public office written in their constitutions States that do not have religious qualifications for public office written in their constitutions

Religious qualifications for public office in the United States have always been prohibited at the national level of the federal system of government under the Constitution. Article VI of the Constitution of the United States declares that "no religious test shall ever be required as a qualification to any office or public trust under the United States". The First Amendment of the Constitution also prevents the Congress of the United States from making any law "respecting an establishment of religion" (the Establishment Clause).

Neither the First Amendment nor Article VI, however, were originally applied to the individual states, and individual restrictions were utilized by individual states to prevent Jews, Catholics, and atheists from occupying public offices. State-level requirements for public office were not entirely abolished until 1961, when the Supreme Court of the United States struck down religious qualifications for all public officeholders in its decision in Torcaso v. Watkins, a case concerning an atheist's right to serve as a notary public under a Maryland law requiring public officials to declare they believed in God. However, eight states still have language in their constitutions that requires such qualifications.

== History ==
=== Colonial period ===
The history of religious qualifications for public office in the United States dates back to the British colonial period. The history of anti-Semitism in Europe dates back to Roman times. The Jews were expelled from England when King Edward I issued the Edict of Expulsion of 1290. While some returned once Lord Protector Oliver Cromwell encouraged Jews to return to Britain in the 1650s, they remained a discriminated minority within the United Kingdom. England experienced multiple waves of strong anti-Catholicism after the Reformation, and the Anglican faith became the state religion of the English Kingdom after supplanting a period of Catholicism. Ruled by the British Empire until 1776, colonial America was dominated by English political and religious influence. In Maryland, Anglicanism was established as the official religion from 1702. The colony's Catholic subjects were barred from both voting and holding public office, although the right to worship privately was granted in 1712.

=== After independence ===
Religious requirements for political office in the United States were unconstitutional on the national level of the federal system of government established by the Constitution of the United States since the ratification of the articles of the Constitution in 1788. The No Religious Test Clause of Article VI of the Constitution expressly stated that "no religious test shall ever be required as a qualification to any office or public trust under the United States". Additionally, the Establishment Clause of the First Amendment of the United States Constitution, explicitly prohibiting the Congress of the United States from making any law "respecting an establishment of religion", was ratified as part of the Bill of Rights only a few years later. Neither protected the civil rights safeguarded by the Constitution from the authorities of the individual states of the United States, as the Constitution was only deemed to apply to the central government of the country. The state governments were therefore able to legally exclude persons from holding public offices on religious grounds.

As a result of the incorporation of the Bill of Rights after the American Civil War, the protections of the Bill of Rights were extended to the individual states on the basis of the Due Process Clause of the Fourteenth Amendment to the Constitution.

State requirements for political office were not entirely abolished until 1961, when the Supreme Court of the United States rejected a provision of the Maryland State Constitution requiring all public officeholders to declare a belief in God in the case of Torcaso v. Watkins. Roy Torcaso, an atheist, had filed suit in Maryland to establish his right to become a notary public without swearing his belief in God, as demanded by the Maryland Constitution. After being rebuffed, Torcaso went to the Supreme Court, which ruled unanimously that the state's religious restriction was invalid as a violation of guaranteed constitutional rights.

Although the Torcaso decision dismissed enforcement of religious requirements for office as unconstitutional in the United States, antiquated provisions barring atheists from occupying political offices were not immediately stricken from state legislation. As a result, a number of lawsuits were initiated after 1961 to secure the right to hold public office without conforming to religious requirements. These cases followed the United States Supreme Court's precedent.

In 1997, the Supreme Court of South Carolina decided the case of Silverman v. Campbell, likewise following the Supreme Court ruling in Torcaso v. Watkins. The court held that Article VI, section 2 of the South Carolina State Constitution ("No person who denies the existence of the Supreme Being shall hold any office under this Constitution") and Article XVII, section 4 ("No person who denies the existence of a Supreme Being shall hold any office under this Constitution") could not be enforced as articles in conflict with the Constitution of the United States.

== See also ==
- Separation of church and state in the United States
- Religious discrimination in the United States
- Law for the Restoration of the Professional Civil Service: Legislation depriving Jews of the right to hold public offices in Nazi Germany.
- Vichy laws on the status of Jews: Legislation depriving Jews of the right to hold public office in Vichy France.
