= Oath or Affirmation Clause =

Oath or Affirmation Clause may refer to the following clauses of the United States Constitution:

- The Presidential Oath or Affirmation Clause, Article II, Section 1, Clause 8
- The General Oath or Affirmation Clause, Article VI, Clause 3

It may also refer to the following clauses of the Constitution that reference the taking of an oath or affirmation:

- The Trial of Impeachment Clause, Article I, Section 3, Clause 6
- The Warrants Clause, Fourth Amendment
