= Torcaso v. Watkins =

- Supreme Court of the United States

Argued April 24, 1961 Decided June 19, 1961
- Full case name: Torcaso v. Watkins, Clerk
- Citations: 367 U.S. 488 (more) 81 S.Ct. 1680, 6 L. Ed. 2d 982
- Argument: Oral argument

Case history
- Prior: Judgment for respondent, Circuit Court for Montgomery County, Maryland; Judgment affirmed, Court of Appeals of Maryland, 223 Md. 49, 162 A. 2d 438 (1960)
- Subsequent: Reversed and remanded

Holding
- The First Amendment to the United States Constitution, as applied through the Fourteenth Amendment, prohibits state governments from requiring a religious test for public office.

Court membership
- Chief Justice Earl Warren Associate Justices Hugo Black · Felix Frankfurter; William O. Douglas · Tom C. Clark; John M. Harlan II · William J. Brennan Jr. Charles E. Whittaker · Potter Stewart

Case opinions
- Majority: Black, joined by Warren, Douglas, Clark, Brennan, Whittaker, Stewart
- Concurrence: Frankfurter (in the result, no opinion)
- Concurrence: Harlan (in the result, no opinion)

Laws applied
- U.S. Constitution Amendments I, XIV

Torcaso v. Watkins, 367 U.S. 488 (1961), was a landmark United States Supreme Court case in which the Court reaffirmed that the United States Constitution prohibits states and the federal government from requiring any kind of religious test for public office, in this case as a notary public.

== Background ==
In the early 1960s, the Governor of Maryland appointed Roy Torcaso (November 13, 1910 – June 9, 2007) as a notary public. At the time, the Constitution of Maryland required "a declaration of belief in the existence of God" for a person to hold "any office of profit or trust in this State".

Torcaso, an atheist, refused to make such a statement, and his appointment was consequently revoked. Torcaso, believing his constitutional rights to freedom of religious expression had been infringed, filed suit in a Maryland Circuit Court. The Circuit Court rejected his claim, and the Maryland Court of Appeals held that the requirement in the Maryland Constitution for a declaration of belief in God as a qualification for office was self-executing and did not require any implementing legislation to be enacted by the state legislature.

The Court of Appeals justified its decision thus:

The petitioner is not compelled to believe or disbelieve, under threat of punishment or other compulsion. True, unless he makes the declaration of belief, he cannot hold public office in Maryland, but he is not compelled to hold office.

Torcaso took the matter to the United States Supreme Court, which heard oral argument on April 24, 1961.

== Decision ==
States that have religious qualifications for public office written in their constitutions States that do not have religious qualifications for public office written in their constitutions

The Court unanimously found that Maryland's requirement for a person holding public office to state a belief in God violated the First and Fourteenth Amendments to the United States Constitution.

The Court had established in Everson v. Board of Education (1947) that:

The "establishment of religion" clause of the First Amendment means at least this: Neither a state nor the Federal Government can set up a church. Neither can pass laws which aid one religion, aid all religions, or prefer one religion over another. Neither can force nor influence a person to go to or to remain away from church against his will or force him to profess a belief or disbelief in any religion.

Writing for the Court in Torcaso, Justice Hugo Black cited Everson v. Board of Education and applied the Everson holding:

There is, and can be, no dispute about the purpose or effect of the Maryland Declaration of Rights requirement before us — it sets up a religious test which was designed to and, if valid, does bar every person who refuses to declare a belief in God from holding a public "office of profit or trust" in Maryland.

...

We repeat and again reaffirm that neither a State nor the Federal Government can constitutionally force a person "to profess a belief or disbelief in any religion." Neither can constitutionally pass laws or impose requirements which aid all religions as against non-believers, and neither can aid those religions based on a belief in the existence of God as against those religions founded on different beliefs.

Rebuffing the judgment of the Maryland Court of Appeals, Justice Black added: "The fact, however, that a person is not compelled to hold public office cannot possibly be an excuse for barring him from office by state-imposed criteria forbidden by the Constitution."

The Court did not base its holding on the No Religious Test Clause of Article VI. In Footnote 1 of the opinion, Justice Black wrote:

Appellant also claimed that the State's test oath requirement violates the provision of Art. VI of the Federal Constitution that "no religious Test shall ever be required as a Qualification to any Office or public Trust under the United States." Because we are reversing the judgment on other grounds, we find it unnecessary to consider appellant's contention that this provision applies to state as well as federal offices.

== Secular humanism as a religion ==
Some religious groups have argued that in Torcaso the Supreme Court "found" secular humanism to be a religion. This assertion is based on a reference, by Justice Black in footnote 11 of the Court's opinion, to court cases where organized groups of self-identified humanists, or ethicists, meeting on a regular basis to share and celebrate their beliefs, were granted religious-based tax exemptions. Religious groups such as those supporting causes such as teaching creationism in schools have seized upon Justice Black's use of the term "secular humanism" in his footnote as a "finding" that any secular or evolution-based activity is a religion under US law.

== See also ==
- Religious qualifications for public office in the United States
- Bernal v. Fainter (restriction on noncitizens being notaries found unconstitutional)
- Silverman v. Campbell (a similar case in the South Carolina Supreme Court)
- List of United States Supreme Court cases, volume 367
- Secular humanism
