= Religious discrimination =

Treating a person or group differently because of their religious beliefs

Religious discrimination is treating a person or group differently because of the particular religion they align with or were born into (hereditary). This includes instances when adherents of different religions, denominations or non-religions are treated unequally due to their particular beliefs, either by the law or in institutional settings, such as employment or housing.

Religious discrimination or bias is related to religious persecution, the most extreme forms of which would include instances in which people have been executed for beliefs that have been perceived to be heretical. Laws that only carry light punishments are described as mild forms of religious persecution or religious discrimination. In recent years, terms such as religism and religionism have also been used, but "religious discrimination" remains the more widely used term.

Even in societies where freedom of religion is a constitutional right, adherents of minority religions sometimes voice their concerns about religious discrimination against them. Insofar as legal policies are concerned, cases that are perceived to be cases of religious discrimination might be the result of interference in the religious sphere by other spheres of the public that are regulated by law.

== History ==
=== Ancient ===
Jews faced religious discrimination in the Roman Empire. The low point was the expulsion of Jews from Jerusalem and subsequent paganization of the city during the reign of Emperor Hadrian (117–138 AD), which led to the Jewish diaspora.

Persecution of Christians in the Roman Empire was widespread. Christianity threatened the polytheistic order of the Roman Empire because of the importance of evangelism in Christianity. Under the Neronian persecution, Rome began to discriminate against monotheists who refused to worship the Roman gods. Nero blamed Christians for the Great Fire of Rome (64 AD). During the Decian persecution, Valerianic persecution, and Diocletianic Persecution, Christians were slaughtered by being thrown to wild beasts, churches were destroyed, priests were imprisoned, and scriptures were confiscated.

Religious discrimination against Christians ended with the Edict of Milan (313 AD), and the Edict of Thessalonica (380 AD) made Christianity the official religion of the empire. By the 5th century Christianity became the dominant religion in Europe and took a reversed role, discriminating against pagans, heretics, and Jews.

=== Medieval ===
Expulsions of Jews in Europe from 1100 to 1600

In the Middle Ages, antisemitism in Europe was widespread. Christians accused Jews of Jewish deicide, blood libel, and well poisoning, and subjected them to expulsions, forced conversions, and mandatory sermons. In the Papal States, Jews were required to live in segregated neighbourhoods called ghettos. Historians note that religious discrimination against Jews tended to increase during negative economic and climatic shocks in Europe, such as when they were scapegoated for causing the Black Death.

During the Islamic Golden Age, many Jewish, Christian, Zoroastrian, and Pagan lands came under Muslim rule. As People of the Book, Jews, Christians, and Mandaeans living under Muslim rule became dhimmis with social status inferior to that of Muslims. Although Sharia law granted dhimmis freedom of religion, they were subjected to religious discrimination as second-class citizens and had to pay a jizya tax. They could not proselytize Muslims, marry Muslims (in the case of dhimmi men), build or repair churches and synagogues without permission, perform loud religious rituals such as the ringing of church bells, carry weapons, or ride horses and camels. These discriminatory laws forced many Christians into poverty and slavery.

During the First Crusade (1096), Christian knights recaptured the Holy Land from Muslim rule, massacring most of the Muslims and Jews in Jerusalem. This led to the creation of Catholic-ruled Crusader states, most notably the Kingdom of Jerusalem. In these kingdoms Jews, Muslims, and Orthodox Christians had no rights, being considered property of the crusader lords.

=== Modern ===
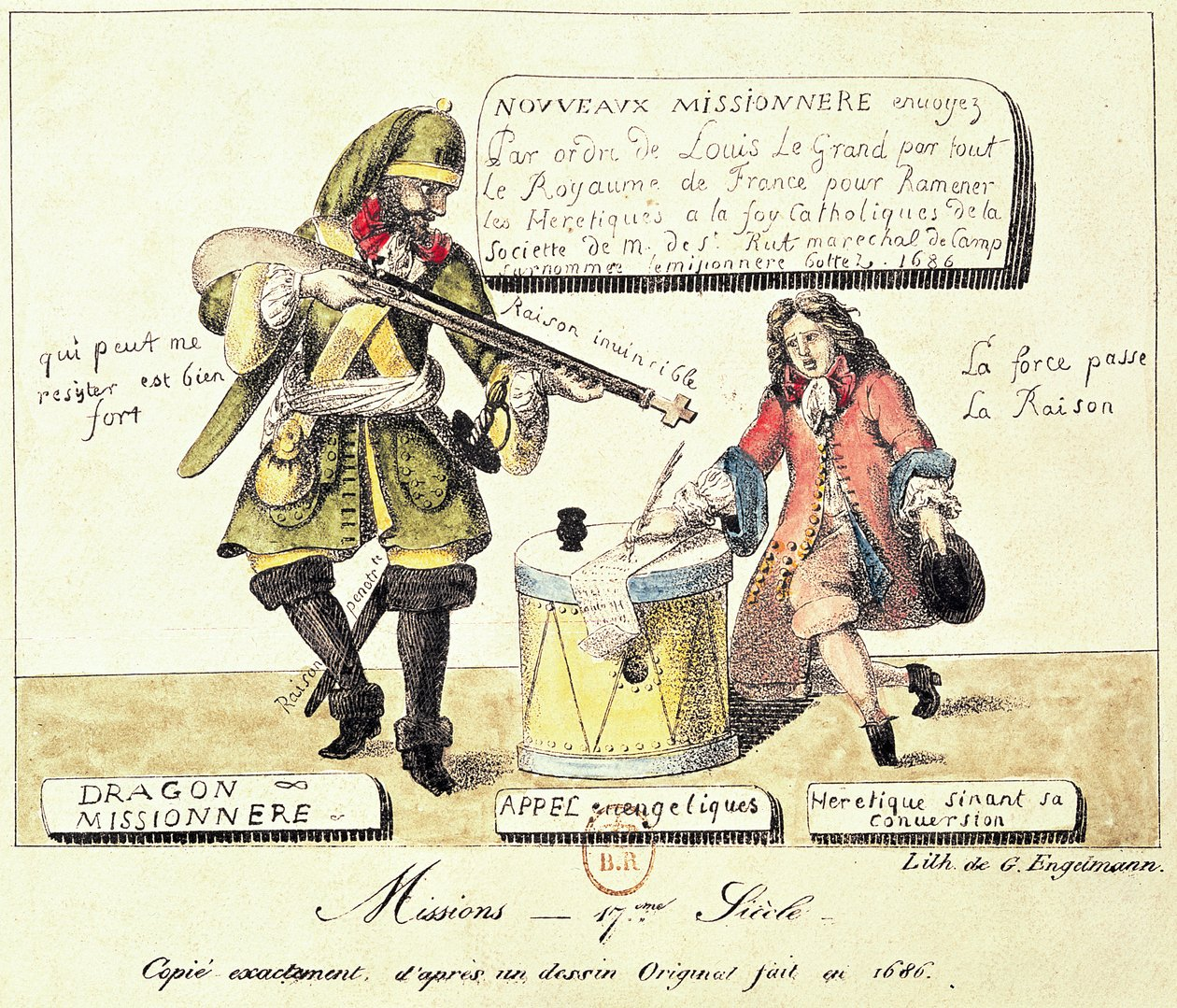
Protestant political cartoon satirising the Dragonnades in France

In early modern Europe, there was a religious conflict between Catholics and Protestants taking place in many countries. In early modern Britain, the Act of Uniformity 1548 compelled the Church of England to use only the Book of Common Prayer for its liturgy. There were several other Acts of Uniformity as the conflict continued well into the 19th century. When Catholicism became the sole compulsory religion in early modern France during the reign of Louis XIV, the Huguenots had to leave the country en masse.

The Act for the Settlement of Ireland 1652 barred Catholics from most public offices and confiscated large amounts of their land, much of which was given to Protestant settlers.

During the decline of the Ottoman Empire in the late modern period, particularly ever since the Great Turkish War (1683), discrimination against religious minorities worsened. The destruction of churches and the expulsion of local Christian communities became commonplace. Tolerance policies were abandoned in Ottoman Albania, in favor of reducing the size of Albania's Catholic population through Islamization.

Antisemitism in the Russian Empire was widespread, as Imperial Russia contained the world's largest Jewish population at the time. Jews were subject to discriminatory laws such as the May Laws (1882), which restricted them from certain locations, jobs, transactions, schools, and political positions. They were also targeted in frequent anti-Jewish riots, called pogroms.

== In Asia ==
=== Pakistan ===
Religious discrimination in Pakistan is a serious issue. Several incidents of discrimination have been recorded with some finding support by the state itself. In a case of constitutionally sanctioned religious discrimination, non-Muslims in Pakistan cannot become prime minister or president, even if they are Pakistani citizens. Pakistan's Blasphemy Law, according to critics, "is overwhelmingly being used to persecute religious minorities and settle personal vendettas". Ahmadiyya Muslims have been subject to significant persecution and are sometimes declared 'non-Muslims'.

=== China ===
Uyghurs or Uighurs are an ethnic and religious minority group in China. Their identity is based on the Islamic religion and has roots in the former East Turkistan culture. They reside in Xinjiang, an autonomous region situated in the west of the country. This group is persecuted by the Chinese government due to its perceived threat to the nation's security and identity. The Chinese government believes that the Uyghurs have separatist, extremist, and terrorist thoughts. It has detained around one million Uyghurs in camps. According to the Chinese government, these camps are created to re-educate the minority Muslims by learning about the negative consequences of extremism. Detainees are punished in these camps. The treatment of the Uyghurs violates their human rights because they are forcibly sent to the camps for an indefinite period of time. The discrimination against the Uyghurs comes in many forms. Some apparent restrictions include banning religious veils or robes in public. The training camps serve to inculcate beliefs that are congruent with the beliefs of the Chinese Communist Party. Subjected to abuse and suppression in China, some Uyghurs who were seeking refuge resettled in different parts of the world. In June 2021, it was reported that the Uyghurs were being detained even outside China. Following the diplomatic relations of China with the UAE, Uyghurs living in Dubai were subjected to arrest, prolonged detention and deportation to China. China allegedly requested for the deportation of Uyghurs from three Arab countries, including the UAE. The global influence of Beijing has even resulted in the expansion of religious discrimination against the Uyghur Muslims who are residing abroad.

=== India ===
Although the Constitution of India prohibits discrimination based on religion discrimination and religious violence in India are frequent, sometimes even involving the function of government. For example dalit people who are not Hindu, Sikh, or Buddhist are not covered by the Scheduled Castes laws and hence dalit Christians and Muslims do not receive the affirmative action political representation and educational placement, welfare benefits, and hate crimes protections accorded to their fellows. Dalits worshipping the same gods as Hindus were previously considered to be of a different religion and in the early twentieth century the question "Is he a Hindu or Pariah?" had currency.

== In the Middle East ==
=== Algeria ===
Apostasy and proselytization is punishable by Algerian law. Prison sentences for those that practice Christianity do occur.

=== Egypt ===
Apostasy and proselytization

Violence against the Christian minority is common.

Coptic Christians face many barriers to building and renovating Coptic churches.

=== Iraq ===
Christian Assyrians in Iraq have suffered from discrimination since Saddam Hussein's Arabization policies in the 1980s.

=== Morocco ===
Apostasy and proselytization is punishable by Moroccan law. Prison sentences for those that leave Islam do occur.

=== Iran ===
Throughout the contemporary history of Iran, ethnic and religious minorities have experienced religious discrimination. Since most of the people of Iran follow the Shia religion, most of the official and unofficial laws of this country are influenced by the Shia religion.

Before the 1979 revolution, there were laws in Iran that allowed religious minorities to participate in elections, have representatives in the parliament, and even reach the highest government positions. After the revolution of 1979, the laws regarding religious minorities were changed. In the current constitution of Iran, only followers of Christianity, Judaism, Zoroastrianism and Sunnis are allowed to perform their religious ceremonies in private and they do not have the right to propagate and spread their religion in public places (proselytize).

Also, Iran's constitution does not recognize other religious minorities such as Baha'is, Buddhists, Hindus, and Atheists. Adherents of these belief systems are not allowed to express their beliefs, but they are deprived of their various rights, including working in government and non-government jobs, etc.

According to the current apostasy laws of Iran, no Muslim has the right to change his (or her) religion, and if he changes his religion, they can be punished by prison and execution. After the Islamic Revolution in 1979 until 2023, all important political and security posts and positions in the country have been assigned to the followers of the Shia religion.

Javid Rahman, the UN rapporteur on Iran affairs, criticized the violation of human rights in Iran at the 77th session of the UN General Assembly. He accused the Iranian government of always ignoring the rights of ethnic and religious minorities in the country and involving them in various judicial cases. In this report, he demanded the release of dissident prisoners and the recognition of the rights of religious and political minorities in Iran.

Kameel Ahmady, an anthropologist and developer of the book From Border to Border (a book about the situation of ethnic and religious minorities in Iran) and his colleagues believes that the legal discriminations in the country's laws regarding ethnic and religious minorities must be removed.

In economic terms, Sunni rural areas lack important infrastructure. It is believed that the majority of the country’s facilities are concentrated in the central provinces. In terms of culture, some ethnic and religious minorities believe that they face restrictions on holding regional festivals and conferences. The national and local media do not cover and represent the cultures and traditions of these regions as the people believe they deserve, and do not provide media services related to the local and regional cultures of Different religions groups. Most Baluchis, as well as some Kurds, have different religious orientations than the state’s official religion. These groups feel that the religious beliefs of government officials lead to the political, cultural, social and economic oppression of indigenous peoples.

== In Western countries ==
=== United States ===
Religious discrimination in the history of the United States dates back to the first Protestant Christian European settlers, composed mostly of English Puritans, during the British colonization of North America (16th century), directed both towards Native Americans and non-Protestant Roman Catholic European settlers. (See also Colonial history of the United States).

In a 1979 consultation on the issue, the United States Commission on Civil Rights defined religious discrimination in relation to the civil rights guaranteed by the Fourteenth Amendment to the United States Constitution. Whereas religious civil liberties, such as the right to hold or not to hold a religious belief, are essential for Freedom of Religion (in the United States secured by the First Amendment), religious discrimination occurs when someone is denied "the equal protection of the laws, equality of status under the law, equal treatment in the administration of justice, and equality of opportunity and access to employment, education, housing, public services and facilities, and public accommodation because they exercise their right to religious freedom".

=== Canada ===
In Canada, during 1995-1998, Newfoundland had only Christian schools (four of them, Pentecostal, Roman Catholic, Seventh-day Adventist, and inter-denominational (Anglican, Salvation Army and United Church)). The right to organize publicly supported religious schools was only given to certain Christian denominations, thus tax money was used to support a selected group of Christian denominations. The denominational schools could also refuse the admission of a student or the hiring of a qualified teacher on purely religious grounds. Quebec has used two school systems, one Protestant and the other Roman Catholic, but it seems this system will be replaced with two secular school systems: one French and the other English.

Ontario had two school systems going back before Confederation. The British North America Act (1867) gave the Provinces jurisdiction over education. Section 93 of the BNA Act offered constitutional protection for denominational schools as they existed in law at the time of Confederation. Like "Public schools", Catholic schools are fully funded from kindergarten to grade 12. However, profound demographic changes of the past few decades have made the province of Ontario a multicultural, multi-racial, and multi-religious society. The thought that one religious group is privileged to have schools funded from the public purse is often considered unacceptable in a pluralistic, multicultural, secular society. Although it's also true that the people who send their children to those schools have a form that directs their tax dollars to that school system.

Canadian faith-based university Trinity Western University (TWU) is currently facing a challenge from members of the legal and LGBT community to its freedom to educate students in a private university context while holding certain "religious values", such as the freedom to discriminate against other people, including requiring students to sign a chastity oath, and denying LGBT students the same rights as straight students. TWU faced a similar battle in 2001 (Trinity Western University v. British Columbia College of Teachers) where the Supreme Court of Canada ruled that TWU was capable to teach professional disciplines.

On 16 June 2019, Quebec banned public servants in positions of authority from wearing visible religious symbols. The legislation was erected with the goal of promoting neutrality. Prime Minister Trudeau argues that the ban goes against the fundamental rights of the Canadian people.

=== European Union ===
The Court of Justice of the European Union applies aspects of formal equality and substantive equality when evaluating religious discrimination.

==== Germany ====
Jewish emancipation in Europe

Scientologists in Germany face specific political and economic restrictions. They are barred from membership in some major political parties, and businesses and other employers use so-called "sect filters" to expose a prospective business partner's or employee's association with the organization. German federal and state interior ministers started a process aimed at banning Scientology in late 2007, but abandoned the initiative a year later, finding insufficient legal grounds. Despite this, polls suggest that most Germans favor banning Scientology altogether. The U.S. government has repeatedly raised concerns over discriminatory practices directed at individual Scientologists.

==== Greece ====
In Greece since the independence from the Muslim Ottomans rule in the 19th century, the Greek Orthodox Church has been given privileged status and only the Greek Orthodox church, Roman Catholic, some Protestant churches, Judaism and Islam are recognized religions. The Muslim minority alleges that Greece persistently and systematically discriminates against Muslims.

Recently, professor Nick Drydakis (Anglia Ruskin University) examined religious affiliation and employment bias in Athens, by implementing an experimental field study. Labor market outcomes (occupation access, entry wage, and wait time for call back) were assessed for three religious minorities (Pentecostal, evangelical, and Jehovah's Witnesses). Results indicate that religious minorities experience employment bias. Moreover, religious minorities face greater constraints on occupational access in more prestigious jobs compared to less prestigious jobs. Occupational access and entry wage bias is highest for religious minority women. In all cases, Jehovah's Witnesses face the greatest bias; female employers offered significantly lower entry wages to Jehovah's Witnesses than male employers.

=== Mexico ===
According to a Human Rights Practices report by the U.S. State department on Mexico note that "some local officials infringe on religious freedom, especially in the south". There is a conflict between Catholic/Mayan syncretists and Protestant evangelicals in the Chiapas region.

=== United Kingdom ===
Within the United Kingdom (UK), Northern Ireland has a long history of discrimination based on the religious and political affiliations of Roman Catholics (Nationalists) and Protestants (Loyalists). Some discrimination against Catholics was based on the idea that they were disloyal to the State. In a speech on 19 March 1935, Basil Brooke (Prime Minister of Northern Ireland (1943-1963)) spoke on the issue of employment based on religion: "I recommend those people who are loyalists not employ Roman Catholics, ninety-nine percent of whom are disloyal." In November 1934 the Prime Minister of Northern Ireland James Craig stated that his administration was a "Protestant Government for a Protestant People." Discrimination based on religion in Northern Ireland is alleged to have occurred in the areas of housing allocation, employment, voting rights, state benefits and with the Gerrymandering (or discriminatory Electoral boundary delimitation) to ensure election results.

An analysis of the 1,095 Northern Ireland government appointments in 1951 showed that Nationalists (comprising 34 percent of the population) received only 11.8 percent of positions in local government bodies: Borough, County, Urban and Rural District Councils. A system known as Plural voting provided for property owners to cast multiple votes in elections. Plural voting ended in the UK in 1948 but remained in effect in Northern Ireland until 1969. The Northern Ireland Civil Rights Association (NICRA) was founded in 1967. Several of the demands made by NICRA were for "One Man One Vote", the end of gerrymandering and discrimination based on religion.

== See also ==
- Antisemitism
- Anti-Christian sentiment
- Anti-Hindu sentiment
- List of anti-discrimination acts
- Civil and political rights
- Discrimination against atheists
- Islamophobia
- Normalization of antisemitism
- Persecution of Buddhists
- Persecution of Christians
- Persecution of Christians in the post–Cold War era
- Persecution of Jews
- Persecution of Hindus
- Persecution of Muslims
- Religious antisemitism
- Religious intolerance
- Religious persecution
- Religious segregation
- Religious violence
- Secularism
