= No Religious Test Clause =

Provision of the United States Constitution

The No Religious Test Clause of the United States Constitution is a clause within Article VI, Clause 3:

Senators and Representatives before mentioned, and the Members of the several State Legislatures, and all executive and judicial Officers, both of the United States and of the several States, shall be bound by Oath or Affirmation, to support this Constitution; but no religious Test shall ever be required as a Qualification to any Office or public Trust under the United States.

It immediately follows a clause requiring all federal and state office holders to take an oath or affirmation to support the Constitution. This clause contains the only explicit reference to religion in the original seven articles of the U.S. Constitution.

The ban on religious tests contained in this clause applies to all federal officeholders and employees as well as the officeholders of "State Legislatures, and [...] the several states". This clause is cited by advocates of separation of church and state as an example of the "original intent" of the Framers of the Constitution to avoid any entanglement between church and state, or involving the government in any way as a determiner of religious beliefs or practices. This is significant because this clause represents the words of the original Framers, even prior to the Establishment Clause of the First Amendment.

== Text ==
... ; but no religious test shall ever be required as a qualification to any office or public trust under the United States.

== Background ==
A variety of Test Acts were instituted in England in the 17th and 18th centuries. Their main purpose was to exclude anyone not a member of the Church of England—the official state religion—from holding government office, notably Catholics and "nonconforming" Protestants. Government officials were required to swear oaths, such as the Oath of Supremacy, that the monarch of England was the Supreme Governor of the Church of England and that they possessed no other foreign loyalties, such as to the pope. Later acts required officials to disavow transubstantiation and the veneration of saints. Such laws were common throughout Europe, where numerous countries had a state religion.

In many cases the colonial governments established an official religion, requiring residents to adhere to the beliefs of the founding sect. With the royal government's religious favoritism fresh in their memory, the Founders sought to prevent the return of the Test Acts by adding this clause to the Constitution. Specifically, Charles Pinckney, delegate from South Carolina—where a Protestant denomination was the established state religion—introduced the clause to Article VI, and it passed with little opposition.

== Forced oaths ==
The Supreme Court has interpreted this provision broadly, saying that any required oath to serve anything other than the Constitution is invalid. In the case of Ex parte Garland, the Court overturned a loyalty oath that the government had tried to apply to pardoned Confederate officials. As the officials had already received full presidential pardons (negating an argument based on their potential status as criminals), the Court ruled that forcing officials and judges to swear loyalty oaths was unconstitutional.

== State law ==
States that have religious qualifications for public office written in their constitutions States that do not have religious qualifications for public office written in their constitutions

Earlier in U.S. history, the doctrine of states' rights allowed individual states complete discretion regarding the inclusion of a religious test in their state constitutions. In 1961 such religious tests by the states were deemed to be unconstitutional by the extension of the First Amendment provisions to the states (via the incorporation of the 14th Amendment). In the 1961 case Torcaso v. Watkins, the U.S. Supreme Court unanimously ruled that such language in state constitutions was in violation of the First and Fourteenth Amendments to the United States Constitution. Citing the Supreme Court's interpretation of the Establishment Clause in Everson v. Board of Education and linking it to Torcaso v. Watkins, Justice Hugo Black stated for the Court:

We repeat and again reaffirm that neither a State nor the Federal Government can constitutionally force a person "to profess a belief or disbelief in any religion." Neither can constitutionally pass laws or impose requirements which aid all religions as against non-believers, and neither can aid those religions based on a belief in the existence of God as against those religions founded on different beliefs.

The Supreme Court did not rule on the applicability of Article VI, stating that "Because we are reversing the judgment on other grounds, we find it unnecessary to consider appellant's contention that this provision applies to state as well as federal offices."

Eight states include language in their constitutions either requiring state officeholders to have particular religious beliefs or specifically protecting those who do. However, the requirements are unenforceable because of the 1961 Supreme Court decision. The states are:

1. Arkansas (Article 19 Section 1)
2. Maryland (Declaration of Rights, Article 37)
3. Mississippi (Article 14, Section 265)
4. North Carolina (Article 6 Section 8)
5. Pennsylvania (Article 1 Section 4)
  Specifically protects officeholders with religious belief but is silent on whether those without such beliefs are also protected. The required beliefs include belief in a Supreme Being, and belief in a future state of rewards and punishments.
6. South Carolina (Article 17 Section 4)
7. Tennessee (Article 9 Section 2)
8. Texas (Article 1 Section 4)

Some of these same states also specify that the oath of office include the words "so help me God". In some cases, these beliefs (or oaths) were historically required also of jurors, witnesses in court, notaries public, and state employees. In the 1997 case of Silverman v. Campbell, the South Carolina Supreme Court ruled that the state constitution requiring an oath to God for employment in the public sector violated Article VI of the federal constitution, as well as the First and Fourteenth Amendments and therefore could not be enforced.

== See also ==
- Section 116 of the Constitution of Australia
