= Article Six of the United States Constitution =

Article Six of the United States Constitution establishes the laws and treaties of the United States made in accordance with it as the supreme law of the land, forbids a religious test as a requirement for holding a governmental position, and holds the United States under the Constitution responsible for debts incurred by the United States under the Articles of Confederation.

== Text ==
All Debts contracted and Engagements entered into, before the Adoption of this Constitution, shall be as valid against the United States under this Constitution, as under the Confederation.

This Constitution, and the Laws of the United States which shall be made in Pursuance thereof; and all Treaties made, or which shall be made, under the Authority of the United States, shall be the supreme Law of the Land; and the Judges in every State shall be bound thereby, any Thing in the Constitution or Laws of any State to the Contrary notwithstanding.

The Senators and Representatives before mentioned, and the Members of the several State Legislatures, and all executive and judicial Officers, both of the United States and of the several States, shall be bound by Oath or Affirmation, to support this Constitution; but no religious Test shall ever be Required as a Qualification To any Office or public Trust under the United States.

== Clauses ==
=== Debts ===
The first clause of the Article provides that debts contracted prior to the adoption of the Constitution remain valid, as they were under the Articles of Confederation.

=== Supremacy ===
Clause two provides that the Constitution, federal laws made pursuant to it, and treaties made under its authority constitute the supreme law of the land. It provides that state courts are bound by the supreme law; in case of conflict between federal and state law, the federal law must be applied. Even state constitutions are subordinate to federal law.

The Supreme Court under John Marshall (the Marshall Court) was influential in construing the supremacy clause. It first ruled that it had the power to review the decisions of state courts allegedly in conflict with the supreme law, claims of "state sovereignty" notwithstanding. In Martin v. Hunter's Lessee (1816), the Supreme Court confronted the Chief Justice of Virginia, Spencer Roane, who had previously declared a Supreme Court decision unconstitutional and refused to permit the state courts to abide by it. The Court upheld the Judiciary Act, which permitted it to hear appeals from state courts, on the grounds that Congress had passed it under the supremacy clause.

The Supreme Court has also struck down attempts by states to control or direct the affairs of federal institutions. McCulloch v. Maryland (1819) was a significant case in this regard. The state of Maryland had levied a tax on banks not chartered by the state; the tax applied, state judges ruled, to the Bank of the United States chartered by Congress in 1816. Marshall wrote that "the States have no power, by taxation or otherwise, to retard, impede, burden, or in any manner control, the operations of the constitutional laws enacted by Congress to carry into execution the powers vested in the general government." United States property is wholly immune to state taxation, as are government activities and institutions. Congress may explicitly provide immunity from taxation in certain cases, for instance by immunizing a federal contractor. Federal employees, however, may not be immunized from taxes, as the tax would not in any way impede government activities.

Gibbons v. Ogden (1824) was another influential case involving the supremacy clause. The state of New York had granted Aaron Ogden a monopoly over the steamboat business in the Hudson River. The other party, Thomas Gibbons, had obtained a federal permit under the Coastal Licensing Act to perform the same task. The Supreme Court upheld the federal permit. John Marshall wrote, "The nullity of an act, inconsistent with the Constitution, is produced by the declaration, that the Constitution is the supreme law. The appropriate application of that part of the clause which confers the same supremacy on laws and treaties, is to such acts of the State legislatures as do not transcend their powers, but though enacted in the execution of acknowledged State powers, interfere with, or are contrary to the laws of Congress, made in pursuance of the Constitution, or some treaty made under the authority of the United States. In every such case, the act of Congress, or the treaty, is supreme; and the law of the State, though enacted in the exercise of powers not controverted, must yield to it."

Reid v. Covert (1957) ruled that no branch of the United States Government can have powers conferred upon it by treaty that have not been conferred by the United States Constitution.

=== Oaths ===
Federal and state legislators, executive officers and judges are, by the third clause of the article, bound by oath or affirmation to support the Constitution. Congress may determine the form of such an oath. In Ex parte Garland (1866), the Supreme Court held that a test oath would violate the Constitution, so it invalidated the law requiring the following oath:

I, A. B., do solemnly swear (or affirm) that I have never voluntarily borne arms against the United States since I have been a citizen thereof; that I have voluntarily given no aid, countenance, counsel, or encouragement to persons engaged in armed hostility thereto; that I have neither sought nor accepted, not attempted to exercise the functions of any office whatever, under any authority or pretended authority in hostility to the United States; that I have not yielded a voluntary support to any pretended government, authority, power, or constitution with the United States, hostile or inimical thereto...

The Supreme Court found that the law constituted an unconstitutional ex post facto law, for it retroactively punished the offenses mentioned in the oath by preventing those who committed them from taking office.

Congress may not require religious tests for an office under the United States. Thus, Congress may include the customary words "so help me God" in an oath, but an individual would be under no compulsion to utter them, as such a requirement would constitute a religious test.

The current oath administered is as follows:

I, [name], do solemnly swear (or affirm) that I will support and defend the Constitution of the United States against all enemies, foreign and domestic; that I will bear true faith and allegiance to the same; that I take this obligation freely, without any mental reservation or purpose of evasion; and that I will well and faithfully discharge the duties of the office on which I am about to enter. [So help me God.]

During the 1960 presidential campaign, the issue of whether the nation would for the first time elect a Catholic to the highest office in the land raised the specter of an implicit, but no less effective, religious test. John F. Kennedy, in his address to the Greater Houston Ministerial Association on 12 September 1960, addressed the question directly, saying,

[N]either do I look with favor upon those who would work to subvert Article VI of the Constitution by requiring a religious test, even by indirection. For if they disagree with that safeguard, they should be openly working to repeal it.

... [C]ontrary to common newspaper usage, I am not the Catholic candidate for President.

I am the Democratic Party's candidate for President who happens also to be a Catholic.

I do not speak for my church on public matters; and the church does not speak for me. Whatever issue may come before me as President, if I should be elected, on birth control, divorce, censorship, gambling or any other subject, I will make my decision in accordance with these views – in accordance with what my conscience tells me to be in the national interest, and without regard to outside religious pressure or dictates. And no power or threat of punishment could cause me to decide otherwise.

But if the time should ever come – and I do not concede any conflict to be remotely possible – when my office would require me to either violate my conscience or violate the national interest, then I would resign the office; and I hope any other conscientious public servant would do likewise.

But I do not intend to apologize for these views to my critics of either Catholic or Protestant faith; nor do I intend to disavow either my views or my church in order to win this election.

If I should lose on the real issues, I shall return to my seat in the Senate, satisfied that I'd tried my best and was fairly judged.

But if this election is decided on the basis that 40 million Americans lost their chance of being President on the day they were baptized, then it is the whole nation that will be the loser, in the eyes of Catholics and non-Catholics around the world, in the eyes of history, and in the eyes of our own people.
