= List of Mormon fundamentalist leaders =

List of historical and current Mormon fundamentalist leaders

Mormon fundamentalist leaders are those who lead (or have led) a Mormon fundamentalist group.

== Early Mormon leaders ==
These leaders were the first three Presidents of the Church of the Church of Jesus Christ of Latter-day Saints (LDS Church):

- Joseph Smith (1830–44)
- Brigham Young (1847–77)
- John Taylor (1877–87)

Some Mormon fundamentalists also regard the next three LDS Church presidents as leaders:

- Wilford Woodruff (1887–1898)
- Lorenzo Snow (1898–1901)
- Joseph F. Smith (1901–1918)

== Major Mormon fundamentalist groups ==
After losing protracted legal battle with the Federal government regarding the legality of Plural Marriage (see Morrill Anti-Bigamy Act and Reynolds v. United States) the LDS Church issued the 1890 Manifesto prohibiting further polygymous marriages. The church began excommunicating members who practiced polygamy after the 1904 Second Manifesto, and Mormon fundamentalists began breaking away from the LDS Church.

At first, there was one main Mormon fundamentalist group, the Council of Friends, also known as the "Woolley group" and the "Priesthood Council". The Council of Friends was centered in Salt Lake City and the Short Creek Community, later called Colorado City, Arizona, and Hildale, Utah. The Council of Friends would ultimately split into four Mormon fundamentalist sects: the Latter Day Church of Christ (1935) located in Salt Lake City, Utah; the Apostolic United Brethren (1954), located in Bluffdale, Utah; the Fundamentalist Church of Jesus Christ of Latter-Day Saints (1954), located in Colorado City, Arizona, and Hildale, Utah; and the Kingston Group or the Davis County Cooperative Society. While some believe the LeBaron groups also broke away from the so-called "Priesthood Group," the LeBarons never were part of the Hildale/Colorado City movement. The Church of the Firstborn of the Fulness of Times, located in Chihuahua, Mexico claimed authority from Benjamin F. Johnson through Alma Dayer LeBaron.

=== Council of Friends and groups evolving from it ===
==== Pre-split Council of Friends leaders ====
The following are the leaders of the Council of Friends prior to its split:

- John W. Woolley (1918–28)
- Lorin C. Woolley (1928–34)
- J. Leslie Broadbent (1934–35)
- John Y. Barlow (1935–49)
- Joseph W. Musser (1949–54)
- Charles Zitting (1954)

==== Kingstons ====
Due to a succession conflict after J. Leslie Broadbent's death, Charles W. Kingston and Elden Kingston created a splinter group called the Latter Day Church of Christ, or the Kingston clan.

- Charles W. Kingston (supported leaders from 1935 until his death in 1975)
- Elden Kingston (1935–47)
- John Ortell Kingston (1947–87)
- Paul Elden Kingston (1987–)

==== Apostolic United Brethren ====
Joseph W. Musser ordained Rulon C. Allred into the Council of Friends. The Council refused to admit Allred; this resulted in a split, whereby followers of Allred became known as the Apostolic United Brethren. Musser ordained a new council, known as the 1952 New Priesthood Council. The line of succession of the AUB is as follows:

- Rulon C. Allred (1954–77)
- Owen A. Allred (1977–2005)
- J. LaMoine Jensen (2005–14)
- Lynn A. Thompson (2014–2021)
- David Watson (2021–)

==== Fundamentalist Church of Jesus Christ of Latter Day Saints ====
After the Short Creek community split it continued to thrive, and became known as the Fundamentalist Church of Jesus Christ of Latter Day Saints under Leroy S. Johnson. Its leaders include:

- LeRoy S. Johnson (1954–86)
- Rulon Jeffs (1986–2002)
- Warren Jeffs (leader) (2002 – present)
- Merril Jessop (de facto leader) (2007 – February 2011)

- Wendell L. Nielsen (legal president) (2010 – January 28, 2011)
- Helaman Jeffs (defacto leader) (~2020 – present)

==== Church of Jesus Christ (Original Doctrine) Inc. ====
The Church of Jesus Christ (Original Doctrine) Inc., was formed in September 2002 when FLDS Church president Warren Jeffs excommunicated Winston Blackmore; for two decades, Blackmore was bishop of the Bountiful, British Columbia group of the Fundamentalist Church of Jesus Christ of Latter Day Saints (FLDS Church). The community split nearly evenly—about 700 people continue to follow Blackmore, while about 500 follow Jeffs.

- Winston Blackmore (2002–present)

==== Centennial Park ("Second Ward") ====
Under Leroy Johnson's leadership, Marion Hammon and Alma Timpson were dismissed from the Short Creek community in 1983; they went on to create the Centennial Park group (or "Second Ward") in Centennial Park, Arizona. "Second Ward" distinguishes it from the FLDS Church, which is known as the "First Ward".

- J. Marion Hammon (1983–1988)
- Alma A. Timpson (1988–1997)
- John W. Timpson (1997–present)

==== The Church of Jesus Christ of Latter-day Saints and the Kingdom of God ====
This group (also known as the Nielsen/Naylor group) primarily resides in the Salt Lake Valley. It broke with the Centennial Park group after Marion Hammon died in 1988. Frank Naylor (apostle) and Ivan Neilsen (high priest and bishop) disagreed with Alma Timpson's leadership of Centennial Park, prompting them to create a new group known as the "Third Ward" with Naylor presiding; they likewise primarily reside in the Salt Lake Valley. They have formed a close association with Winston Blackmore's community of Bountiful, British Columbia.

- Frank Naylor (1990–1997)
- Ivan Nielsen (1997–2019)
- Current leadership unknown (2019–present)

==== Righteous Branch of the Church of Jesus Christ of Latter-day Saints ====
After the murder of Rulon C. Allred in 1977, Gerald Peterson, Sr proclaimed that Allred had bequeathed the priesthood to him. Peterson went on to found the Righteous Branch of the Church of Jesus Christ of Latter-day Saints the following year.

- Gerald Peterson, Sr. (1978–81)
- Gerald Peterson, Jr. (1981–2018)
- Michael Peterson (2018– )

=== Other Mormon fundamentalist groups ===
==== Church of the Firstborn of the Fulness of Times ====
The Church of the Firstborn of the Fulness of Times has its headquarters in northern Mexico. It was founded in 1955 by Joel LeBaron and members of his family. LeBaron claimed his priestly line of authority from his father Alma (who was ordained by Alma's grandfather Benjamin F. Johnson, who received the priesthood from Joseph Smith). The church exists in Chihuahua Mexico, Los Molinos, Baja California, San Diego, California and in Central America; there is also a large group in Salt Lake City, UT.

- Joel LeBaron (1955–72)
- Verlan LeBaron (1972–81)
- Current leadership unknown (1981–)

==== Church of Jesus Christ in Solemn Assembly ====
The Church of Jesus Christ in Solemn Assembly and its political arm, the Confederate Nations of Israel, are headquartered in Big Water, Utah. It was founded in 1977 by Alex Joseph and initially grew rapidly. However, after the death of Joseph the status of this sect is unknown.

- Alex Joseph (1977–98)
- Current leadership unknown (1998–)

==== School of the Prophets ====
The School of the Prophets has its headquarters in the Salem, Utah area. In 1968 Robert C. Crossfield published the Book of Onias, which contained revelations he claimed to have received since 1961. These revelations chastised LDS Church leaders for their abandonment of the celestial laws. Crossfield was excommunicated in 1972. The continuing revelations were later published as the Second Book of Commandments. In 1982 Crossfield formally established the School of the Prophets, overseen by a president and six counselors and headquartered in Salem, Utah.

Ron and Dan Lafferty served in March 1984 as counselors in a local school of the prophets for the Provo, Utah, area. Ron and Dan claimed to have received revelation ordering the death of certain individuals, which led to their expulsion from the Crossfield group when they declined to repudiate this revelation. Four months later, Ron and Dan murdered their brother Allen's wife and infant daughter.

- Robert C. Crossfield, founder and president (1968–2018)

==== True and Living Church of Jesus Christ of Saints of the Last Days ====
The True and Living Church of Jesus Christ of Saints of the Last Days (TLC) has its headquarters in Manti, Utah. Membership is estimated at 300 to 500. Organized in 1994, the TLC was a new "restoration" for the "very last days" before the Second Coming of Jesus. While the church initially grew rapidly it has since stagnated, declining in numbers and converts since it ceased missionary efforts in 2000.

- James D. Harmston (1994–2013)
- Current leadership unknown (2013–)

==== The Church of the Firstborn and the General Assembly of Heaven ====
The Church of the Firstborn and the General Assembly of Heaven was originally organized in Magna, Utah by former members of the LDS Church. It practices polygamy and the law of consecration. Its leader, Terrill R. Dalton, purports to be the Holy Ghost and the father of Jesus. However, the group may have declined in numbers after its relocation from Idaho to Montana and Dalton's and assistant Geody Harman's arrest for (and conviction of) two counts of rape.

- Terrill R. Dalton (c. 2001–present)

== See also ==
- Factional breakdown: Mormon fundamentalist sects
