= Leroy S. Johnson =

Fundamentalist Mormon leader (1888–1986)

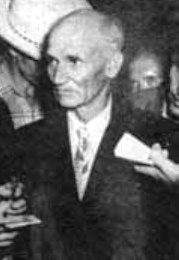
- During the Short Creek raid, 1953

Senior Member of the Priesthood Council (Short Creek Community)
- 1954 – November 25, 1986
- Predecessor: Disputed: Possibly: Joseph White Musser; Charles Zitting
- Successor: Disputed: Possibly: Rulon Jeffs; J. Marion Hammon

Personal details
- Born: Leroy Sunderland Johnson; June 12, 1888; Lee's Ferry, Arizona, U.S.
- Died: November 25, 1986 (aged 98); Hildale, Utah, U.S.
- Spouse(s): At least 15

Leroy Sunderland Johnson (June 12, 1888 – November 25, 1986), known as Uncle Roy, was a leader of the Mormon fundamentalist group in Short Creek, which later evolved into the Fundamentalist Church of Jesus Christ of Latter-Day Saints (FLDS Church), from the mid-1950s until his death.

== Biography ==
Johnson was born on June 12, 1888, at Lee's Ferry, Arizona to Warren Marshall Johnson, a first-generation convert to the Church of Jesus Christ of Latter-day Saints (LDS Church), and one of his wives, Permelia Smith Johnson. Johnson was baptized into the LDS Church at the age of eight, not long after church president Wilford Woodruff's 1890 Manifesto renouncing plural marriage was issued. His father, upon reading the Manifesto, addressed "To Whom It May Concern," simply stated that it did not concern him. Johnson took issue with the Manifesto, being very outspoken about his belief in "the Celestial Law" even before learning about the formal fundamentalist movement within Mormonism. His convictions were strengthened after he traveled to Short Creek straddling the Utah-Arizona border, where a prominent polygamous community was coalescing, and acquainted himself with movement leaders such as John W. Woolley, Joseph White Musser, and John Y. Barlow.

Johnson and his wife Josephine Ford Johnson were excommunicated from the LDS Church in 1935 along with most of the rest of the Short Creek Community after they refused to sign an affidavit abandoning their belief in plural marriage. Then, Johnson chose to officially join the "Woolley group" of fundamentalists, the spiritual predecessor to the modern Fundamentalist Church of Jesus Christ of Latter-Day Saints (FLDS Church), and was eventually ordained an apostle by John Y. Barlow and became one of the group's Council of the Priesthood.

Johnson became a leader of the polygamous movement after Barlow's death in 1949. He did not initially consider his group a distinct organization from the Salt Lake-based LDS Church, describing it simply as "the Fundamentalist division of the Church of Jesus Christ of Latter-day Saints," but by 1952, he openly remarked that he and his followers "have separated ourselves from the Church of Jesus Christ of Latter-day Saints as it now stands." Despite being plagued by incidents such as the 1953 Short Creek raid, Johnson's thirty-two-year tenure as senior member of the Priesthood Council has been characterized as "a time of stability, growth, financial success, and greater public acceptance."

While Johnson is today recognized as a prophet of the FLDS Church, he only implicitly referred to his own prophetic status: "You have heard other men call me a prophet, but you have never heard me make the claim." The non-LDS Mormon prophet Robert Crossfield delivered a revelation to Johnson calling him to repentance, but Johnson rejected it.

While acting as Prophet, Johnson dismissed J. Marion Hammon and Alma A. Timpson from the Council of Friends for their opposition to the "One Man Doctrine". Hammon and Timpson went on to form the Centennial Park group (or "Second Ward") of polygamists just south of Colorado City.

Following Johnson's death in Hildale, Utah, and burial at the Isaac W. Carling Memorial Park on November 25, 1986, Rulon Jeffs succeeded him as leader of the FLDS Church. Although Johnson had been very ill and unable to mingle among the people for several years, his passing created a "climate of upheaval" within the community, during which the church became increasingly authoritarian. The numbers of apostates gradually increased, spiking in the early 21st century, with the turmoil accompanying the imprisonment of Jeffs's son, church president Warren Jeffs, on two counts of child sexual assault.

In recent years, Johnson's tenure as Prophet has become a focal point for Mormon fundamentalists disaffected with the modern FLDS Church. For instance, one of Warren Jeffs's brothers noted that Uncle Roy was a "warm, loving" prophet who "taught polygamy for the right reasons," but Jeffs "has no love for the people."

Johnson's birthday was celebrated as a holiday within the FLDS Church until the practice was discontinued by Warren Jeffs in 2003.

== See also ==
- List of Mormon fundamentalist leaders
- Leroy S. Johnson Meetinghouse

== Notes ==
Mormon fundamentalist titles
Preceded by Joseph White Musser as Senior Member of the Priesthood Council (Short Creek Community)	Senior Member of the Priesthood Council; 1954 – November 25, 1986	Succeeded by Rulon T. Jeffs as Prophet and President of the FLDS Church
Preceded by Charles Zitting as Senior Member of the Priesthood Council (unrecognized)	Senior Member of the Priesthood Council; 1954 – November 25, 1986	Succeeded by J. Marion Hammon as Head of the Centennial Park group
