= Joseph Smith Jessop =

Mormon patriarch (1869–1953)

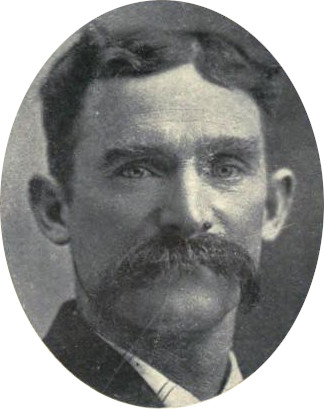

Patriarch in the Mormon fundamentalist movement

Personal details
- Born: January 25, 1869; Millville, Utah, United States
- Died: September 1, 1953 (aged 84); Hildale, Utah, United States
- Resting place: Isaac W. Carling Memorial Park; 36.990°N 112.983°W
- Known For: Co-founder of Hildale, Utah
- Spouse(s): Martha M. Yeates (1871-1938); Gertrude A. Marriott (1928-1952)
- Children: 22
- Parents: Richard Jessop; Mary Ellen Shaffer

Joseph Smith Jessop (January 25, 1869 – September 1, 1953) was an early patriarch in the Mormon fundamentalist movement and, with John Y. Barlow, co-founder of Short Creek, Arizona (later Colorado City, Arizona, and Hildale, Utah), home to the polygynous Short Creek Community.

== Biography ==
=== Background and early life ===
Joseph Smith Jessop was born in Millville, Utah. His parents were Richard Jessop, a native of Lincolnshire, England, and his wife Mary Ellen Shaffer Jessop. Richard Jessop was jailed in 1889 for "unlawful cohabitation", that is, plural marriage.

When his hometown of Millville was incorporated in 1902, Jessop was made one of the town's four trustees.

Jessop was an active socialist in the early 20th century.

=== Mormon fundamentalist ===
Jessop, along with his brother Moroni "Rone" and sister Frances, became interested in the nascent Mormon fundamentalist movement, and in particular the polygamist message of Lorin C. Woolley, after coming into contact with John Y. Barlow and his relative Israel Barlow Jr. Their acceptance of the message led to them becoming local outcasts, despite earlier being "pillars" of the Millville community. On 1 September 1923, Jessop and his family solidified their faith in plural marriage after praying about whether Jessop's daughter Martha "Mattie" should enter into it, to which they felt an affirmative answer from God. After this fact was leaked to the locals, Martha was excommunicated from the LDS Church, causing a "great big splash" in the town.

The Jessop family was friendly with Lorin C. Woolley himself, as he spoke at the funerals of a few family members.

Jessop was excommunicated from the Millville Ward by the LDS Church in 1930, and later moved to Short Creek in 1942.

Jessop was present during an early dispute over placement marriage in 1948, taking an ambivalent neutral position, in between those who objected and those who were supportive of it. Jessop was also among those arrested during the 1953 Short Creek raid, and was placed onto a lengthy journey by bus to Kingman, Arizona in order to be prosecuted. This trip had no bathroom stops, which had exacerbated Jessop's physical and emotional distress following the raid. In light of his old age and infirmity, he was released soon afterwards. He died either from kidney failure or acute phlebitis, a mere few days after being released. A few days before his death, he was reported to have said "the old fire burns in me strong, but it is going out."

At the end of his life, he had 28 children, 112 grandchildren and 145 great-grandchildren, and of those who survived him, 110 could not attend his funeral because they were being held in Phoenix by Arizona authorities. In all, 101 immediate family members attended it.

== Family ==
The Jessop surname has left a prominent legacy, with family historians reporting him to have over 10,000 descendants, as nearly all of his children wound up in plural marriages with large families. Most modern members of the Short Creek community, regardless of their own surnames, can trace at least some of their lineage to Jessop and John Y. Barlow. The unusually high prevalence of the extremely rare disease known as fumarase deficiency among FLDS members has been attributed to cousin marriages between the descendants of these two families.

=== Spouses ===
Martha Moore Yeates was born on July 8, 1871, married Joseph Smith Jessop (then 20 years old) at age 18, and died on June 27, 1938, at age 66.

Gertrude Annie Marriott was born on June 29, 1909, married Joseph Smith Jessop (then 59 years old) at age 19 (Martha was 57), and died on February 16, 1952, at age 42.

Emma Fredericka Solomon was born on February 7, 1902, married Joseph Smith Jessop (then 83 years old) at age 50, and died on August 26, 1988, at age 86.

=== Children ===
Martha had 14 children: Sarah Genevieve (known as Genevieve), Joseph Lyman, Richard Seth, Dowayne Neor, Violet, Ruby, Martha (known as Mattie), Vergel Yeates, Sylmar Greene, Fawnetta (known as Fawn), Millicent (who was a stillborn), Frederick Meade, John (Bill) Millward and Allie.

Annie had 8 children: Thomas Smith, Albert Marriott, William Marshall, Ellen, Joseph Charles and John Marion (twins), Hyrum Martin and Mabel Annie.
