= Charles Zitting =

American Mormon fundamentalist (1894–1954)

Charles F. Zitting
- The priesthood council with Charles Zitting (upper right)

Senior Member of the Priesthood Council (unrecognized)
- March 29, 1954 – July 14, 1954
- Predecessor: Joseph White Musser
- Successor: Leroy S. Johnson

Personal details
- Born: Charles Frederick Zitting; March 30, 1894; Harrisville, Utah, United States
- Died: July 14, 1954 (aged 60); Fort Union, Utah, United States
- Resting place: Elysian Burial Gardens (Millcreek, Utah); 40.671°N 111.858°W
- Known For: A leader of the Mormon fundamentalist Short Creek Community
- Spouse(s): 10
- Children: 37
- Parents: August Frederick Zitting; Susannah Van Etten

Charles Frederick Zitting (March 30, 1894 – July 14, 1954) was a Mormon fundamentalist leader of the community in Short Creek, Arizona.

== Life ==
Zitting's ancestors came to the United States from Sweden, Denmark, Canada, and Britain.

=== Fundamentalism ===
Zitting began his rise in the leadership of the Mormon fundamentalist Short Creek Community when he was arrested on April 1, 1931 on charges of polygamy and bailed out by Lorin C. Woolley, J. Leslie Broadbent, and Joseph W. Musser the next day. After the three paid his bail, Zitting was asked to join the Council of Friends and was ordained to that position months later. He was set apart as High Priest Apostle the same day he was ordained to the Council.

While serving on the Council of Friends, Zitting largely served under LeGrand Woolley, who in turn served under Joseph W. Musser. Woolley led the fundamentalist community at Short Creek while Musser led the community in and around Salt Lake City, Utah. The group near Salt Lake City would later become known as the Apostolic United Brethren, while those remaining in the Short Creek Community would later become the Fundamentalist Church of Jesus Christ of Latter-Day Saints under Leroy S. Johnson.

With Musser's death and Woolley's presence in Salt Lake City, Zitting was left to take charge for the Council of Friends and the Short Creek Community following the Short Creek raid. Leroy S. Johnson assisted Zitting in most of the everyday decisions.

Zitting served as the senior member of the Council of Friends for four months until his death. He was survived by "5 wives, 18 sons, 16 daughters and many grandchildren."

== See also ==
- List of Mormon fundamentalist leaders
- Mormonism and polygamy

== Notes ==
Mormon fundamentalist titles
| Preceded by Joseph White Musser | Senior Member of the Priesthood Council (unrecognized); March 29, 1954–July 14, 1954; With: Leroy S. Johnson as Senior Member of the Priesthood Council (Short Creek Community) | Succeeded by Leroy S. Johnson |
