= Isaac W. Carling Memorial Park =

Cemetery in Colorado City, Arizona

Coordinates: 36°59′23″N 112°57′57″W

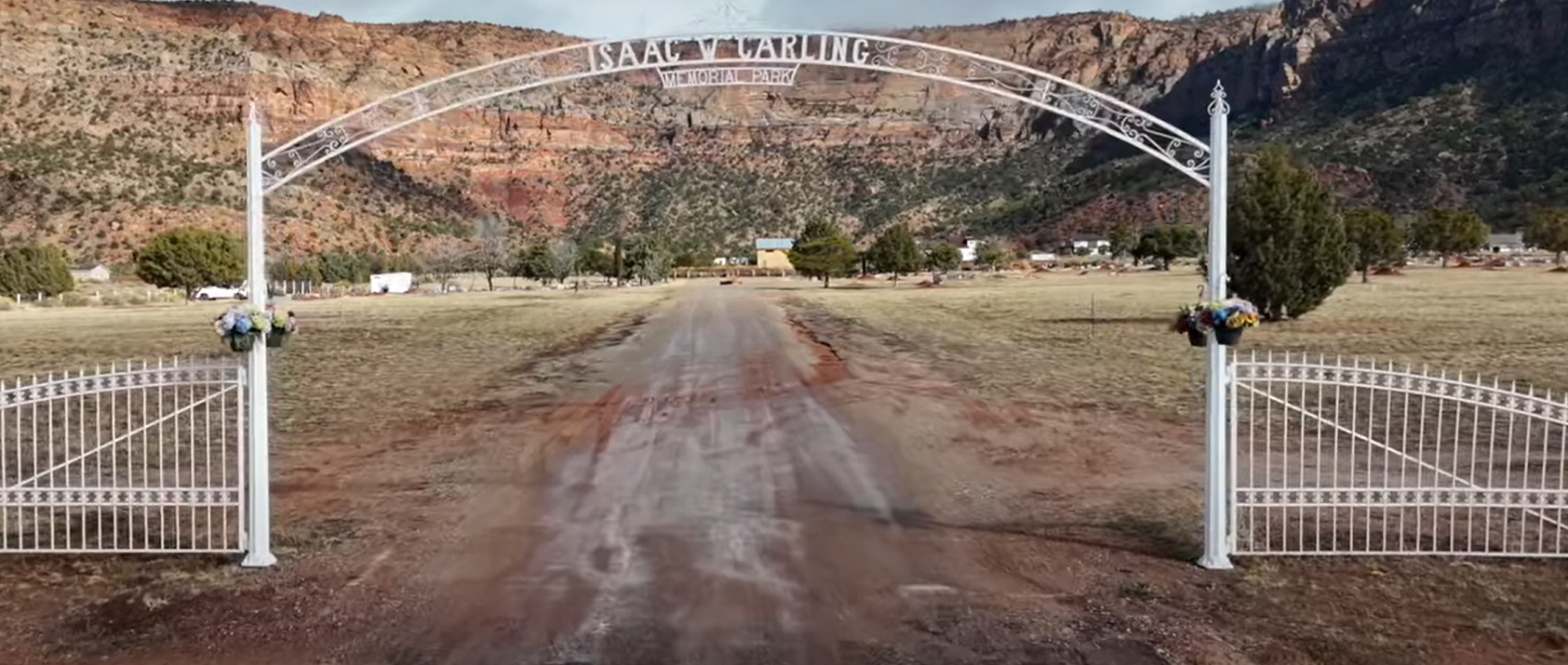
- The Entry arch to the cemetery
- Interactive map of Isaac W. Carling Memorial Park

Details
- Established: c. 1927
- Location: Colorado City, Arizona, US
- No. of graves: 800
- Find a Grave: Isaac W. Carling Memorial Park

The Isaac W. Carling Memorial Park is a cemetery in Colorado City, Arizona, United States. Throughout the 20th and early 21st centuries, it was the main burial site for members of the Fundamentalist Church of Jesus Christ of Latter-Day Saints. The Cemetery is named after Isaac Warren Carling (1894–1938).

== Location ==
The Cemetery is located in Colorado City, just south of the Utah-Arizona state line, and served both the city and Hilldale, Utah in the community known as Short Creek.

== Notable burials ==
- Joseph Smith Jessop (1869–1953), early patriarch in the Mormon fundamentalist movement.
- Leroy S. Johnson (1888–1986), former leader of the Mormon fundamentalist group.
- Rulon Jeffs (1909–2002), former leader and self proclaimed prophet of the Mormon fundamentalist group.

== See also ==
- List of cemeteries in Arizona
