= Prisoner of the Prophet =

2023 American Peacock documentary series

- Genre: Documentary; True crime
- Directed by: Pat McGee
- Country of origin: United States
- Original language: English
- No. of seasons: 1
- No. of episodes: 3

Production
- Cinematography: Adam Linkenhelt; Jeff Marcello
- Running time: 45–53 minutes
- Production companies: Ark Media; Participant

Original release
- Network: Discovery+
- Release: January 30, 2023

Prisoner of the Prophet is an American documentary miniseries on Discovery+, surrounding the polygamous Fundamentalist Church of Jesus Christ of Latter-Day Saints, an offshoot of mainstream Mormonism, and its current leader Warren S. Jeffs. The series was released on January 30, 2023. It is directed by Pat McGee. The series focuses on Jeff's 65th polygamous wife, Briell Decker, and her time both during and following Jeff's incarceration, and the transformation of the community of Short Creek, notably Decker transforming Jeff's former compound into a place of refuge for those leaving the religion.

== Premise ==
Briell Decker, the 65th wife of Warren S. Jeffs exposes the Fundamentalist Church of Jesus Christ of Latter-Day Saints, and documents the transformation of the Short Creek Community (Hilldale, Utah and Colorado City, Arizona), following Jeff's incarceration, and the exodus of the church from the community.

== Episodes ==
No.	Title
1	"The 65th Wife"
Decker explains her upbringing, and her becoming the 65th wife of Warren Jeffs at the age of eighteen.
2	"Blood Atonement"
Decker further exposes life within the church, and her time living as a polygamous wife, as well as her being ordered to leave the community.
3	"The Escape"
After being ordered back to the Short Creek Community by Jeffs, Decker is effectively held prisoner by her family, she realizes this is her time to leave the church.
