= Council of Friends (Woolley) =

One of the original expressions of Mormon fundamentalism

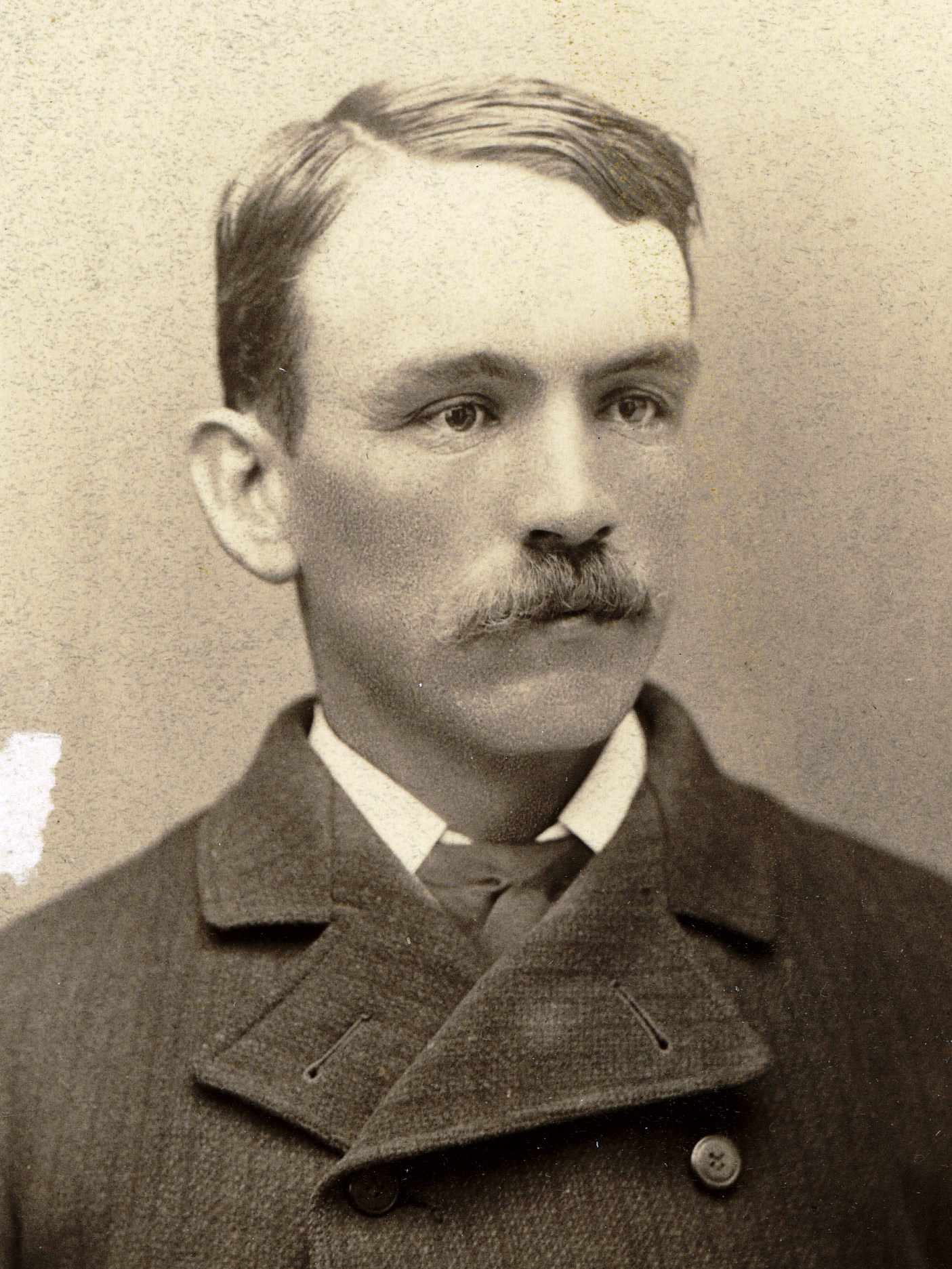
- Lorin C. Woolley in 1882
- Classification: Restorationist
- Orientation: Latter Day Saint movement
- Scripture: The Standard works, plus the 1886 Revelation
- Theology: Mormon fundamentalism
- Polity: Hierarchical
- Headquarters: Short Creek Community
- Founder: Lorin C. Woolley
- Origin: March 6, 1929
- Separated from: The Church of Jesus Christ of Latter-day Saints
- Separations: Fundamentalist Church of Jesus Christ of Latter-Day Saints, Apostolic United Brethren
- Other names: Woolley Group; Priesthood Council
- Publications: Truth (1935–1956)

The Council of Friends (also known as the Woolley Group and the Priesthood Council) was one of the original expressions of Mormon fundamentalism, having its origins in the teachings of Lorin C. Woolley, a courier and bodyguard for polygamous leaders of the Church of Jesus Christ of Latter-day Saints (LDS Church), who was excommunicated in 1924.

== History ==
The LDS Church openly practiced plural marriage from 1852 and went through a series of legal battles with the U.S. government, and eventually ended the practice in 1890. Sometime before 1920, Woolley taught that LDS Church President John Taylor had set apart five men, including himself and his father John W. Woolley, to ensure that the practice of polygamy would continue into perpetuity even if abandoned by the church. Taylor's alleged action came shortly after the 1886 Revelation on the subject of polygamy. Between 1929 and 1933, Woolley extended the same supposed apostolic authority that Taylor granted to him, to a seven-man Council of Friends.

Following the death of Woolley in September 1934, and of his Second Elder J. Leslie Broadbent six months later, the leadership of the Group fell to John Y. Barlow. In May 1935, Barlow and his fellow Friends sent a handful of followers to the small ranching town of Short Creek in the Arizona Strip (now Colorado City, Arizona, and Hildale, Utah), with the express purpose of building "a branch of the Kingdom of God." Barlow believed that the isolated Creek could provide a place of refuge for those engaging in the covert practice of polygamy, a felony; within a month, the town's population more than doubled.

After the failure of an attempted communal United Trust in 1935, the Group, particularly Apostle Rulon Jeffs, an accountant, worked to develop the United Effort Plan (UEP), intended to prepare the way for the collectivist United Order described by Mormon founder Joseph Smith. The UEP was incorporated on November 9, 1942.

By 1944, the illicit activities of the Group, now boasting about 2,500 members, had come to the attention of LDS Church President Heber J. Grant, who agreed to cooperate with state and federal authorities in a multi-state raid intended to wipe out polygamy. In the 1944 raid, forty-six Community adults were accused of "unlawful cohabitation" and similar crimes, of whom fifteen ultimately received state prison sentences and nine federal prison sentences, with two, Charles Zitting and David Darger, receiving both.

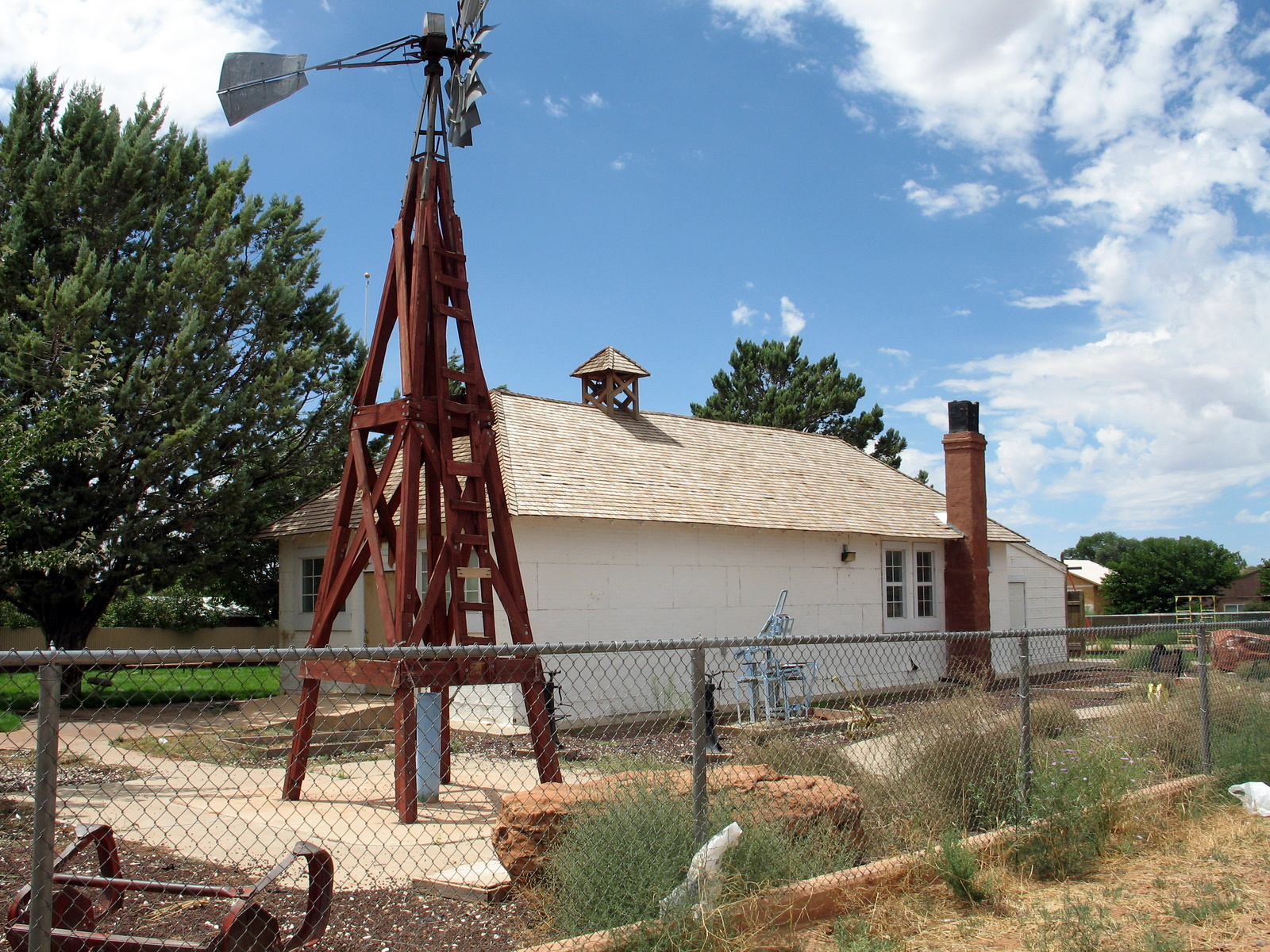
Schoolhouse of the Community and site of the 1953 Short Creek Raid

The group was notorious for the practice of polygamy due to media coverage during the Short Creek raids of 1945 and 1953. The Fundamentalist Church of Jesus Christ of Latter-Day Saints (FLDS Church) later developed in the same geographical region and changed the name of the town to Colorado City and Hildale to eliminate any ties to the Short Creek raids.

Additions were made to Woolley's Council of Friends as time went on and former members died or left the movement. Leroy S. Johnson and Rulon Jeffs, future leaders of the FLDS Church, were ordained by John Y. Barlow in the 1940s, while Joseph Musser's ordination of Rulon C. Allred in 1952 caused a division in the community and led to the creation of the Apostolic United Brethren (AUB). Today, the AUB continues to be led by a Priesthood Council, while the FLDS Church transitioned to autocratic "One Man Rule" by a single prophet in the 1980s. Other fundamentalist groups led by a Priesthood Council include the Centennial Park group, the Latter Day Church of Christ (Kingston Group), and the Righteous Branch of the Church of Jesus Christ of Latter-day Saints (Peterson Group).

== Priesthood authority ==
The authority of the Council of Friends pertained to the Priesthood and not to the church, early Mormon fundamentalists, most of whom had been excommunicated from the LDS Church, felt that its existence gave them the right to continue solemnizing plural marriages even after LDS Church President Wilford Woodruff's 1890 Manifesto discountenancing the practice. Indeed, Woolley claimed to have been ordained to the Council for precisely that purpose by President John Taylor in 1886, along with his father John W. Woolley and four others. In order to ensure that "no year passed by without children being born in the principle of plural marriage." Woolley, who had ostensibly become the last member of the Council after his father's death in December 1928, ordained six more men to the same calling between 1929 and 1933: J. Leslie Broadbent, John Y. Barlow, Joseph White Musser, Charles Zitting, LeGrande Woolley, and Louis A. Kelsch.

== Council of Friends leaders ==
The following are the leaders of the Council of Friends prior to the 1954 split:

- John W. Woolley (1918–1928)
- Lorin C. Woolley (1928–1934)
- J. Leslie Broadbent (1934–1935)
- John Y. Barlow (1935–1949)
- Joseph W. Musser (1949–1954)
- Charles Zitting (1954)
