= Leroy S. Johnson Meetinghouse =

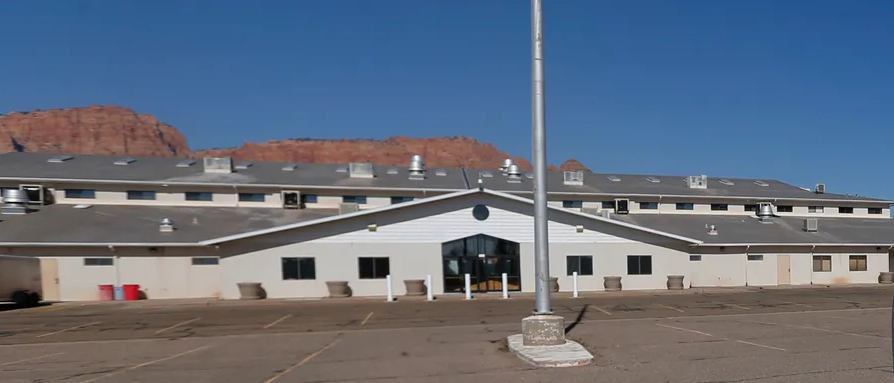
- Leroy S. Johnson Meetinghouse
- 36.99323°N 112.970289°W
- Location: 250 University Avenue, Colorado City, Arizona
- Country: United States
- Denomination: Fundamentalist Church of Jesus Christ of Latter-Day Saints

History
- Status: Open: currently in use as a community center
- Dedication: Leroy S. Johnson

Architecture
- Functional status: Community center

The Leroy S. Johnson Meetinghouse was the meetinghouse of the Fundamentalist Church of Jesus Christ of Latter Day Saints (FLDS) located in Colorado City, Arizona, serving the Short Creek Community which includes Hildale, Utah.

When church prophet Warren Jeffs was arrested in 2006 for sexual assault of children, the town was raided and many church members left the community, with former members reclaiming buildings, including the Meetinghouse.

The building is currently used as the Legacy Community Center.
