= J. Leslie Broadbent =

American Mormon leader (1891-1935)

- circa 1930

Senior Member of the Priesthood Council
- September 30, 1934 – March 16, 1935
- Predecessor: Lorin C. Woolley
- Successor: Disputed, including: John Y. Barlow; Joseph White Musser

Personal details
- Born: Joseph Leslie Broadbent; June 3, 1891; Lehi, Utah, United States
- Died: March 16, 1935; Salt Lake City, Utah, United States
- Cause of death: Pneumonia
- Resting place: Wasatch Lawn Memorial Park; 40.6972°N 111.8492°W
- Spouse(s): Including: Rula L. Kelsch; Fawnetta Jessop; Irene Locket; Anna Kmetzsch
- Children: 6
- Parents: Joseph Samuel Broadbent; Amanda Hermandine Twede

Joseph Leslie Broadbent (June 3, 1891 – March 16, 1935) was a religious leader in the early stages of the Mormon fundamentalist movement.

== Early life ==
Broadbent was born to Amanda Hermandine Twede and Joseph Samuel Broadbent, who served as mayor of Lehi, Utah, from 1922 to 1928.

In 1910, Broadbent left his studies at Brigham Young University to serve a mission in England for the Church of Jesus Christ of Latter-day Saints (LDS Church). In June 1915, he married Rula Louise Kelsch, and through his association with her family came to know John Wickersham Woolley. Among his other wives were Fawnetta Jessop, who married him in October 1925, and Irene Locket and Anna Kmetzsch, who had married him by 1933.

In 1927, Broadbent published the pamphlet "Celestial Marriage", which advocated the practice of plural marriage. This was one of the first Mormon fundamentalist tracts and was a factor in his subsequent excommunication by the LDS Church in July 1929. Broadbent was ordained an apostle in the Mormon fundamentalist organization called the Council of Friends by Lorin Calvin Woolley on March 6, 1929, and on May 15 was given the title of "second elder" by Woolley.

Upon Woolley's death in 1934, Broadbent succeeded him as president. Among Mormon fundamentalists, the succession was largely uncontroversial, and Broadbent traveled widely in support of the fundamentalist movement. In February 1935, he and other fundamentalist leaders visited Millville, Utah, for a meeting with co-religionists. The next month, Broadbent died from pneumonia.

According to his friend Louis Kelsch, on the day of his death Broadbent said that he had not experienced any personal vision of heavenly messengers. However, Broadbent also commented, "If they come to get me, I can tell them that I am still in the work", as he pointed to religious books he planned to mail.

Mormon fundamentalist titles
| Preceded by Lorin C. Woolley | Senior Member of the Priesthood Council; September 30, 1934 - March 26, 1935 | Succeeded by John Y. Barlow as Senior Member of the Priesthood Council |
