= Second Manifesto =

1904 declaration by Joseph F. Smith renouncing polygamy in the LDS Church

The "Second Manifesto" was a 1904 declaration made by Joseph F. Smith, the president of the Church of Jesus Christ of Latter-day Saints (LDS Church), in which Smith stated the church was no longer sanctioning marriages that violated the laws of the land and set down the principle that those entering into or solemnizing polygamous marriages would be excommunicated from the church.

== Background ==
In 1890, church president Wilford Woodruff had issued the initial Manifesto, in which he suspended the LDS Church's long-standing practice of plural marriage. However, after the Manifesto, it became clear that a number of church members, including members of the Quorum of the Twelve Apostles, were continuing to enter into or solemnize polygamous marriages. Smith issued the Second Manifesto near the beginning of the Reed Smoot hearings, United States Congressional hearings into whether LDS Church apostle Reed Smoot should be permitted to sit as a United States senator from Utah; Smoot's opponents alleged that the LDS Church hierarchy's continued tolerance or encouragement of plural marriage should exclude Smoot from sitting in the Senate.

== Announcement ==
The "Second Manifesto" was announced at the general conference of the church held on April 6, 1904. At a public meeting, Smith announced that he would like to read an "official statement" that he had prepared so that his words "may not be misunderstood or misquoted". Smith read:

Inasmuch as there are numerous reports in circulation that plural marriages have been entered into, contrary to the official declaration of President Woodruff of September 24, 1890, commonly called the manifesto, which was issued by President Woodruff, and adopted by the Church at its general conference, October 6, 1890, which forbade any marriages violative of the law of the land, I, Joseph F. Smith, President of the Church of Jesus Christ of Latter-day Saints, hereby affirm and declare that no such marriages have been solemnized with the sanction, consent, or knowledge of the Church of Jesus Christ of Latter-day Saints.

And I hereby announce that all such marriages are prohibited, and if any officer or member of the Church shall assume to solemnize or enter into any such marriage, he will be deemed in transgression against the Church, and will be liable to be dealt with according to the rules and regulations thereof and excommunicated therefrom.

Joseph F. Smith,
President of the Church of Jesus Christ of Latter-day Saints.

Francis M. Lyman, president of the Quorum of the Twelve Apostles, then presented the following resolution of endorsement, which was seconded by B. H. Roberts and accepted unanimously by those in attendance at the conference:

Resolved that we, the members of the Church of Jesus Christ of Latter-day Saints, in General Conference assembled, hereby approve and endorse the statement and declaration of President Joseph F. Smith just made to this Conference concerning plural marriages, and will support the courts of the Church in the enforcement thereof.

Smith's official statement was later published in the Improvement Era, an official magazine of the church.

== Aftermath ==
A number of church leaders were opposed to the enforcement of the so-called "second manifesto", including apostles John W. Taylor and Matthias F. Cowley. As a result of their opposition, both were pressured to resign from the Quorum of the Twelve Apostles in 1905. In 1911 Taylor was excommunicated for continued opposition. In 1909, Francis M. Lyman chaired a church committee to investigate plural marriages since the so-called "second manifesto" mandated excommunication for members who enter new plural marriages. Although the so-called "second manifesto" more harshly ended the official recognition of new plural marriages, existing plural marriages were not automatically dissolved. Many Mormons, including prominent church leaders, maintained plural marriages into the 1940s and 1950s.

As the church began to excommunicate those who continued to enter into or advocate plural marriages, some of those individuals began the Mormon fundamentalist movement. Many such dissidents were motivated by the belief that it was improper for the church to ban plural marriage, which they saw as an "eternal commandment", while others pointed out that neither the original nor the second so called "manifestos" were presented as revelations from God, as previous statements of important church doctrine had been.

Unlike the 1890 Manifesto, the LDS Church has not canonized the so-called "second manifesto" by printing it in the appendix of the Doctrine and Covenants as an "official declaration". However the so-called "second manifesto" remains an accurate description of the church's attitude towards its members who enter into, solemnize, or support polygamous marriages.

== See also ==
- John Wickersham Woolley
- Short Creek raid
