= Joseph White Musser =

Mormon fundamentalist leader and official (1872–1954)

- The priesthood council with Joseph White Musser (lower right)

Senior Member of the Priesthood Council
- December 29, 1949 – March 29, 1954
- Predecessor: John Y. Barlow
- Successor: Rulon C. Allred (Apostolic United Brethren); Charles Zitting (Priesthood Council)

Personal details
- Born: March 8, 1872; Salt Lake City, Utah, United States
- Died: March 29, 1954 (aged 82); Salt Lake City, Utah, United States
- Resting place: Salt Lake City Cemetery; 40.7772°N 111.858°W
- Spouse(s): Rose S. Borquist; Mary C. Hill; Ellis R. Shipp Jr. Lucy O. Kmetzsch
- Children: 21
- Parents: Amos Milton Musser; Mary E. White

Joseph White Musser (March 8, 1872 – March 29, 1954) was a Mormon fundamentalist leader.

Musser was born in Salt Lake City, Utah, to Amos Milton Musser (an assistant LDS Church historian) and Mary E. White. He is known for his Mormon fundamentalist books, pamphlets and magazines, as well as being considered a prophet by many Mormon fundamentalists.

== LDS Church service ==
On June 29, 1892, Musser was called to the 16th Quorum of the Seventy, and two years later in April 1895 served a mission in Alabama, having been set apart by Brigham Young, Jr., Heber J. Grant, and John W. Taylor.

On Thanksgiving Day 1899, in the company of four other couples, Musser and his wife, Rose Selms Borquist, received their Second Anointing at the unusually young age of twenty-seven, under the direction of Lorenzo Snow. Musser was later told by apostle Brigham Young, Jr. that he had been sent by the President of the Church, Joseph F. Smith, to tell Musser that if he did not enter into the principle of plural marriage he would lose his blessings (presumably, the blessings promised in the Second Anointing). This likely suggested to Musser that living plural marriage was a pre-requisite qualification for the blessings of the Second Anointing, regardless of the previous administration of the ordinance.

In November 1901, Musser was made president of the 105th Quorum of Seventy, and would later also serve as a high councilor in the Uintah, Wasatch and Granite Stakes (being set apart by president Joseph F. Smith). "On 16 February 1903 Patriarch John M. Murdock ordained Musser to the office of High Priest. He was then the husband to two women; both marriages were post-Manifesto". Musser was also the Duchesne Uintah branch president beginning in 1906.

== Wives and post-Manifesto plural marriage ==
Musser married his first wife, Rose S. Borquist in the Logan Temple in June 1892, and his second wife, Mary C. Hill, in March 1902. But upon marrying his third wife, Ellis R. Shipp Jr., in July 1907, he caught the attention of the Salt Lake Tribune, which announced the marriage on its front page. His support of continued plural marriages, in violation of the first and second Manifestos of the LDS Church, led him to be called before the Quorum of Twelve Apostles of the church in July 1909, but this did not lead to any disciplinary action against him.

According to Musser, in 1915 he was given authority to perform plural marriages by "an apostle." He was excommunicated from the LDS Church by the high council of the Salt Lake City-based Granite Stake on March 21, 1921 for attempting to take Marion Bringhurst as his fourth wife.

In May 1932, Musser married again, this time Lucy O. Kmetzsch, and on the May 14, 1929, he was ordained an apostle in the Council of Friends by Lorin Calvin Woolley, the then-leader of the Mormon fundamentalist movement.

In the 1930s and 1940s, Musser was responsible for editing the Mormon fundamentalist publication Truth Magazine. His promotion and practice of plural marriage led to his incarceration by the U.S. federal government between May and December 1945.

== Controversy ==
A concessionary document he and some of his fellow polygamist inmates signed (which they were told was limited to the period of their parole) during their time in prison led to some dissension between those who would sign and those who would not.

In late December 1949, with the death of John Yeates Barlow, Musser became the leader of the Mormon fundamentalists. However, upon his May 1951 decision to select Rulon C. Allred as an apostle, some other members of the presiding Priesthood Council felt they were being bypassed. Other leaders also took issue at Musser's condemnation of the practices of underage and arranged marriages that were going on in the Short Creek, Arizona Mormon fundamentalist community. This split deepened in July 1951 with the call of Mexican apostle Margarito Bautista, and in January 1952 Musser created a new Priesthood Council including Owen A. Allred, and others, including the apostles he had already called.

Upon Musser's death on March 29, 1954, the fundamentalists in Short Creek refused to accept the leadership of his appointed successor, Rulon Allred, and instead LeRoy S. Johnson became their leader, while the fundamentalists in Mexico and the Salt Lake City region remained faithful to Allred. Some of those who supported neither group became independent Mormon fundamentalists.

== Works ==
- Musser, Joseph White (1895), Mormonism from its earliest phases to the present time, Northern Farmer and Fancier, OCLC 28355336
- —— (1934), The new and everlasting covenant of marriage, Truth Publications, OCLC 13962884
- —— (1935), An open letter to Heber J. Grant, April 15, 1935, OCLC 5948001
- ——; Morgan, Dale L (1939), Michael, Our Father and Our God, Truth Publications, OCLC 24039364
- —— (1944), Celestial or Plural Marriage, Salt Lake City: J.W. Musser, OCLC 1535179
- —— (1953), The Star of Truth, OCLC 365215002
- ——, Joseph W. Musser, 1872-1954 [journal], OCLC 34442527
- —— (1900s), The law of plural marriage, Truth Publications, OCLC 14758297
- —— (1900s), Economic Order of heaven, Truth Publications, OCLC 34455269
- —— (1989), Truth, OCLC 658826924
- —— (2008), It Is Written, Messenger Publications, ISBN 978-1-4382-5123-3
- —— (2008), The Sermons of Joseph W. Musser, Messenger Publications, ISBN 978-1-4382-5124-0
- —— (2010), Joseph W. Musser's book of remembrance, Mona, Utah: Hindsight Publications, OCLC 682193441

== See also ==
- List of Mormon fundamentalist leaders

== Notes ==
Mormon fundamentalist titles
Preceded by John Y. Barlow	Senior Member of the Priesthood Council; December 29, 1949 - March 29, 1954	Succeeded by Rulon C. Allred as President of the Priesthood of the Apostolic United Brethren
Preceded by John Y. Barlow	Senior Member of the Priesthood Council; December 29, 1949 - March 29, 1954	As Senior Member of the Priesthood Council
Preceded by John Y. Barlow	Senior Member of the Priesthood Council; December 29, 1949 - March 29, 1954	Succeeded by Leroy S. Johnson (Short Creek Community)
Preceded by John Y. Barlow	Senior Member of the Priesthood Council; December 29, 1949 - March 29, 1954	Succeeded by Charles Zitting (unrecognized)
Notes and references
1. Hales, Brian C. "J. Leslie Broadbent". mormonfundamentalism.com. Archived from the original on December 26, 2013.
