= John W. Woolley =

Mormon fundamentalist leader (1831–1928)

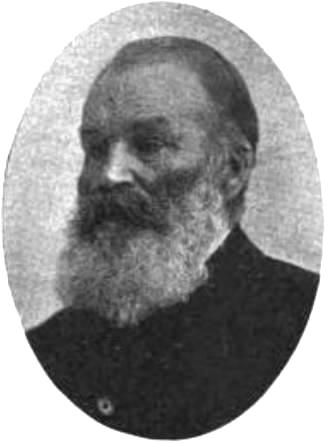

Senior Member of the Priesthood Council
- before 1835 – December 13, 1928
- Predecessor: Disputed
- Successor: Lorin Calvin Woolley

Personal details
- Born: John Wickersham Woolley; December 30, 1831; Newlin, Pennsylvania, United States
- Died: December 13, 1928 (aged 96); Centerville, Utah, United States
- Resting place: Centerville City Cemetery; 40.913°N 111.868°W
- Spouse(s): Julia Searles Ensign (m. 1851–1892) Ann Reed Everington Roberts (m. 1886–1910) Annie Fisher (m. 1910–1928)
- Children: 6
- Signature

John Wickersham Woolley (December 30, 1831 – December 13, 1928) was an American Latter Day Saint and one of the founders of the Mormon fundamentalism movement. Most Mormon fundamentalist groups trace their origin directly or indirectly to Woolley.

== Early life ==
Woolley was born on December 30, 1831 to Edwin D. and Mary W. Woolley, the first of Edwin's seven wives, in Newlin, Chester County, Pennsylvania. Edwin Woolley was originally a Quaker farmer, but converted to Mormonism in 1837. The Woolley family emigrated to Utah Territory with the Mormon pioneers in the late 1840s. Edwin would later become Brigham Young's business manager, as well as one of his closest friends, and a bishop in the Church of Jesus Christ of Latter-day Saints (LDS Church) from 1853 to 1881.

== Career and involvement with the LDS Church ==
Woolley held many civil positions in Utah Territory, such as constable, justice of the peace, deputy sheriff, deputy territorial marshal, and county commissioner. Within the Nauvoo Legion (in the State of Deseret), he served as a Lieutenant, Captain, Sergeant and Major. He participated in the Black Hawk War, and was one of the ten who crossed Little Mountain to meet Johnston's Army in 1857.

Having been ordained a high priest of the LDS Church by Brigham Young, Woolley served in a bishopric, as a high councilor in the Davis Stake, and was ordained a patriarch in the church in 1913. He also was an ordinance worker in the Salt Lake Temple and he opened meetings of the church's general conference with prayer on more than one occasion. Woolley was among the first to meet the handcart companies in 1856, and in 1860 and 1863 he brought emigrants across the plains himself. On the last occasion, Joseph F. Smith acted as the chaplain in his "company", and they became lifelong friends, with Smith having picnics with the Woolley family and speaking at his wife's funeral.

== Family ==
Woolley was married and sealed to his first wife, Julia E. Sirls, in March 1851 and was endowed at the same time. He had six children by Julia: John, Franklin, Lorin, Julia, Mary, and Amy. He went on later to marry Ann Everington in 1886. In 1910, the widowed Woolley married Annie Fisher, with Joseph F. Smith performing the civil ceremony.

Woolley was uncle to LDS Church President Spencer W. Kimball, and apostles J. Reuben Clark and John W. Taylor. He was also the stepfather to the (adult) B. H. Roberts, a member of the First Council of the Seventy.

== Involvement with Mormon fundamentalism ==
Woolley is perhaps best known as the father of Mormon fundamentalism and amongst most fundamentalists is considered an apostle, prophet, and president of the priesthood.

At the age of eight, Woolley received a patriarchal blessing from Joseph Smith, Sr., who at the time was the Presiding Patriarch of the Church of Jesus Christ of Latter-day Saints. Within this blessing, Woolley was promised he would "be called to responsible stations," that it would involve having to "receive keys," as well as "glory and honor" and "worlds of knowledge and power", and that he would one day "be called the Lord's anointed." Fundamentalist Mormons see this as a prophecy of the later role he would play as their leader.

According to an account given by his son Lorin C. Woolley in 1929, when John Taylor was in hiding there were very few homes in which he felt his safety was secure, and very few people in whom he placed his confidence, Woolley was one of these men. His son Lorin acted as a messenger and sometimes a bodyguard for Taylor. It was in John Woolley's home that Jesus Christ and Joseph Smith allegedly visited Taylor on the night of September 26, 1886, and where the following day Taylor allegedly set apart five men (including John, Lorin, and George Q. Cannon) as apostles, with a special commission to keep alive celestial plural marriage by granting them the authority to set apart others in perpetuity. This account is disputed by LDS Church apologists.

In 1890, LDS Church President Wilford Woodruff issued what has become known as The Manifesto, officially calling for an end to the practice of plural marriage by church members in the United States. Because certain members (Woolley among them) did not take The Manifesto seriously, in 1904 another proclamation, the Second Manifesto, was put forth by church president Joseph F. Smith, which stated that those who did not cease the continuation of the practice would be excommunicated from the church. Woolley did not comply and was excommunicated from the LDS Church in 1914.

Woolley died on December 13, 1928 in his Centerville home. His son Lorin Woolley succeeded him as a leader among Mormon fundamentalists.

== See also ==
- List of Mormon fundamentalist leaders

Mormon fundamentalist titles
Preceded by John Taylor as 3rd President of The Church of Jesus Christ of Latter-day Saints	Senior Member of the Priesthood Council before 1935 –December 13, 1928	Succeeded by Lorin Calvin Woolley
Notes and references
1. Hales, Brian C. "J. Leslie Broadbent". mormonfundamentalism.com. Archived from the original on 28 September 2008.; 3. Rulon, Jeffs (1997). History of Priesthood Succession in the Dispensation of the Fullness of Times and Some Challenges to the One Man Rule. Rulon Jeffs. p. 243.; 4. Brian C., Hales. "Questions regarding the described 1886 ordinations". .mormonfundamentalism.com. Archived from the original on 11 February 2010.
