= Short Creek Community =

Small settlement at Arizona-Utah state border

- Community
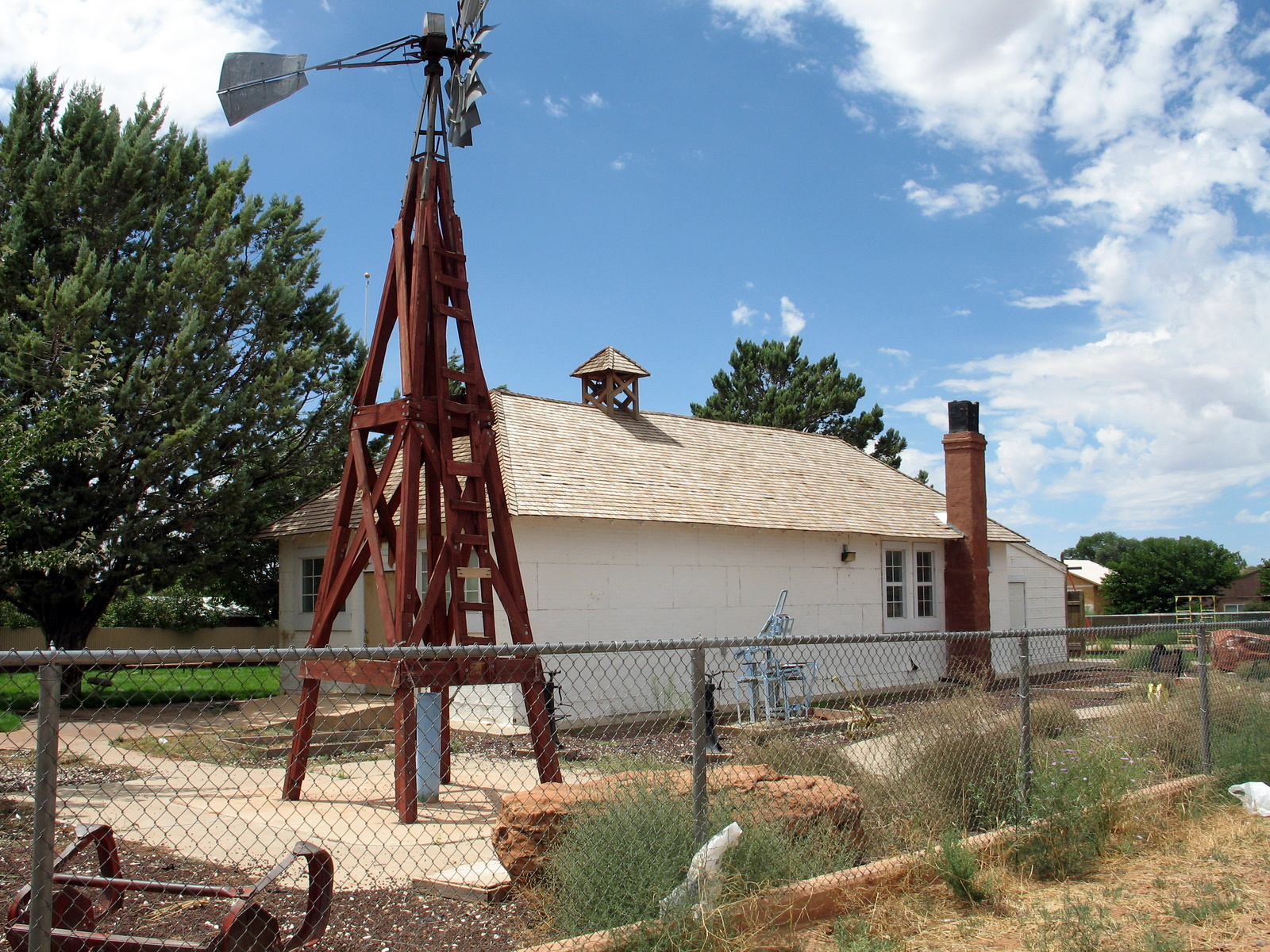
- Interactive map of Short Creek Community
- Coordinates: 36°59′22″N 112°58′41″W
- Founded: 1913
- Time zone: UTC−7 (MST)

The Short Creek Community (Colorado City, Arizona, and Hildale, Utah), founded in 1913, began as a small ranching town in the Arizona Strip. In the 1930s it was settled by Mormon fundamentalists.

== History ==
In May 1935, members of the Council of Friends, a group of fundamentalists excommunicated from the Salt Lake City–based the Church of Jesus Christ of Latter-day Saints, sent a handful of followers to the Short Creek Community with the express purpose of building "a branch of the Kingdom of God." Fundamentalist leader John Barlow believed that the isolated Creek could provide a place of refuge for those engaging in the covert practice of polygamy, which was criminalized using bigamy statutes from 1935 to 2013 and 2017 to 2020. Within a month, the town's population more than doubled. The Council of Friends membership desired a remote location where they could practice polygamy, which had been publicly abandoned by the LDS Church in 1890.

On July 26, 1953, Arizona Governor John Howard Pyle sent troops into the settlement to stop polygamy in what became known as the Short Creek raid. The two-year legal battle that followed became a public relations disaster that damaged Pyle's political career and set a hands-off tone toward the town in Arizona for the next 50 years. The Fundamentalist Church of Jesus Christ of Latter Day Saints (FLDS) later developed in the same geographical region and changed the name to Colorado City and Hildale to eliminate any ties to the Short Creek raids.

== Council of Friends ==
The concept of a Council of Friends or Priesthood Council was central to the Mormon fundamentalist theology developed by Lorin C. Woolley and others in the Short Creek Community. The Short Creek Community was home to this council starting in the late 1920s. Since the authority of the Council of Friends pertained to the Priesthood and not to the Church, early Mormon fundamentalists, most of the residents of Short Creek Community had been excommunicated from the LDS Church. They felt that the existence of the Council of Friends gave them the right to continue solemnizing plural marriages even after Church President Wilford Woodruff's 1890 Manifesto strenuously disapproving of the practice.

=== Short Creek Community leadership ===
The following are the leaders of the Council of Friends, and as such were also leaders in the Short Creek Community.

- John W. Woolley (1918–1928)
- Lorin C. Woolley (1928–1934)
- J. Leslie Broadbent (1934–1935)
- John Y. Barlow (1935–1949)
- Joseph W. Musser (1949–1954)
- Charles Zitting (1954)

== Birth defects ==
As of 2017, the descendants of the Short Creek Community are reported to have a high incidence of fumarase deficiency, an extremely rare genetic disease. It causes encephalopathy, severe intellectual disability, unusual facial features, brain malformation, and epileptic seizures. The high rate of this particular genetic anomaly is attributed to generations of consanguineous marriages within the community.

== See also ==
- List of Mormon fundamentalist sects
- Mormon fundamentalism
