= John Y. Barlow =

Mormon church leader (1874–1949)

- The priesthood council with Barlow (lower left)

Senior Member of the Priesthood Council (Short Creek Community)
- March 16, 1935 – December 29, 1949
- Predecessor: J. Leslie Broadbent
- Successor: Joseph White Musser

Personal details
- Born: John Yeates Barlow; March 4, 1874; Panaca, Nevada, United States
- Died: December 29, 1949 (aged 75); Salt Lake City, Utah, United States
- Resting place: Bountiful Memorial Park; 40.8672°N 111.8874°W
- Spouse(s): Ida M. Critchlow; Susannah S. Taggart; Ada Marriott; Martha Jessop
- Parents: Israel Barlow; Hannah Yeates

John Yeates Barlow (also known as John Yates Barlow) (March 4, 1874 – December 29, 1949) was a Mormon fundamentalist leader in Short Creek, Arizona.

== Childhood ==
Barlow was born in Panaca, Lincoln County, Nevada, to Israel Barlow and his English-born wife Hannah Yeates. His grandfather was Israel Barlow. He grew up on his father's farm in Davis County, Utah.

== Polygamous marriages ==
Barlow married for the first time in 1897. He took his first plural wife in 1902, the second in 1918, and the third in 1923 making a total of four wives (including his first legal wife). While serving as a missionary for the Church of Jesus Christ of Latter-day Saints, Barlow defended his polygamous views and was dishonorably released. Later, LDS Church apostle Melvin J. Ballard, the president of the Northwest States Mission during Barlow's service there, served as witness in the disciplinary council that resulted in Barlow's excommunication.

As a member of the Council of Friends, Barlow was involved in the succession conflict following J. Leslie Broadbent's death. Elden Kingston claimed that Broadbent had ordained him as Second Elder of the Council of Friends. Kingston, along with his father, Charles W. Kingston, would separate from the main Short Creek Community and create the Davis County Cooperative Society and the Latter Day Church of Christ.

Due to Barlow's seniority in the Council of Friends and his assertion that he was Second Elder under Broadbent, he was mostly accepted by the Short Creek community. He led the community until his death.

== See also ==
- List of Mormon fundamentalist leaders

Mormon fundamentalist titles
Preceded by J. Leslie Broadbent	Senior Member of the Priesthood Council (Short Creek Community); March 16, 1935 - December 29, 1949	Succeeded by Joseph White Musser
