= Short Creek raid =

1953 mass arrest in Arizona, US

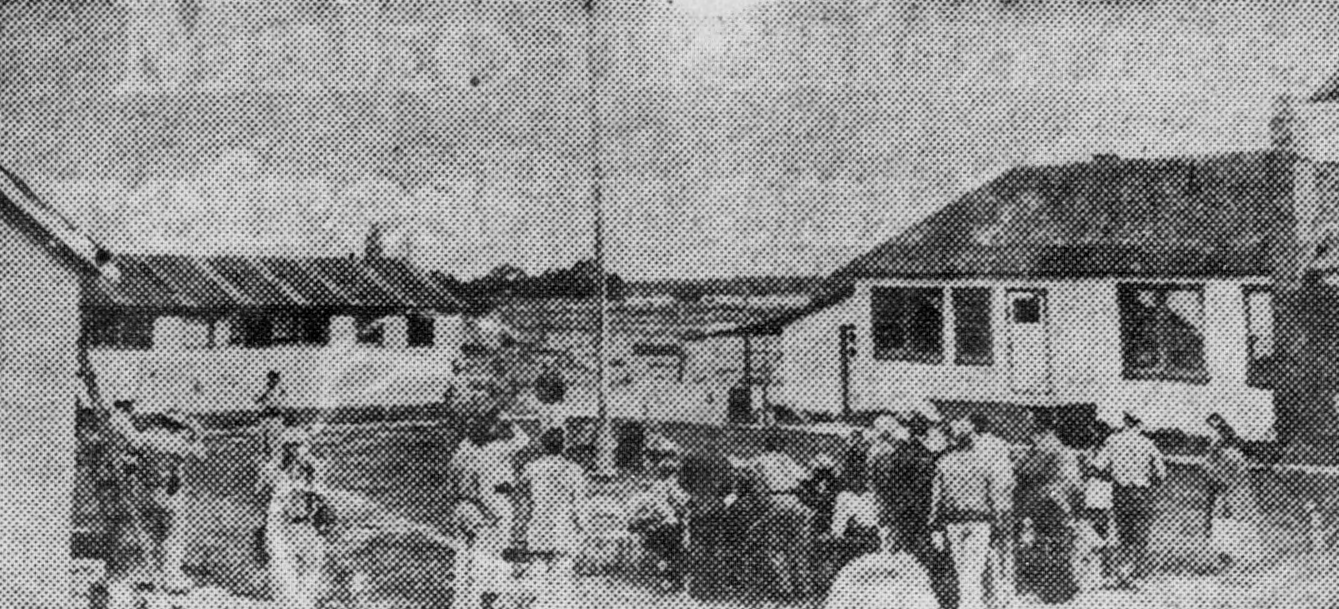
- Men from Short Creek gathered at local school
- Date: July 26, 1953
- Location: Short Creek Community; 36°59′22″N 112°58′41″W
- Arrests: 40+

The Short Creek raid was an Arizona Department of Public Safety and Arizona National Guard action against Mormon fundamentalists that took place on the morning of July 26, 1953, at Short Creek, Arizona. The Short Creek raid was the "largest mass arrest of polygamists in American history". Law enforcement arrested polygamist men and removed children from their families. Arizona governor John Howard Pyle had invited journalists to view the raid, and the resulting media coverage from multiple outlets was negative, criticizing the raid's tactics and the intrusion upon children.

== Events ==
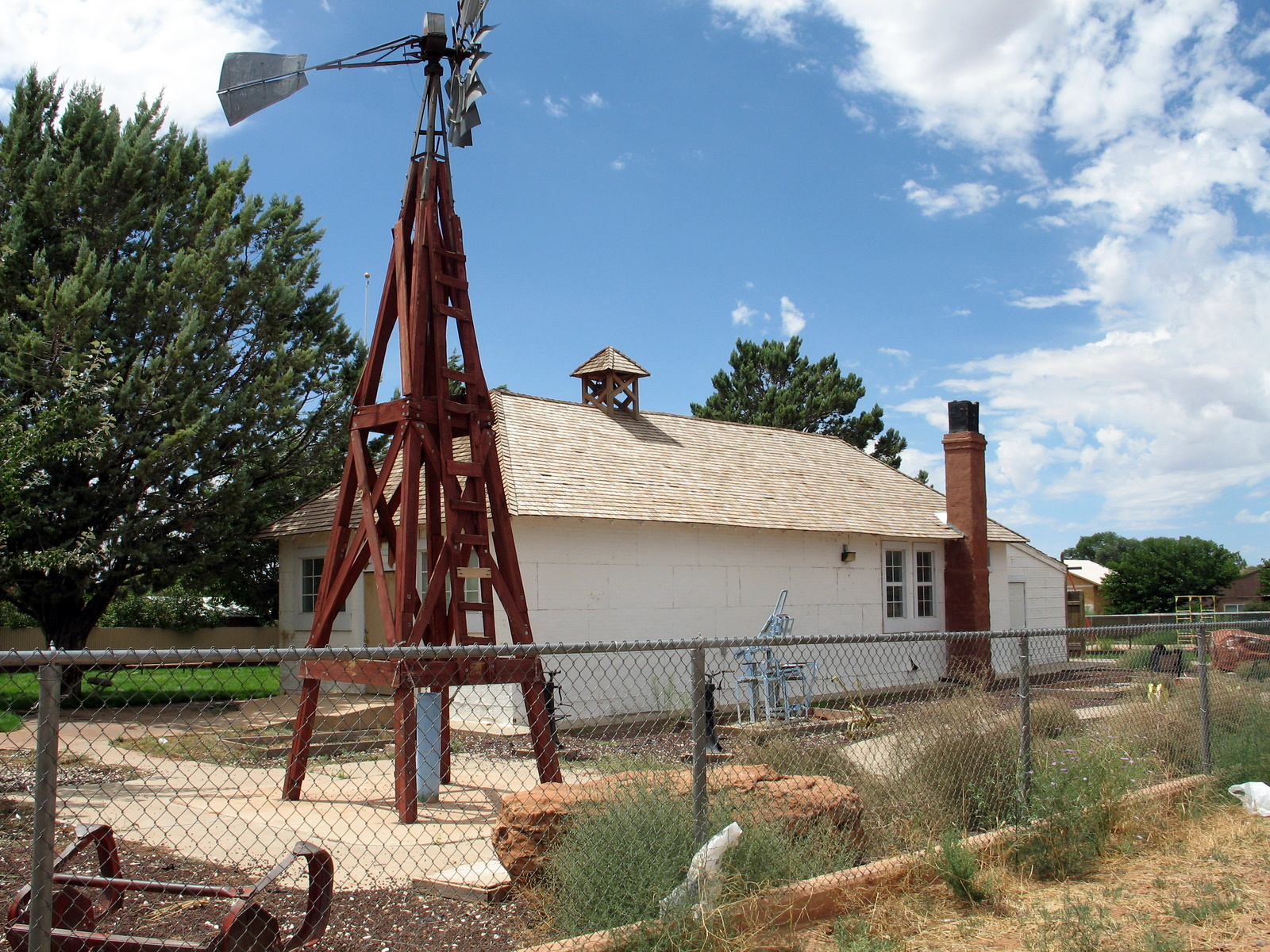
The schoolhouse where the Mormon fundamentalists were during the raid.

Just before dawn on July 26, 1953, 102 Arizona officers of public safety and soldiers from the Arizona National Guard entered Short Creek. The community, which was composed of approximately 400 Mormon fundamentalists, had been tipped off about the planned raid and were found singing hymns in the schoolhouse while the children played outside. The entire community was taken into custody, with the exception of six individuals who were found not to be fundamentalist Mormons. Time called it "the largest mass arrest of polygamists in American history". Arizona law enforcement took 164 dependent children into custody; a superior court ordered in March 1955 that they be released back to their families. Numerous Short Creek children ended up in foster care and some were never returned to their families. Historian D. Michael Quinn argued that the raid's "only American parallel is the federal actions against Native Americans in the nineteenth century."

== Media attention ==
Arizona Governor John Howard Pyle initially called the raid "a momentous police action against insurrection" and described the Mormon fundamentalists as participating in "the foulest conspiracy you could possibly imagine" that was designed to produce "white slaves". More than 100 reporters had been invited by Pyle to accompany the police to observe the raid. However, the raid and its tactics attracted mostly negative media attention; one newspaper editorialized:

By what stretch of the imagination could the actions of the Short Creek children be classified as insurrection? Were those teenagers playing volleyball in a school yard inspiring a rebellion? Insurrection? Well, if so, an insurrection with diapers and volleyballs!

Arizona newspapers variously called the raid "odious" and "un-American". Time and Newsweek also covered the raid. One commentator has averred that coverage of the raid was "probably the first time in history that American polygamists had received media coverage that was largely sympathetic." When Pyle lost his bid for re-election in 1954 to Democratic candidate Ernest McFarland, Pyle blamed the fallout from the raid as having destroyed his political career.

The Church of Jesus Christ of Latter-day Saints (LDS Church) owned the Deseret News, a periodical that supported the raid on Short Creek. The News applauded the action as necessary to prevent the fundamentalists from becoming "a cancer of a sort that is beyond hope of human repair." When the paper later editorialized its support for separating children from their polygamist parents, there was a backlash against the paper and the church by a number of Latter-day Saints, including Juanita Brooks, who complained that the church organization was approving of "such a basically cruel and wicked thing as the taking of little children from their mother." The Short Creek raid was the last action against polygamous Mormon fundamentalists that has been actively supported by the LDS Church.

== Aftermath ==
After the Short Creek raid, the fundamentalist Mormon polygamist colony at Short Creek eventually rejuvenated. Short Creek was renamed Colorado City in 1960. In 1991, the Mormon fundamentalists at Colorado City formally established the Fundamentalist Church of Jesus Christ of Latter Day Saints (FLDS Church). The members of the sect did not face any prosecutions for its polygamous behavior until the late 1990s, when isolated individuals began to be prosecuted. In 2006, FLDS Church leader Warren Jeffs was placed on the FBI Ten Most Wanted List; he was arrested in 2007 and in 2011 was convicted in Texas of two counts of child sexual abuse and sentenced to life in prison.

On 3 April 2008, following allegations of physical and sexual abuse by an unidentified caller who described herself as a 16-year-old girl, law enforcement officers raided a FLDS compound Jeffs had founded in Texas called the YFZ Ranch. As of 8 April, a total of 416 children had been removed from the compound by authorities. A former member of the FLDS Church, Carolyn Jessop, arrived on-site 6 April and stated her opinion that the action in Texas was unlike the Short Creek raid. Others, however, have drawn direct connections between the two events.

== See also ==
- Hildale, Utah
- Joseph White Musser: Mormon fundamentalist leader during the raid
- Short Creek Community

== Sources ==
- Bradley, Martha Sonntag (1993). Kidnapped from That Land: The Government Raids on the Short Creek Polygamists. Publications in Mormon Studies. University of Utah Press. ISBN 0-87480-528-7.
- Driggs, Ken (Spring 1990). "After the Manifesto: Modern Polygamy and Fundamentalist Mormons". Journal of Church and State. 32 (2): 367–389. doi:10.1093/jcs/32.2.367.
- Driggs, Ken (Winter 1992). "Who Shall Raise the Children? Vera Black and the Rights of Polygamous Utah Parents". Utah Historical Quarterly. 60 (1): 27–46. doi:10.2307/45063508. JSTOR 45063508. S2CID 254436238. Archived from the original on October 21, 2013.
- Quinn, D. Michael (Summer 1998). "Plural Marriage and Mormon Fundamentalism". Dialogue. 31 (2): 1–68. doi:10.2307/45226443. JSTOR 45226443.
- Van Wagoner, Richard S. (1992). Mormon Polygamy: A History (3rd ed.). Signature Books. ISBN 1-56085-057-4.
