= Colorado City, Arizona =

Town in Mohave County, Arizona, US

- Town
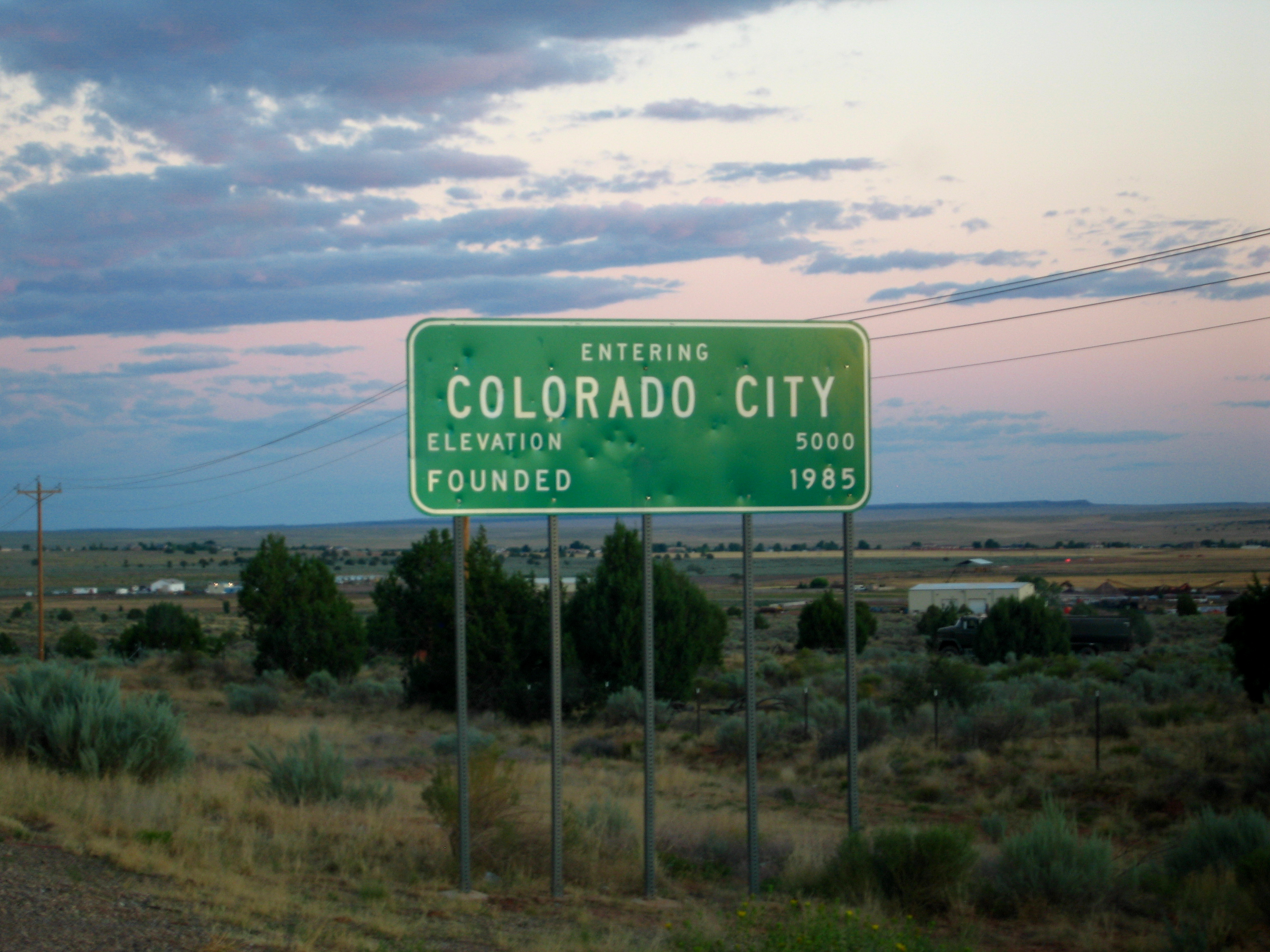
- Colorado City sign

- Location in Mohave County, Arizona
- Coordinates: 36°59′25″N 112°59′13″W
- Country: United States
- State: Arizona
- County: Mohave
- Founded: 1913
- Incorporated: September 1985

Government
  - Type: Council–manager

Area
  - Total: 8.924 sq mi (23.113 km^{2})
  - Land: 8.916 sq mi (23.092 km^{2})
  - Water: 0.0081 sq mi (0.021 km^{2})
- Elevation: 4,935 ft (1,504 m)

Population (2020)
  - Total: 2,478
  - Density: 277.2/sq mi (107.02/km^{2})
- Time zone: UTC–7 (Mountain (MST))
- ZIP Code: 86021
- Area code: 928
- FIPS code: 04-14870
- GNIS feature ID: 2413230
- Sales tax: 8.6%
- Website: tocc.us

Colorado City is a town in Mohave County, Arizona, United States, and is located in a region known as the Arizona Strip. The population was 2,478 at the 2020 census. The Town of Colorado City, Arizona, incorporated in September 1985, was established by residents seeking local self-government and essential services. It is notable as a colony of Mormon polygamists, together with neighboring Hildale, Utah.

== History ==
Colorado City, formerly known as "Short Creek" (or the Short Creek Community), was founded in 1913 by members of the Council of Friends, a breakaway group from the Salt Lake City–based Church of Jesus Christ of Latter-day Saints (LDS Church). The Council of Friends membership desired a remote location where they could practice plural marriage, which had been publicly abandoned by the LDS Church in 1890. On July 26, 1953, Arizona Governor John Howard Pyle sent troops into the settlement to stop polygamy in what became known as the Short Creek raid. The two-year legal battle that followed became a public relations disaster that damaged Pyle's political career and set a hands-off tone toward the town in Arizona for the next 50 years.

After the death of Joseph W. Musser, the community split into two groups: the Fundamentalist Church of Jesus Christ of Latter-Day Saints stayed in Short Creek, while the Apostolic United Brethren relocated to Bluffdale, Utah. The FLDS changed the name of the community to Colorado City (on the Arizona side of the border) and Hildale (on the Utah side) to eliminate any ties to the Short Creek raids.

In January 2004, local FLDS fundamentalist leader Warren Jeffs expelled a group of 20 men, including the mayor, and gave their wives and children to other men. Jeffs, now a convicted sexual predator, stated he was acting on the orders of God, while the men expelled claimed they were penalized for disagreeing with Jeffs. Observers stated that this was the most severe split to date within the community other than the split between Colorado City and Centennial Park. According to the Utah attorney general's office, this was not the first time Jeffs was accused of expelling men from the community; as many as 400 young men are estimated to have been expelled by Jeffs from 2001 to 2006. Most were removed for failing to follow Jeffs' rules, or for dating women without his permission. Many of these expelled men and boys were very naïve and sheltered and often wound up homeless in nearby towns such as Hurricane and St. George, Utah. Jeffs was placed on the FBI Ten Most Wanted list and eventually arrested on August 28, 2006.

Most of the property in the town was owned by the United Effort Plan, a real estate trust of the FLDS. In 2007, the state authorities began dismantling church ownership of Colorado City lands. The FLDS church retaliated and indoctrinated their followers against the state, believing they were being targeted because of their beliefs. The FLDS followers became further secluded as a result. Remaining FLDS members refuse to believe the charges against Jeffs.

On April 6, 2010, law enforcement officials in Mohave County, Arizona, and Washington County, Utah, served five search warrants seeking records from town officers. The warrants were served on government officials and departments, including the Town Manager, David Darger, as well as Colorado City's fire chief Jacob Barlow. As a result of the initial warrants, the Hildale Department of Public Safety was shut down, and emergency responders were prohibited from responding to calls without the approval of county officials. Firefighter Glen Jeffs indicated that the warrants referenced "misuse of funds".

In response to a civil rights lawsuit by the United States Justice Department alleging that the Colorado City government, including law enforcement, was taking orders from the FLDS Church, Arizona Attorney General Tom Horne announced in July 2012 that he was allocating funding to allow the Mohave County Sheriff's Department to provide daily patrols in the town.

On March 20, 2014, a jury hearing the case of Cooke et al v. Colorado City, Town of et al ruled that the towns of Colorado City and Hildale had discriminated against Ronald and Jinjer Cooke because they were not members of the FLDS Church. The Cookes were awarded $5.2 million for "religious discrimination". The Cooke family had moved to the Short Creek area in 2008 but were refused access to utilities by the towns of Colorado City and Hildale. As a result of the ruling, Arizona Attorney General Tom Horne issued a press release stating that he "wants to eradicate discrimination in two polygamous towns" and believes that the court ruling will give him the tools to do it.

== Geography and climate ==
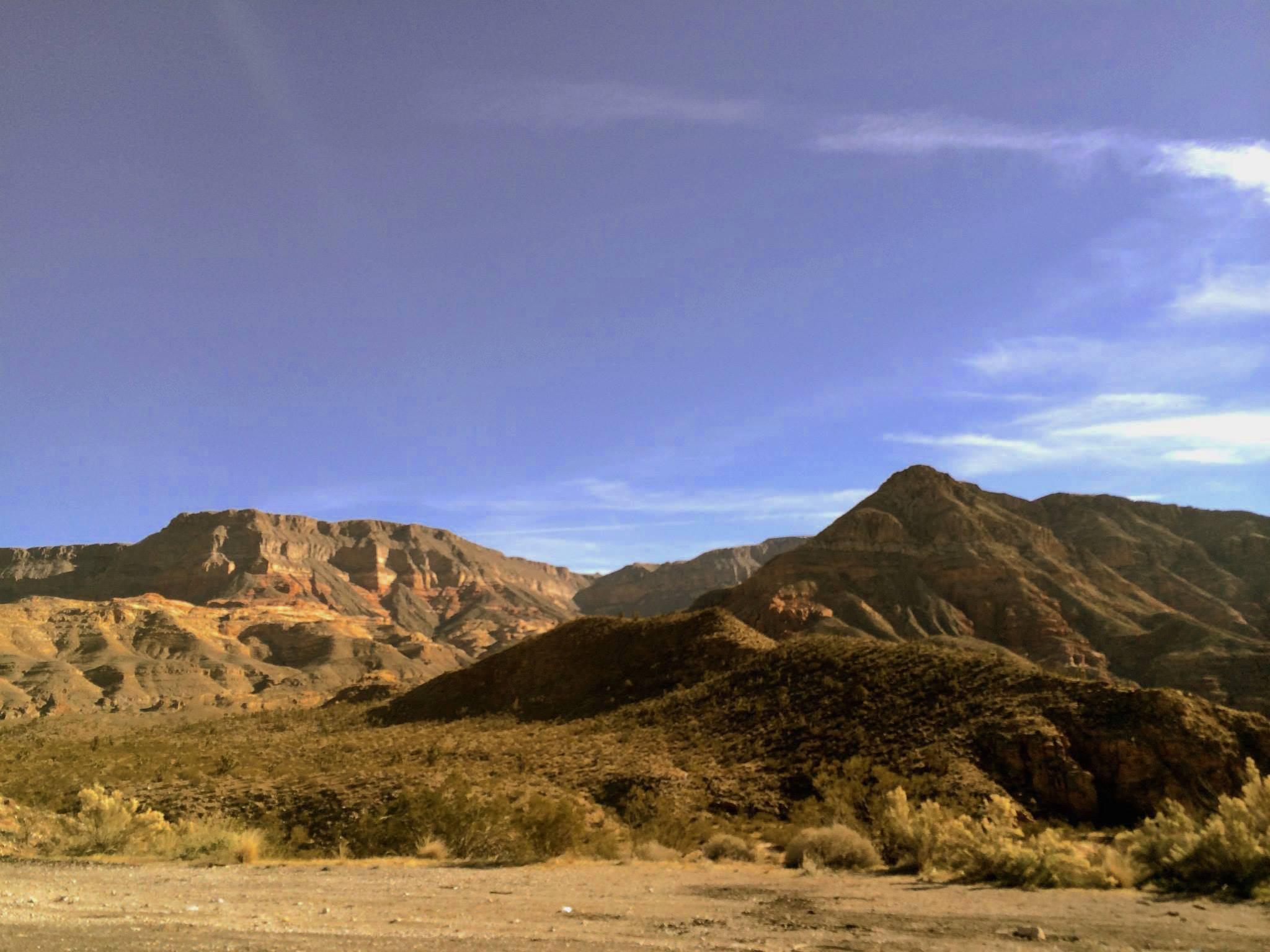
The landscape surrounding Colorado City in 2014

Colorado City is located in northeastern Mohave County. Its northern border is the Arizona–Utah state line, with the town of Hildale, Utah, to the north. Arizona State Route 389 passes through the center of town, leading east 31 miles (50 km) to Fredonia. To the north, Route 389 becomes Utah State Route 59, which leads northwest 22 miles (35 km) to Hurricane.

According to the United States Census Bureau, the town has a total area of 8.924 square miles (23.11 km^{2}), of which 0.008 square miles (0.02 km^{2}), or 0.07%, are water.

Colorado City has the typical cool semi-arid climate (Köppen BSk) of the interior Mountain West, with very warm to hot summers and cool to cold winters, typified by very large diurnal temperature ranges throughout most of the year. The hottest day on record was July 15, 2005, with 110 °F (43 °C). Rainfall is lowest from April to June, but is never particularly high on average, though during strong extratropical low pressure systems, as much as 5 inches (130 mm) may occasionally fall during a month. The wettest year has been 1998 with 27.48 inches (698.0 mm), whilst the driest year has been 1956 with 4.76 inches (120.9 mm). Snowfall is relatively light; the most in a month was in January 1982 with 29.0 inches (74 cm) and that winter had the most for a year with 46.5 inches (118 cm). The highest daily snow depth was however on February 2, 1979, with 13 inches (33 cm).

Climate data for Colorado City, Arizona (1991–2020 normals, extremes 1950–2012)
Month	Jan	Feb	Mar	Apr	May	Jun	Jul	Aug	Sep	Oct	Nov	Dec	Year
Record high °F (°C)	70 (21)	78 (26)	88 (31)	90 (32)	98 (37)	105 (41)	110 (43)	105 (41)	99 (37)	94 (34)	83 (28)	70 (21)	110 (43)
Mean maximum °F (°C)	62.0 (16.7)	66.2 (19.0)	74.0 (23.3)	82.2 (27.9)	90.7 (32.6)	98.6 (37.0)	102.5 (39.2)	99.0 (37.2)	94.3 (34.6)	85.1 (29.5)	72.2 (22.3)	62.0 (16.7)	103.0 (39.4)
Mean daily maximum °F (°C)	48.9 (9.4)	53.3 (11.8)	60.6 (15.9)	67.6 (19.8)	77.7 (25.4)	89.4 (31.9)	94.6 (34.8)	91.9 (33.3)	84.5 (29.2)	72.4 (22.4)	58.8 (14.9)	48.4 (9.1)	70.7 (21.5)
Daily mean °F (°C)	36.7 (2.6)	40.5 (4.7)	46.7 (8.2)	52.7 (11.5)	61.8 (16.6)	71.9 (22.2)	78.2 (25.7)	76.7 (24.8)	69.3 (20.7)	57.4 (14.1)	44.9 (7.2)	36.1 (2.3)	56.1 (13.4)
Mean daily minimum °F (°C)	24.5 (−4.2)	27.6 (−2.4)	32.9 (0.5)	37.8 (3.2)	46.0 (7.8)	54.3 (12.4)	61.7 (16.5)	61.6 (16.4)	54.2 (12.3)	42.4 (5.8)	31.0 (−0.6)	23.8 (−4.6)	41.5 (5.3)
Mean minimum °F (°C)	9.7 (−12.4)	13.6 (−10.2)	20.0 (−6.7)	25.9 (−3.4)	33.1 (0.6)	41.2 (5.1)	52.5 (11.4)	52.5 (11.4)	41.3 (5.2)	28.4 (−2.0)	15.8 (−9.0)	8.2 (−13.2)	5.0 (−15.0)
Record low °F (°C)	−11 (−24)	−4 (−20)	6 (−14)	13 (−11)	22 (−6)	28 (−2)	40 (4)	40 (4)	29 (−2)	6 (−14)	1 (−17)	−9 (−23)	−11 (−24)
Average precipitation inches (mm)	1.33 (34)	1.81 (46)	1.67 (42)	1.12 (28)	0.56 (14)	0.31 (7.9)	1.22 (31)	1.43 (36)	1.48 (38)	1.16 (29)	1.10 (28)	1.13 (29)	14.32 (362.9)
Average snowfall inches (cm)	2.9 (7.4)	3.6 (9.1)	1.1 (2.8)	0.6 (1.5)	0.0 (0.0)	0.0 (0.0)	0.0 (0.0)	0.0 (0.0)	0.0 (0.0)	0.4 (1.0)	0.7 (1.8)	3.1 (7.9)	12.4 (31.5)
Average precipitation days (≥ 0.01 inch)	5.6	7.5	6.3	4.7	3.2	2.6	4.8	6.5	4.1	4.8	4.0	5.1	59.2
Average snowy days (≥ 0.1 inch)	1.3	1.3	0.7	0.4	0.0	0.0	0.0	0.0	0.0	0.1	0.3	1.1	5.2
Source: National Oceanic and Atmospheric Administration (mean maxima/minima 1981–2010)

== Demographics ==
Colorado City, Arizona – Racial and ethnic composition Note: the US Census treats Hispanic/Latino as an ethnic category. This table excludes Latinos from the racial categories and assigns them to a separate category. Hispanics/Latinos may be of any race.
Race / Ethnicity (NH = Non-Hispanic)	Pop 2000	Pop 2010	Pop 2020	% 2000	% 2010	% 2020
White alone (NH)	3,191	4,783	2,414	95.71%	99.21%	97.42%
Black or African American alone (NH)	6	4	0	0.18%	0.08%	0.00%
Native American or Alaska Native alone (NH)	0	1	2	0.00%	0.02%	0.08%
Asian alone (NH)	3	1	2	0.09%	0.02%	0.08%
Native Hawaiian or Pacific Islander alone (NH)	7	0	0	0.21%	0.00%	0.00%
Other race alone (NH)	1	0	1	0.03%	0.00%	0.04%
Mixed race or Multiracial (NH)	29	4	35	0.87%	0.08%	1.41%
Hispanic or Latino (any race)	97	28	24	2.91%	0.58%	0.97%
Total	3,334	4,821	2,478	100.00%	100.00%	100.00%

Historical population
Census	Pop.	Note	%±
1980	1,439		—
1990	2,426		68.6%
2000	3,334		37.4%
2010	4,821		44.6%
2020	2,478		−48.6%
2022 (est.)	2,550	▲	2.9%
U.S. Decennial Census; 2020 Census

=== 2020 census ===
As of the 2020 census, Colorado City had a population of 2,478. The median age was 18.9 years. 47.5% of residents were under the age of 18 and 4.2% of residents were 65 years of age or older. For every 100 females there were 100.2 males, and for every 100 females age 18 and over there were 90.4 males age 18 and over.

0.0% of residents lived in urban areas, while 100.0% lived in rural areas.

There were 472 households in Colorado City, of which 64.4% had children under the age of 18 living in them. Of all households, 38.6% were married-couple households, 21.6% were households with a male householder and no spouse or partner present, and 26.1% were households with a female householder and no spouse or partner present. About 12.7% of all households were made up of individuals and 1.3% had someone living alone who was 65 years of age or older.

There were 561 housing units, of which 15.9% were vacant. The homeowner vacancy rate was 2.2% and the rental vacancy rate was 3.5%.

Racial composition as of the 2020 census
Race	Number	Percent
White	2,430	98.1%
Black or African American	0	0.0%
American Indian and Alaska Native	3	0.1%
Asian	2	0.1%
Native Hawaiian and Other Pacific Islander	0	0.0%
Some other race	4	0.2%
Two or more races	39	1.6%
Hispanic or Latino (of any race)	24	1.0%

=== 2000 census ===
As of the 2000 census, there were 3,334 people, 444 households, and 417 families residing in the town. The population density was 317.3 inhabitants per square mile (122.5/km^{2}). There were 457 housing units at an average density of 43.5 per square mile (16.8/km^{2}). The racial makeup of the town was 96.9% white, 0.2% black or African American, 0.1% Asian, 0.2% Pacific Islander, 1.8% from other races, and 0.9% from two or more races. Hispanic or Latino of any race were 2.9% of the population.

Of the 444 households, 83.1% had children under the age of 18 living with them, 85.8% were married couples living together, 3.6% had a female householder with no husband present, and 5.9% were non-families. 4.1% of all households were made up of individuals, and 1.1% had someone living alone who was 65 years of age or older. The average household size was 7.51 and the average family size was 7.58. Colorado City had the fourth-highest household size in the nation, based on the 2012 5-Year American Community Survey count of an average household size of 8.04 people by zip code tabulation area.

In the town, the population was spread out, with 60.4% under the age of 18, 11.4% from 18 to 24, 20.2% from 25 to 44, 6.3% from 45 to 64, and 1.7% who were 65 years of age or older. The median age was 14 years. For every 100 females, there were 102.7 males. For every 100 females age 18 and over, there were 91.3 males.

The median income for a household in the town was $32,826, and the median income for a family was $32,344. Males had a median income of $24,429 versus $22,969 for females. The per capita income for the town was $5,293. About 29.0% of families and 31.9% of the population were below the poverty line, including 34.5% of those under age 18 and 6.3% of those age 65 or over.

The Colorado City/Hildale, Utah area has the world's highest incidence of fumarase deficiency, an extremely rare genetic condition which causes severe intellectual disability. Geneticists attribute this to the prevalence of cousin marriage between descendants of two of the town's founders, Joseph Smith Jessop and John Y. Barlow; at least half the area's roughly 8,000 inhabitants are descended from one or both.

== Government and infrastructure ==
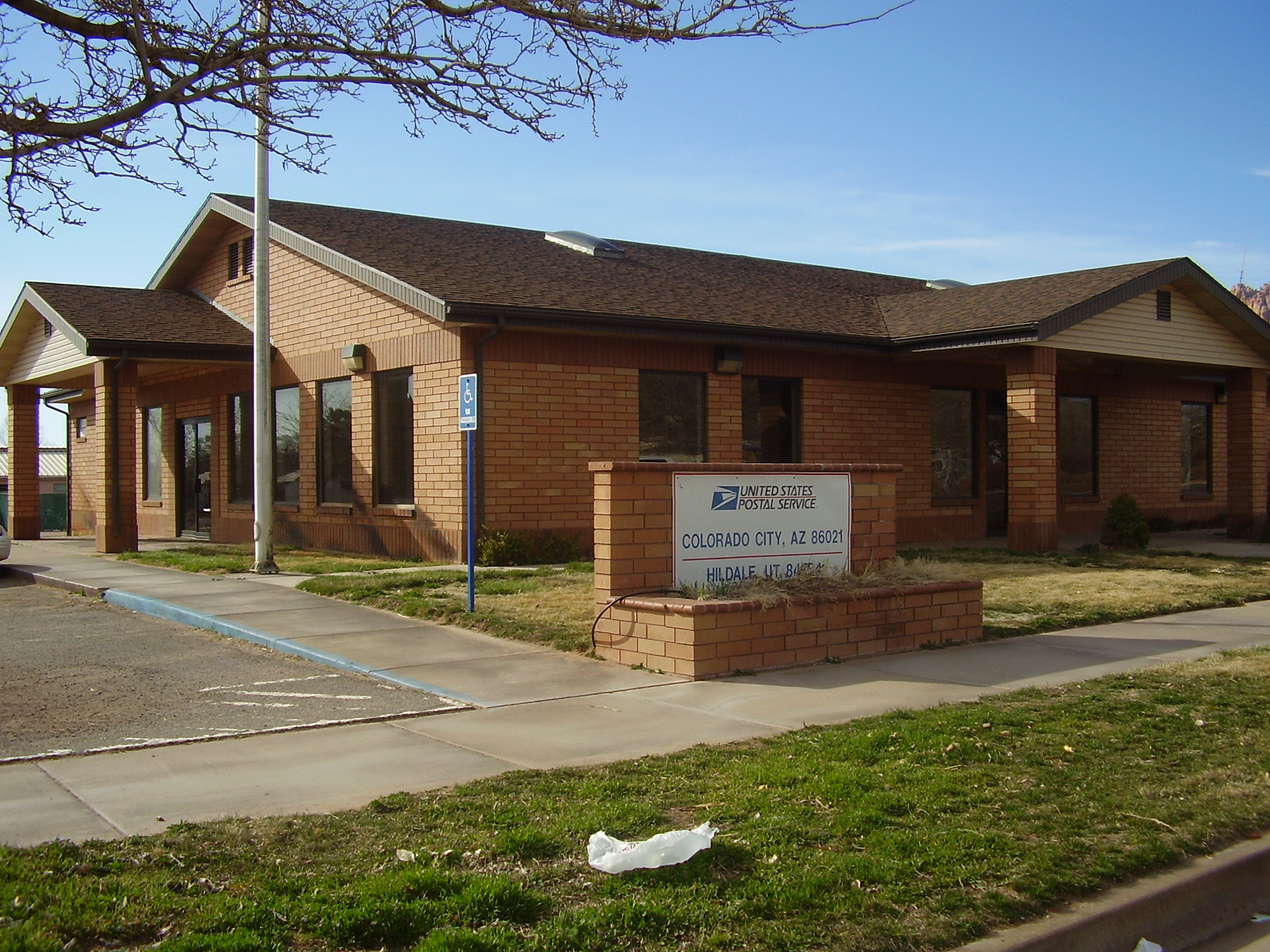
Colorado City, AZ/Hildale, UT Post Office

The United States Postal Service operates the Colorado City, AZ/Hildale, UT Post Office in Colorado City.

The town is policed by the Colorado City/Hilldale Police Department.

The former Leroy S. Johnson Meetinghouse is now used as a local community center.

The Isaac W. Carling Memorial Park is the main cemetery in the city.

== Education ==
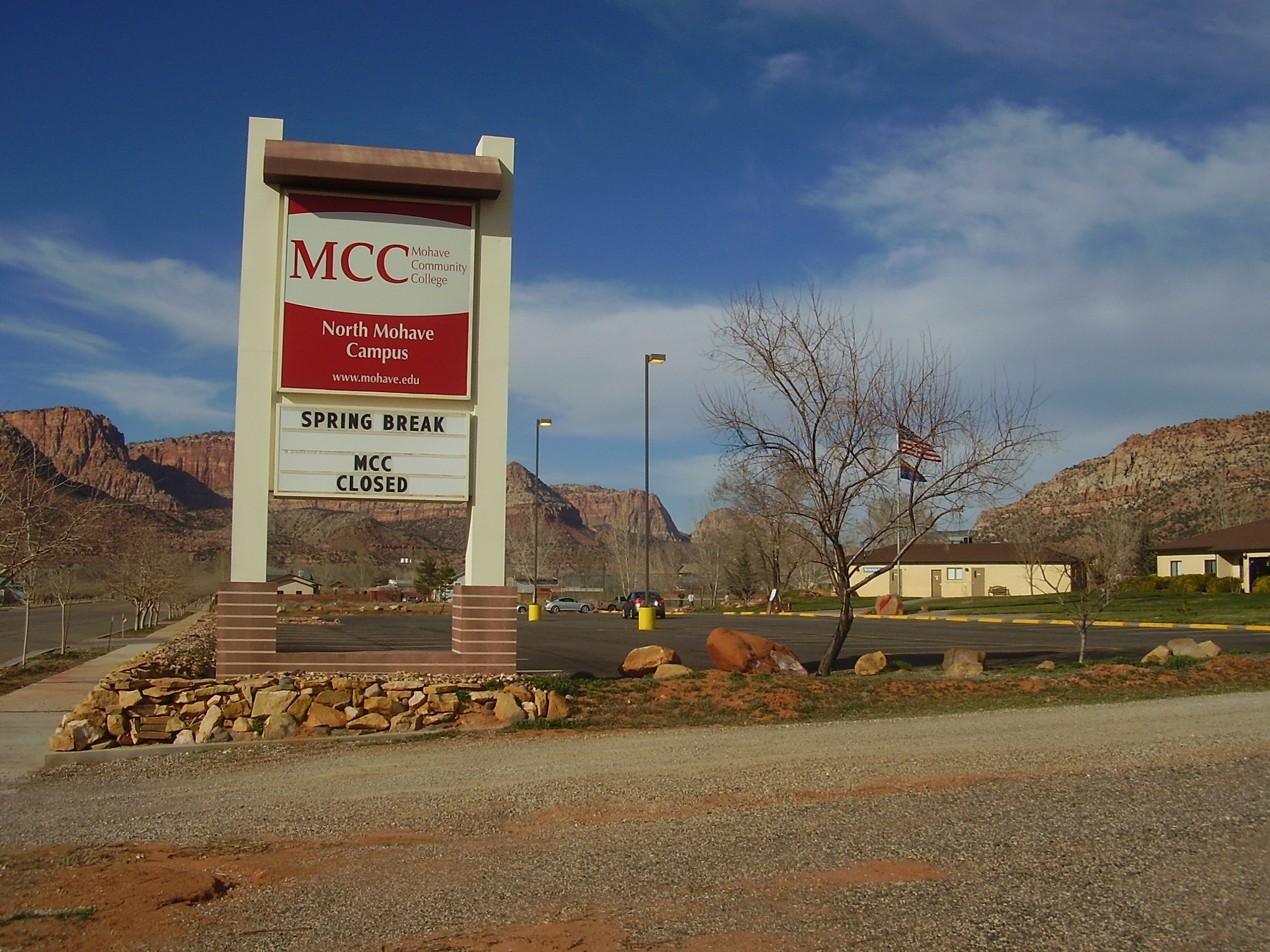
Mohave Community College North Mohave Campus

Colorado City is a part of the Colorado City Unified School District. There is only one school, the El Capitan School (formerly the Colorado City K–12 Public School), in Colorado City. Many FLDS-affiliated board members resigned due to the political takeover of the district.

The Arizona state government attempted to take over the district in 2005 due to mismanagement.

In addition to the district public school, there is a charter school, Masada Charter School, serving students in grades K–9. The charter school is outside of the Colorado City town limits in the community of Centennial Park.

The Mohave Community College North Mohave Campus is in Colorado City.

== Notable people ==
- Carolyn Jessop, author, social activist
- Flora Jessop, author, social activist
- Warren Jeffs, convicted sex offender and former leader of the Fundamentalist Church of Jesus Christ of Latter Day Saints
- Samuel Bateman, convicted sex offender and former leader of a splinter sect of the Fundamentalist Church of Jesus Christ of Latter Day Saints

== Twin city ==
- Hildale, Utah – just over the AZ/UT border
