= Mormon fundamentalism =

Advocates of some early Mormon doctrines

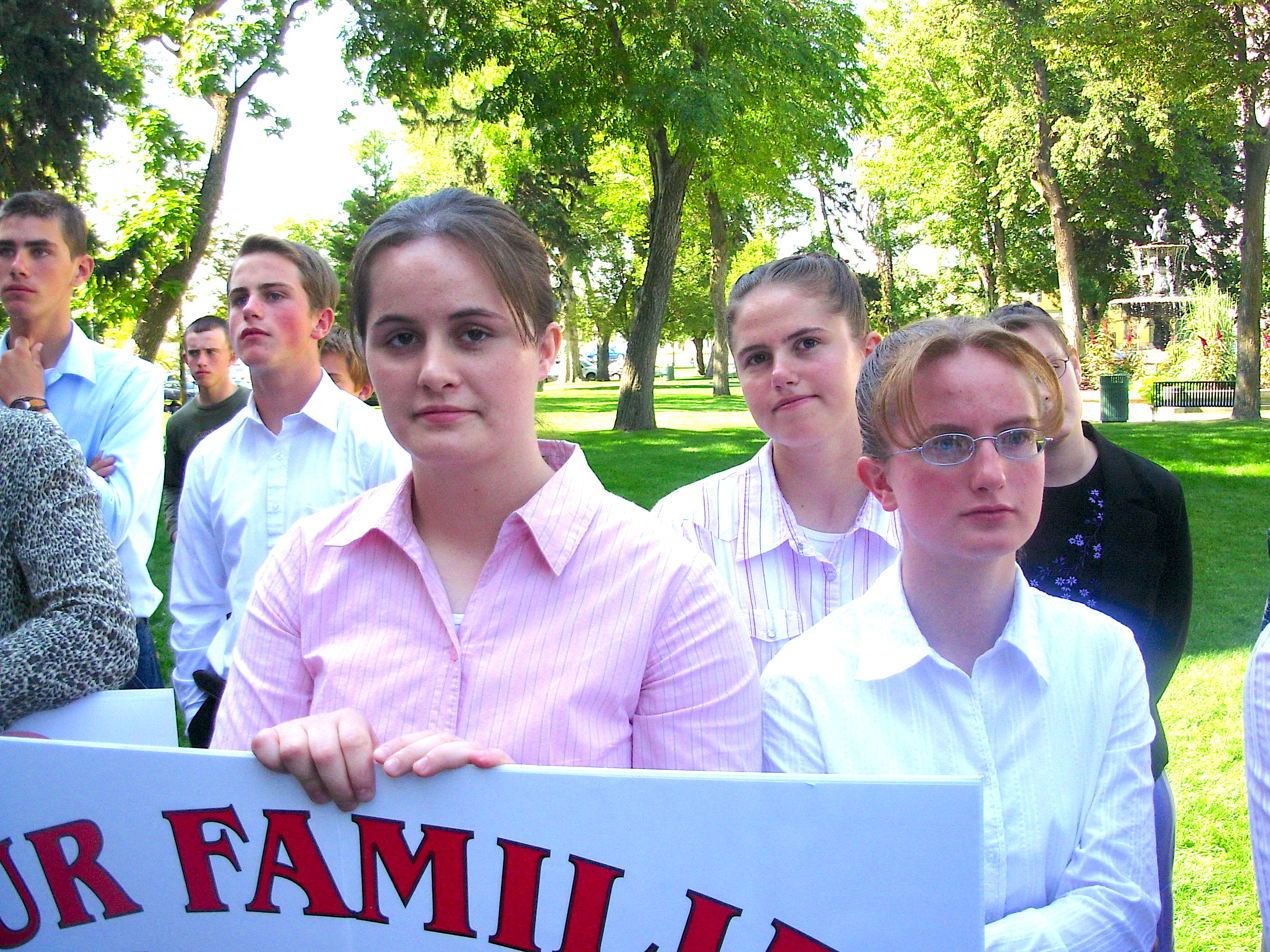
Various people from polygamous families demonstrate at a pro-plural marriage rally in Salt Lake City in 2006. Over 200 supporters of plural marriage attended the event.

Mormon fundamentalism (also called fundamentalist Mormonism) is a variant of Christian fundamentalism with belief in the validity of selected fundamental aspects of Mormonism as taught and practiced in the nineteenth century, particularly during the administrations of Joseph Smith, Brigham Young, and John Taylor, the first three presidents of the Church of Jesus Christ of Latter-day Saints (LDS Church). Mormon fundamentalists seek to uphold tenets and practices no longer held by mainstream Mormons. The principle most often associated with Mormon fundamentalism is plural marriage, a form of polygamy first taught in the Latter Day Saint movement by the movement's founder, Smith. A second and closely associated principle is that of the United Order, a form of egalitarian communalism. Mormon fundamentalists believe that these and other principles were wrongly abandoned or changed by the LDS Church in its efforts to become reconciled with mainstream American society.

There is no single authority accepted by all Mormon fundamentalists; viewpoints and practices of individual groups vary. Fundamentalists have formed numerous small sects, often within cohesive and isolated communities throughout the Mormon Corridor in the Western United States, Western Canada, and northern Mexico. Sources estimate the number of North American adherents to be between 20,000 and 60,000, (Note: Estimates of the number of Mormon fundamentalists include 20,000, 40,000, 50,000. and 60,000.) with about half of those living in polygamous households. One 2020 source estimated that about 75% of North American Mormon fundamentalists were affiliated with either the Fundamentalist Church of Jesus Christ of Latter Day Saints (FLDS), Apostolic United Brethren (AUB or Allred Group), or Latter Day Church of Christ (DCCS or Kingston Group).

Founders of mutually rival Mormon fundamentalist denominations include Lorin C. Woolley, John Y. Barlow, Joseph W. Musser, Leroy S. Johnson, Rulon C. Allred, Elden Kingston, and Joel LeBaron. The largest Mormon fundamentalist groups are the Fundamentalist Church of Jesus Christ of Latter-Day Saints (FLDS Church) and the Apostolic United Brethren (AUB).

== History ==
The LDS Church had covertly practiced plural marriage from the 1830s or early 1840s, but the precise origins and timelines are described as "murky". Plural marriage was publicly acknowledged in 1852 after the bulk of LDS members had migrated to Utah; was formally canonized in the Doctrine and Covenants in 1876; and was practiced by 20-30% of LDS households.

Plural marriage was controversial among the general American populace, and the official platorm statement of the Republican Party in 1856 characterised polygamy and slavery as "the twin relics of barbarism."

Under pressure from the U.S. federal government and opposition to Utah Territory becoming a state so long as polygamy was legal, LDS leadership began prohibiting the contracting of new plural marriages within the United States in 1890 after a decree by church president Wilford Woodruff. However, the 1890 manifesto did not dissolve or invalidate existing plural marriages and the practice continued underground in the U.S. and openly in Mormon colonies in northern Mexico and southern Alberta, Canada. According to some sources, many polygamous men in the United States continued to live with their plural wives with the approval of church presidents Woodruff, Lorenzo Snow, and Joseph F. Smith.

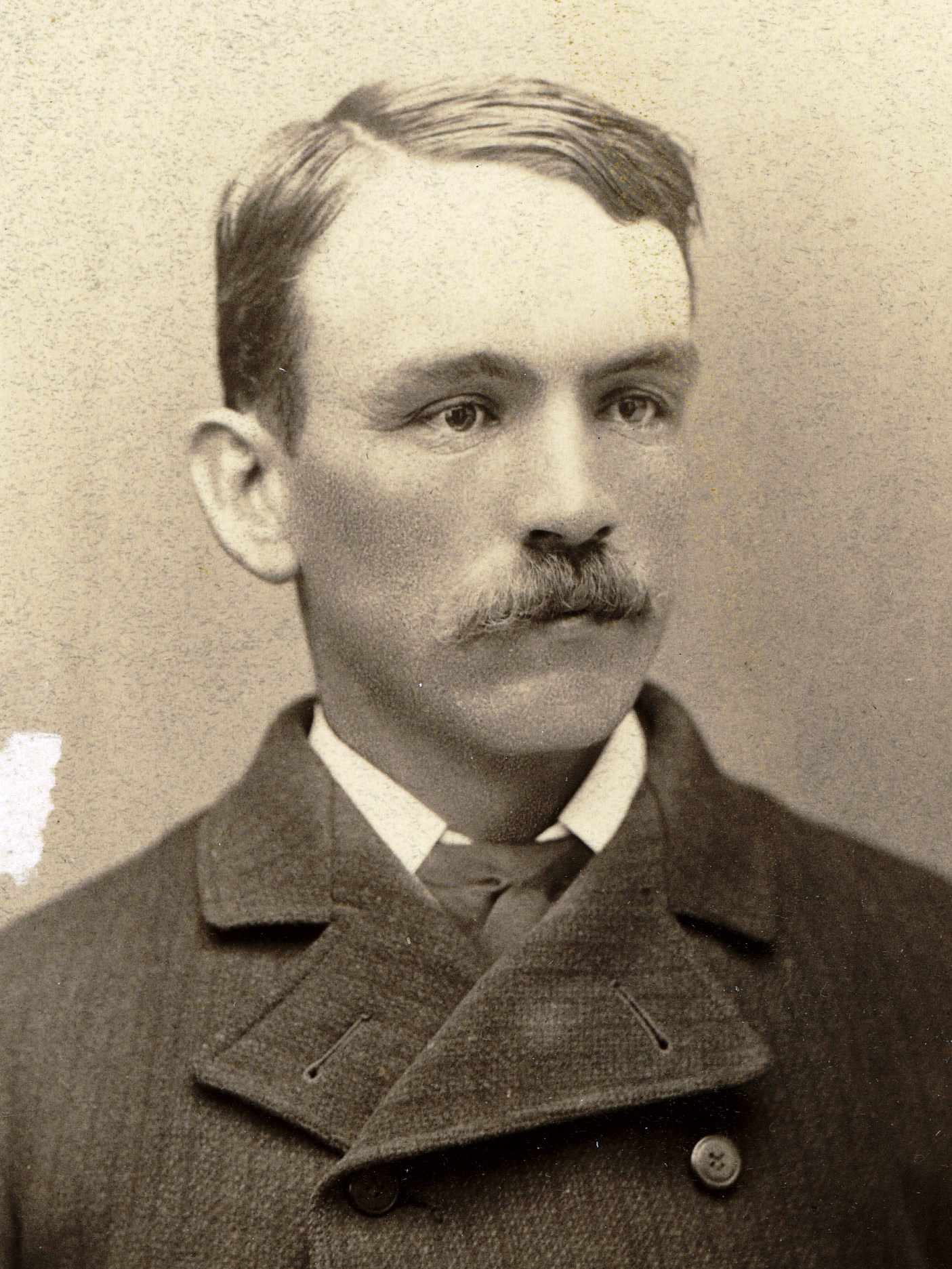
Lorin C. Woolley (1882) Known as the father of modern Mormon fundamentalism amongst most fundamentalists sects

Some fundamentalists have argued that the 1890 Manifesto was not a real revelation of the kind given by God to Joseph Smith, Brigham Young, John Taylor, and others, but that it was rather a politically expedient document intended by Woodruff to be a temporary measure until Utah Territory gained statehood. They make their argument based on textual evidence and the fact that the "Manifesto" is not worded in accordance with similar revelations in the LDS scriptures. This argument further holds that after joining the Union, Utah would have had the authority to enact its own laws with respect to marriage, rather than being bound by U.S. territorial laws that prohibited polygamy. Before statehood could be granted in 1896, however, the federal government required Utah to include a provision in its state constitution stating that "polygamous or plural marriages are forever prohibited." Fundamentalists (and many scholars of Mormon history) also believe that a primary impetus for the 1890 Manifesto was the Edmunds–Tucker Act of 1887, a stringent federal law that legally dissolved the LDS Church, disenfranchised women (who had been given the vote in Utah in 1870), and required voters to take an anti-polygamy oath before being permitted to vote in an election.

With the selection of Latter-day Saint Reed Smoot to be one of Utah's representatives to the U.S. Senate in 1903, national attention was again focused on the continuation of plural marriage in Utah, which culminated in the Reed Smoot hearings. In 1904, church president Joseph F. Smith issued a "Second Manifesto", after which time it became LDS Church policy to excommunicate those church members who entered into or solemnized new polygamous marriages. The seriousness with which this new measure was taken is evinced in the fact that apostle John W. Taylor, son of the church's third president, was excommunicated in 1911 for his continued opposition to the Manifesto.

Today, the LDS Church continues to excommunicate members who advocate early Mormon doctrines such as plural marriage, enter into or solemnize plural marriages (whether in the United States or elsewhere), or actively support Mormon fundamentalist or dissident groups. Although some LDS Church members continue to believe in the doctrine of plural marriage without practicing it, Joseph Smith's teachings on plural marriage remain part of the scriptural canon of the LDS Church. The LDS Church prevents any of its members who sympathize with Mormon fundamentalist teachings from entering its temples.

During the 1920s, a church dissenter named Lorin C. Woolley claimed a separate line of priesthood authority from the LDS Church's hierarchy, effectively setting in motion the development of Mormon fundamentalism. Most of the Mormon polygamous groups can trace their roots to Woolley's legacy.

For the most part, the Utah state government has left the Mormon fundamentalists to themselves, unless their practices violate laws other than those prohibiting bigamy. For example, there have been recent prosecutions of men who belong to fundamentalist groups for marrying underage girls. In one highly publicized 2004 case, a man and one of his polygamist wives lost custody of all but one of their children until the wife separated herself from her husband. The largest government effort to crack down on the practices of fundamentalist Mormons was carried out in 1953 in what is today Colorado City, Arizona, which became known as the Short Creek Raid.

Other fundamental doctrines of the Latter Day Saint movement besides polygamy, notably the United Order (communalism), while equally important in the practices of some fundamentalist sects, have not come under the same scrutiny or approbation as has plural marriage, and the mainline LDS Church has mostly ignored this aspect of fundamentalism; in any case, no revelation or statement condemning it has ever been issued.

== Distinctive doctrines and practices ==
Most Mormon fundamentalists embrace the term Fundamentalist (usually capitalized). Mormon fundamentalists share certain commonalities with other fundamentalist movements, but also possess some clear distinctions of their own.

Fundamentalists within the Mormon tradition do see religious authority as inerrant and unchanging, but tend to locate this authority within their view of "Priesthood", which is conceived of as more of a charismatic authority and often physical lineage than an external organization. In this view, ordination lineage becomes all-important and an external organization such as a church may "lose" its theological authority while the "priesthood" (conceived in this abstract and individualistic sense) may continue via an alternative lineage. Mormon fundamentalists frequently assert that priesthood is prior to the Church.

Unlike more prevalent Biblical (non-Mormon) fundamentalist groups, who generally base their authority on an unchanging and closed canon of scripture, Mormon fundamentalists generally hold to a concept of "continuing revelation" or "progressive revelation", in which the canon of scripture may be continually augmented through the sermons and teachings of prophets whose preaching guides the community.

Another of the most basic beliefs of Mormon fundamentalist groups is that of plural marriage, which many of them view as essential for obtaining the highest degree of exaltation in the celestial kingdom. Mormon fundamentalists dislike the term "polygamy" and view "polygyny" as a term used only by outsiders. They also refer to plural marriage generically as "the Principle", "celestial marriage", "the New and Everlasting Covenant", or "the Priesthood Work".

The practice of plural marriage usually differs little from the manner in which it was practiced in the nineteenth century. However, in some fundamentalist sects it is considered acceptable for an older man to marry underage girls as soon as they attain puberty. This practice, which is illegal in most states, apart from polygamy itself, has generated public controversy. Examples include the Tom Green case, and the case in which a man from the Kingston Group married his 15-year-old cousin, who was also his aunt. Other sects, however, do not practice and may in fact vehemently denounce underage or forced marriages and incest (for example, the Apostolic United Brethren.)

In addition to plural marriage, Mormon fundamentalist beliefs often include the following principles:

- the law of consecration also known as the United Order
- the Adam–God teachings taught by Brigham Young and other early leaders of the LDS Church
- the belief that Joseph Smith was the Holy Ghost incarnate
- the principle of blood atonement
- the exclusion of black men from the priesthood
- the belief that missionaries should teach "without purse or scrip"

Mormon fundamentalists believe both that these principles were accepted by the LDS Church at one time, and that the LDS Church wrongly abandoned or changed them, in large part due to the desire of its leadership and members to assimilate into mainstream American society and avoid the persecutions and conflict that had characterized the church throughout its early years.

== Terminology and relationship with the LDS Church ==
The term "Mormon fundamentalist" appears to have been coined in the 1940s by LDS Church apostle Mark E. Petersen to refer to groups who had left the LDS Church. However, Mormon fundamentalists do not universally embrace this usage and many simply consider themselves to be "Mormon". Today, the LDS Church considers the designation "Mormon" to apply only to its own members and not to members of other sects of the Latter Day Saint movement. One LDS leader went as far as claiming that there is no such thing as a "Mormon fundamentalist", and that using the two terms together is a "contradiction". The LDS Church suggests that the correct term to describe Mormon fundamentalist groups is "polygamist communities".

In rebuttal to this nomenclature argument, certain Mormon fundamentalists have argued that they themselves are in fact more correctly designated as Mormons in so far as they follow what they consider to be the true and original Mormon teachings as handed down from Joseph Smith and Brigham Young. Within this context, the LDS Church is often regarded by such fundamentalists as having abandoned several foundational aspects of Mormonism as noted above.

== Mormon fundamentalist sects ==
The majority of Mormon fundamentalists belong to sects that have separated themselves from the LDS Church. As such, most are considered to be "Brighamite" sects within the Latter Day Saint movement.

=== Apostolic United Brethren ===
The Apostolic United Brethren (AUB) is estimated to have about 5000 to 10000 members throughout Utah, Montana, Nevada, Arizona, Wyoming, Missouri, and Mexico and is perhaps the largest Mormon fundamentalist group. Several of its towns are organized into United Orders; the church has established a temple in Mexico, an Endowment House in Utah, and operates several schools.

The AUB emerged when their leader, Joseph W. Musser, ordained Rulon C. Allred as an apostle and counselor, which led to a split between Mormon fundamentalists in Salt Lake City and those in Short Creek, Arizona.

The AUB is one of the more liberal of the Mormon groups practicing plural marriage. The leaders of the AUB do not arrange marriages.

=== Fundamentalist Church of Jesus Christ of Latter-Day Saints ===
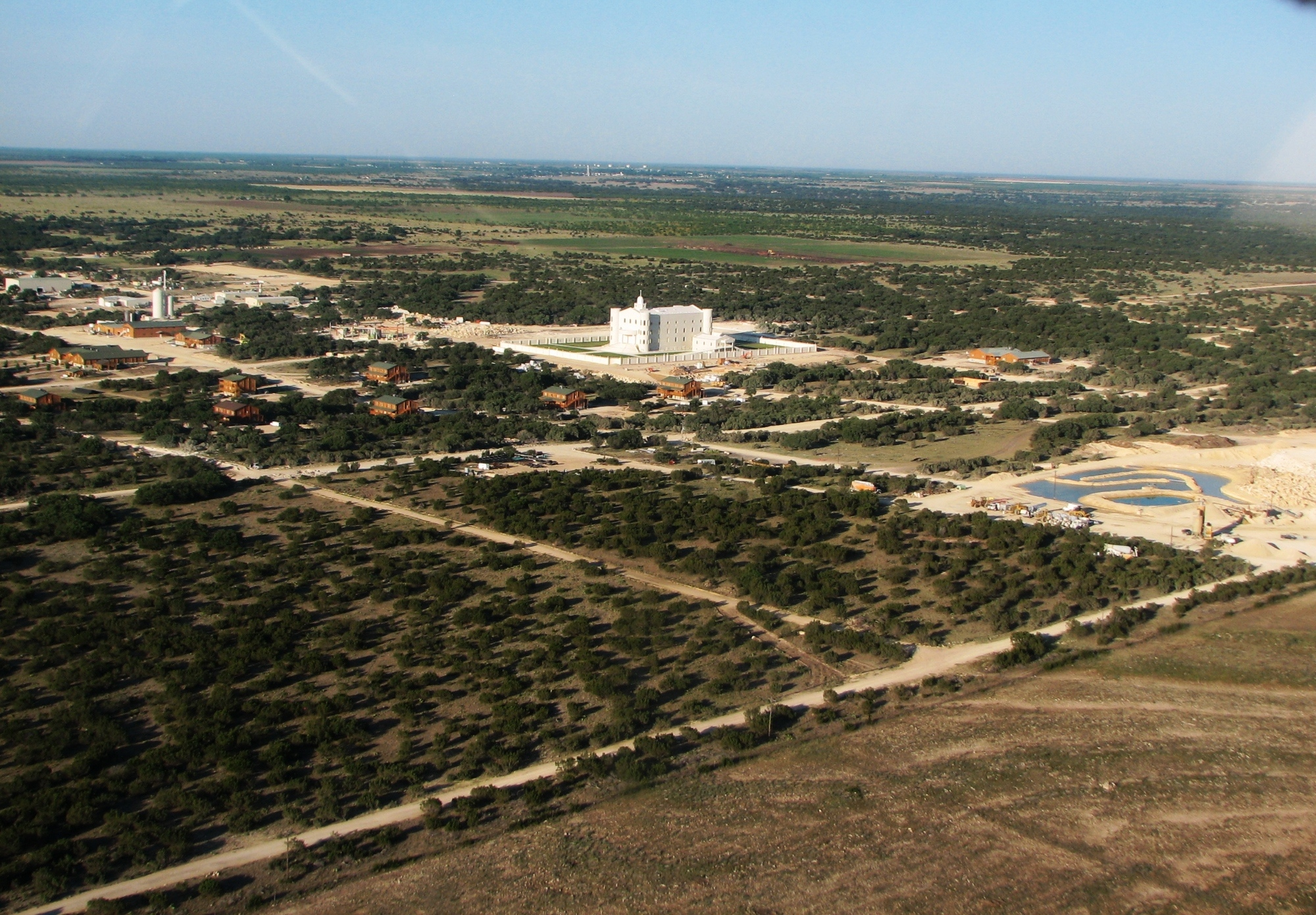
A view of the former FLDS compound in Eldorado, Texas

The Fundamentalist Church of Jesus Christ of Latter-Day Saints (FLDS Church) is estimated to consist of 6000 members. A succession crisis has been brewing in the church since 2002, when Warren Jeffs (convicted of accessory to rape and sentenced to life in prison in 2011), became president of the church. There has been extensive litigation regarding the church, as property rights of disaffected members are weighed against the decisions of church leaders who hold trust to the land their homes are built on. A large concentration of members lives in the twin cities of Colorado City, Arizona, and Hildale, Utah, as well as in Bountiful, British Columbia. The church built a temple near Eldorado, Texas. The members of the FLDS Church tend to be very conservative in dress and lifestyle.

Beginning April 4, 2008, over a four-day period, troopers and child welfare officials searched the church's YFZ Ranch and removed 416 children into the temporary custody of the State of Texas. Originally officials from the Texas Department of Family and Protective Services took 18 girls into temporary custody of the state, after responding to a phone call from the YFZ ranch alleging physical and sexual abuse of a 16-year-old girl, who also claimed to have been married at age 15 to a 49-year-old man. On the following day, Judge Barbara Walther of the 51st District Court issued an order authorizing officials to remove all children, including boys, 17 years old and under out of the compound. The children were being held by the Child Protective Services 45 miles away, north of the ranch. 133 women also voluntarily left the ranch with the children. On May 29, 2008 the Texas Supreme Court ruled that CPS must return all of the children. The court stated, "On the record before us, removal of the children was not warranted." The call that provoked the raid was a hoax. Despite this, investigations resulting from this raid resulted in charges against twelve men associated with the FLDS Church, six of which have resulted in convictions ranging from 5 to 75 years in prison.

The considerable hardship faced by wives and children pursuant to state evictions has been reported, with testimonies of those affected. The story of Warren Jeffs and the FLDS Church has been popularized in the Netflix documentary, "Keep Sweet, Pray and Obey". The treatment of the wives of Warren Jeffs has been discussed by testimony from escapees, who established a women's refuge in Church property.

=== Bountiful, British Columbia Community ===
The first member of the group that bought property near Lister was Harold (aka) Michael Blackmore, who moved there with his family in 1946. Other members of the church who believed in the principles of plural marriages soon followed. After Winston Blackmore became the bishop in the 1980s, the group took the name of Bountiful.

In 1998 the estimated population was 600 and has since grown to about 1,000. Most of the residents are descended from only half a dozen men. The current FLDS bishop is James Oler.

In 2002 the Mormon fundamentalists in Bountiful divided into two groups: about half are members of the Fundamentalist Church of Jesus Christ of Latter Day Saints (FLDS Church), and the other half are members of the Church of Jesus Christ (Original Doctrine) Inc.

==== Church of Jesus Christ (Original Doctrine) Inc. ====
The Church of Jesus Christ (Original Doctrine) Inc., is an FLDS-offshoot based on the teachings of Winston Blackmore, who split with the FLDS Church after concluding the president of the church, Warren Jeffs, had exceeded his authority and become too dictatorial. This group was formed in September 2002, when FLDS Church president Warren Jeffs excommunicated Winston Blackmore, who was Bishop of the Bountiful, British Columbia group of the FLDS Church for two decades. About 700 people continue to follow Blackmore, while about 500 follow Jeffs.

=== Latter Day Church of Christ (Davis County Cooperative Society or Kingston Group) ===
The Davis County Cooperative Society, known internally as "the Order" short for "the United Order", has a religious arm officially known as the Latter Day Church of Christ. The group is estimated to have approximately 3500-5000 members. This co-operative runs several businesses, including pawnshops and restaurant supply stores.

=== Righteous Branch of the Church of Jesus Christ of Latter-day Saints ===
The Righteous Branch of the Church of Jesus Christ of Latter-day Saints is a group of approximately 100 to 200 people; most live near Modena, Utah, or Tonopah, Nevada. The Righteous Branch was organized in 1978 by Gerald Peterson Sr., who claimed that he was ordained a High Priest Apostle by AUB leader Rulon C. Allred. Later, after he was murdered, Rulon C. Allred appeared to him as an angel to instruct him to preside over the keys of the priesthood. This church has built a pyramid-shaped temple and Gerald Peterson Jr. is their current leader. Like the AUB they are modern in their dress and do not allow girls under 18 to be married.

=== True and Living Church of Jesus Christ of Saints of the Last Days ===
The True and Living Church of Jesus Christ of Saints of the Last Days (TLC) is headquartered in Manti, Utah. Membership is estimated at 300 to 500. Organized in 1994, the TLC was a new "restoration" for the "very last days" before the Second Coming of Jesus. While the church initially grew rapidly, it has since stagnated and declined in numbers and converts since it ceased missionary efforts in 2000.

=== Centennial Park group ===
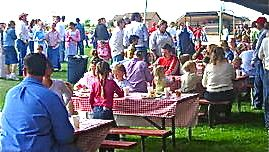
A community event in Centennial Park

About 1,500 people are members of a group located in Centennial Park, Arizona, called The Work of Jesus Christ. In the early 1980s there was a conflict of leadership in the FLDS Church. Some of the members were very unhappy with the changes being made by various influential men in the community. When the FLDS Church abandoned leadership by council and instituted a "one-man rule" doctrine, those who wanted to maintain leadership by a priesthood council founded Centennial Park in 1986, approximately 3 miles (5 km) south of the twin communities of Colorado City, Arizona, and Hildale, Utah. (Location of Centennial Park).

The name "Centennial Park" is a reference to the 1886 movement led by Lorin C. Woolley, which serves as the basis for fundamentalist claims of priesthood authority. Members of this group (referred to by members as "The Work") denounce all violence and abuse, do not permit marriage of young girls, and disavow the extreme practices of the FLDS Church. However, like the FLDS Church, they practice a form of arranged marriage. They dress in modern, modest attire.

The Centennial Park group has built a meetinghouse for weekly services and a private high school. A charter school was built in 2003 for the town's growing elementary-age population. About 300 members of this group live in the Salt Lake Valley, where they hold meetings monthly. Members living in Salt Lake City often travel to Centennial Park every month to help in building the community. This group is led by a Priesthood council.

The group was profiled on the ABC television program Primetime in a story entitled, The Outsiders, and also on The Oprah Winfrey Show.

=== The Church of Jesus Christ of Latter-day Saints and the Kingdom of God ===
The Church of Jesus Christ of Latter-day Saints and the Kingdom of God is based in the Salt Lake Valley, and has around 200 members. The sect was founded by Frank Naylor and Ivan Nielsen, who split from the Centennial Park group, another fundamentalist church. This group trace their authority through Alma A. Timpson and Frank Naylor. The church is estimated to have 200-300 members, most of whom reside in the Salt Lake Valley. Most—if not all—of the members of this group were previously associated with the Centennial Park or FLDS Church. The group is also known as the "Third Ward" or the "Naylor group", after Frank Naylor.

=== School of the Prophets ===
The School of the Prophets has its headquarters in the Salem, Utah area. In 1968 Robert C. Crossfield published revelations he had stated he received in the Book of Onias. Among other things, the Book chastised certain LDS Church leaders. Crossfield was excommunicated from the mainline LDS Church in 1972. In 1982 Crossfield established a School of the Prophets, overseen by a president and six counselors. Crossfield's continuing revelations were later named the Second Book of Commandments; it has 275 sections, dating from 1961 to 2018. There is a 2BC Website maintained by Crossfield devotees, which contains information on his teachings.

Brothers Ron and Dan Lafferty were affiliated with the Crossfield group, serving as for a month as counselors in the Provo, Utah School of the Prophets in March 1984. Four months after being removed from the School of Prophets following a dispute with Crossfield from the school, they murdered their sister-in-law and her young daughter. Both Lafferty brothers were found guilty; Dan was sentenced to life with no parole, and Ron was sentenced to death but died of age-related complications before execution was carried out.

=== Independent Mormon fundamentalists ===
There is a small movement of independent Mormon fundamentalists. Independents do not belong to organized fundamentalist groups and do not generally recognize any man as their prophet or leader. Because Independents are not one cohesive group, they are very diverse in their beliefs and interpretations of Mormonism; therefore, their practices vary. Many Independents come from a background in the LDS Church, while others come from other Christian or Mormon fundamentalist backgrounds.

Independents rely on personal inspiration and revelation to guide them; there is no ecclesiastical structure among the Independents, although Independents often socialize with each other and may meet together for religious services.

Statistically, it is difficult to estimate how many Independents there are, but a 2014 estimate indicates that there may be more independent fundamentalists than there are in any one of the formally organized polygamous groups and may number as many as 15,000. According to this informal survey, about half of Mormon fundamentalists, both those in groups and those outside of groups, currently practice polygamy. There are many Independents in Utah, Arizona, Missouri and Brazil.

Two prominent figures among independent fundamentalists are the late writer Ogden Kraut as well as his plural wife Anne Wilde, both of whom maintained friendships with other independent fundamentalists and some members of the organized groups. Kraut justified his habits by arguing that John Taylor's purported 1886 revelation authorized only continuing plural marriage, with "no mention of setting up a church, taking tithing, having weekly meetings, or setting up a colony somewhere".

== See also ==
- Big Love, an HBO series about a fictional independent polygamous Mormon fundamentalist family
- Brown v. Buhman
- Darger family
- Alex Joseph
- Ervil LeBaron
- Lost boys (Mormon fundamentalism)
- Messenger magazine, a fundamentalist publication
- Sister Wives
- Sons of Perdition
- Under the Banner of Heaven, a non-fiction book by Jon Krakauer
