= Roy Jeffs =

Mormon church figure (1992–2019)

- Born: Leroy Barlow Jeffs; June 5, 1992; Sandy, Utah
- Died: May 29, 2019 (aged 26); Salt Lake City, Utah
- Known for: Leaving FLDS; Accusations against his father
- Relatives: Warren Jeffs (father); Rulon Jeffs (grandfather); Nephi Jeffs (uncle); Lyle Jeffs (uncle); Seth Jeffs (uncle); Brent W. Jeffs (cousin); Rachel Jeffs (sister)

Leroy "Roy" Barlow Jeffs (June 5, 1992 – May 29, 2019) was a former member of the Fundamentalist Church of Jesus Christ of Latter-Day Saints (FLDS Church). He was one of Warren Jeffs's over 60 children. Jeffs left the FLDS and was among the first of his father's children to accuse him of sexual abuse.

He died by suicide at age 26.

== Life ==
Born in Sandy, Utah to Gloria Barlow and Warren Jeffs. At the time, his father was serving as the principal of a FLDS private school, and his grandfather, Rulon Jeffs, was prophet of the FLDS Church. Jeffs would have three younger full siblings (Richard, Rulon, and Patricia), and 50 half siblings. He and his family moved to Short Creek Community in 1998.

Although forbidden from having access to television or toys, Jeffs described a happy childhood, spending time landscaping and gardening with his mother. But he felt neglected and shunned by his father, and witnessed the psychological abuse of his mother (who was not one of Warren's favored wives).

When he was around 10 years old, his father began to separate him from the rest of the family and community. Jeffs was first sent away, along with his mother, when he was 12. Three days after his father's arrest in 2006, at 14, he was sent to a ranch in Wyoming, without his mother. "I was sent from a house in hiding, to a land of refuge, which were the compounds, and that’s where it was just a lot of hard labor".

Jeffs was allowed to rejoin the family at the YFZ Ranch but stayed only three weeks because of a confession to his father that he was attracted to some of his father's wives (who were close to his age). He believed the confession was necessary because "God revealed to [Warren] all of the details of your life."

Jeffs was able to reunite with his family, returning to the YFZ Ranch in December 2008, when all of Warren Jeffs’ family members were sent there. He was sent to Short Creek in 2010. And in 2012, he was sent out to work at many FLDS enclaves around the United States clearing land, building houses, tending herds, and learning to repair appliances.

Jeffs was working for a church-owned company which was building a hotel in downtown Des Moines, Iowa where he hadn't talked to his family in two years, didn't get along with any of his co-workers, and hadn't been paid in months. Feeling "super alone," on February 10, 2014, he left the FLDS by running off of the job site. He purchased a one-way bus ticket to Salt Lake City.

Jeffs was among the first of Warren Jeffs’ children to leave his father's church.

=== Post-FLDS ===
"[It’s] important to remember that, in those communities, there are good people who believe what they’re doing is right. [It’s] important to look on those in the FLDS church as individuals and view them with compassion."
— Roy Jeffs

Jeffs had dismissed the accusations of sexual abuse leveled against his father, until three of his sisters left the church and told him what they had experienced. Jeffs said his father also had sexually abused him before he was six years old, but hadn't thought of it that way until after hearing his sisters' experiences. "Basically, he was like 'Don't ever do this,' then he touched me."

Jeffs started a new life for himself, exploring the secular world as an adult, discovering a love for Disney movies, Taylor Swift, and Friends. Jeffs was a member of the LGBT community.

At the time of his death, his mother was in hiding and Roy had not seen her in six years.

=== Death ===
Jeffs died by suicide at his home in Salt Lake City. Funeral services were scheduled for June 8, 2019, at Larkin Sunset Gardens Mortuary in Sandy, Utah. His family established a Go Fund Me account to help pay for funeral costs.

== See also ==
- Current state of polygamy in the Latter Day Saint movement
- Mormon fundamentalism
- List of former Mormon fundamentalists
- Lost boys (Mormon fundamentalism)
