= Wendell Loy Nielsen =

American Mormon leader

Wendell Loy Nielsen (born c. 1941) was the president of the Fundamentalist Church of Jesus Christ of Latter-Day Saints (the FLDS Church), replacing Warren Jeffs, at that time imprisoned on charges related to sexual assaults against minors.

== Church leadership ==
Nielsen served as first counselor to Warren Jeff; as well as Warren's father, Rulon Jeffs.

In September 2007, Warren Jeff, the president of the FLDS Church was convicted on two first-degree felony charges of accomplice rape and received two five-to-life prison sentences. Shortly after, Jeff resigned as church's president. Later the church filed the paperwork with the Utah Department of Commerce to certify that Nielsen (following the resignation of Jeffs) was named the President of the Fundamentalist Church of Jesus Christ of Latter-Day Saints.

While both Rulon and Warren Jeffs were FLDS presidents and regarded as prophets, Nielsen's role as the president was reportedly limited to managing church's corporate entity. "The state paperwork is a legal formality that clarifies that Nielsen has the authority to make decisions related to church business and legal dealings", church attorney Rodney Parker said."

In July 2010, Warren Jeffs' rape as an accomplice conviction was overturned due to a flaw in jury instructions, and a new trial was ordered. In August 2011, Warren Jeffs was found guilty of another charge: sexual assault of a minor, for raping a 12-year-old and a 15-year-old; for which he was sentenced to life in prison, plus twenty years. Form the prison, Jeffs reportedly removed Nielsen as the church president and retook the control of the FLDS Church in January 2011.

Nielsen was convicted and imprisoned in 2012; and his status in the FLDS Church since is unclear.

== Arrest, trial and conviction ==
During the April 2008 raid on the YFZ ranch, Texas law enforcement seized FLDS Church records, including church's marriage registry.

Based on this records, in November 2008, Texas authorities indicted Nielson with three counts of bigamy for purporting to marry persons other than his spouse while being legally married. According to the documents, Nielsen allegedly married 34 women in addition to his legal wife, and performed the ceremonies in which Warren Jeffs married girls as young as 12 year old.

In March 2012, Nielsen was convicted on three counts of bigamy and sentenced to 10 years in prison, as well as ordered to pay a $10,000 fine for each count.

== See also ==
- List of Mormon fundamentalist leaders
- Mormon fundamentalism

Fundamentalist Church of Jesus Christ of Latter Day Saints titles
Preceded by Rulon T. Jeffs	Prophet; Warren Jeffs; 2002 – present With: Disputed interruptions by: Lyle Jeffs (designated acting president); William E. Jessop (once momentarily successor); Merril Jessop (once de facto head); Wendell L. Nielsen (one time head of temporal affairs)	Succeeded by incumbent Warren Jeffs
Corporation of the Fundamentalist Church of Jesus Christ of Latter Day Saints titles
Preceded by Rulon T. Jeffs	President; 2002 – December 4, 2007	Succeeded by Wendell L. Nielsen
Preceded by Wendell L. Nielsen	President; January 28, 2011 – present	Succeeded by incumbent
