= Seth Jeffs =

American religious official

Seth Steed Jeffs
- Other name: Seth Steed
- Known for: Being a Fundamentalist Church of Jesus Christ of Latter-Day Saints official
- Parent(s): Rulon Jeffs and Marilyn Steed
- Relatives: Warren Jeffs, Nephi Jeffs, Lyle Jeffs, Brent W. Jeffs, Helaman Jeffs

Seth Jeffs is an American high-ranking official in the Fundamentalist Church of Jesus Christ of Latter-Day Saints. He is known for harboring his brother Warren Jeffs during the federal manhunt to arrest him.

== Family ==
Seth Steed Jeffs was born to FLDS Prophet Rulon Jeffs and Marilyn Steed, one of his many wives. This made him the full brother of Warren, Nephi, and Lyle Jeffs, as all three shared the same father and mother. The Jeffs family is considered "polygamist royalty" and FLDS members consider their members to be of "royal blood." After Rulon's death in 2002, Warren took over being prophet and president of the FLDS church. This made Seth the brother of the current prophet and son of the former prophet, solidifying his place in the powerful Jeffs family.

Of his relationship with Warren, Seth is said to be "very close" to his brother and described by veteran investigator Gary Engels as "a very intelligent man, very guarded".

Seth is the uncle of Brent W. Jeffs, who mentions Seth in his memoir Lost Boy.

== 2005 arrest ==
On October 28, 2005, Pueblo County police deputies were called about a possible drunk driver near the city of Pueblo, Colorado, around 3 am. After pulling the driver over, police found Nathaniel Steed Allred driving the SUV and Seth laying in the back on a mattress. Once authorities realized who Seth was, they obtained a search warrant to search the SUV. In the car officials found US$140,000 in cash, numerous letters addressed to Warren, cell phones, and $7,000 in prepaid debit cards.

After both Allred and Seth were arrested, Allred told the authorities that his cousin Seth had paid him $5,000 for "sexual services" and that he was only a driver for the evening.

Seth was put on $25,000 bail and went before U.S. magistrate judge O. Edward Schlatter to hear the charge that he did "knowingly harbor and conceal Warren Steed Jeffs". Warren was on the FBI's Top 10 Most Wanted List and evading capture at the time. Seth was accompanied to the hearing by his brother Lyle and entered his plea through his lawyer. During the trial in July 2006, U.S. District Judge Robert E. Blackburn accepted Seth's guilty plea of harboring a fugitive. Seth refused to give up Warren's location and instead took the federal charge.

Seth was sentenced to three years' probation and a $2,500 fine. In his court statement, Seth stated "I knew what I did was wrong as I was doing it, but I didn't realize the severity of what I was doing. I did all I can to remove myself from this situation ... I never want to find myself in that situation again."

== YFZ Ranch raid ==
Seth attended many of the child custody hearings resulting from the April 2008 YFZ Ranch raid at the Tom Green County Courthouse. During the custody trials, Seth was represented by attorney Carl Kolb. One of Jeffs's wives was represented by Nancy DeLong.

To confirm paternity of the children, since many FLDS members would not cooperate and authorities were often given fake names, the court ordered parents, including Seth, to provide blood samples.

At the time of the raid, Seth had eighteen children. Among Seth's many children to be seized were three boys that he was allowed to take home on June 3, 2008. Of the experience, Seth stated his sons were treated well and that "They're glad to be going home." No children were permanently removed from Jeffs.

== Minnesota Land Purchase ==
In early 2019, it was reported that Jeffs had purchased 40 acres of land, to the east of Grand Marais, Minnesota. As of June 2020, construction on the site have halted due to wetlands compliance laws.

== South Dakota Compound ==
Jeffs leads the 140-acre FLDS compound located to the south-west of Pringle, South Dakota. The compound has come under scrutiny for not registering vital records such as births and deaths. In January 2021, a judge ordered the community to sell the compound in order to settle a lawsuit.

== Personal life ==
As of June 2020, Seth lives in Menomonie, a small town in Dunn County Wisconsin.

As of March 2009, Seth had seven wives and nineteen children. During an interview in his home with Lisa Ling, when asked if he wanted any more children, Seth stated, "Every child is a precious gift sent from our Heavenly Father, and that's what plural marriage is all about." His house, which was featured on Oprah, was located in the Texas FLDS compound known as YFZ Ranch.

As of May, 2008, Seth had seven children with wife Kathryn: Melanie, Matthew, Suzion, Generous, David, Samuel, and Jeremiah. Attached to the October 2016 court filing on behalf of Seth, all those children (except Samuel) are named with the parents and others as claimants in the household for a SNAP programme food stamp benefits claim dated April 2016 (in addition to claims for Elisha and Jerusha Jeffs stated in the claim as born a month apart from each other in 2011 and a Melinda Jeffs born the same year as Matthew (2001) as members of the household).

Seth's other home in Colorado City, Arizona is officially owned by the FLDS trust United Effort Plan. In 2013, FLDS Bishop and one-time de facto leader William E. Jessop tried to force Seth out of the home so he could move in. The home, which is surrounded by walls with mounted cameras, is on the FLDS compound. It was reported that Seth was not leaving the house as Jessop had demanded.

In his book Prophet's Prey: My Seven-Year Investigation Into Warren Jeffs and the Fundamentalist Church of Latter-Day Saints, author Sam Brower accused Seth of being a courier for Warren and bringing him young brides while Warren was in hiding. He continues that Seth confused "gentiles" (the FLDS term for anyone not of FLDS faith) by using his middle name Steed as his last name to avoid scrutiny.
