= Merril Jessop =

American Mormon bishop (1935–2022)

Head of the Fundamentalist Church of Jesus Christ of Latter-Day Saints (de facto)
- December 4, 2007 – February 2011
- Predecessor: Warren Steed Jeffs
- Successor: Warren Steed Jeffs

Personal details
- Born: Frederick Merril Jessop; December 27, 1935; Salt Lake City, Utah, United States
- Died: February 28, 2022 (aged 86); Cedar City, Utah, United States
- Spouse(s): Foneta Marie Stokes Cook; Ruth Pugh Steed; Barbara Steed; Carolyn Bistline Blackmore (former); Tammy Lauritzen Barlow; Ireta Cathleen Hammon Barlow; Lorraine Steed and several others
- Children: 54 total 10 children by Foneta Cook; 16 children by Ruth Steed; 14 children by Barbara Steed; 8 children by Carolyn Blackmore; 1 child by Tammy Barlow; 5 children by Cathleen Barlow
- Parents: Richard Seth Jessop and Ida Johnson

Merril Jessop (December 27, 1935 – February 28, 2022) was a high-ranking bishop in the Fundamentalist Church of Jesus Christ of Latter-Day Saints, commonly referred to as the FLDS Church. He was briefly the de facto leader of the FLDS. Jessop was also in charge of the YFZ Ranch during the 2008 raid.

== Early life ==
Jessop was born in Salt Lake City to Ida Johnson and Richard Seth Jessop, a son of Joseph Smith Jessop.

== Bishop in the FLDS ==
Jessop was a lifelong member of the church, as his father and grandfathers were former high-ranking FLDS officials. Jessop is connected by a nebulous series of marriages to the Jeffs family; several of Jessop's daughters and at least one of his wives were previously the plural wives of Rulon Jeffs while at least eleven of Jessop's daughters and two of his granddaughters became plural wives to Warren Jeffs, several of them while they were underage. One of his daughters, Merrianne, was married to Jeffs three weeks after her twelfth birthday, a ceremony over which Jessop himself presided. Another daughter, Naomie, was one of Jeffs' favorite wives and was with him at the time of his capture by police.

While he was imprisoned, Warren Jeffs reportedly designated William E. Jessop as the rightful successor to the FLDS Church presidency. However, William Jessop remained at official church headquarters in Hildale, Utah. News reports suggested a possible shift of the church's headquarters to Eldorado, Texas, where a temple has been built by FLDS Church members at the YFZ Ranch. As the bishop of the church at YFZ, it appeared that Merril Jessop was the de facto president and the most powerful person in the FLDS Church, until February 2011.

Jessop was removed as bishop by Jeffs in February 2011.

== Personal life ==
One of Jessop's former wives, Carolyn Jessop, wrote a memoir in 2007 about their 17-year marriage, which had begun when she was 18 and he was 50. The book includes dozens of allegations of spousal and child abuse, both emotional and physical. Carolyn Jessop left the FLDS Church in 2003 and, after a custody battle with Merril Jessop, won full custody of their 8 children. She is the second woman to leave an FLDS community and gain full custody of all her children, although her eldest daughter Betty decided, after turning 18, to return to her father at the Yearning for Zion Ranch in Texas. Betty Jessop vehemently denies her mother's accusations. In 2009 Carolyn Jessop also won a child-support judgment against Merril Jessop in the approximate amount of $148,000 for support he failed to provide his children from 2003 to 2009. As of February 2010, Merril Jessop had still not paid any of the child support he owed. According to Carolyn's attorney, Natalie Malonis, he can be jailed for contempt for this failure.

According to his former wife's memoir, Jessop was the father of more than 50 biological children, all by his first six wives. His senior wife, Faunita, mother of 10 of Jessop's children, suffered from mental illness; she was abandoned by the roadside when the group moved to Texas, and she became a ward of one of her grandchildren who was living in the mainstream-Mormon community. Jessop is believed to have taken many more wives following Carolyn's departure. According to his ex-wife's book, Jessop had nebulous business interests that included construction and hotels, and had suffered from major heart problems.

In a National Geographic article published in February 2010, Jessop both praised and discussed his troubled relationship with Faunita (spelled 'Foneta' in the article). Over 5,000 people were in attendance at Faunita Jessop's funeral. "My hand is a bit sore today," Merril was quoted as saying at the end of the funeral after greeting all those who came.

== See also ==
- Colorado City, Arizona
- Mormon fundamentalism
- Placement marriage

Fundamentalist Church of Jesus Christ of Latter-Day Saints titles
Preceded by Rulon T. Jeffs	Prophet; Warren Jeffs; 2002 – present With: Disputed interruptions by: Lyle Jeffs (designated acting president); William E. Jessop (once momentarily successor); Merril Jessop (once de facto head); Wendell L. Nielsen (one time head of temporal affairs)	Succeeded by incumbent Warren Jeffs
