= Nephi Jeffs =

FLDS Leader

Nephi Steed Jeffs
- Occupation: Personal secretary
- Known for: Involvement with and relation to the FLDS Jeffs family
- Parent(s): Rulon Jeffs and Marilyn Steed
- Relatives: Warren Jeffs, Lyle Jeffs, Seth Jeffs, Brent W. Jeffs

Nephi Jeffs is an American Fundamentalist Church of Jesus Christ of Latter Day Saints leader. He is the bishop of the Short Creek Stake, and is his brother Warren Jeffs's personal secretary.

== Family ==
Nephi Steed Jeffs was born to the polygamous FLDS prophet Rulon Jeffs and his fourth wife Marilyn Steed. He is the full brother of Warren, Lyle, and Seth Jeffs among others. Members of the Jeffs family are considered polygamist elite and FLDS members consider their members to be of "royal blood." Being the son of Rulon Jeffs and the brother of Warren Jeffs secured Nephi's place in the FLDS hierarchy.

As of May 2008, Nephi had acquired 14 wives. Of members of his ward listed on records obtained by a federal investigation, Nephi had the second highest number of wives. Church elder Wendell Nielsen had the most wives listed at 21, while the third highest number of wives in the ward was Isaac Jeffs, another Jeffs brother, with 10.

== In the FLDS ==
Rulon Jeffs's secretary had always been Rebecca Musser's "sister-wife Mother" Noreen. In Musser's memoir The Witness Wore Red, she describes how Noreen was abruptly replaced with Nephi, who reported to Warren instead of Rulon. After Rulon died and Warren solidified power, Nephi continued being his secretary and personal confidant, also acting as a general personal assistant.

During the April 2008 raid of YFZ Ranch in Eldorado, Texas, Nephi was listed in a federal search warrant. The state's motion to seize property included some of Nephi's personal photographs.

As of 8 August 2016, Nephi Jeffs was named as the presiding Bishop of the Short Creek Stake, following his Brother Lyle Jeffs fleeing from the US judicial system.

== Warren Jeffs's incarceration ==
After Warren was apprehended and incarcerated in 2006, Nephi frequently visited Warren in jail. Of the ten trips that he made to see Warren, he was accompanied on eight of them by Lindsay Barlow, another FLDS member who acted as Nephi's security. Barlow also accompanied Nephi to the courtroom hearings as security.

While Warren was being held at the Purgatory Jail in Hurricane, Utah, he said to Nephi that he was not the true prophet and had taken power even though he "was not called of God." Nephi said he was, and Warren told him to spread the news to his followers. Nephi did not distribute the 25 January video as Warren said he should and it later became public. Jeffs said that Warren was "being tested by the Lord" and told Warren that his followers "will not forsake you."

During Warren's incarceration, Nephi "was responsible for transcribing, decoding and delivering all of Warren's messages."

== Legal issues ==
On 9 April 2015, U.S. District Judge David Sam held Nephi Jeffs in contempt of court. In 2012, the United States Department of Labor began an investigation into the role of the FLDS Church and Jeffs in suspected child labor violations. A CNN report said that children were used to harvest nuts at the Southern Utah Pecan Ranch in 2012. Judge Sam ruled that Nephi and Lyle Jeffs disobeyed subpoenas requiring them to answer questions from Labor Department investigators.
