= Brent W. Jeffs =

American author

- Occupations: Author, advocate
- Known for: Leaving FLDS; memoir
- Works: Lost Boy
- Children: 1
- Relatives: Rulon Jeffs (grandfather); Warren Jeffs (uncle); Nephi Jeffs (uncle); Lyle Jeffs (uncle); Seth Jeffs (uncle)

Brent W. Jeffs is an American author, advocate, and member of the influential Jeffs family of the Fundamentalist Church of Jesus Christ of Latter-Day Saints (FLDS Church).

Jeffs wrote the memoir Lost Boy with author Maia Szalavitz, which was released on May 19, 2009. The book is a depiction of life within the FLDS Church and his ostracism from the organization at a young age. The title of the book comes from the term "the lost boys", which refers to the many young men expelled from the FLDS Church. Jeffs is a grandson of FLDS prophet Rulon Jeffs, nephew to imprisoned FLDS prophet Warren Jeffs and leader Lyle Jeffs, and his mother is the daughter of another non-FLDS prophet as well.

Brent was born to Ward Jeffs, son of Rulon. Ward had three wives, two of whom were sisters. Between these marriages, Brent had nineteen siblings. Ward eventually left the church, leaving Brent in the FLDS community per Brent's request. Eventually, Brent left the compound and moved into a small apartment with four of his older brothers, where they experimented with alcohol, drug use, and partying.

In 2004, Brent named Warren as the perpetrator in a civil lawsuit seeking damages for sexual abuse he had suffered as a boy. Lost Boy depicts much of the sexual abuse that was inflicted upon him beginning at ages five or six. The memoir also includes abuse from Warren's brothers and other family members.

Brent has appeared on the NPR radio show Fresh Air, hosted by interviewer Terry Gross, the television show Polygamy: What Love Is This?, Hannity, and Dr. Phil, with each appearance having to do with the FLDS and polygamy. In each appearance, Brent discussed the dangers of the FLDS lifestyle and abuse from Warren and other influential FLDS Church leaders.

Since releasing his memoir, Brent has married and had a daughter. They live in Salt Lake City, Utah.

== See also ==
- Current state of polygamy in the Latter Day Saint movement
- Mormon fundamentalism
- List of former Mormon fundamentalists
