= William E. Jessop =

American Mormon Fundamentalist leader

William Edson Jessop (born William Edson Timpson) is a leader in the Mormon fundamentalist movement.

In a January 2007 telephone conversation between Jessop and church president Warren Jeffs, Jeffs suggested that Jessop was the rightful leader of the Fundamentalist Church of Jesus Christ of Latter-Day Saints (FLDS Church). In a jailhouse visit with his brother Nephi, Jeffs reportedly stated that "Brother William E. Jessop has been the prophet" of the FLDS Church since the death of Rulon Jeffs.

== Family background ==
Jessop is the son of Alma A. Timpson and one of his wives, Kathy. In the mid-1980s, Timpson had a falling out with FLDS Church leader Leroy S. Johnson and left the FLDS Church to start the schismatic Centennial Park Group. However, his wife Kathy refused to follow him, and she and her children remained with the FLDS Church members. Kathy became the wife of Fred Jessop, and William adopted his stepfather's surname.

== Claim to leadership ==
Prior to his death, Rulon Jeffs had instructed his son Warren Jeffs to ordain William Jessop to be a counselor to Fred Jessop, who was a bishop in the FLDS Church in Hildale, Utah. Warren Jeffs has claimed that when he performed this ordination, he made William Jessop an apostle—the highest priesthood ordination in the church—and that this ordination gave Jessop a right to lead the FLDS Church.

Fundamentalist Church of Jesus Christ of Latter Day Saints titles
Preceded by Rulon T. Jeffs	Prophet; Warren Jeffs; 2002 – present With: Disputed interruptions by: Lyle Jeffs (designated acting president); William E. Jessop (once momentarily successor); Merril Jessop (once de facto head); Wendell L. Nielsen (one time head of temporal affairs)	Succeeded by incumbent Warren Jeffs
