= The Eldorado Success =

Eldorado Success
- Publisher: Randy Mankin
- Editor: Randy Mankin
- Founded: 1901
- Headquarters: 204 S. Main Eldorado, TX 76936
- Circulation: 957 (as of 2023)
- Website: myeldorado.net

The Eldorado Success has been the local newspaper for Eldorado, Texas since 1901. The newspaper played a prominent role in 2008 when the Yearning for Zion Ranch was exposed north of Eldorado. This was shown in the 2022 Netflix documentary “Keep Sweet: Pray and Obey”.
