= Warren Jeffs =

American sex offender and cult leader (born 1955)

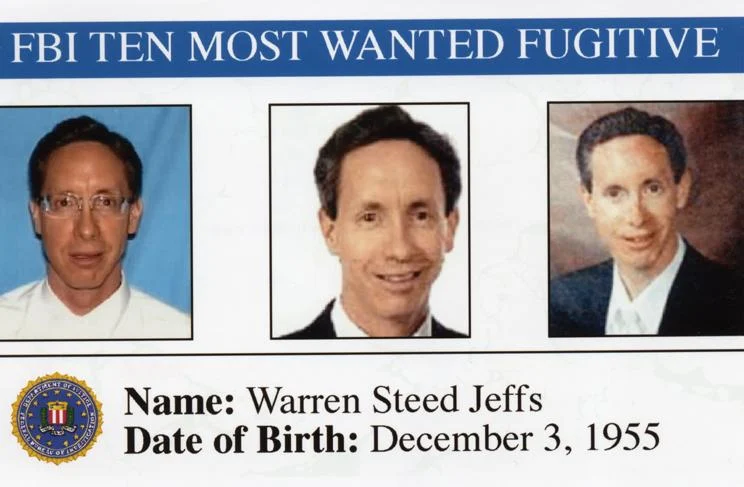

FBI Ten Most Wanted Fugitive

Description
- Born: Warren Steed Jeffs; 3 December 1955 (age 70); Sacramento, California, U.S.
- Occupation: Leader of the Fundamentalist Church of Jesus Christ of Latter-Day Saints
- Parents: Rulon Jeffs and Merilyn Steed
- Spouse: 78 including Naomi Jeffs (née Jessop)
- Children: More than 60, including Helaman Jeffs, Rachel Jeffs and Roy Jeffs

Status
- Convictions: Texas: Aggravated sexual assault of a child; Sexual assault of a child; Utah: Child rape as an accomplice (2 counts; overturned)
- Penalty: Texas: Life imprisonment with the possibility of parole after 27 years; Utah: Life imprisonment with the possibility of parole after 10 years (overturned)
- Status: Incarcerated
- Added: May 6, 2006
- Number: 482
- Captured

Warren Steed Jeffs (born December 3, 1955) is an American cult leader and convicted child sex offender. He is the president of the Fundamentalist Church of Jesus Christ of Latter-Day Saints, a polygamous cult based in Arizona and is serving a life sentence in Texas for child sexual assault after two convictions in 2011. The FLDS Church was founded in the early 20th century when its founders deemed the renunciation of polygamy by the Church of Jesus Christ of Latter-day Saints (LDS Church) to be apostasy. The mainstream LDS Church disavows any connection between it and the FLDS Church, although there are significant historical ties.

In 2006, Jeffs was placed on the FBI's Ten Most Wanted List for his flight from the charges that he had arranged illegal child marriages between his adult male followers and underage girls in Utah. In 2007, Arizona charged him with eight additional counts in two separate cases including incest and sexual conduct with minors.

In September 2007, Jeffs was convicted of two counts of rape as an accomplice, for which he was sentenced to imprisonment for 10 years to life in Utah State Prison. The conviction was overturned by the Utah Supreme Court in 2010 due to flawed jury instructions. He was extradited to Texas, where he was found guilty of sexual assault of a minor for raping a 15-year-old child bride; and aggravated sexual assault against a child for raping a 12-year-old child bride, for which he was sentenced to life in prison, plus 20 years and fined $10,000. Jeffs is incarcerated at the Louis C. Powledge Unit of the Texas Department of Criminal Justice near Palestine, Texas.

== Early life ==
Warren Steed Jeffs was born in Sacramento, California, on December 3, 1955 to Rulon Jeffs and Merilyn Steed. He was born more than two months prematurely and grew up outside of Salt Lake City, Utah. In 1976, the year he turned 21, Warren Jeffs became the principal of Alta Academy, an FLDS private school at the mouth of Little Cottonwood Canyon. He served as school principal for twenty years and was known for being "a stickler for the rules and for discipline." His father Rulon Jeffs became the president of the Fundamentalist Church of Jesus Christ of Latter-Day Saints (FLDS Church) in 1986 and had 19 or 20 wives and approximately 60 children. According to former church members, he eventually had 78 wives.

== Church leadership ==
Prior to his father's death in 2002, Jeffs held the position of counselor to the church leader. He became Rulon Jeffs' successor with his official title in the FLDS Church becoming "President and Prophet, Seer and Revelator" as well as "President of the Priesthood". The Revelator was the head of the organization of all adult male church members who were deemed worthy to hold the priesthood, a tradition carried on in the Latter Day Saint movement.

Rulon's death and Warren Jeffs's ascension to the leadership position caused a split in the FLDS Church between Jeffs's followers and the followers of Winston Blackmore, the long-time bishop of the Bountiful, British Columbia group of the FLDS Church. More than half of the Canadian branch members left the FLDS Church to stay with Blackmore as their leader, and Jeffs excommunicated Blackmore in September 2002. After Rulon died, Warren told the high-ranking FLDS officials, "I won't say much, but I will say this, hands off my father's wives." When addressing his father's widows he said, "You women will live as if Father is still alive and in the next room." Within a week he had married all but two of his father's wives; one refused to marry Jeffs and was subsequently prohibited from ever marrying again, while the other, Rebecca Wall, fled the FLDS compound. Naomi Jessop, one of the first of Rulon's former wives to marry Jeffs, subsequently became his favorite wife and confidant. As the sole individual in the FLDS Church with the authority to perform marriages, Jeffs was responsible for assigning wives to husbands. He also had the authority to discipline male church members by "reassigning their wives, children and homes to another man."

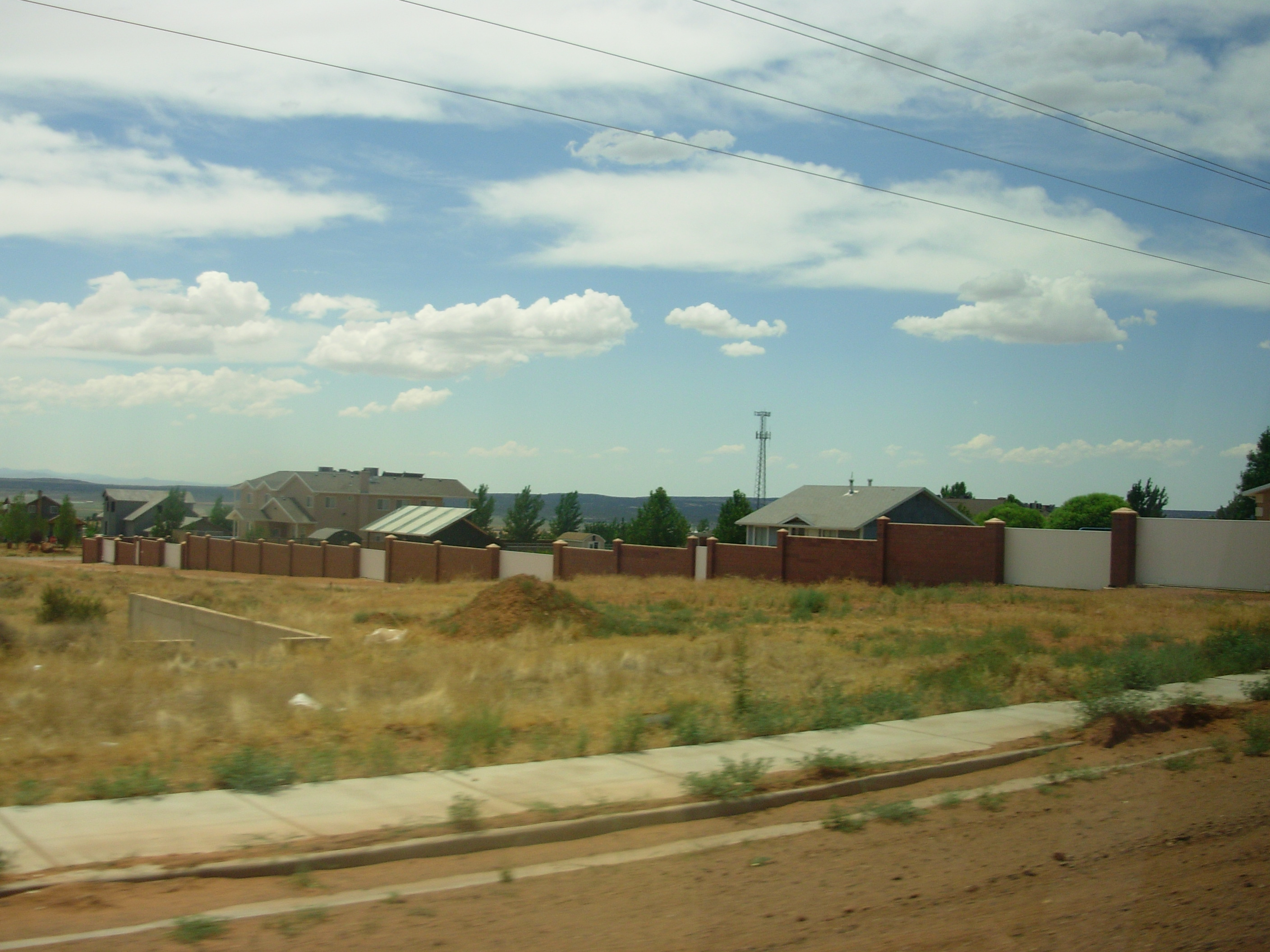
Former home of Jeffs in Colorado City, Arizona

Until courts in Utah intervened, Jeffs controlled almost all of the land in Colorado City, Arizona, and Hildale, Utah, which was part of a church trust called the United Effort Plan (UEP). The land has been estimated to be worth over $100 million. All UEP assets were put in the custody of the Utah court system pending further litigation. As the result of a November 2012 court decision, much of the UEP land is to be sold to those who live on it.

In January 2004, Jeffs expelled a group of 20 men from the Short Creek Community, including the mayor, and reassigned their wives and children to other men in the community. Jeffs, like his predecessors, continued the standard FLDS and Mormon fundamentalist tenet that faithful men must follow what is known as the doctrine of plural marriage in order to attain exaltation in the afterlife. Jeffs specifically taught that a devoted church member is expected to have at least three wives in order to get into heaven, and the more wives a man has, the closer he is to heaven.

=== Changes in location and leadership ===
Before his 2006 arrest, Jeffs had last been seen on January 1, 2005 near Eldorado, Texas, at the dedication ceremony of the foundation of a large FLDS temple on the YFZ Ranch. The ranch came into the public eye on April 7, 2008, when Texas authorities conducted a raid and took legal custody of 416 children, in response to a March 31 phone call alleging physical and sexual abuse on the ranch. The caller claimed to be a 16-year-old girl married to a 50-year-old man, and stated that she had given birth to his child a year prior. Residents, however, told authorities that there was in fact no such girl, and the calls were ultimately traced to 33-year-old Rozita Swinton, totally unconnected to the FLDS Church, and known for repeated instances of filing false reports. Nevertheless, Texas authorities continued to investigate whether Swinton's claims were a hoax. The women and children who were suspected of being minors were returned after Texas courts established that the state had not presented sufficient evidence of abuse to have removed them.

On June 10, 2006, Arizona Attorney General Terry Goddard told the Deseret News that he had heard from several sources that Jeffs had returned to Arizona, and had performed marriage ceremonies in a mobile home that was being used as a wedding chapel. On March 27, 2007, the Deseret News reported that Jeffs had renounced his role as prophet of the FLDS Church in a conversation with his brother Nephi. Nephi quoted him as saying he was "the greatest of all sinners" and that God had never called him to be a prophet. Jeffs presented a handwritten note to the judge at the end of trial on March 27, saying that he was not a prophet of the FLDS Church. On November 7, the Washington County, Utah, Attorney's Office released video of jailhouse conversations between Nephi and Jeffs, in which Jeffs renounces his prophethood, claiming that God had told him that if he revealed that he was not the rightful prophet, and was a "wicked man", he would still gain a place in the telestial kingdom. Jeffs also admits to what he calls "immoral actions with a sister and a daughter" when he was 20 years old. Other records show that while incarcerated, Jeffs tried to kill himself by banging his head against the walls and trying to hang himself.

Jeffs formally resigned as President of the FLDS Church effective November 20, 2007. In an email to the Deseret News, Jeffs's attorneys stated: "Mr. Jeffs has asked that the following statement be released to the media and to members of the Fundamentalist Church of Jesus Christ of Latter-Day Saints: Mr. Jeffs resigned as President of the Corporation of the President of The Fundamentalist Church of Jesus Christ of Latter-Day Saints Inc." The statement did not address his ecclesiastical position as prophet of the FLDS Church, and many in the FLDS communities still regard him as the prophet and their current leader. There are also reports that Jeffs admitted his position of prophet in the FLDS Church was a usurpation in a conversation to his brother, and declared that "Brother William E. Jessop has been the prophet since [my] Father's passing", though Jeffs's attorneys have claimed he misspoke. In early 2011, Jeffs retook legal control of the denomination.

== Convictions for sex crimes ==
=== Allegations and fugitive from justice ===
In July 2004, Jeffs's nephew, Brent Jeffs, filed a lawsuit alleging that Warren Jeffs had raped him in the FLDS Church's Salt Lake Valley compound in the late 1980s. Together with author Maia Szalavitz, Brent wrote the memoir Lost Boy, which recounts alleged incidents of child sexual abuse inflicted upon him by Jeffs, his brothers, and other family members, committed when Brent was aged 5 or 6. Brent's brother Clayne died by suicide after accusing Jeffs of sexually assaulting him as a child. Two of Jeffs's nephews and two of Jeffs's own children have also publicly claimed to have been sexually abused by him.

In June 2005, Jeffs was charged in Mohave County, Arizona with sexual assault on a minor and with conspiracy to commit sexual misconduct with a minor for allegedly arranging in April 2001 a marriage between a then-14-year-old girl and her 19-year-old first cousin, Allen. The young girl, Elissa Wall (then known as "Jane Doe IV," and the younger sister of Rebecca Wall), testified that she begged Rulon Jeffs to let her wait until she was older or choose another man for her. The elder Jeffs was apparently "sympathetic," but his son was not, and she was forced to go through with the marriage. Wall alleged that Allen often raped her and that she repeatedly miscarried. She eventually left Allen and the community.

In July 2005, the Arizona Attorney General's office distributed wanted posters offering $10,000 for information leading to Jeffs's arrest and conviction. On October 28, Warren Jeffs's brother Seth was arrested under suspicion of harboring a fugitive. During a routine traffic stop in Pueblo County, Colorado, police found nearly $142,000 in cash, $7,000 worth of prepaid debit cards and personal records. During Seth's court case, FBI Agent Andrew Stearns testified that Seth had told him that he did not know where his older brother was and that he would not reveal his whereabouts if he did. Seth was convicted of harboring a fugitive on May 1, 2006. On July 14, he was sentenced to three years probation and a $2,500 fine.

On April 5, 2006, Utah issued an arrest warrant for Jeffs on felony charges of accomplice rape of a teenage girl between 14 and 18 years old. Shortly after, on May 6, the FBI placed Jeffs on its Top Ten Most Wanted Fugitives list, offering a $60,000 reward. He was the 482nd fugitive placed on the list. The reward was soon raised to $100,000, and the public was warned that "Jeffs may travel with a number of loyal and armed bodyguards." On June 8, 2006, Jeffs returned to Colorado City to perform more "child-bride marriages." On May 27, 2008, The Smoking Gun released images of Jeffs with two underage wives, one of whom was 12 years old, celebrating first wedding anniversaries in 2005 and 2006.

=== Arrest, trial, and convictions ===
On August 28, 2006, around 9 p.m. PDT, Jeffs was pulled over on Interstate 15 in Clark County, Nevada, by highway trooper Eddie Dutchover because the temporary license plates on his red 2007 Cadillac Escalade were not visible. One of Jeffs's wives, Naomi Jessop, and his brother Isaac were with him. Jeffs possessed four computers, sixteen cell phones, disguises (including three wigs and twelve pairs of sunglasses), and more than $55,000 in cash. Jeffs's wife and brother were questioned and released.

In a Nevada court hearing on August 31, Jeffs waived any challenge to extradition and agreed to be returned to Utah to face two first-degree felony charges of accomplice rape. Each charge carries an indeterminate penalty of five years to life in prison. Arizona prosecutors were next in line to try Jeffs. He was held in the Washington County jail, pending an April 23, 2007 trial on two counts of rape, as an accomplice for his role in arranging the marriage between Elissa Wall and her first cousin. Jeffs was believed to be leading his group from jail and a Utah state board has expressed dissatisfaction in dealing with Hildale police, believing that many members of the force had ties to Jeffs, and thus did not cooperate. In May and July 2007, Jeffs was indicted in Arizona on eight counts, including sexual misconduct with a minor and incest.

Jeffs's trial began on September 11, 2007, in St. George, Utah, with Judge James L. Shumate presiding. Jeffs was housed in Utah's Purgatory Correctional Facility in solitary confinement for the duration. At the culmination of the trial, on September 25, Jeffs was found guilty of two counts of being an accomplice to rape. He was sentenced to prison for 10 years to life and began serving his sentence at the Utah State Prison. On July 27, 2010, the Utah Supreme Court, citing deficient jury instructions, reversed Jeffs's convictions and ordered a new trial. The court found that the trial judge should have told the jury that Jeffs could not be convicted unless it could be proved that he intended for Elissa's husband to engage in nonconsensual sex with her. Elissa subsequently wrote an autobiography on her experiences in the FLDS Church and with Jeffs entitled Stolen Innocence. The book was co-authored with former New York Times journalist Lisa Pulitzer.

Jeffs was also scheduled to be tried in Arizona. He had entered a not-guilty plea on February 27, 2008, to sex charges stemming from the arranged marriages of three teenaged girls to older men. He was transported to the Mohave County jail to await trial. On June 9, 2010, a state judge, at the request of Mohave County prosecutor Matt Smith, dismissed all charges with prejudice. Smith said that the Arizona victims no longer wanted to testify and that Jeffs had spent almost two years in jail awaiting trial, more than he would have received had he been convicted. Combined with the pending charges against Jeffs in Texas, Smith concluded that "it would be impractical and unnecessary" to try Jeffs in Arizona. Jeffs was returned to Utah; at the time, his appeal of the 2007 conviction was still pending. On August 9, 2011, he was convicted in Texas on two counts of sexual assault of a child and sentenced to life in prison. He will be eligible for parole on July 22, 2038.

=== Incarceration ===
Jeffs tried to hang himself in jail in 2007 in Utah. On July 9, 2008, he was taken from the Mohave County, Arizona jail in Kingman, Arizona, to a Las Vegas hospital for what was described as a serious medical problem. Sheriff Tom Sheahan did not specify the problem, but said it was serious enough to move him about 100 miles from the Kingman Regional Medical Center to the Nevada hospital. Jeffs has engaged in lengthy hunger strikes, which his doctors and attorneys have claimed were for spiritual reasons. In August 2009, Superior Court Judge Steve Conn ordered that Jeffs be force-fed at the Arizona jail.

On August 29, 2011, Jeffs was taken to East Texas Medical Center, Tyler, Texas, and hospitalized in critical condition under a medically induced coma after excessive fasting. Officials were not sure how long he would remain hospitalized, but expected him to live. Jeffs is incarcerated at the Louis C. Powledge Unit of the TDCJ near Palestine, Texas. He predicted in December 2012 that the world would end before 2013 and called for his followers to prepare for the end. In 2012, while incarcerated at the Powledge Unit, Jeffs released a book titled Jesus Christ Message to All Nations compiling various revelations that he said he had received. Among these were directives to set Jeffs free and warnings to specific countries around the world. Copies of the book were mailed to Utah state legislators by the FLDS Church. Federal prosecutors stated in 2016 that the publication had been financed by $250,000 in money defrauded from federal welfare programs and laundered through FLDS shops.

The United Effort Plan (UEP) trust that formerly belonged to the FLDS was taken over by Utah in 2005 and controlled by the court for over a decade, before a judge handed it over to a community board mostly composed of former sect members. In 2017, both the trust and Jeffs were sued by a woman alleging she was sexually abused by Jeffs when she was a child. He allegedly suffered a mental breakdown in the summer of 2019, leaving him unfit to give a deposition in the sex abuse case against him. Attorneys representing the UEP community trust contended that forcing him to testify would be "futile." The plaintiff's attorney said there is a lack of evidence to support a claim of Jeff's incompetency, accusing the trust of being "understandably very fearful" about Jeffs's testimony since it is liable for his actions as the past president of the FLDS. FLDS members continue to consider Jeffs to be their leader and prophet who speaks to God and who has been wrongly convicted.

== Views ==
Jeffs condemned same-sex marriage as being as evil as murder. Jeffs has also condemned interracial marriage and described black people as being used by the devil for evil, as detailed in 2005 by the Southern Poverty Law Center's Intelligence Report. While in prison, he has made several end times predictions.

== See also ==
- Mormon abuse cases – Sexual and other abuse cases in the LDS Church
- Placement marriage – Arranged marriage in Mormon fundamentalist groups
- List of polygamy court cases

Fundamentalist Church of Jesus Christ of Latter-Day Saints titles
Preceded by Rulon T. Jeffs	Prophet; 2002–present	Succeeded by incumbent With disputed interruptions by: Lyle Jeffs (designated acting president); William E. Jessop (momentary successor); Merril Jessop (once de facto head); Wendell L. Nielsen (one time President)
Corporation of the Fundamentalist Church of Jesus Christ of Latter Day Saints titles
Preceded by Rulon T. Jeffs	President; 2002 – December 4, 2007	Succeeded by Wendell L. Nielsen
Preceded by Wendell L. Nielsen	President; January 28, 2011 – present	Succeeded by incumbent
