= Mormon abuse cases =

Sexual and other abuse cases in the LDS Church

Mormon abuse cases are cases of confirmed and alleged abuse, including child sexual abuse, by churches in the Latter Day Saint movement and its agents.

== Selected LDS Church cases ==
=== 2000s ===
- In 2001, The Church of Jesus Christ of Latter-day Saints (LDS Church) paid a three million dollar settlement to Jeremiah Scott, after Scott filed a lawsuit in 1998 against the church for what his attorney described as an attempted cover-up of sexual abuse Scott suffered from church member Franklin Curtis. The LDS Church denied legal liability in the case, and said it was settling the lawsuit based on "litigation economics" alone.
- In September 2008, LDS Church bishop Timothy McCleve pleaded guilty to sexually molesting children from his ward. He was sentenced in December 2008 to 1–15 year prison terms for the abuse. While serving his sentence, another victim came forward, and in 2011, McCleve pleaded guilty and was sentenced to two additional 1-15 year terms.

=== 2010s ===
- In March 2010, former LDS Church bishop Lon Kennard Sr. was charged with 43 felony counts of sex abuse and sexual exploitation of children, and was imprisoned in Wasatch County, Utah. In November 2011, Kennard was sentenced to three terms of five-years-to-life in prison to be served consecutively, after pleading guilty to three first-degree felony counts of aggravated sex abuse of a child for sexually abusing his daughters.
- In December 2013, LDS Church bishop Todd Michael Edwards was sentenced to three years in prison for molesting two teenage girls who attended his congregation in Menifee, California. Edwards received two concurrent sentences of three years in prison for two felony counts of sexual battery and sexual penetration with a foreign object. A felony charge of witness intimidation was dismissed as part of a plea bargain with prosecutors after Edwards pleaded not guilty.
- In January 2014, two men filed a lawsuit in the U.S. state of Hawaii against the LDS Church, alleging that they were sexually abused as children on a church-owned pineapple farm in Maui from 1986 through 1988.
- In January 2014, former LDS Church bishop Michael Wayne Coleman was arrested and charged with luring a minor for sexual exploitation after a forensic examination of his laptop and cellphone revealed sexually graphic conversations and an exchange of nude photographs with a teenaged student in Brazil.
- In September 2016, former LDS Church bishop John Goodrich was arrested and charged with sexually abusing his daughter when she was a child. Shortly before his arrest, Goodrich had spiritually confessed to the local bishop and had quickly been excommunicated. However, prosecutors dropped the charges the next year because the bishop would not testify due to Idaho's clergy-penitent privilege. Goodrich's daughter and wife signed a non-disclosure agreement (NDA) with the LDS Church. As part of the agreement they would receive a $300,000 settlement but agree to not sue the church and to destroy their recordings of the meetings with the church attorney; the agreement did not prevent them from telling their story to media. Recordings by another person, who had been present at the meetings but who was not part of the NDA, were shared with and reported on by the Associated Press in December 2023.
- In August 2017, former LDS Church bishop Erik Hughes pleaded guilty to sexually abusing two teenage boys from his congregation in Mapleton, Utah. The abuse occurred in June 2014 during his tenure as bishop. Hughes received concurrent 1–15 year prison sentences on the sexual abuse counts, and 0–5 years in prison for witness tampering.
- On August 15, 2017, MormonLeaks published a 316-page document which contained confirmed and alleged instances of child sexual abuse between 1959 and 2017.
- On October 30, 2017, an Australian court sentenced Darran Scott to 10 years in prison for sexually abusing boys, some of whom he met as a Mormon leader.
- Rob Porter resigned from his White House job in February 2018 after evidence of domestic abuse became public. According to Jana Riess of the Religion News Service, Porter's second wife said she was discouraged from filing for a restraining order by her bishop because of the effect it would have on his career.

=== 2020s ===
- In 2022, a bankruptcy judge approved a reorganization plan for the Boy Scouts of America to settle claims of child sexual abuse by troop leaders. The original plan was to include a US$ 250 million payment from the LDS Church, but the judge refused to approve that part of the settlement proposal, stating it went too far in attempting to protect the LDS Church from abuse claims that were only loosely connected to scouting activities.
- In 2023, a jury awarded a Riverside woman $2.28 billion against her stepfather for the sexual abuse she endured for years by her stepfather at church functions, allegedly with knowledge of local church leaders and her mother. The church denied wrongdoing, but settled its part of the lawsuit for $1 million in December; the woman's mother settled for $200,000.
- In 2024, a missionary was arrested on suspicion of rape and forcible sodomy in Saratoga Springs, Utah. The same year, a San Jose-based law firm would file 91 lawsuits against the LDS Church related to sex abuse allegations.
- In 2026, former Livermore, California LDS bishop Michael Morris was arrested and criminally charged with 18 counts of felony child sex abuse.

=== Joseph Bishop case ===
In March 2018, MormonLeaks, a watchdog website, released a December 2, 2017 recording, taken in a Chandler, Arizona hotel conference room, of an interview of Joseph Bishop, a former LDS Church mission president, then 85, by McKenna Denson, a 55-year-old woman from Pueblo, Colorado. In the recording, Denson, who first poses as a Latter-day Saint sectarian faith reporter, accuses Bishop of having abused her in January 1984, while he was her mission president at the Missionary Training Center in Provo, Utah, taking her to his private study with a day bed, tearing open her blouse pulling up her skirt, and successfully penetrated her against her will, her being spared continuation of the rape due to his erectile dysfunction.

In December 2020, the case was dismissed at the request of both the church and Denson.

==== Timeline of reportages ====
Denson may have reported the abuse to her subsequent Washington, D.C., mission-field leader in 1984 or 1985. In 1987, she reported it to her local congregation's bishop, Ron Leavitt, a microbiology professor at Brigham Young University (BYU). (Leavitt told the Salt Lake Tribune in 2018, "I felt the allegations were groundless" because, among other factors, his assumption potential MTC presidents receive extensive vettings.) Per some reports, what Leavitt was told was that Denson and another missionary were taken by the MTC president to the basement of the MTC and shown pornography. Denson says that in 1988 she told at least one LDS Church general authority, Carlos Asay. Asay has since died and the LDS Church states it has no record of Denson's meeting with Asay.

In 2010, Denson told her local Pleasant Grove, Utah, ecclesiastical leaders, who referred the matter to local police. Pleasant Grove police made a routine call to the Denson's home verifying she did not need emergency assistance and did not open an investigation of her accusations because they had occurred outside of Pleasant Grove's jurisdiction.

==== Recording ====
Within the recording, Joseph Bishop says he does not remember his interactions with Denson transpiring in the manner she describes. Bishop says that while president over the MTC he engaged in inappropriate behaviors of which he regrets, involving more than one young woman serving at the MTC, including having given a back rub that became "too frisky" to a young-woman once-missionary trainee who served as his and his wife's assistant at his family's home. (This then-assistant to Bishop's family later reported the 1985 abuse by him to her bishop in 2010.)

Bishop said that some young women missionary trainees at the MTC would have flashbacks to previous experiences of sexual trauma and would counsel with MTC leaders (in worthiness interviews) for spiritual guidance; he said he was "the last person who should have been" providing pastoral counseling to these young women.

==== Joseph Bishop's responses ====
Joseph Bishop's son and attorney, Greg Bishop of Park City, Utah, told reporters that at the time of the interview, his father and client was on medications and recovering from surgery, and lacked mental acuity, and that many of his statements in the recording reflect this confusion.

Furthermore, Greg Bishop said that sometime after Denson returned to Provo, Utah, from Washington D.C., she showed her breasts to Joseph Bishop without solicitation. Denson has denied this, stating that the last time she met with Bishop was at the time of the assault: "I did not speak to that man again until Dec. 2, 2017." BYU police stated that, during their 2017 investigation, Bishop told them that at the MTC, he asked Denson to show him her breasts. (Bishop's son and attorney says his father and client does not remember making that statement to police.) The Utah County attorney's office said that it likely would have prosecuted Bishop if Utah's statute of limitations for rape (which up until the 1990s had been four years) had not expired. The case was closed December 23, 2017.

Greg Bishop distributed to the news media excerpts from a dossier compiled by attorney David Jordan of Stoel Rives, who had been hired by the LDS Church, which contained Denson's LDS Church membership record, and which detailed the history of investigations of Denson's accusations within various jurisdictions, as well as for alleged crimes such as criminal fraud. Denson had reported over a half-dozen times that she was assaulted by numerous men on numerous separate occasions. Jordan's dossier says that Denson later retracted her initial accusations on certain occasions as having been false. None of these accusations have been prosecuted.

==== Litigation ====
The accuser's legal counsel, Craig Vernon, made the LDS Church aware of the recording in January 2018. Settlement negotiations between Denson and church were in progress when the recording was publicly released in March 2018 by MormonLeaks, which she had not initially authorized. but came to do so, after the fact. After the recording became public, the negotiations stalled. On April 4, 2018, Denson filed civil suit in the U.S. District Court for Utah against the church and Joseph Bishop for redress with respect to her mental, physical, and economic hardships caused by the alleged sexual assault and battery, negligent and intentional infliction of emotional distress, fraud, fraudulent nondisclosure and fraudulent concealment.

On May 15, 2018, attorneys representing both Joseph Bishop and the LDS Church filed motions to dismiss Denson's suit, arguing that the statute of limitations for Denson to file these claims had expired long before. On August 13, 2018, U.S. District Judge Dale A. Kimball dismissed most of the lawsuit, except for its fraud allegations against the LDS Church.

In May 2019, Denson's lawyers asked to be removed from the case with the judge approving the request on the same day.

==== LDS Church's responses ====
The church hired an outside law firm to interview Bishop, his accusers, and others. The church had been made aware of a second accuser in 2010. No action was taken at the time because of Bishop's adamant denial of the accusations. Ron Leavitt stated that in the 1980s, while he was serving as Denson's bishop, she told him that Joseph Bishop had taken her and her missionary companion to the basement of the MTC, and showed them pornography. Leavitt stated that he did not share this information with anyone at the time. "I didn't think it had much credence. I wasn't going to risk sullying the reputation of someone based on that kind of a report," Leavitt told the news media in 2018.

In March 2018, the LDS Church publicized its abuse resource hotline for use by local church leaders, and released a resource document that says, in part, "Church leaders should never disregard a report of abuse or counsel a member not to report criminal activity to law enforcement personnel."

=== Michael Jensen case and subsequent litigation ===
In mid-2013, LDS member Michael Jensen, son of a respected local Mormon family, while still on his mission in Arizona, was brought back to West Virginia for questioning. Members of Jensen's congregation were told by his mother to ask Michael to babysit. He abused the young children in the families who are included in the lawsuits and many other children too. Jensen was convicted of sexually abusing two children and is currently serving a prison sentence of 35 years to 75 years in a West Virginia state prison. Due to difficulty for the children to testify, Michael was only convicted for abusing two of the many children he abused. At the time of his sentencing, a state judge classified him as a "violent sexual predator".

The church settled its involvement in the case, but its insurance companies - National Union Insurance and ACE Property & Casualty Co. did not reimburse the church for its settlement payment. In 2021, the church sued its insurance companies to be reimbursed for the settlement payment, alleging the companies were in breach of contract. The court hearing the case ruled against the church in April 2025. The church has appealed the ruling.

== Response to abuse from the LDS Church ==
The LDS Church states that abusive behavior, whether physical, sexual, verbal, or emotional, is a sin and is condemned unreservedly by the church. The church teaches that victims of abuse should report it to their bishop or other trusted leadership, and should be assured that they are not to blame for the abuse. Bishops and other trusted leaders are told by the church to contact the church's Help Line before any further reporting takes place. Abuse of any form should be reported not only by the bishop but also by the victim to local law enforcement.

Newsletter author Meg Conley said she had heard from many women who reported abuse to their LDS bishop, and that bishops tended to have keeping the family together as a higher priority than physical safety. In some cases, she said they recommended marriage counseling so the family members being abused could avoid provoking their abuser.

Donna Kelly, an attorney at the Utah Crime Victims Legal Clinic, said that in approximately 3,000 cases over three decades, bishops would sometimes show up to defend the abuser, but never the abused. She said church lawyers were more concerned about saving souls than protecting victims, and did not offer sufficient training to volunteer bishops to deal with abuse cases. Women were described by abusers and church leaders as "mouthy", and some were reportedly asked to leave their ward because they were being "too disruptive" by filing abuse allegations.

All church members who work with children or youth in their callings are expected to complete an online training module titled “Protecting Children and Youth.” The basic training takes about half an hour to complete.

In July 2023, a number of policies were put in place by the LDS Church in the United Kingdom to safeguard children and prevent abuse. Most notably, all British church members working with children, as well as members of bishoprics and stake presidencies, must now undergo a background check before beginning their callings. The changes came after several church members heavily lobbied both church and secular leaders for additional protections.

Beginning in May 2025, the LDS Church has directed its leaders to comply with a Utah law, which requires the church to check two public databases of registered sex offenders, prior to placing adults in a supervisory role over children. A church spokesperson stated that the church was a "strong supporter" of the law. The law did not single out any one church or group. According to the Salt Lake Tribune, many churches have already been following the process which is now required by law, and some already require stricter controls.

== Fundamentalist abuse cases ==
In 2011, fundamentalist church leader Warren Jeffs was convicted of sexual assault of a child and sentenced to life in prison after facing several prior criminal cases for similar conduct. A 2017 lawsuit alleged that Jeffs, along with two of his brothers and over 20 other defendants, mostly unnamed, sexually assaulted underage female members of their religious denomination in the presence of other members and kept records about the abuse.

In September 2022, Colorado City, Arizona-based FLDS leader Samuel Bateman was arrested on charges of destroying evidence related to a federal investigation which alleged he sexually abused 10 underage girls who he took as his wives in "atonement" ceremonies. Three reported accomplices of Bateman were also arrested and charged with one count of obstructing a federal prosecution and on a second count of abducting eight girls. Bateman was later found to have 20 wives, which included underage girls, and, according to his family, also sought to marry his teenage daughter. In 2024, Bateman pleaded guilty to Conspiracy to Commit Transportation of a Minor for Criminal Sexual Activity and Conspiracy to Commit Kidnapping and was sentenced to 50 years in prison and followed by a lifetime of supervised release.
