= Lost boys (Mormon fundamentalism) =

Term for young males excommunicated or pressured to leave a polygamous Mormon community

"Lost boys" is a term used for young men who have been excommunicated or pressured to leave polygamous Mormon fundamentalist groups, such as the Fundamentalist Church of Jesus Christ of Latter Day Saints (FLDS). Although sometimes officially accused of apostasy or disobedience, it is thought that they are mainly pressured to leave by older adult men to reduce competition for wives within such sects, usually when they are between the ages of 13 and 21.

== Background ==
Since boys and girls are born in approximately equal numbers, and women do not enter the community in large numbers, the pool of available women is not sufficient for all men to have multiple wives.

While some boys leave by their own choice, many have been banished for conduct such as watching a movie, watching television, playing football, or talking to a girl. Some boys are told not to return unless they can return with a wife. One 2004 source estimated that more than 400 teenage boys have been ostracized from the FLDS Church for violating community rules. Another article from 2005 estimated that between 400 and 1,000 boys and young men had been pressured to leave for such reasons. Many young women also have left or been pressured to leave because they did not want to be part of polygamous marriages.

Boys in these groups are commonly raised to not trust the outside world and that leaving their communities is a "sin worse than murder." With little education or skills applicable to life outside of their community of birth, they must learn to live in a society they inherently distrust yet know little about and as a result, some lost boys become homeless or end up in the criminal justice system. The families of banished boys are told that the boys are now dead to them.

== Specific instances ==
The Fundamentalist Church of Jesus Christ of Latter-Day Saints (hereafter FLDS) is a particularly controversial fundamentalist sect which has repeatedly been connected with the concept of lost boys. As early as 1968, the church's home turf of Colorado City, Arizona, had a peace officer whose responsibility was "to make sure that the boys would not associate with the girls." This officer's main police duties evolved over the next two decades to include "running the surplus boys out of town" to allow the "worthy" men of the community to live plural marriage by adding new, younger wives. More recently, in the mid-1990s, a Colorado City police officer named Rodney Holm was one of a dozen men who attacked and assaulted a 17-year-old named Robert Williams because Williams had shown an interest in a girl his age. The attack was organized by the girl's father, who was Officer Holm's brother. Afterwards, in February 1996, they pleaded no contest to simple assault.

Some individuals, such as Dan Fischer, a dentist who left the FLDS Church, work to help young men who have left or who have been ejected from polygamist organizations in cities such as Colorado City or adjacent Hildale, Utah. The FLDS church was sued by six "lost boys" in August 2004 for "alleged economic and psychological injury."

Brent Jeffs details his early life as the grandson of an FLDS prophet and his eventual excommunication as "very different." At an early age, Jeffs' father decided to leave the church and take his family with him. Upon hearing this news, Jeffs decided to return to the church to make the decision on his own. During this time, he experienced a social black-balling for his family's history with FLDS, as well as becoming romantically intertwined with a girl his age, and removed himself once again from the church.

== In popular culture ==
In the HBO television series Big Love (2006–2011), the main protagonist is a former lost boy, having grown up challenging the elder who drove him out of their community as a teenager. The series portrays machinations of some senior men within a fundamentalist congregation to "reserve" young unmarried women for themselves.

The documentary film Sons of Perdition (2010) depicts the struggles of three real-life lost boys.

The off-Broadway play Exit 27 (2013) dramatized the story of four lost boys struggling to survive in the desert outside Colorado City. Playwright Aleks Merilo based the script on interviews conducted with lost boys living in Hurricane, Utah.

== See also ==
- Operational sex ratio
- Population dynamics
- YFZ Ranch
- Ex-Mormon
