= Fundamentalist Church of Jesus Christ of Latter-Day Saints =

Latter-Day Saints denomination

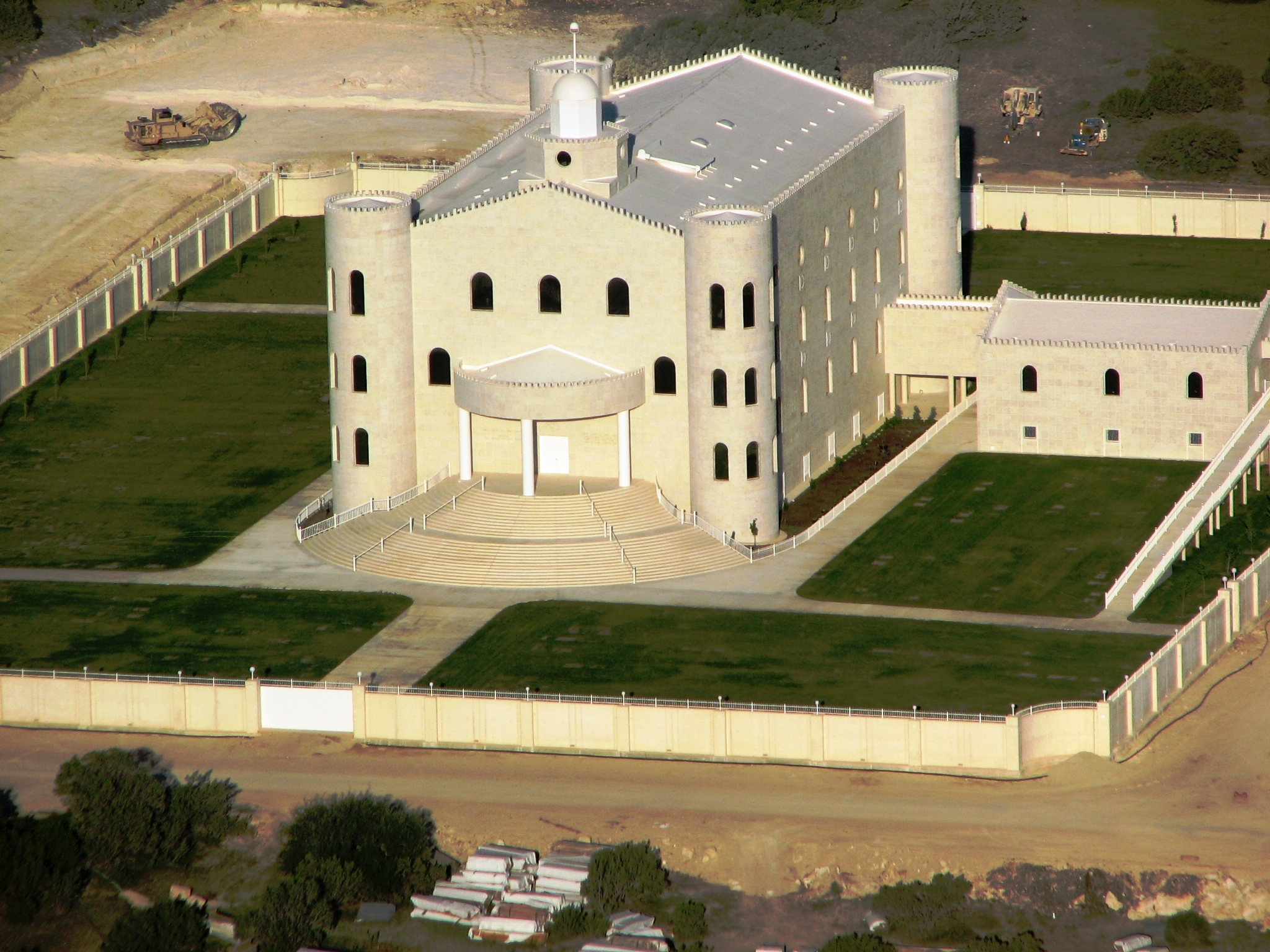
- Former FLDS temple in the YFZ Ranch in Texas
- Classification: Latter Day Saint movement
- Orientation: Mormon fundamentalist
- Scripture: Standard Works (with adjustments)
- Theology: Continuing revelation
- Structure: One Man Rule
- Associations: United Effort Plan
- Region: North America
- Origin: Early 1900s (as Short Creek Community)
- Branched from: The Priesthood Council
- Separations: Centennial Park; Church of Jesus Christ Inc.
- Other names: The Fundamentalists, First Ward, FLDS Church

The Fundamentalist Church of Jesus Christ of Latter-Day Saints (abbreviated to FLDS Church or FLDS) is a Mormon fundamentalist group whose members practice polygamy. It is variously defined as a cult, a sect or a new religious movement. Warren Jeffs has been the church's president since 2002.

The FLDS has a large concentration of members in the twin towns of Colorado City, Arizona, and Hildale, Utah, where the church was formerly headquartered, in addition to various other populations across the Western United States, Mexico and Canada. The FLDS also previously owned a 1,700-acre complex near Eldorado, Texas, known as the YFZ Ranch, which was the site of a high-profile law enforcement raid in 2008 that brought the church to mainstream public attention.

Since the mid-2000s, the FLDS has come under increasing scrutiny for allegations of child sexual abuse, child marriage, human trafficking, child labor abuses, welfare fraud and the ostracizing of members, with several prominent members and leaders having been investigated for or convicted of sexual offenses. Warren Jeffs himself was convicted on separate rape charges in Utah and Texas, respectively, and is currently serving a sentence of life plus twenty years in the latter state.

== History ==
=== Origins ===
The Fundamentalist Church of Jesus Christ of Latter-Day Saints (FLDS Church) traces its claim to spiritual authority to when Brigham Young, then-president of the Church of Jesus Christ of Latter-day Saints (LDS Church), once visited the Short Creek Community and said, "This will someday be the head and not the tail of the church. This will be the granaries of the Saints. This land will produce in abundance sufficient wheat to feed the people."

In 1904, the LDS Church issued the Second Manifesto renouncing polygamy, and eventually excommunicated Mormons who continued to solemnize or enter into new plural marriages. Short Creek, located in what was then the Arizona Territory, soon became a gathering place for these Mormons. Members of the community believed a statement published in 1912 by Lorin C. Woolley, of a purported 1886 divine revelation to then-LDS Church President John Taylor, took precedence over the 1890 Manifesto, which had prohibited new plural marriages by LDS members. The community believed that in issuing the 1890 Manifesto, Wilford Woodruff sold his right to the Priesthood, thereby making Lorin's father, John W. Woolley, his successor by the One Man doctrine.

Despite these claims of legitimacy, the FLDS and its members were excommunicated by the larger LDS church and its leaders. After being excommunicated, some of the locally prominent men in Short Creek, including Lorin Woolley and John Y. Barlow, created the organization known as the Council of Friends. The council, consisting of seven high priests that were said to be the governing priesthood body on Earth, was the governing ecclesiastical body over the Short Creek Community until being incorporated as the FLDS Church under Rulon Jeffs. In 1935, the LDS Church excommunicated the Mormon residents of Short Creek who refused to sign an oath renouncing polygamy. Following this, Barlow led those in Short Creek who were dedicated to preserving the practice of plural marriage. Consequently, Mormon fundamentalists that didn't follow Barlow separated, leading to the creation of multiple fundamentalist organizations outside Short Creek by 1954. These included the Apostolic United Brethren (AUB) and Kingston group through Joseph White Musser.

=== Postwar development and Short Creek raid ===
In the morning of July 26, 1953, 102 Arizona state police officers and National Guard soldiers raided the fundamentalist Mormon community of Short Creek, Arizona. They arrested the entire populace, including 236 children. Of those 236 children, 150 were not allowed to return to their parents for more than two years. Other parents never regained custody of their children.

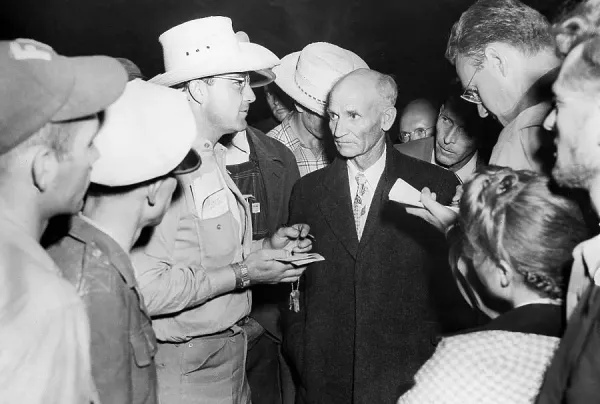
Future FLDS leader Leroy S. Johnson talking to journalists following the raid

The Short Creek raid was the largest mass arrest of polygamists in American history, and it received a great deal of press coverage. After the raid, polygamists continued to live there, and later the town was renamed Colorado City.

=== From Leroy S. Johnson to Warren Jeffs ===
John Y. Barlow claimed to be both head of temporal affairs and the Priesthood through his United Effort Plan. By 1984, a schism emerged in Short Creek when some took issue with his One Man authority. Those followers moved south of Colorado City to Centennial Park, Arizona and called themselves "The Work of Jesus Christ", or "Second Ward."

Leroy S. Johnson succeeded Barlow, and stress on the One Man Rule doctrine strengthened. Rulon Jeffs succeeded Leroy, incorporating Short Creek as the FLDS in 1984 to reorganize to an Episcopal polity reflecting the One Man authority.

With no clear succession, Warren Jeffs assumed leadership when Rulon Jeffs died. Winston Blackmore, who had been serving in Canada as the Bishop of Bountiful for the FLDS Church, was excommunicated by Jeffs in an apparent power struggle. This led to a split within the community in Bountiful, British Columbia, with an estimated 700 FLDS members leaving the church to follow Blackmore.

=== Legal troubles, 2003–2006 ===
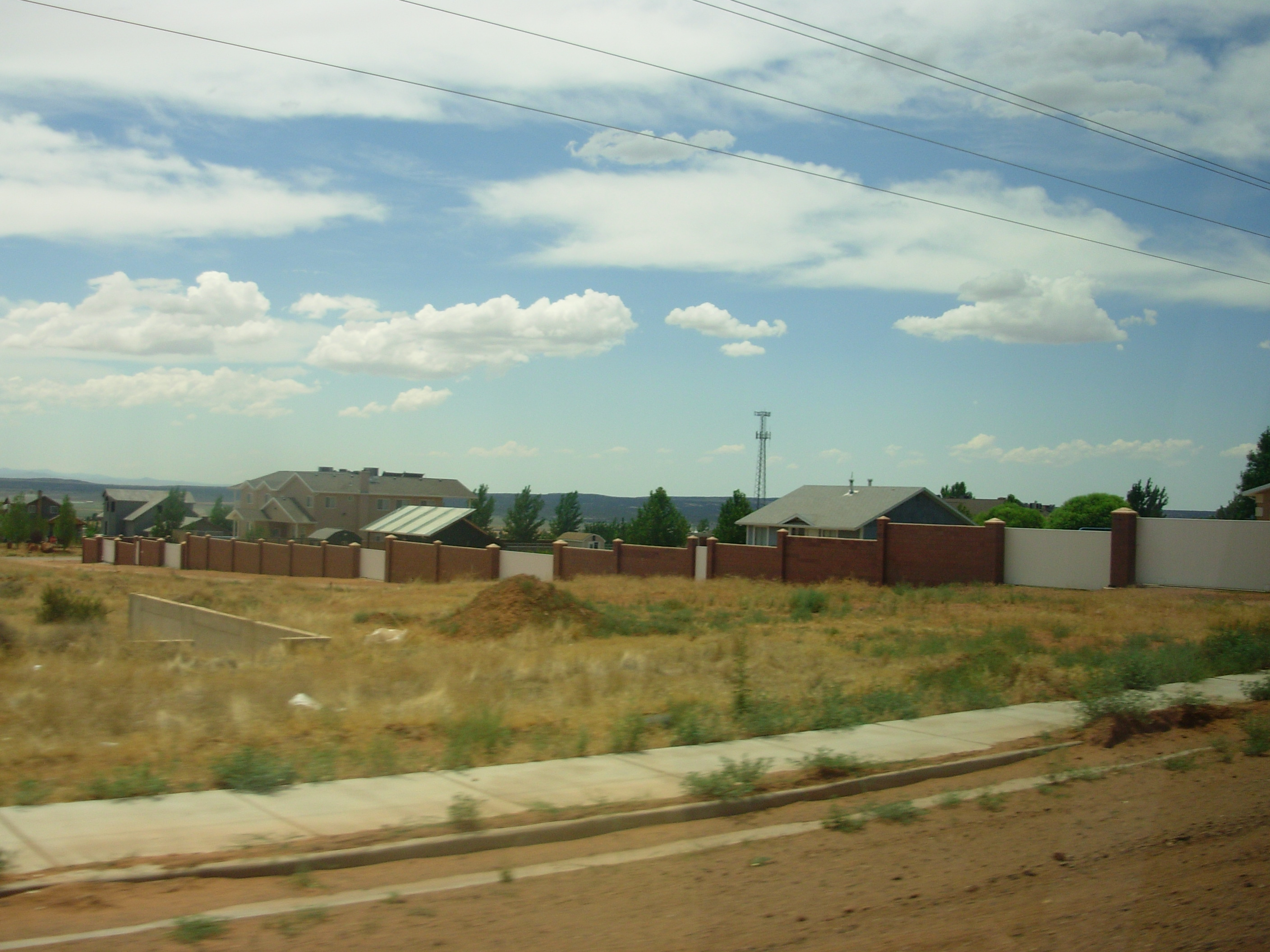
The former home of FLDS leader Warren Jeffs in Colorado City

Polygamy is illegal in all 50 states of the United States as well as Canada and Mexico. Attempts to overturn the illegality based on right of religious freedom have been unsuccessful. In 2003, the church received increased attention from the state of Utah when police officer Rodney Holm, a member of the church, was convicted of unlawful sexual conduct with a 16- or 17-year-old and one count of bigamy for his marriage to and impregnation of plural wife Ruth Stubbs. The conviction was the first legal action against a member of the FLDS Church since the Short Creek raid.

In November 2003, church member David Allred purchased for YFZ Land LLC the 1,371-acre (555-hectare) Isaacs Ranch four miles (six kilometers) northeast of Eldorado, Texas, on Schleicher County Road 300 "as a hunting retreat". The property would be known within the sect as Yearning For Zion Ranch, or YFZ Ranch. Allred sent 30 to 40 construction workers from Colorado City–Hildale to work on the property, which soon included three 3-story houses, each 8,000 to 10,000 square feet (930 m^{2}), a concrete plant, and a plowed field. After seeing FLDS Church critic Flora Jessop on the ABC television program Primetime Live on March 4, 2004, concerned Eldorado residents contacted Jessop. Jessop investigated, and on March 25, 2004, held a press conference in Eldorado confirming that the new neighbors were FLDS Church adherents. On May 18, 2004, Schleicher County Sheriff David Doran and his Chief Deputy visited Colorado City, and the FLDS Church officially acknowledged that the Schleicher County property would be a new base for the church. It was reported in the news media that the church had built a temple at the YFZ Ranch; this is supported by evidence including aerial photographs of a large stone structure (approximately 88 feet (27 m) wide) in a state of relative completion. A local newspaper, the Eldorado Success, reported that the temple foundation was dedicated by Warren Jeffs on January 1, 2005.

On January 10, 2004, Dan Barlow (the mayor of Colorado City) and about 20 other men were excommunicated from the church and stripped of their wives and children (who would be reassigned to other men), and expelled from town. The same day two teenage girls reportedly fled the town with the aid of Flora Jessop, who advocates for plural wives' escape from polygamy. The two girls, Fawn Broadbent and Fawn Holm, soon found themselves in a highly publicized dispute over their freedom and custody. Jessop sought help for the two Fawns from the Arizona Department of Child Protective Services, who assigned the girls to a foster home, but the girls fled when a judge barred them from contact with Jessop and their new address was given to their parents. Fawn Broadbent was allowed to move in with Carl Hohm, while Fawn Holm remained in hiding. Fawn Holm eventually moved in with a polygamist follower of Winston Blackmore.

In October 2004, Flora Jessop reported that David Allred purchased a 60-acre (240,000 m^{2}) parcel of land near Mancos, Colorado, (midway between Cortez and Durango) about the same time he bought the Schleicher County property. Allred told authorities the parcel was to be used as a hunting retreat.

In July 2005, eight men of the church were indicted for sexual contact with minors. All of them turned themselves in to police in Kingman, Arizona, within days.

On July 29, 2005, Brent W. Jeffs filed suit accusing three of his uncles, including Warren Jeffs, of sexually assaulting him when he was a child. The suit also named the FLDS Church as a defendant. On August 10, former FLDS Church member Shem Fischer, Dan Fischer's brother, added the church and Warren Jeffs as defendants to a 2002 lawsuit claiming he was illegally fired because he no longer adhered to the faith. Fischer, who was a salesman for a wooden cabinetry business in Hildale, claimed church officials interfered with his relationship with his employer and blacklisted him. The district court granted summary judgment in favor of the company and found that Fischer was not fired from his job, but quit instead. The district court ruling was overturned in part on the basis that Fischer was discriminated against on the basis of religion when he reapplied for his position and was denied employment because he had left the FLDS church. The parties eventually settled the case for an agreed payment of damages to Shem Fischer.

In July 2005, six teenaged and young adult "Lost Boys" who claimed they were cast out of their homes on the Utah–Arizona border to reduce competition for wives, filed suit against the FLDS Church. "The [boys] have been excommunicated pursuant to that policy and practice and have been cut off from family, friends, benefits, business and employment relationships, and purportedly condemned to eternal damnation", their suit read. "They have become 'lost boys' in the world outside the FLDS community."

On May 7, 2006, the FBI named Warren Jeffs to its Ten Most Wanted Fugitives list on charges of unlawful flight to avoid prosecution. He was captured on Interstate 15 on August 28, 2006, just north of Las Vegas, after a routine traffic stop.

The mayor of Colorado City, Terrill C. Johnson, was arrested on May 26, 2006, for eight fraudulent vehicle registration charges for registering his vehicles in a state in which he was not resident, which is a felony. He was booked into Purgatory Correctional Facility in Hurricane, Utah, and was released after paying the $5,000 bail in cash.

=== Leadership struggles, 2007–11 ===
On September 25, 2007, after trial by a jury in St. George, Utah, Jeffs was found guilty of two counts of being an accomplice to rape and was sentenced to ten years to life in prison. This conviction was later overturned, but he was subsequently sentenced to life in prison plus 20 years and fined $10,000 after being convicted on charges of aggravated sexual assault and sexual assault.

From 2007 to 2011, the leadership of the FLDS Church was unclear. On November 20, 2007, following Warren Jeffs's conviction, attorneys for Jeffs released the following statement: "Mr. Jeffs resigned as President of The Fundamentalist Church of Jesus Christ of Latter-Day Saints, Inc." The statement did not address his position as prophet of the church, but merely addressed his resignation from his fiduciary post as president of the corporation belonging to the FLDS Church.

According to a Salt Lake Tribune telephone transcript, there is evidence that, when incarcerated, Warren Jeffs named William E. Jessop, a former first counselor, as his successor or, alternatively, that Jeffs had told Jessop on January 24, 2007, that he (Jeffs) had never been the rightful leader of the FLDS. Many press accounts suggested that Merril Jessop, who had been leading the Eldorado compound, was the de facto leader of the church. Additionally, on January 9, 2010, documents filed with the Utah Department of Commerce named Wendell L. Nielsen as the president of the sect. The FLDS incorporation charter does not require the church president to be the church's prophet, but previous president Rulon Jeffs had also been prophet. In 2010, Willie Jessop, the church's spokesman, refused to name the incumbent prophet "out of fear there'd be retaliation by the government".

On January 28, 2011, Jeffs reasserted his leadership of the denomination, and Nielsen was removed as the church's legal president. According to affidavits submitted by FLDS church leaders, Jeffs was acclaimed as leader at mass meetings of 4,000 church members in February and April 2011, and on April 10, 2011, a group of 2,000 male FLDS members voted unanimously to "uphold and sustain" Jeffs's authority. By that time Willie Jessop had publicly broken with Jeffs, putting himself forward as a challenger for the leadership, but he was subsequently declared an apostate and left the church. A 2012 CNN documentary confirmed that Jeffs still led the church from prison.

=== April 2008 raid ===
In April 2008, acting on a call from an alleged teen victim of physical and sexual abuse at the FLDS compound in Schleicher County, Texas, Texas Child Protective Services and Department of Public Safety officers entered the compound to serve search and arrest warrants and carry out court orders designed to protect children. Over the course of several days, from April 3 through April 10, Texas CPS removed 439 children under age 18 from the church's YFZ Ranch, while law enforcement, including Texas Rangers, executed their search and arrest warrants on the premises. The April 2008 events at the YFZ Ranch generated intense press coverage in the U.S., especially in the Southwest, and also garnered international attention.

On April 18, 2008, following a two-day hearing, Judge Barbara Walther of the 51st Judicial District Court ordered all of the FLDS children to remain in the temporary custody of Child Protective Services. Judge Walther's ruling was subsequently reversed by the 3rd Court of Appeals in Austin, Texas in a ruling that Texas CPS was not justified in removing every child from the ranch. The 3rd Court of Appeals granted mandamus relief and ordered the trial court to vacate the portion of its order giving CPS temporary custody of the FLDS children. CPS petitioned the Texas Supreme Court requesting that the 3rd Court of Appeals' ruling be overturned, but the Texas Supreme Court, in a written opinion issued May 29, 2008, declined to overturn the ruling of the 3rd Court of Appeals.

The abuse hotline calls that prompted the raid are now believed to have been made by Rozita Swinton, a non-FLDS woman with no known connection to the FLDS community in Texas. Nevertheless, a court determined that the search warrants executed at the YFZ compound were legally issued and executed, and that the evidence seized could not be excluded on the grounds that the initial call may have been a hoax.

=== Child sex assault convictions ===
In November 2008, 12 FLDS men were charged with offenses related to alleged underage marriages conducted during the years since the sect built the YFZ Ranch. As of June 2010, six FLDS members had been convicted of felonies and received sentences ranging from seven to 75 years' imprisonment.

On November 5, 2009, a Schleicher County, Texas jury found Raymond Jessop, 38, guilty of sexual assault of a child. According to evidence admitted at trial, Jessop sexually assaulted a 16-year-old girl to whom he had been "spiritually married" when the girl was 15 years old. The same jury sentenced Jessop to 10 years in prison and assessed a fine of $8,000.

On December 18, 2009, a Schleicher County, Texas jury found Allan Keate guilty of sexual assault of a child. Keate fathered a child with a 15-year-old girl. According to documents admitted at trial, Keate had also given three of his own daughters away in "spiritual" or "celestial" marriage, two of them at 15 and one at 14, to older men. The youngest of the three went to Warren Jeffs. Keate was sentenced to 33 years in prison. His conviction and sentence were later upheld on appeal.

On January 22, 2010, Michael George Emack pleaded no contest to sexual assault charges and was sentenced to seven years in prison. He married a 16-year-old girl at YFZ Ranch on August 5, 2004. She gave birth to a son less than a year later.

On March 17, 2010, a Tom Green County, Texas jury found Merril Leroy Jessop guilty of sexual assault of a child after deliberating for one hour. The court found that Jessop, 35, sexually assaulted a 15-year-old girl while living at the FLDS Ranch in Schleicher County, Texas. The jury sentenced Jessop to 75 years in prison and assessed a $10,000 fine.

=== April 2010 raid ===
On April 6, 2010, Arizona officials executed search warrants at governmental offices of the towns of Colorado City, Arizona and Hildale, Utah. According to one report, the warrants involved the misuse of funds and caused the Hildale Public Safety Department to be shut down. According to another report, city personnel and volunteers were ordered out of the buildings while the search was being conducted, prompting protests from Colorado City Fire Chief Jake Barlow. Despite these protests, public safety did not appear to be affected, as the county law enforcement agencies involved routed calls for emergency service through the county offices. A search warrant was also executed at Jake Barlow's residence.

The search warrant affidavit states that the Mohave County District Attorney sought records relating to personal charges on an agency credit card from the Colorado City Fire Department under the open records laws. Chief Barlow indicated that there were no personal charges, therefore there were no records to disclose. Records obtained by subpoena from the banks involved showed a series of purchases made by Chief Barlow and Darger that are questionable, including diapers, child's clothing, and food, although the firefighters are not fed by the department.

=== After the raid ===
In November 2012, the Texas Attorney General's Office instituted legal proceedings to seize the FLDS ranch property in Eldorado, Texas. The basis for the forfeiture and seizure proceeding was cited as the use of FLDS property as "...a rural location where the systemic sexual assault of children would be tolerated without interference from law enforcement authorities", therefore, the property is contraband and subject to seizure. On April 17, 2014, Texas officials took physical possession of the property.

In 2012, Warren Jeffs published a volume titled Jesus Christ Message to All Nations containing various revelations, including one proclaiming his innocence and others serving as warnings to specific countries around the world.

In June 2014, the Arizona Office of the Attorney General filed a motion in U.S. District Court seeking to dissolve the local police forces and "the disbandment of the Colorado City, Arizona/Hildale, Utah Marshal's Office and the appointment of a federal monitor over municipal functions and services." As the basis for the legal proceeding, the Arizona Attorney General stated that "[t]he disbandment of the Colorado City/Hildale Marshal's Office is necessary and appropriate because this police department has operated for decades, and continues to operate, as the de facto law enforcement arm of the FLDS Church."

=== Reconsolidation efforts since 2022 ===
Documents presented to the media and state prosecutors in 2022–23 indicate that Warren Jeffs issued a series of revelations from prison in 2022 reasserting his authority over the church and calling its members together. In one document from June 2022, Jeffs instructed that fathers seeking "restoral" should reunite with their wives and children, while warning that God "cannot allow sin living to dwell" in the church any longer; another, distributed in August, required that children be gathered back to the church over the next five years in preparation for the imminent end of the world.

A group of mothers who had left the church stated in April 2023 that a number of children cared for by former members had gone missing since the August 2022 revelation, and were likely to have rejoined the church. In June 2023, Heber Jeffs, a nephew of Warren Jeffs, was sentenced to three years' probation on a charge of custodial interference after abetting the disappearance of the daughter of a former member of the church in 2022 in accordance with the revelations of that year.

By 2023, investigators stated that the members of the FLDS Church had spread out to avoid the attention of authorities, some moving north into North Dakota, and were communicating regularly with Warren Jeffs over Zoom. Warren Jeffs's son Helaman Jeffs had also emerged as a figure of authority within the church by this time. The revelations in 2022 were to be distributed by Helaman Jeffs, and he was also given the authority to perform polygamous marriages. Helaman is using a P.O. box in Ruso, North Dakota, close to a reported FLDS compound.

== Leaders ==
=== Previous heads ===
As senior member of the Priesthood Council in Short Creek:

- John Y. Barlow (1935–1949)

As president of the FLDS Church:

- Rulon T. Jeffs (1986–2002)

=== Current head ===
Warren Jeffs became head of the FLDS Church in 2002. In the years immediately following Jeffs's imprisonment in 2007, the leadership of the church was unclear. Other claimed leaders in this period include:

- William E. Jessop, 2007–2010, claimant to the succession.
- Merril Jessop, 2007 – February 2011 de facto leader
- Wendell L. Nielsen, 2010 – January 28, 2011, president of the church's corporate entity.
- Lyle Jeffs, brother of Warren Jeffs and former head and bishop of the church until his brother removed him from these posts in 2012, as reported by the Salt Lake Tribune. In 2011, a former member of the church stated that Lyle Jeffs had been Warren Jeffs's designated successor.

In 2011, Warren Jeffs retook legal control of the church and purged 45 of its members.

Samuel Bateman was a 2019–2023 claimant to the succession. Bateman broke from Jeffs and declared himself prophet in 2019. Arrested in 2022 and charged with sexual abuse, he was still recognized as prophet of the FLDS Church by some 50 followers as of 2023.

=== Bishops ===
As of 2018:

- James Oler – Canada

== Teachings ==
=== One Man Rule ===
In direct contrast to the structure of the Short Creek Community, the FLDS Church teaches that God only works through one man who has all Priesthood keys. In operation the President cannot be a member of the Priesthood Council. After the death of Rulon Jeffs, the succession of his role to his son Warren Jeffs was initially denied and the church had a vacancy in its leadership because of the rule, since it was believed by the members that Rulon was able to deliver his priesthood keys in the days to come after having his physically renewed body.

=== Marriage and placement marriage ===
The FLDS Church teaches the doctrine of plural marriage, which states that God commands in order for a man to receive the highest form of salvation to have a minimum of three wives. Connected with this doctrine is the patriarchal doctrine, the belief that wives are required to be subordinate to their husbands and placement marriage. The prophet elects to take wives from men as well as give wives to men according to their worthiness. This practice is also called the law of placing or placement marriage.

=== Property ownership ===
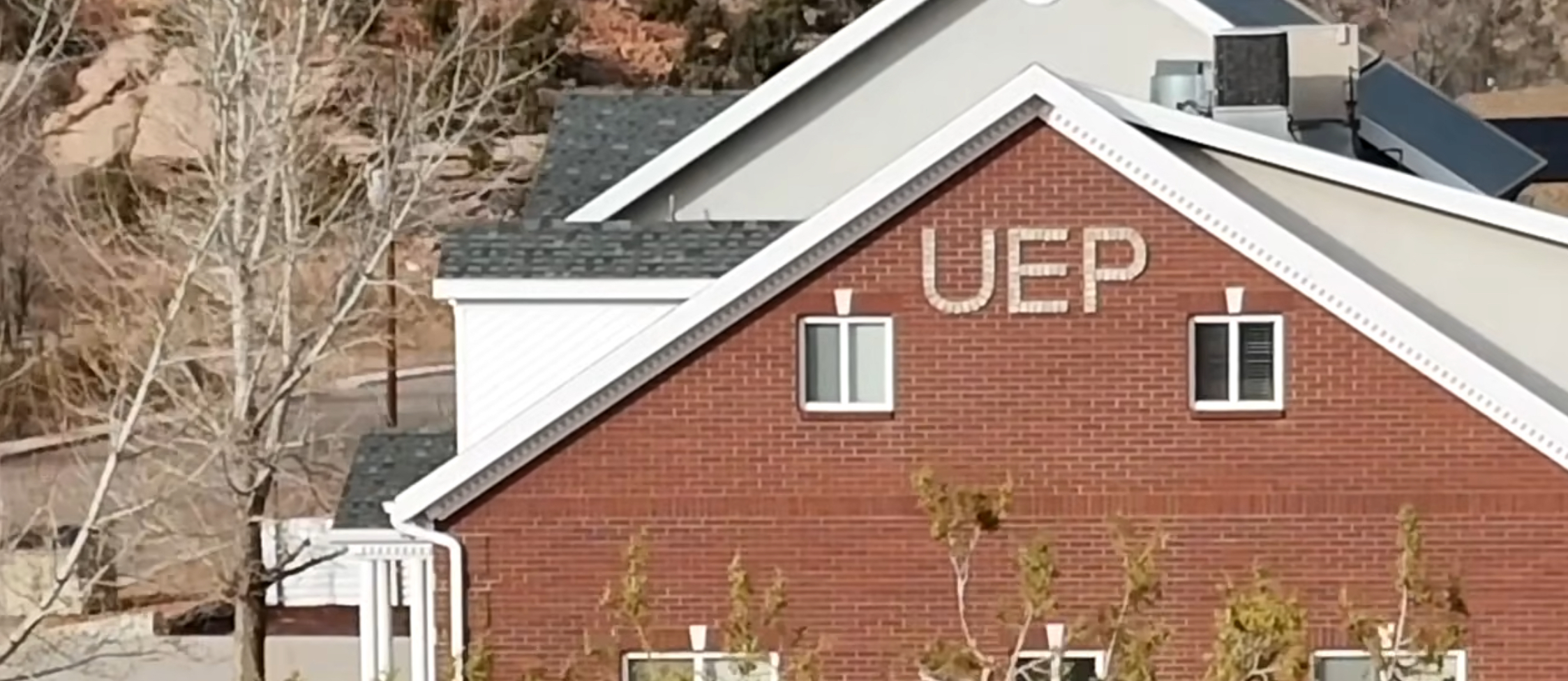
The United Effort Plan Headquarters

The land and houses formerly occupied by the FLDS Church on the Utah/Arizona border are owned by the United Effort Plan (UEP), established in 1942 as a subsidiary organization of the church. The UEP also owns most of the property of the businesses that were controlled by FLDS Church members in that area. The church viewed this "United Order" as a means of living the traditional Latter Day Saint doctrine of the "Law of Consecration". In 2005, the UEP was seized by the state of Utah following a lawsuit by the Attorney General. The UEP was worth $100 million at this time. State control of the UEP ended in 2019, with the trust reformed into a "religiously neutral" entity benefiting the original donors and their heirs, including those who had left the FLDS Church.

=== Race ===
According to the Southern Poverty Law Center the FLDS Church "is a polygamist, white supremacist, homophobic cult that Jeffs ruled with an iron fist". Jeffs has made several anti-Black public statements since 2002. These included saying that the devil brings evil to the earth through Black people, that Cain is the father of the Black race, that people with "Negro blood" are unworthy of the priesthood, that Black-White marriage is evil, and that marrying someone who has "connections with a Negro" would invoke a curse.

As an extension of the Adam-God teaching, FLDS leaders teach there are literal children of Satan in the same way there are literal children of God. Children of Satan were to be born with the Mark Of Cain as punishment for his slaying of Abel in creation, and therefore justifying the Priesthood ban. The seed of Cain survived the Flood through Ham's wife so that Satan would be represented, but with a curse of bondage.

=== Dress ===
FLDS members are known for their distinctive clothing and grooming, particularly women.

Men and women are forbidden to have any tattoos or body piercings. In general, women do not cut their hair short or wear makeup, trousers, or any skirt above the ankles. Men wear plain clothing, usually long-sleeved collared shirts and full-length trousers. Women and girls usually wear pastel-colored homemade long-sleeved prairie dresses, with hems between ankle and mid-calf, along with long stockings or trousers underneath, usually keeping their hair coiffed. The pastel colors are used to identify wives and daughters of a particular man.

These old-fashioned clothing styles are a relatively new development in the FLDS church. Photos from the 1953 Short Creek raid show FLDS women wearing clothing similar to contemporary fashions of the era, and with a greater variety of fabric patterns such as plaids or floral prints. In the 1950s, FLDS women also wore more individualized hairstyles in line with contemporary trends.

Carolyn Jessop, a former FLDS member, stated her opinion the restrictive clothing rules are "a way to control individuality" by making people more closely resemble each other.

== Criticism ==
=== Plural marriage ===
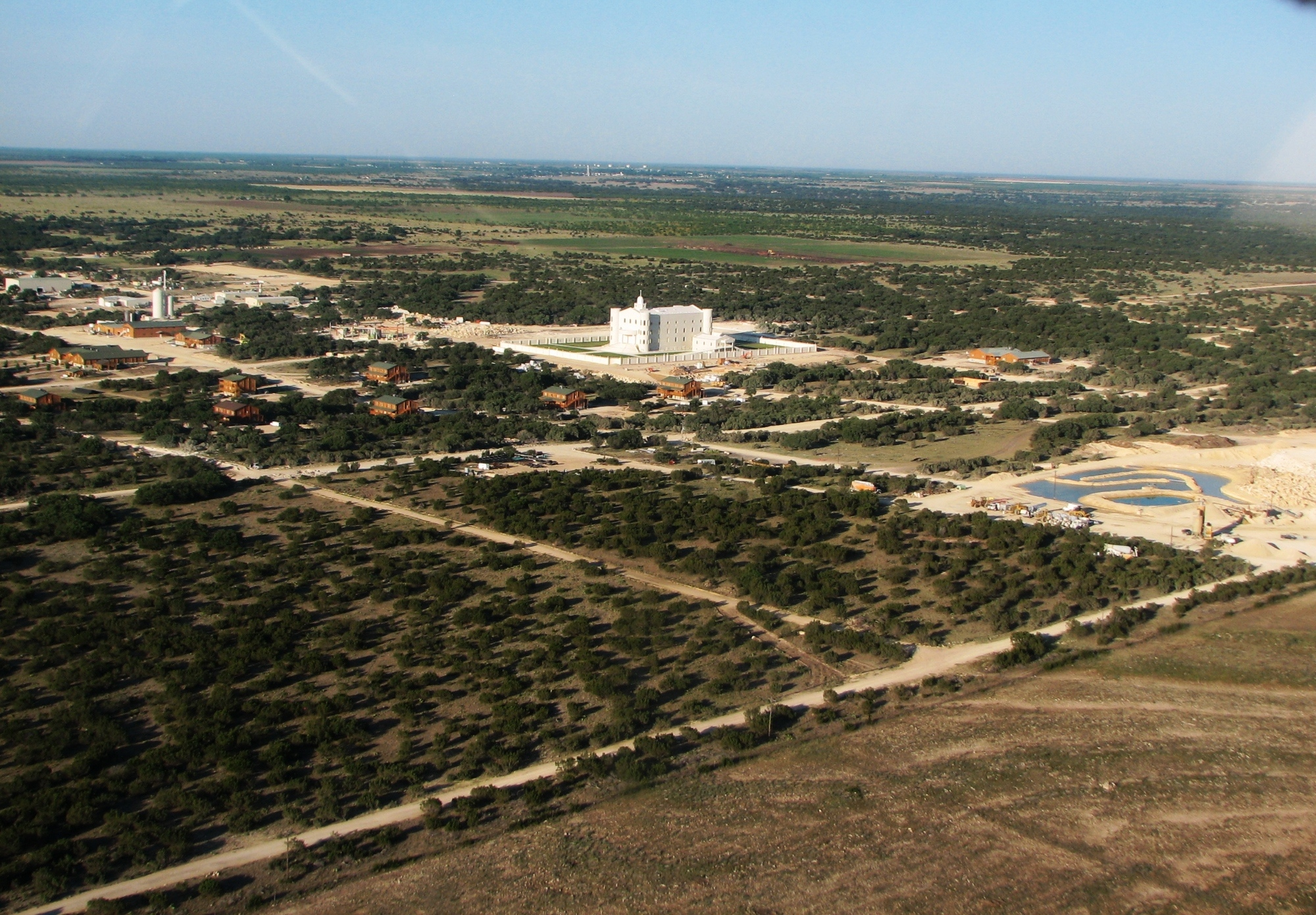
A view of the FLDS ranch in Eldorado, Texas

At the time of his death, FLDS Church leader Rulon Jeffs was confirmed to have married 46 women and fathered more than 60 children. It was estimated in 2018 that Warren Jeffs might have at least 79 wives. Because the type of polygamy which is practiced is actually polygyny, the practice of it inevitably leads to bride shortages, and FLDS members are additionally known to practice child marriages, incest, and child abuse.

The FLDS Church members are known to violate laws when they practice polygamy. Former members of the FLDS Church, including Warren Jeffs' son Wendell Jeffson, have testified that its members including Warren Jeffs himself, regularly practice incest and child sexual abuse.

In 2015, Lyle Jeffs's estranged wife Charlene Jeffs claimed in a custody dispute that the FLDS Church currently enforces a doctrine which only allows women to have sex with men who are members of the group appointed as "seed bearers", defined as "elect" men of a "worthy blood line chosen by the Priesthood to impregnate" women. Under this doctrine, men no longer are allowed to have children with their wives. Charlene Jeffs wrote in her custody petition: "It is the husband's responsibility to hold the hands of their wives while the seed bearer 'spreads his seed'. In layman terms, the husband is required to sit in the room while the chosen seed bearer, or a couple of them, rape his wife or wives." She also described the "Law of Sarah", in which FLDS women perform sex acts on each other in order to prepare for a sexual encounter with a man who is in the FLDS leadership. Lorin Holm, who claimed to have been part of Jeffs' "inner circle" before he was excommunicated from the group in 2011, later described the "Law of Sarah" practice in Jeffs's community as being akin to a lesbian sex show with Jeffs participating and sermonizing. Holm also said that mothers who would not take part were sent away to "redeem themselves", and their children were given to other women. This interpretation of the "Law of Sarah" differs from the "Law of Sarah" described in the 1843 polygamy revelation of Joseph Smith, in which Smith referred to the Law as a basis for consent to polygamous marriages by wives.

In 2022, FLDS Church leader Samuel Bateman was found to have 20 wives, which included underage girls, and, according to his family, also sought to marry his teenage daughter. According to criminal charges which were filed against him for destroying evidence linked to a federal investigation on sexual abuses, Bateman, who acted as the self-proclaimed "prophet" of a Colorado City-based splinter sect of the FLDS Church, used his position in the church to also sexually abuse 10 underage girls who he took as his wives in "atonement" ceremonies.

=== Sexual abuse of minors ===
The FLDS Church has been suspected of trafficking girls across state lines, and it has also been suspected of trafficking underage girls across the U.S. borders with Canada and Mexico, for the purpose of involuntary plural marriage and child sexual abuse. The Royal Canadian Mounted Police also suspects that the FLDS Church trafficked more than 30 underage girls from Canada to the United States between the late 1990s and 2006 so they could be entered into polygamous marriages. RCMP spokesman Dan Moskaluk said of the activities of the FLDS Church: "In essence, it's human trafficking in connection with illicit sexual activity." According to the Vancouver Sun, it is unclear whether Canada's anti-human trafficking statute can be effectively applied against the FLDS Church's pre-2005 activities, as it may not apply retroactively. An earlier three-year-long investigation by local authorities in British Columbia into allegations of sexual abuse, human trafficking, and forced marriages by the FLDS resulted in no charges, but did result in legislative change.

=== Welfare receipt ===
FLDS Church leaders have encouraged their flock to take advantage of government assistance in the form of welfare and the WIC (woman-infant-child) programs. In his book Under the Banner of Heaven (p. 15), Jon Krakauer writes that, "Fundamentalists call defrauding the government 'bleeding the beast' and regard it as a virtuous act." Carolyn Campbell ("Inside Polygamy in the '90s", 102) adds, "The attitude of some polygamists is 'the government is untrustworthy and corrupt, and I'm above it, but give me those food stamps and free medical care.'"

Since the government only recognizes one woman as the legal wife of a man, the rest of his wives are considered single mothers and, as a result, they are potentially eligible to receive government assistance. The more wives and children one has, the more welfare checks and food stamps one can receive. By 2003, for example, more than $6 million in public funds were being channeled into the community of Colorado City, Arizona.

=== Lost boys ===
Former members have reported that the FLDS Church has excommunicated more than 400 teenage boys for offenses such as dating or listening to rock music. The FLDS sect has exiled boys as young as 15 years old. These young men are known as Lost Boys due to being rejected by the family and community of their upbringing, and due to their frequent troubles integrating into larger society.

Some former members claim that the real motive for these excommunications is to ensure a sufficient female majority to allow for each male to marry three or more wives. In 2014, six men aged 18 to 22 filed a conspiracy lawsuit against Jeffs and Sam Barlow, a former Mohave County deputy sheriff and close associate of Jeffs, for the "systematic excommunication" of young men to reduce competition for wives.

=== Racism ===
In its Spring 2005 Intelligence Report, the Southern Poverty Law Center added the FLDS Church to its list of hate groups because of the church's doctrines, which include its fierce condemnation of interracial relationships. Warren Jeffs has said, "the black race is the people through which the devil has always been able to bring evil unto the earth".

=== Blood atonement ===
Former FLDS Church member Robert Richter reported to the Phoenix New Times that Warren Jeffs has repeatedly alluded to the 19th-century teaching of "blood atonement" in church sermons. Under the doctrine of blood atonement, certain serious sins, such as murder, can only be atoned for by the sinner's death.

=== Birth defects ===
The Colorado City/Hildale area has the world's highest incidence of fumarase deficiency, an extremely rare genetic disease. Geneticists attribute this to the prevalence of cousin marriages between descendants of two of the town's founders, Joseph Smith Jessop and John Yeates Barlow. It causes encephalopathy, severe intellectual disability, unusual facial features, brain malformation, and epileptic seizures.

=== Child labor abuses ===
On April 20, 2015, the U.S. Department of Labor assessed fines which totaled US$1.96 million against a group of FLDS Church members, including Lyle Jeffs, a brother of the church's controversial leader, Warren Jeffs, for alleged child labour violations which were committed during the church's 2012 pecan harvest at an orchard near Hurricane, Utah.

In April 2017, filings in U.S. District Court stated that Paragon Contractors, a company with ties to the FLDS Church, and Brian Jessop agreed to pay $200,000 in federal fines over the following year. These fines were levied against Paragon Contractors because it previously violated federal child labor laws. This settled a dispute with the U.S. Department of Labor hours before Paragon Contractors was due to face a potential contempt of court citation before a federal judge. The company was facing sanctions because in 2012, hundreds of children who were members of the Hildale-based FLDS Church were put to work harvesting pecans on a farm which was located in southern Utah under orders from FLDS Church leaders.

=== LDS Church's reaction ===
The Church of Jesus Christ of Latter-day Saints (LDS Church) has stated that "the polygamists and polygamist organizations in parts of the Western United States and Canada have no affiliation whatsoever with The Church of Jesus Christ of Latter-day Saints", and it has also declared that polygamy is strictly prohibited by the current doctrine of the LDS Church. Additionally, the LDS Church states that the term "Mormon" is incorrectly applied to the FLDS adherents and it also discourages its own members from using the term "Mormon" as a descriptive term for members of the LDS Church themselves.

== In popular culture ==
Popular media, including books and television programs, have focused on the FLDS Church.

- In 2011, the history of the FLDS Church was featured in Escaping Evil: My Life in a Cult on the Crime & Investigation Network cable channel.
- In 2013 and 2014, the TV Channel TLC aired two reality television series named Breaking the Faith and Escaping the Prophet. Both center on members of the FLDS leaving the group and adjusting to the outside world.
- On June 28, 2014, Lifetime premiered a new movie called Outlaw Prophet: Warren Jeffs which stars Tony Goldwyn as Warren Jeffs. Lifetime has also made an original movie titled Escape from Polygamy (2013) which is inspired by the FLDS.
- In 2017 "Evil Lives Here" (Season 2 Episode 3 'My Brother, the Devil') features Wallace Jeffs, half-brother to Warren Jeffs and nephew Brent Jeffs, revealing some of the horrors of the FLDS Church and the crimes of Warren Jeffs.
- On August 29, 2018, Great Big Story uploaded a short documentary-styled cinematic storytelling video titled "She Escaped a Cult and Now Helps Others", as part of its documentary series "Defenders" and follows Briell Decker, one of Warren Jeffs's 79 former wives, in her journey to help others walk out of the terrors that she experienced when she was a member of the church. She started the Short Creek Dream Center with Director Jena Jones to help other ex-FLDS members embrace freedom in one of Warren Jeffs's former homes through providing residents with counselling therapy sessions, meals, temporary lodging as well as future job preparations and arrangements.
- In 2022, Netflix premiered the documentary mini-series Keep Sweet: Pray and Obey which documents the rise and fall of Warren Jeffs, including testimony from investigators and escaped members of the church, and audio evidence from Warren Jeffs' trial for sexual assault of minors.
- In 2026, a Netflix documentary mini-series entitled Trust Me: The False Prophet was released. It follows Christine Marie, a cult expert, and filmmaker Tolga Katas during their undercover investigation of Samuel Bateman, the self-proclaimed heir to Warren Jeffs. The series features footage of Bateman and many of his wives, with those underage being digitally anonymized, and chronicles the evidence gathered against him in relation to child sexual abuse crimes.

== See also ==
- Big Love
- Caliente, Nevada: FLDS controversy
- Darger family
- Ruso, North Dakota
- Factional breakdown: Mormon fundamentalist sects
- Former FLDS members
- Keep Sweet: Pray and Obey (2022)—A Netflix series where survivors of the organization discuss their experiences in the organization.
- List of Mormon fundamentalist churches
- List of Mormon fundamentalist leaders
- Lost boys
- Prophet's Prey (2015)—A Showtime documentary about the life of Warren Jeffs with interviews from insiders and survivors.
- Sons of Perdition
- Under the Banner of Heaven

== Bibliography ==
- Quinn, D. Michael (1997). "Part 2: Family and Interpersonal Relationships – Plural Marriage and Mormon Fundamentalism". In Marty, Martin E.; Appleby, R. Scott (eds.). Fundamentalisms and Society: Reclaiming the Sciences, the Family, and Education. The Fundamentalism Project. Chicago and London: University of Chicago Press. pp. 240–293. ISBN 978-0-226-50881-8.
