= Lyle Jeffs =

American felon and FLDS bishop

Lyle Steed Jeffs
- Born: January 17, 1960 (age 66)
- Known for: FLDS involvement
- Parent(s): Rulon Jeffs and Marilyn Steed
- Relatives: Brothers Warren, Seth, Nephi; nephews Brent W. Jeffs, Helaman Jeffs

Lyle Jeffs is the brother of Warren Jeffs and a bishop in the Fundamentalist Church of Jesus Christ of Latter-Day Saints, commonly referred to as the FLDS Church. He has been referred to as his brother's "special counselor" in some church documents.

Jeffs was the FLDS bishop for both Hildale, Utah, and Colorado City, Arizona. According to The Salt Lake Tribune, he was removed from office in 2012. He was convicted and sentenced in 2017 to five years in prison for orchestrating a welfare fraud scheme.

Lyle is the son of Rulon Jeffs, who was president of the FLDS Church from 1986 until his death in 2002. Lyle is also the uncle of author and ex-FLDS member Brent W. Jeffs.

== Legal issues ==
On April 9, 2015, U.S. District Judge David Sam held Lyle Jeffs in contempt of court. In 2012, the United States Department of Labor began an investigation into the role of the FLDS Church and Jeffs in suspected child labor violations. A CNN report claimed that children were used to harvest nuts at the Southern Utah Pecan Ranch in 2012. Judge Sam ruled that Lyle Jeffs and his brother Nephi disobeyed subpoenas requiring them to answer questions from Labor Department investigators.

On April 20, 2015, the U.S. Department of Labor assessed fines totaling $1.96 million against a group of FLDS church members, including Lyle Jeffs, for alleged labor violations during the church's 2012 pecan harvest at an orchard near Hurricane, Utah.

Jeffs allegedly escaped house arrest in June 2016 by slipping out of an FBI ankle bracelet.

On June 14, 2017, Jeffs was arrested by the FBI in Yankton, South Dakota.

On September 20, 2017, Jeffs pleaded guilty as part of a plea deal to one count of defrauding the Supplemental Nutrition Assistance Program (SNAP) one count of failure to appear in court, while a money laundering charge was dismissed. Jeffs was sentenced on December 13, 2017, to nearly five years of prison, three years of probation, and $1 million in restitution. He was monitored by the Phoenix Residential Reentry Management field office, and was released on March 15, 2021.

== Notes ==
Fundamentalist Church of Jesus Christ of Latter Day Saints titles
Preceded by Rulon T. Jeffs	President in Charge; Warren Jeffs; 2002 – present With: Disputed interruptions by: Lyle Jeffs (designated acting president); William E. Jessop (once momentarily successor); Merril Jessop (once de facto head); Wendell L. Nielsen (one time head of temporal affairs)	Succeeded by incumbent Warren Jeffs
