= Child sexual abuse laws in the United States =

Child sexual abuse laws in the United States have been enacted as part of the nation's child protection policies.

== Child maltreatment ==
Child sexual abuse has been recognized specifically as a type of child maltreatment in U.S. federal law since the initial Congressional hearings on child abuse in 1973. Child sexual abuse is illegal in every state, as well as under federal law. Among the states, the specifics of child sexual abuse laws vary, but certain features of these laws are common to all states.

== Minors' inability to consent ==
Between adults, most sexual activity does not constitute a criminal offense, unless one of the adults does not consent to the activity. In contrast, minors are unable to give consent under the law. Indeed, the term "minor" refers to a person who has not yet reached majority, the age at which one may give consent in any legal matter (for example, a minor cannot make a valid contract). However, actual laws and the maximum ages that constitute breach of law vary by state. A person engaging in sexual activity with a minor below these proscribed ages (16–18), regardless of that minor's seeming "consent" or compliance, commits an offense (terminology varies). In most states, much more severe offenses and/or sentences exist for cases with young children, approximately under 12–13.

Many states include in their penal codes a "Romeo and Juliet" exception for cases where sexual activity occurs between a young adult and a minor whose ages are within a few years of each other. This exception typically bars charging the young adult with a sex offense, if the young adult did not use force or coercion on the minor and the minor is a teenager.

== Incest ==
Incest is a criminal offense in most states. In the majority of states with incest laws, a perpetrator of intrafamilial child sexual abuse may be prosecuted for incest instead of child sexual abuse offenses. Such crimes are most commonly addressed in family courts, as opposed to criminal courts, although no laws prohibit simultaneous proceedings in both forums. A related perpetrator, if convicted under the state's incest law, will receive a significantly lower penalty for committing the same acts that constitute criminal child sexual abuse in that state. Recognizing this loophole, some states have altered their penal codes to prohibit prosecution of intrafamilial child sexual abuse under the incest statutes. In these states, which include Arkansas, California, Illinois, New York, and North Carolina, all perpetrators of sexual offenses against children are prosecuted under the same laws, without regard to whether they are related to their victims. These states retain their incest laws only for their original purpose: to prohibit sexual activity between those too closely related by blood.

== Penalties for child sexual abuse ==
US map of states that have passed Death Penalty laws for child rapists as of 2026, though it will be judicially unenforceable unless Kennedy v. Louisiana is overturned.

There are an estimated sixty million victims of child sexual abuse in America. Penalties for child sexual abuse vary with the specific offenses for which the perpetrator has been convicted. Criminal penalties may include imprisonment, fines, registration as a sex offender, and restrictions on probation and parole. Civil penalties may include liability for damages, injunctions, involuntary commitment, and, for perpetrators related to their victims, loss of custody or parental rights.

During the last three decades many state legislatures have increased prison terms and other penalties for child sex offenders. This trend toward more stringent sentences generally targets those perpetrators who are repeat offenders, who victimize multiple children, or who stood in a position of trust with respect to their victims, such as a guardian, parent, pastor, or teacher. In Colorado, lawmakers proposed a new law allowing the death penalty for repeat offenders. However, the bill was rejected by the state senate. Social workers argued that in intra-familial abuse, the victims could be intimidated by their abuser into thinking their family member would be killed if they reported the abuse.

In 2023, Florida Governor Ron DeSantis signed a bill that allows the possibility of the death penalty for the rape of a child under 12 years of age, though it will be judicially unenforceable unless Kennedy is overturned.

In 2024, 2025 and 2026 Tennessee Idaho and Alabama passed similar laws.

== Additional Statutes ==
In the United States, 18 U.S.C. § 2422(b) makes it a federal offence to use the mail, interstate commerce, etc. to entice a minor to sexual activity for which any person can be charged with a criminal offence. 18 U.S.C. § 2425 makes it a federal offence to transmit information about a person below the age of 16 for this purpose.

Some states have additional statutes covering seducing a child online, such as the Florida law that makes "Use of a Computer to Seduce a Child" a felony.

The Adam Walsh Child Protection and Safety Act of 2006 § 2252A(a)(6) has provisions to prevent the distribution of pornography to children for the purpose of persuading them to engage in illegal activity. It was first enforced federally against Alabamian Jerry Alan Penton in 2009. Penton received 20 years in prison for that action coupled with another 20 for his distribution and possession of child pornography.

== Court Cases ==
=== Kansas v. Hendricks ===
The U.S. Supreme Court ruled in Kansas v. Hendricks that a predatory sex offender can be civilly committed upon release from prison. The Supreme Court ruled in Stogner v. California that California's ex post facto law, a retroactive extension of the statute of limitations for sexual offenses committed against minors, is unconstitutional.

The case requires law enforcement to release information about sex offenders. It is a modification of the Jacob Wetterling Crimes Against Children and Sexually Violent Offender Registration Act, which specifies that information about both sexual offenders and individuals committing crimes against children must be released.

=== Kennedy v. Louisiana ===
The USA Supreme Court in a 5–4 judgment penned by Justice Anthony Kennedy on June 25, 2008, prohibited executions of individuals convicted of child rape: "the death penalty is not a proportional punishment for the rape of a child, despite the horrendous nature of the crime." Kennedy reserved capital punishment only "for crimes that involve a victim's death." In this Louisiana case, Patrick Kennedy raped his 8-year-old stepdaughter, resulting in serious injuries which required surgery. 44 states prohibit death penalty for any kind of rape, but Louisiana and 4 other states permit it for child rape — Montana, Oklahoma, South Carolina and Texas. There's disagreement over the status of a Georgia law permitting execution for child rape, but Justice Kennedy ruled it was still in force. The court, thus declared unconstitutional the Louisiana statute (La. Stat. Ann. §14:42, West 1997 and Supp. 1998): "the Eighth Amendment bars Louisiana from imposing the death penalty for the rape of a child where the crime did not result, and was not intended to result, in the victim’s death."

Opponents have criticized the decision, noting an admission by the Justice Department that they had failed to note that the US Congress had made child rape a capital offense under military law as recently as 2006, which opponents claim contradicts the "evolving standards of decency" justification for the decision.
