= Purgatory Correctional Facility =

County jail in Utah, United States

Coordinates: 37°09′30″N 113°24′44″W

Purgatory Correctional Facility is the county jail of Washington County, Utah. Also known as the Washington County Jail, it is located near St. George, Utah, at Purgatory Flats, hence its unusual name.

Technically lying within the borders of Hurricane, Utah, the facility is about halfway between downtown St. George and downtown Hurricane at Harrisburg Junction (the junction of I-15 and SR-9). It has a semi-rural setting in the shadow of a steep ridge, part of the Virgin Rivers anticline. The Virgin River flows north of the ridge.

Purgatory Correctional Facility has a typical occupancy of 400 to 500 inmates, with 150 employees and a full-time medical clinic. The estimated cost of the facility, completed in 1998, was $11,570,000. It was designed by the architectural firm of Gillies, Stransky, Brems & Smith of Salt Lake City. The Correctional Facility is located within a business park area.

The facility has both male and female inmates.

In 2005, the facility had a recidivism rate of 75 percent.

The Purgatory jail made headlines in 2006 when it was used for the incarceration for the cult leader and child sex offender Warren Jeffs, following his flight from justice. He was kept there for twelve months before his trial and conviction for two first degree felony counts of rape, at which time he was transferred to Utah State Prison.

In 2008, the Sheriff's Office began charging inmates money to be incarcerated at the jail – a practice known as "pay to stay". The Washington County Sheriff's Chief Deputy said the purpose of the fees was to cut operating costs and reduce recidivism. Inmates were charged $45 per day and were given a 10% discount for good behavior and a 10% discount for enrolling in education programs. There was also a substantial discount for providing full payment. The discounts could be combined, to result in up to a 70% discount. However, the Deseret News reported that one problem that was worrying the officials was whether they would actually be able to collect the money, since the inmates are often rather poor people.

In fact, this was not the first time that a pay-to-stay fee system was established at the jail, which also had a similar fee system in place as early as 1999, the year after the facility was opened. It is not clear what happened to that earlier plan.
