= Rulon Jeffs =

Fundamentalist Mormon church leader (1909–2002)

- Jeffs, ca. 2002

Prophet and President of the Fundamentalist Church of Jesus Christ of Latter-Day Saints
- November 25, 1986 – September 8, 2002
- Predecessor: Leroy S. Johnson
- Successor: Warren Steed Jeffs

Personal details
- Born: Rulon Timpson Jeffs; December 6, 1909; Salt Lake City, Utah, U.S.
- Died: September 8, 2002 (aged 92); St. George, Utah, U.S.
- Resting place: Isaac W. Carling Memorial Park; 36.9905°N 112.9671°W
- Spouse(s): 65, including Rebecca Musser
- Children: As many as 65, including Warren, Seth, Nephi, and Lyle Jeffs
- Parents: David William Ward Jeffs; Nettie Lenora Timpson

Rulon Timpson Jeffs (December 6, 1909 – September 8, 2002), known to followers as Uncle Rulon, was an American polygamist leader who founded and was recognized as the 8th president of the Fundamentalist Church of Jesus Christ of Latter-Day Saints (FLDS Church), a Mormon fundamentalist group based in Colorado City, Arizona, United States, from 1986 until his death in 2002. He was the father of later FLDS Prophet Warren Jeffs.

== Biography ==
Rulon Jeffs was born in Salt Lake City, Utah, on December 6, 1909, the son of first generation Mormon fundamentalist David William Ward Jeffs, who was the son of William Yemm Jeffs of Brierley Hill, England; and David Jeffs's plural wife, Nettie Lenora Timpson. The elder Jeffs lived his polygamous lifestyle in secret, and Rulon spent the first ten years of his life under the pseudonym Rulon Jennings. Jeffs was raised a member of the Church of Jesus Christ of Latter-day Saints (LDS Church), and served in the British mission from June 1930 to August 1932.

Jeffs's father did not introduce him to the teachings of Mormon fundamentalism until September 25, 1938, at the elder Jeffs's birthday dinner, where he presented his son with a copy of Joseph W. Musser's Truth magazine. Jeffs embraced the fundamentalist message after meeting Musser and John Y. Barlow. In 1940, he secretly took a plural wife, for which his first wife, Zola Brown, daughter of LDS Church apostle Hugh B. Brown; and great-granddaughter of Brigham Young, divorced him.

In the spring of 1945, Jeffs, who had been working in northern Idaho since 1943, returned to Salt Lake City, where he was ordained a high priest apostle by Barlow on April 19. Jeffs was a protege of both Barlow and later Priesthood Council senior Leroy S. Johnson, who compared their relationship to that of Brigham Young and Heber C. Kimball. Jeffs assumed the leadership of the group after Johnson's death in 1986.

It was reported that at the time of Jeffs's death at age 92 he'd had 65 wives and 65 children; other sources indicate that he may have been survived by 60 wives and "about 60 children," including 33 sons. According to author Jon Krakauer, who chronicles the FLDS Church and the Jeffs family in Under the Banner of Heaven, several of Jeffs's wives were underage, as young as 14, at the time they were married to him. Shortly after his death, one of Jeffs's sons, Warren Jeffs, asserted his own leadership of the FLDS Church and subsequently married all but two of his father's widows, solidifying his political position in the community.

Jeffs was buried at the Isaac W. Carling Memorial Park in Colorado City.

== Works ==
- Jeffs, Rulon (1996). Sermons of President Rulon Jeffs (8 vols.). Hildale, Utah: Twin City Courier Press.
- Jeffs, Rulon (1997). History of Priesthood Succession in the Dispensation of the Fullness of Times and Some Challenges to the One Man Rule. Also Includes Personal History of President Rulon Jeffs. Hildale, Utah: Twin City Courier Press.
- Jeffs, Rulon (2000). Priesthood Articles. Hildale, Utah: Twin City Courier Press.

== See also ==
- List of Mormon fundamentalist leaders

Fundamentalist Church of Jesus Christ of Latter Day Saints titles
Preceded by Leroy S. Johnson as Senior Member of the Priesthood Council (Short Creek Community)	Prophet and President; November 25, 1986–September 8, 2002	Succeeded by Warren Steed Jeffs
