= YFZ Ranch =

Former Fundamentalist Church of Jesus Christ of Latter-Day Saints community in Texas

Coordinates: 30.9215°N 100.5348°W

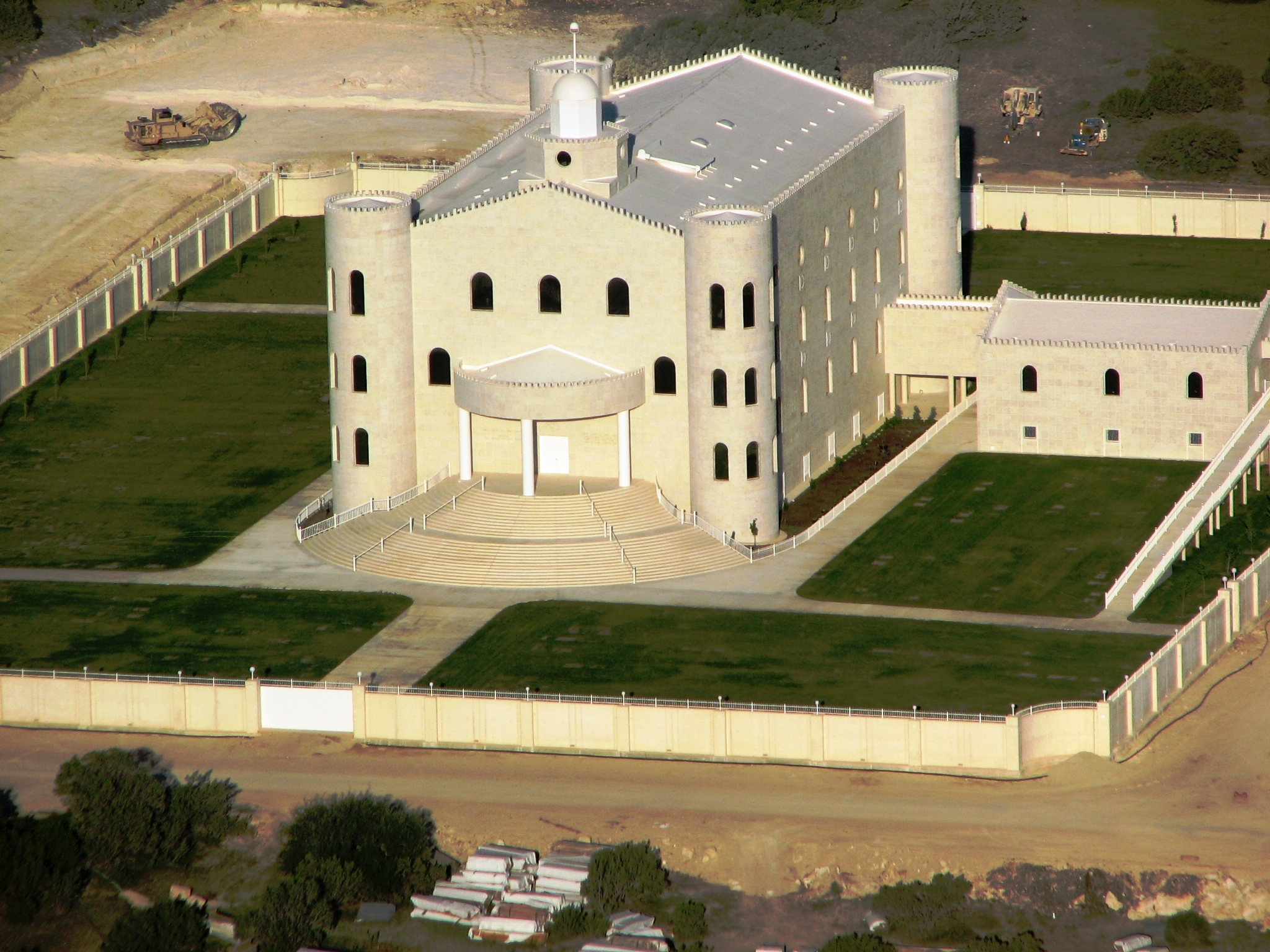
The FLDS temple in the YFZ Ranch

The Yearning for Zion Ranch, or the YFZ Ranch, was a 1,700-acre (690-hectare) Fundamentalist Church of Jesus Christ of Latter-Day Saints (FLDS) cult community of as many as 700 people, located near Eldorado in Schleicher County, Texas, United States. In April 2014, the State of Texas took physical and legal possession of the property. As of 2019, the property was in the process of being sold to the Dallas-based firm ETG Properties LLC, who were already leasing it for use as a military and law enforcement training facility.

== Background ==
The YFZ Ranch was situated 45 miles (72 kilometers) southwest of San Angelo and four miles (six kilometers) northeast of Eldorado. The Ranch was settled by members of the FLDS Church who left Hildale, Utah, and Colorado City, Arizona, under increasing scrutiny from the media, anti-polygamy activists and law enforcement officials.

== Creation of property ==
Speaking in Sunday church services on August 10, 2003, Warren Jeffs declared that the blessings of the priesthood had been removed from the community of Short Creek (Colorado City and Hildale). Following the sermon, Jeffs suspended all further religious meetings but continued to allow his followers to pay their tithes and offerings to him. He then turned his focus to what he called "lands of refuge": secret communities that he had started to build up. Jeffs referred to Yearning for Zion Ranch, one of the lands of refuge, by the code name R17.

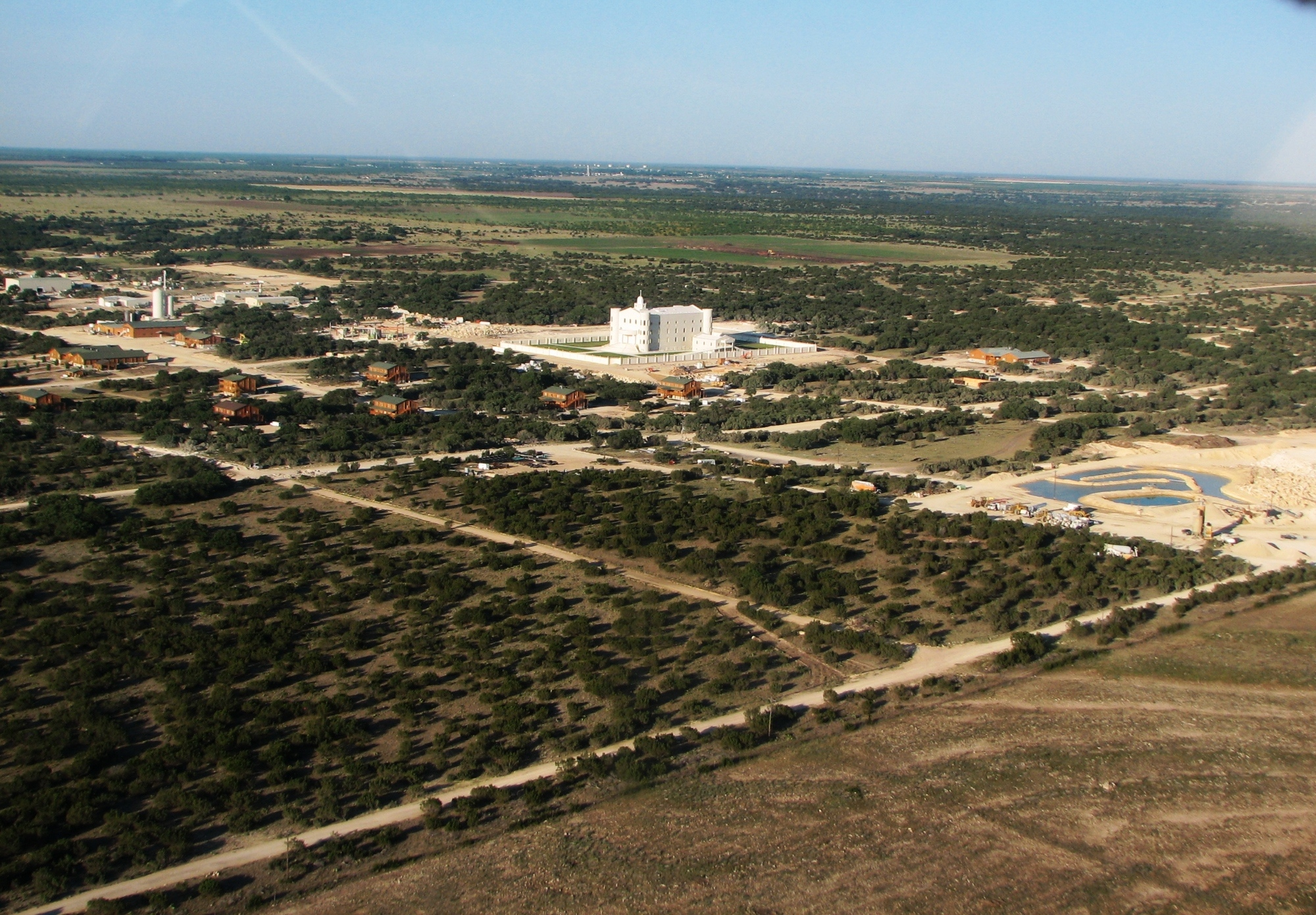
Aerial view of the FLDS ranch

The YFZ Land LLC, through its president, David S. Allred, purchased the ranch in 2003 for $700,000 and quickly began development on the property. When he purchased the property, he declared that the buildings would be a corporate hunting retreat. Allred stuck with the deceptive story even after William Benjamin Johnson, a Hildale man, was alleged to be shooting all the white-tail deer on the ranch and, after an investigation, was fined for hunting without a license. Later, ranch officials disclosed that the hunting retreat description was inaccurate; the buildings were part of the FLDS Church's residential area.

The ranch was home to approximately 500 people who relocated from Arizona and Utah communities. It housed a temple, a waste treatment facility, a 29,000 sq ft (2,700 m^{2}) house for FLDS Church president Warren Jeffs, a meeting house, and several large log and concrete homes. There were generators, gardens, a grain silo, and a large stone quarry that was cut for the temple. According to preliminary tax assessments, about $3 million worth of buildings had been built. The sect was fined over $34,000 for environmental violations in connection with buildings on the ranch, mainly due to its failure to obtain the required permits for its concrete-mixing operations.

The temple foundation was dedicated January 1, 2005, by Jeffs.

== April 2008 raid ==
On March 29, 2008, a local domestic violence shelter hotline took a call from a woman, identifying herself as "Sarah", and claiming to be a 16-year-old victim of physical and sexual abuse at the church's YFZ Ranch. Investigators eventually established by tracing the calls that they were placed by a much older woman, Rozita Swinton, who had been arrested for previous hoax calls posing as abused and victimized girls. The call triggered a large-scale operation at YFZ Ranch by Texas law enforcement and child welfare officials, beginning with cordoning off of the ranch on April 3. SWAT teams, tactical vehicles, and police helicopters were deployed to the ranch in anticipation of armed resistance from the church members, but there was none. Authorities believed the children "had been abused or were at immediate risk of future abuse", a state spokesman said. Troopers and child welfare officials searched the ranch, including the temple's safes, vaults, locked desk drawers, and beds. They found evidence leading them to believe that the beds were "in a part of the temple where 'males over the age of 17 engage in sexual activity' with underage girls". A religious scholar later testified in court that he did not think sexual activity occurs in the temples of FLDS sects, and that temple service "lasts a couple of hours, so all the temples will have a place where someone can lie down". Child Protective Services (CPS) officials conceded that there was no evidence that the youngest children were abused (about 130 of the children were under 5), and evidence later presented in a custody hearing suggested that teenage boys were not physically or sexually abused.

CPS spokesman Darrell Azar stated, "There was a systematic process going on to groom these young girls to become brides", and that the children could not be protected from possible future abuse on the ranch. Interviews with the children "revealed that several underage girls were forced into 'spiritual marriage' with much older men as soon as they reached puberty and were then made pregnant". After Judge Barbara Walther of the 51st District Court issued an order authorizing officials to remove all children, including boys, 17 years old and under, from the ranch, eventually a total of 462 children went into the temporary custody of the State of Texas. The children were held by the Child Protective Services at Fort Concho and the Wells Fargo Pavilion in San Angelo. Over a hundred adult women chose to leave the ranch to accompany the children. Children under the age of four were allowed to stay with their mothers until DNA testing to identify family relations was finished; once DNA testing was completed, only children under 18 months were allowed to stay with their mothers indefinitely.

A former member of the FLDS Church, Carolyn Jessop, arrived on-site April 6 in hopes of reuniting two of her daughters with their half siblings. She stated that the actions in Texas were unlike the 1953 Short Creek raid in Arizona. Jessop had been in Texas the prior month at a speaking engagement, where she said, "[i]n Eldorado, the crimes went to a whole new level. They thought they could get away with more" but "Texas is not going to be a state that's as tolerant of these crimes as Arizona and Utah have been." By April 8, authorities had removed as many as 533 women and children from the ranch. On April 10, law enforcement completed their search of the ranch, returning control of the property to the FLDS Church.

=== Mandamus of Judge Walther ===
Represented by Texas RioGrande Legal Aid, mothers of the removed children sought a writ of mandamus against Judge Walther for her rulings because parents in Texas cannot simply appeal an emergency removal. Mandamus is available only when it is abundantly clear a state official abused his or her power.

On May 22, 2008, an appeals court issued a writ of mandamus to Judge Walther and found that there was not enough evidence at the original hearing that the children were in immediate danger to justify keeping them in state custody. The court added that Judge Walther had abused her discretion by keeping the children in state care. The court ruled, "The department did not present any evidence of danger to the physical health and safety of any male children or any female children who had not reached puberty." The children were to be returned to their families in 10 days. CPS announced they would seek to overturn the decision. On May 29, the Texas Supreme Court declined to issue a mandamus to the Appeals Court, with a result that CPS was required to return all of the children. The court stated, "On the record before us, removal of the children was not warranted." The court also noted that although the children must be returned, "it need not do so without granting other appropriate relief to protect the children".

On May 12–15, 2009, a hearing was held in Tom Green County, Texas, regarding the constitutionality and legality of search warrants executed in April 2008 on the YFZ Ranch in Schleicher County, Texas. On October 2, 2009, Judge Barbara Walther issued a ruling denying a defense motion to suppress the evidence seized from the YFZ Ranch, stating:

The court finds that Defendants' offer of proof of deliberate falsehoods contained within the probable cause affidavits to support the two warrants is unsupported by credible evidence.

On November 10, 2009, Raymond Jessop was sentenced to 10 years in prison and fined $8,000 for sexually assaulting a 16-year-old girl on or about November 19, 2004. On December 18, 2009, Allan Keate was sentenced to 33 years in prison. He fathered a child with a 15-year-old girl.

On January 22, 2010, Michael George Emack pleaded no contest to sexual assault charges and was sentenced to seven years in prison. He married a 16-year-old girl at YFZ Ranch on August 5, 2004. She gave birth to a son less than a year later. On April 14, 2010, Emack also pleaded no contest on a bigamy charge and received a seven-year sentence that will run concurrently with the sentence he received for sexually assaulting a 16-year-old girl.

On February 5, 2010, Arizona Judge Steven F. Conn approved a stipulation from the previous day between Mohave County prosecutor Matt Smith and Warren Jeffs' defense attorney, Michael Piccarreta, that evidence seized from the YFZ Ranch in Texas would not be used in any manner in Warren Jeffs' two criminal trials in Arizona. Based on the agreement of the attorneys, Judge Conn issued an order adopting the stipulation. A Utah court found Jeffs guilty of two counts of rape as an accomplice in September 2007. He was sentenced to imprisonment for 10 years to life but while serving this sentence at the Utah State Prison, Jeffs' conviction was reversed by Utah's Supreme Court on July 27, 2010, because of a flaw in the jury instructions. Jeffs was extradited to Texas, to face trial on charges facing him there. The Texas jury found him guilty of sexual assault and aggravated sexual assault of children. He was sentenced to life in prison plus twenty years, to be served consecutively, and a $10,000 fine, for sexual assault of both 12 and 15-year-old girls.

On March 19, 2010, Merril Leroy Jessop was sentenced to 75 years in prison for one count of sexual assault of a child. Jessop was convicted of illegally marrying and then fathering a child with a 15-year-old female.

On April 15, 2010, Lehi Barlow Jeffs pleaded no contest to bigamy and sexual assault of a child, avoiding a trial that had been set for April 26. He was sentenced to eight years in prison.

On June 22, 2010, Abram Harker Jeffs was found guilty of sexual assault of a child.

On August 9, 2011, leader Warren Steed Jeffs was found guilty of one count of aggravated sexual assault of a child and one count of sexual assault of a child and sentenced to life in prison plus 20 years to be served consecutively.

=== Controversy ===
==== Rozita Swinton ====
Rozita Swinton of Colorado Springs had previously made calls pretending to be a young girl. She was under investigation for posing as the caller "Sarah" who complained of abuse, but she could not be found. FLDS women did not know of any such girl and assumed that it was a prank call. Sarah was considered a real person by CPS until May when her court case was dropped, effectively acknowledging that she does not actually exist. Swinton has previously been responsible for hoax calls to authorities in multiple jurisdictions, setting off large emergency responses that sometimes involved dozens of police officers. Flora Jessop also had recorded nearly 40 hours of Swinton's phone calls to her, both before and after the raid on the YFZ ranch. Swinton posed alternately as "Sarah Barlow" and her sister Laura. She claimed that her 50-year-old husband beat and raped her and that his other wives tried to poison her. Swinton herself was 33 at the time, unmarried, and childless.

The Associated Press reported that Texas Ranger Brooks Long called Colorado officials about two phone numbers, one of which "was possibly related to the reporting party for the YFZ Ranch incident". However, the CPS acted on additional evidence gathered while investigating this complaint, and Flora Jessop and some commentators have expressed gratitude to Swinton that her tip, even if false, allowed exposure of child abuses.

==== Age dispute and Child Protective Services ====
CPS has acknowledged that some ranch residents who were removed because they appeared to be minors may be older than first assumed. On May 13, Louisa Bradshaw Jessop gave birth to a son. Louisa Jessop had been classified as 17 by CPS, although her husband had previously provided a birth certificate and driver's license to demonstrate that she was 22. A CPS lawyer explained, "We can't just look at people and say, 'You're of age, you can go.'" A spokesman for FLDS believed that CPS "just wanted to keep the mother in custody until they could get the baby". Jessop was one of 27 "disputed minors", or ranch residents about whom the CPS has inaccurate or conflicting information regarding age. Child Protective Services lawyers on May 13 told Judge Walther that Louisa and the mother of a boy born April 29 were no longer considered to be minors. On May 22, CPS declared half of the alleged teen mothers to be adults, some as old as 27. One who had been listed as an underage mother had never been pregnant.

==== Other criticism ====
Many FLDS members and supporters see the raid and the seizure of the children from their family as religious persecution and have likened it to a witch-hunt.

In May 2008, FLDS spokesperson Willie Jessop wrote a letter to President George W. Bush, asking him to intervene, and outlining the harsh conditions that Jessop believed that the children and mothers were subjected to. In the letter Jessop claimed that, contrary to statements from authorities that the children were being placed in a safe and secure environment, the mothers and children were actually crowded by the hundreds into Fort Concho, a military facility without adequate toilets, bathing facilities, or privacy.

Mental health workers who worked at the shelter testified similarly to state officials, also citing lack of privacy, only military cots for sleeping and poor-quality food, with no communications and threatened arrest if mothers waved to friends. Workers took notes on everything the "guests" said. In many of the testimonies it was compared to a prison or concentration camp.

The Christian legal group Liberty Legal Institute took the position that the state of Texas should be required to prove that the children taken from the ranch were actually abused or were in imminent danger. Liberty Legal warned of possible damage to religious liberties and the rights of all Texas parents. Home-schooling families were also fearful that opponents could file similarly false complaints against families to force attendance in government-run schools.

Utah Attorney General Mark Shurtleff disagreed with the removal:

Let's say you're a 6-month-old girl, no evidence whatsoever of any abuse. They're simply saying, "You, in this culture, may grow up to be a child bride when you're 14. Therefore we're going to remove you now when you're 6 months old" ... Or, "You're a 6-month-old boy; 25, 30 years, 40 years from now you're going to be a predator, so we're going to take you away now."

Texas requires public education for children not in private or home schooling. Although the children had not been schooled while in state custody, a Texas Education Agency spokesman has stated that "there's a point at which their educational input is secondary" to their emotional well-being. CPS anticipates that the children will continue their education on the campus of their foster placement. There were no plans for the children to attend classes on any public school campus.

The ACLU maintains that the raid was prompted by a single, unsubstantiated allegation of abuse, and they allege that all children at the ranch were believed at risk solely because of exposure to FLDS beliefs regarding underage marriage. But, the ACLU contends, "exposure to a religion's beliefs, however unorthodox, is not itself abuse and may not constitutionally be labeled abuse". The ACLU pointed out that parents were separated from their children without individual hearings and without particularized evidence of abuse, and that DNA testing was ordered without evidence that parentage was in dispute. Such actions, the ACLU asserts, "should not be indiscriminately targeted against a group as a whole – particularly when the group is perceived as being different or unusual".

=== Commentary ===
At the beginning of May, National Review columnist John Derbyshire called the raid the "atrocity of the [previous] month", but said he had seen only one editorial critical of the removals. The Los Angeles Times editorially endorsed the appeals court decision, saying CPS "was overzealous in its efforts".

Several commentators compared the raid with the Short Creek raid of 1953, which was also a government raid on an FLDS community, and which led to a popular backlash against the raid.

=== Post-raid events ===
On April 14, 2008, the women and children were moved out of Fort Concho to San Angelo Coliseum, where the CPS reported that the children were playing and smiling. Mothers had complained about the living conditions inside Fort Concho, sending a letter to the Texas Governor asking him to investigate the conditions. In the letter, obtained by the Associated Press, the mothers claim that their children became sick and required hospitalization. They wrote "Our innocent children are continually being questioned on things they know nothing about. The physical examinations were horrifying to the children. The exposure to these conditions is traumatizing." FLDS and mental health workers complained about subjecting children to interrogation sessions, invasive physical examinations, pregnancy tests and complete body X-rays. Women staying at Fort Concho shelter told the press that the temporary housing was "cramped, with cots, cribs, and playpens lined up side by side, and that the children were frightened".

The FLDS described the separation of mothers from their children as "inhumane". When the children under 5 realized their mothers would be taken away, the children started crying and screaming, requiring CPS workers to pry many from their mothers.

The children were placed in 16 group shelters and foster homes. Minors with children were sent to the Seton Home in San Antonio, older boys to Cal Farley's Boys Ranch in Amarillo. Some parents stated on the Today Show that they were unable to visit their boys due to a shortage of CPS staff. Newspapers released names of facilities caring for the FLDS children that have requested donations of specific items, help or cash.

On April 16, 2008, several of the mothers appeared on Larry King Live to ask for their children and tell their story from their own viewpoint. The program included a guided tour of the ranch by one of the mothers, showing where the children and families sleep and eat and stressing the loss felt with the children all now gone. The mothers declined to discuss the pending allegations of child abuse. On the 17th, a custody hearing began in the Tom Green County Courthouse to determine whether the children would remain in state custody. Judge Barbara Walther heard testimony from State officials, experts called in by the State and witnesses for ranch members over a period of 2 days while hundreds of lawyers representing the children looked on and offered objections. State officials alleged a pattern of abuse by adults, including marriages between young girls and older men, while ranch residents insisted that no abuse had taken place.

On April 18, 2008, after 21 hours of testimony, Judge Walther ordered that all 416 children seized be held in protective custody and that the DNA of the children and adults be tested to establish family relationships. Children younger than 4 were to be separated from their mothers over 18 after DNA samples were taken; older children had already been separated. Children were to be given individual hearings to determine whether they must be moved to permanent foster care or returned to their parents. DNA testing of children and adults began on the 21st.

On April 24, 2008, authorities stated that they believed 25 mothers from the YFZ Ranch were under 18. On the 28th, authorities announced that of the 53 girls aged 14–17, 31 have children or were pregnant.

After the women regained custody of the children, one half of the families left the Yearning for Zion ranch and moved to another FLDS location.

Carey Cockerell, representing Texas CPS investigators, said on April 30 that they have identified 41 children with past diagnoses of fractured bones. FLDS spokesman Rod Parker attributes the fractures to hereditary bone disease and believes that the fracture rate was low, considering the children's physically active lifestyle. Additionally, two children broke bones while they were removed from the ranch, and one girl broke a bone while in custody. CPS investigators also made new allegations of possible sexual abuse of boys, citing their diary notes.

On May 13, 2008, a San Antonio judge allowed a couple from the ranch to have daily visits with their children, and granted them a hearing in 10 days to decide their children's custody. Other challenges to the blanket order by Judge Walther were filed in courts in San Antonio, Austin, and San Angelo.

In November 2008, 12 FLDS men were charged with offenses related to underage marriages.

On December 22, 2008, The Texas Department of Family and Protective Services issued a 21-page final report on the raid entitled "El Dorado Investigation". The report found that "12 girls were 'spiritually' married at ages ranging from 12 to 15, and seven of these girls have had one or more children. The 12 confirmed victims of sexual abuse were among 43 girls removed from the ranch from the ages of 12 to 17, which means that more than one out of every four pubescent girls on the ranch was in an underage marriage."

==== Resolution ====
A year after the raid, two thirds of the families were back at the ranch and sect leaders had promised to end underaged marriages. Twelve men, not all apparently from the ranch, had been indicted on a variety of sex charges, including assault and bigamy. One child, a 14-year-old girl who was married to jailed leader Warren Jeffs when she was 12, remained in foster care. The following summer, 2009, she was sent to live with a relative and ordered not to have contact with Jeffs.

== Seizure ==
In November 2012, the Texas Attorney General's Office began legal proceeding in an attempt to seize the ranch. In a 91-page affidavit filed with the 51st District Court of Texas, the Attorney General argues that Warren Jeffs authorized the purchase of the ranch property as "... a rural location where the systemic sexual assault of children would be tolerated without interference from law enforcement authorities", therefore, the property was contraband and subject to seizure. Under Texas law, property that was used to commit or facilitate certain criminal conduct can be seized by law enforcement authorities. In 2012 the property was appraised to have a value of $19.96 million, according to county tax rolls.

On January 6, 2014, Judge Walther ruled that the state could seize the property, and that they could "enter the property and take an inventory." The FLDS Church had 30 days to appeal. On February 6, 2014, at the close of the courthouse day, the opportunity to appeal the seizure expired; since no one had filed an appeal challenging the seizure by that time, the state of Texas became the legal owner of the YFZ Ranch. Officials did not release details about their future plans for the ranch at that time. On April 16, 2014, officials met with two representatives of the remaining eight adult residents and discussed arrangements for them to vacate the premises, and the following day (April 17) the State of Texas took physical possession of the property.

In 2018, the ranch was reported as being disused, with the county, city and school district disappointed with the loss of tax revenue – properties owned by the State are exempt from local taxation, so the property became tax-exempt when state authorities seized it. In 2019, it was reported as having been leased and in the process of being sold to the Dallas-based firm ETG Properties LLC, who were providing it to the military and law enforcement for training use.

== See also ==
- Under the Banner of Heaven: A Story of Violent Faith, a book of investigative non-fiction published in 2003 which documents incidents of violence and abuse connected with the FLDS.
- Lost boys, young men who have been excommunicated or pressured to leave polygamous groups such as the FLDS, though no documented cases were related to the YFZ Ranch.
