= List of Latter Day Saint practitioners of plural marriage =

According to a consensus of history, many adherents in the early Latter Day Saint movement practiced plural marriage, a doctrine that states that polygyny is ordained of God. Although the largest denomination in the movement, The Church of Jesus Christ of Latter-day Saints, officially abandoned the practice of plural marriage in 1890, a number of churches in the Mormon fundamentalist movement continue to teach and practice it. Historically, the Reorganized Church of Jesus Christ of Latter Day Saints (now the Community of Christ), the second largest denomination in the movement, had an anti-polygamy position.

== Pre-succession crisis ==
The following notable Latter Day Saints are alleged to have practiced plural marriage prior to the 1844 succession crisis that followed the death of Joseph Smith, Jr.

Name:	Joseph Smith
Born:	December 23, 1805
Died:	June 27, 1844 (aged 38)
Positions:	1st President of the Church of Christ (later the Church of Jesus Christ of Latter Day Saints), April 6, 1830 – June 27, 1844
Date entered polygamy:	April 5, 1841
Eventual No. of wives:	33
Notes:	Founder of the Latter Day Saint movement. Also Mayor of Nauvoo, Illinois (1842–1844). Commonly believed to have married at least 30 wives before his death and to have taught the doctrine to his close associates, although he publicly denied teaching or practicing polygamy.
Name:	Hyrum Smith
Born:	February 9, 1800
Died:	June 27, 1844 (aged 44)
Positions:	Assistant President of the Church, called by Joseph Smith, January 24, 1841 – June 27, 1844; Latter Day Saint Apostle, called by Joseph Smith, January 24, 1841 – June 27, 1844; 2nd Presiding Patriarch, called by Joseph Smith, September 14, 1840 – June 27, 1844; Second Counselor in the First Presidency, called by Joseph Smith, November 7, 1837 – January 24, 1841; Assistant Counselor in the First Presidency, called by Joseph Smith, September 3, 1837 – November 7, 1837
Date entered polygamy:	August 11, 1843
Eventual No. of wives:	2
Notes:	Brother of Joseph Smith. Publicly denied practicing polygamy
Name:	Brigham Young
Born:	June 1, 1801
Died:	August 29, 1877 (aged 76)
Positions:	2nd President of the Church of Jesus Christ of Latter-day Saints, December 27, 1847 – August 29, 1877; President of the Quorum of the Twelve Apostles, April 14, 1840 – December 27, 1847; Quorum of the Twelve Apostles, called by Three Witnesses, February 14, 1835 – December 27, 1847; LDS Church Apostle, called by Three Witnesses, February 14, 1835 – August 29, 1877
Date entered polygamy:	April 5, 1841
Eventual No. of wives:	55
Notes:	Succeeded Smith as leader of the LDS Church. Was also Governor of Utah Territory from February 3, 1851, to April 12, 1858. Is probably the most famous Latter Day Saint polygamist with 55 wives.
Name:	Heber C. Kimball
Born:	June 14, 1801
Died:	June 22, 1868 (aged 67)
Positions:	First Counselor in the First Presidency, called by Brigham Young, December 27, 1847 – June 22, 1868; Quorum of the Twelve Apostles, called by Three Witnesses, February 14, 1835 – December 27, 1847; LDS Church Apostle, called by Three Witnesses, February 14, 1835 – June 22, 1868
Date entered polygamy:	1842
Eventual No. of wives:	45
Name:	Willard Richards
Born:	June 24, 1804
Died:	March 11, 1854 (aged 49)
Positions:	Second Counselor in the First Presidency, called by Brigham Young, December 27, 1847 – March 11, 1854; Quorum of the Twelve Apostles, called by Joseph Smith, April 14, 1840 – December 27, 1847; LDS Church Apostle, called by Joseph Smith, April 14, 1840 – March 11, 1854
Date entered polygamy:	January 18, 1843
Eventual No. of wives:	14
Notes:	Richards was incarcerated in Carthage Jail with Joseph Smith, Hyrum Smith and John Taylor on June 27, 1844, when the jail was attacked by a mob and the Smith brothers were murdered.
Name:	William Smith
Born:	March 13, 1811
Died:	November 13, 1893 (aged 82)
Positions:	Petitioner for Patriarchate (RLDS Church), called by Joseph Smith III, April 6, 1872 – November 13, 1893; 3rd Presiding Patriarch (LDS Church), May 24, 1845 – October 6, 1845; Quorum of the Twelve Apostles, May 25, 1839 – October 6, 1845; Quorum of the Twelve Apostles, called by Three Witnesses, February 15, 1835 – May 4, 1839; Latter Day Saint Apostle, called by Joseph Smith, February 15, 1835 – October 6, 1845
Date entered polygamy:	August 1843
Eventual No. of wives:	22
Notes:	Brother of Joseph Smith. Was removed from the Quorum due to apostasy May 4, 1839, but readmitted May 25, 1839. Was then excommunicated for apostasy on October 6, 1845. Followed James J. Strang for a time, then started his own LDS Church in Covington, Kentucky. In later years he joined the RLDS Church (now Community of Christ) and was a petitioner for RLDS Patriarchate from April 1872 to 13 November 1893. Introduced polygamy to the Strangite Mormons. His Church in Covington, Kentucky disintegrated after he introduced spiritual wifery into it. He always denied he and his brother Joseph had ever practiced or taught spiritual wifery or any other form of polygamy
Name:	Thomas Bullock
Born:	December 23, 1816
Died:	February 10, 1885 (aged 68)
Positions:	Reporter and Member of the Council of Fifty, called by Brigham Young, December 25, 1846 – June 24, 1882; Clerk in the Church Historian's Office, called by Joseph Smith, c. 1843
Date entered polygamy:	January 23, 1843
Eventual No. of wives:	3
Notes:	Bullock also was a member of the Council of Fifty and a clerk in the Church Historian's Office.
Name:	Orson Pratt
Born:	September 19, 1811
Died:	October 3, 1881 (aged 70)
Positions:	Quorum of the Twelve Apostles, January 20, 1843 – October 3, 1881; Quorum of the Twelve Apostles, called by Three Witnesses, April 26, 1835 – August 20, 1842; LDS Church Apostle, called by Three Witnesses, April 26, 1835
Date entered polygamy:	March 10, 1843
Eventual No. of wives:	10
Notes:	Younger brother of Parley P. Pratt. Was excommunicated for apostasy Aug 20, 1842, but readmitted Jan 20, 1843. As a result, was given reduced seniority in Jun 1875. Last surviving member of the original Quorum. Under the direction of Brigham Young, he published The Seer. The Seer was a periodical published to defend the LDS Church's practice of polygamy. Despite William Clayton claiming in his journal, first published in 1921, that she had been told of the revelation on polygamy on July 12, 1843, Emma Smith, Joseph Smith's widow, claimed that the very first time she ever became aware of polygamy being attributed to her late husband was 10 years later when she read about it in Pratt's The Seer in 1853.
Name:	William Clayton
Born:	July 17, 1814
Died:	December 4, 1879 (aged 65)
Positions:	Member and Clerk of the Council of Fifty, called by Joseph Smith, March 11, 1844 – December 4, 1879
Date entered polygamy:	April 27, 1843
Eventual No. of wives:	10
Notes:	Credited with inventing a version of the modern odometer. Smith dictated the 1843 revelation on polygamy to Clayton. (See Origin of Latter Day Saint polygamy)
Name:	Orson Hyde
Born:	January 8, 1805
Died:	November 28, 1878 (aged 73)
Positions:	President of the Quorum of the Twelve Apostles, December 27, 1847 – April 10, 1875; Quorum of the Twelve Apostles, June 27, 1839 – November 28, 1878; Quorum of the Twelve Apostles, called by Three Witnesses, February 15, 1835 – May 4, 1839; LDS Church Apostle, called by Three Witnesses, February 15, 1835 – November 28, 1878
Date entered polygamy:	April 1843
Eventual No. of wives:	9
Notes:	Was removed from the Quorum due to apostasy May 4, 1839, but readmitted June 27, 1839. As a result, was given reduced seniority on April 10, 1875. His wife Marinda married Joseph Smith in a polyandrous marriage while Hyde was on a mission to Jerusalem.
Name:	Parley P. Pratt
Born:	April 12, 1807
Died:	May 13, 1857 (aged 50)
Positions:	Quorum of the Twelve Apostles, called by Three Witnesses, February 21, 1835 – May 13, 1857; LDS Church Apostle, called by Three Witnesses, February 21, 1835 – May 13, 1857
Date entered polygamy:	June 24, 1843
Eventual No. of wives:	11
Notes:	In 1857, on a farm northeast of Van Buren, Arkansas, Pratt was murdered by Hector McLean, the legal husband of one of Pratt's plural wives. Pratt is buried near Alma, Arkansas.
Name:	Amasa Lyman
Born:	March 30, 1813
Died:	February 4, 1877 (aged 63)
Positions:	Quorum of the Twelve Apostles, October 6, 1845 – October 6, 1867; Counselor in the First Presidency, called by Joseph Smith, February 4, 1843 – June 27, 1844; Quorum of the Twelve Apostles, called by Joseph Smith, August 20, 1842 – January 20, 1843; Latter Day Saint Apostle, called by Joseph Smith, August 20, 1842 – October 6, 1867
Date entered polygamy:	July 1843
Eventual No. of wives:	9
Notes:	Was temporarily removed from the Quorum of the Twelve due to the re-entry of Orson Pratt on January 20, 1843; Lyman was later readmitted on August 12, 1844. Lyman was excommunicated for apostasy on May 6, 1867.
Name:	John Taylor
Born:	November 1, 1808
Died:	July 25, 1887 (aged 78)
Positions:	3rd President of the Church of Jesus Christ of Latter-day Saints, October 10, 1880 – July 25, 1887; President of the Quorum of the Twelve Apostles, April 10, 1875 – October 10, 1880; Quorum of the Twelve Apostles, called by Joseph Smith, December 19, 1838 – October 10, 1880; LDS Church Apostle, called by Joseph Smith, December 19, 1838 – July 25, 1887
Date entered polygamy:	December 12, 1843
Eventual No. of wives:	9
Notes:	Was promoted to Quorum President when Orson Hyde was given reduced seniority. Had 34 children.
Name:	Edwin D. Woolley, Sr.
Born:	June 28, 1807
Died:	October 12, 1881 (aged 74)
Date entered polygamy:	1843
Eventual No. of wives:	6
Notes:	Woolley was a member of the Utah Territorial Legislature in 1851.
Name:	Erastus Snow
Born:	November 9, 1818
Died:	May 27, 1888 (aged 69)
Positions:	Quorum of the Twelve Apostles, called by Brigham Young, February 12, 1849 – May 27, 1888; LDS Church Apostle, called by Brigham Young, February 12, 1849 – May 27, 1888
Date entered polygamy:	April 2, 1844
Eventual No. of wives:	16
Notes:	Was also a member of the Council of Fifty
Name:	John D. Lee
Born:	September 12, 1812
Died:	March 23, 1877 (aged 64)
Positions:	Member of the Council of Fifty, called by Brigham Young, 1844 – March 23, 1877
Date entered polygamy:	April 19, 1844
Eventual No. of wives:	19
Notes:	Was executed for his role in the Mountain Meadows massacre.
Name:	Ezra T. Benson
Born:	February 22, 1811
Died:	September 3, 1869 (aged 58)
Positions:	Quorum of the Twelve Apostles, called by Brigham Young, July 16, 1846 – September 3, 1869; LDS Church Apostle, called by Brigham Young, July 16, 1846 – September 3, 1869
Date entered polygamy:	April 27, 1844
Eventual No. of wives:	8
Notes:	Great-grandfather of the thirteenth president of LDS church, Ezra Taft Benson

== The Church of Jesus Christ of Latter-day Saints ==
The following members of the LDS Church practiced plural marriage:

=== Presidents of the Church ===
Name:	Heber J. Grant
Born:	November 22, 1856
Died:	May 14, 1945 (aged 88)
Positions:	7th President of the Church of Jesus Christ of Latter-day Saints, November 23, 1918 – May 14, 1945; President of the Quorum of the Twelve Apostles, November 18, 1916 – November 23, 1918; Quorum of the Twelve Apostles, called by John Taylor, October 16, 1882 – November 23, 1918; LDS Church Apostle, called by John Taylor, October 16, 1882 – May 14, 1945
Date entered polygamy:	May 26, 1884
Eventual No. of wives:	3
Notes:	Grant succeeded Joseph F. Smith as president of the LDS Church in November 1918. However, he was not sustained in the position by the general church membership until June 1919, as the influenza pandemic of 1918 forced a delay of the church's traditional springtime general conference. In 1899, Grant pleaded guilty to unlawful cohabitation and was fined $100. During his tenure as president, Grant enforced the 1890 Manifesto outlawing plural marriage. In 1935, Grant excommunicated members of the church in Short Creek, Arizona, that refused to sign the loyalty pledge to the church that included a renunciation of plural marriage.
Name:	Joseph F. Smith
Born:	November 13, 1838
Died:	November 19, 1918 (aged 80)
Positions:	6th President of the Church of Jesus Christ of Latter-day Saints, October 17, 1901 – November 19, 1918; President of the Quorum of the Twelve Apostles, October 10, 1901 – October 17, 1901; First Counselor in the First Presidency, called by Lorenzo Snow, October 6, 1901 – October 10, 1901; Second Counselor in the First Presidency, called by Wilford Woodruff, April 7, 1889 – October 6, 1901; Quorum of the Twelve Apostles, July 25, 1887 – April 7, 1889; Second Counselor in the First Presidency, called by John Taylor, October 10, 1880 – July 25, 1887; Quorum of the Twelve Apostles, August 29, 1877 – October 10, 1880; Counselor in the First Presidency, called by Brigham Young, July 1, 1866 – August 29, 1877; LDS Church Apostle, called by Brigham Young, July 1, 1866 – November 19, 1918
Date entered polygamy:	May 6, 1866
Eventual No. of wives:	6
Notes:	Son of Hyrum Smith, and nephew of Joseph Smith Issued the Second Manifesto in 1904.
Name:	Lorenzo Snow
Born:	April 3, 1814
Died:	October 10, 1901 (aged 87)
Positions:	5th President of the Church of Jesus Christ of Latter-day Saints, September 13, 1898 – October 10, 1901; President of the Quorum of the Twelve Apostles, April 7, 1889 – September 13, 1898; Quorum of the Twelve Apostles, August 29, 1877 – September 13, 1898; Assistant Counselor in the First Presidency, called by Brigham Young, May 9, 1874 – August 29, 1877; Counselor in the First Presidency, called by Brigham Young, June 8, 1873 – May 9, 1874; Quorum of the Twelve Apostles, called by Brigham Young, February 12, 1849 – June 8, 1873; LDS Church Apostle, called by Brigham Young, February 12, 1849 – October 10, 1901
Date entered polygamy:	1845
Eventual No. of wives:	11
Notes:	Brother-in-law of both Joseph Smith and Brigham Young through Eliza R. Snow. Convicted of unlawful cohabitation in 1885 and was imprisoned in 1885 and 1886. Was one of the few Latter-day Saint leaders who ceased cohabiting with his already existing plural wives after the 1890 Manifesto
Name:	John Taylor
Born:	November 1, 1808
Died:	July 25, 1887 (aged 78)
Positions:	3rd President of the Church of Jesus Christ of Latter-day Saints, October 10, 1880 – July 25, 1887; President of the Quorum of the Twelve Apostles, April 10, 1875 – October 10, 1880; Quorum of the Twelve Apostles, called by Joseph Smith, December 19, 1838 – October 10, 1880; LDS Church Apostle, called by Joseph Smith, December 19, 1838 – July 25, 1887
Date entered polygamy:	December 12, 1843
Eventual No. of wives:	9
Notes:	Was promoted to Quorum President when Orson Hyde was given reduced seniority. Had 34 children.
Name:	Wilford Woodruff
Born:	March 1, 1807
Died:	September 2, 1898 (aged 91)
Positions:	4th President of the Church of Jesus Christ of Latter-day Saints, April 7, 1889 – September 2, 1898; President of the Quorum of the Twelve Apostles, October 10, 1880 – April 7, 1889; Quorum of the Twelve Apostles, called by Joseph Smith, April 26, 1839 – April 7, 1889; Apostle, called by Joseph Smith, April 26, 1839 – September 2, 1898
Date entered polygamy:	December 12, 1843
Eventual No. of wives:	9
Notes:	Became Quorum President because Orson Pratt was given reduced seniority. Had 34 children.
Name:	Brigham Young
Born:	June 1, 1801
Died:	August 29, 1877 (aged 76)
Positions:	2nd President of the Church of Jesus Christ of Latter-day Saints, December 27, 1847 – August 29, 1877; President of the Quorum of the Twelve Apostles, April 14, 1840 – December 27, 1847; Quorum of the Twelve Apostles, called by Three Witnesses, February 14, 1835 – December 27, 1847; LDS Church Apostle, called by Three Witnesses, February 14, 1835 – August 29, 1877
Date entered polygamy:	April 5, 1841
Eventual No. of wives:	55
Notes:	Succeeded Smith as leader of the LDS Church. Was also Governor of Utah Territory from February 3, 1851, to April 12, 1858. Is probably the most famous Latter Day Saint polygamist with 55 wives.

=== Members of the First Presidency and Quorum of the Twelve Apostles ===
Name:	Ezra T. Benson
Born:	February 22, 1811
Died:	September 3, 1869 (aged 58)
Positions:	Quorum of the Twelve Apostles, called by Brigham Young, July 16, 1846 – September 3, 1869; LDS Church Apostle, called by Brigham Young, July 16, 1846 – September 3, 1869
Date entered polygamy:	April 27, 1844
Eventual No. of wives:	8
Notes:	Great-grandfather of the thirteenth president of LDS church, Ezra Taft Benson
Name:	Abraham H. Cannon
Born:	March 12, 1859
Died:	July 19, 1896 (aged 37)
Positions:	Quorum of the Twelve Apostles, called by Wilford Woodruff, October 7, 1889 – July 19, 1896; LDS Church Apostle, called by Wilford Woodruff, October 7, 1889 – July 19, 1896; First Seven Presidents of the Seventy, called by John Taylor, October 8, 1882 – October 7, 1889
Date entered polygamy:	Oct 15, 1879
Eventual No. of wives:	3
Notes:	Was a member of the Council of Fifty. Son of apostle George Q. Cannon. Convicted of unlawful cohabitation in 1886 and imprisoned for six months.
Name:	George Q. Cannon
Born:	January 11, 1827
Died:	April 12, 1901 (aged 74)
Positions:	First Counselor in the First Presidency, called by Lorenzo Snow, September 13, 1898 – April 12, 1901; First Counselor in the First Presidency, called by Wilford Woodruff, April 7, 1889 – September 2, 1898; Quorum of the Twelve Apostles, July 25, 1887 – April 7, 1889; First Counselor in the First Presidency, called by John Taylor, October 10, 1880 – July 25, 1887; Quorum of the Twelve Apostles, August 29, 1877 – October 10, 1880; Assistant Counselor in the First Presidency, called by Brigham Young, May 9, 1874 – August 29, 1877; Counselor in the First Presidency, called by Brigham Young, June 8, 1873 – May 9, 1874; Quorum of the Twelve Apostles, called by Brigham Young, August 26, 1860 – June 8, 1873; LDS Church Apostle, called by Brigham Young, August 26, 1860 – April 12, 1901
Date entered polygamy:	October 15, 1879
Eventual No. of wives:	3
Notes:	Convicted of unlawful cohabitation in 1886 and imprisoned for six months.
Name:	Albert Carrington
Born:	January 8, 1813
Died:	September 19, 1889 (aged 76)
Positions:	Quorum of the Twelve Apostles, August 29, 1877 – November 7, 1885; Assistant Counselor in the First Presidency, called by Brigham Young, May 9, 1874 – August 29, 1877; Counselor in the First Presidency, called by Brigham Young, June 8, 1873 – May 9, 1874; Quorum of the Twelve Apostles, called by Brigham Young, July 3, 1870 – June 8, 1873; LDS Church Apostle, called by Brigham Young, July 3, 1870 – November 7, 1885
Date entered polygamy:	c. 1842
Eventual No. of wives:	2
Notes:	Also served as an official Church Historian (1871–1874), as a member of the Council of Fifty and in the Utah Territorial Legislature (1869). Was excommunicated for adultery November 7, 1885, and later rebaptized on November 1, 1887; however, he was not reinstated as an apostle or as a general authority.
Name:	Rudger Clawson
Born:	March 12, 1857
Died:	June 21, 1943 (aged 86)
Positions:	President of the Quorum of the Twelve Apostles, March 17, 1921 – June 21, 1943; Acting President of the Quorum of the Twelve Apostles, November 23, 1918 – March 17, 1921; Quorum of the Twelve Apostles, October 10, 1901 – June 21, 1943; Second Counselor in the First Presidency, called by Lorenzo Snow, October 6, 1901 – October 10, 1901; Quorum of the Twelve Apostles, called by Lorenzo Snow, October 10, 1898 – October 6, 1901; LDS Church Apostle, called by Lorenzo Snow, October 10, 1898 – June 21, 1943
Date entered polygamy:	March 29, 1883
Eventual No. of wives:	3
Notes:	Clawson served in the Quorum of the Twelve for 45 years. The town of Clawson, Utah, is named after him. Clawson was the first person convicted of unlawful cohabitation under the Edmunds Act. He was sentenced to 3½ years imprisonment and fined $1,500.
Name:	Matthias F. Cowley
Born:	August 25, 1858
Died:	June 16, 1940 (aged 81)
Positions:	Quorum of the Twelve Apostles, called by Wilford Woodruff, October 7, 1897 – October 28, 1905; LDS Church Apostle, called by Wilford Woodruff, October 7, 1897 – May 11, 1911
Date entered polygamy:	September 22, 1889
Eventual No. of wives:	3
Notes:	The town of Cowley, Wyoming, is named after him. Cowley resigned from the Quorum October 28, 1905. He remained an ordained apostle of the church until his priesthood was suspended in on May 11, 1911, and later restored on April 3, 1936. Reports of Cowley's continuing involvement in new plural marriages led to his priesthood being suspended, and he continued to be linked with plural marriage over the next several years.
Name:	Jedediah M. Grant
Born:	February 21, 1816
Died:	December 1, 1856 (aged 40)
Positions:	Second Counselor in the First Presidency, called by Brigham Young, April 7, 1854 – December 1, 1856; LDS Church Apostle, called by Brigham Young, April 7, 1854 – December 1, 1856; First Seven Presidents of the Seventy, called by Brigham Young, December 2, 1845 – April 7, 1854
Date entered polygamy:	February 11, 1849
Eventual No. of wives:	7
Notes:	He was known for his fiery speeches during the Reformation of 1856, earning the nickname, "Brigham's Sledgehammer". He was a member of the Council of Fifty and Mayor of Salt Lake City (1851–56). He is the father of Heber J. Grant, who later served as President of the Church.
Name:	Orson Hyde
Born:	January 8, 1805
Died:	November 28, 1878 (aged 73)
Positions:	President of the Quorum of the Twelve Apostles, December 27, 1847 – April 10, 1875; Quorum of the Twelve Apostles, June 27, 1839 – November 28, 1878; Quorum of the Twelve Apostles, called by Three Witnesses, February 15, 1835 – May 4, 1839; LDS Church Apostle, called by Three Witnesses, February 15, 1835 – November 28, 1878
Date entered polygamy:	April 1843
Eventual No. of wives:	9
Notes:	Was removed from the Quorum due to apostasy May 4, 1839, but readmitted June 27, 1839. As a result, was given reduced seniority on April 10, 1875. His wife Marinda married Joseph Smith in a polyandrous marriage while Hyde was on a mission to Jerusalem.
Name:	Heber C. Kimball
Born:	June 14, 1801
Died:	June 22, 1868 (aged 67)
Positions:	First Counselor in the First Presidency, called by Brigham Young, December 27, 1847 – June 22, 1868; Quorum of the Twelve Apostles, called by Three Witnesses, February 14, 1835 – December 27, 1847; LDS Church Apostle, called by Three Witnesses, February 14, 1835 – June 22, 1868
Date entered polygamy:	1842
Eventual No. of wives:	45
Name:	Amasa Lyman
Born:	March 30, 1813
Died:	February 4, 1877 (aged 63)
Positions:	Quorum of the Twelve Apostles, October 6, 1845 – October 6, 1867; Counselor in the First Presidency, called by Joseph Smith, February 4, 1843 – June 27, 1844; Quorum of the Twelve Apostles, called by Joseph Smith, August 20, 1842 – January 20, 1843; Latter Day Saint Apostle, called by Joseph Smith, August 20, 1842 – October 6, 1867
Date entered polygamy:	July 1843
Eventual No. of wives:	9
Notes:	Was temporarily removed from the Quorum of the Twelve due to the re-entry of Orson Pratt on January 20, 1843; Lyman was later readmitted on August 12, 1844. Lyman was excommunicated for apostasy on May 6, 1867.
Name:	Francis M. Lyman
Born:	January 12, 1840
Died:	November 18, 1916 (aged 76)
Positions:	President of the Quorum of the Twelve Apostles, October 6, 1903 – November 18, 1916; Quorum of the Twelve Apostles, called by John Taylor, October 27, 1880 – November 18, 1916; LDS Church Apostle, called by John Taylor, October 27, 1880 – November 18, 1916
Date entered polygamy:	October 4, 1869
Eventual No. of wives:	2
Notes:	Member of the Council of Fifty. Son of Amasa M. Lyman.
Name:	Richard R. Lyman
Born:	November 23, 1870
Died:	December 31, 1963 (aged 93)
Positions:	Quorum of the Twelve Apostles, called by Joseph F. Smith, April 7, 1918 – November 12, 1943; LDS Church Apostle, called by Joseph F. Smith, April 7, 1918 – November 12, 1943
Date entered polygamy:	c. 1925
Eventual No. of wives:	2
Notes:	Son of Francis M. Lyman and grandson of Amasa M. Lyman. In 1925, Lyman had begun what he called a polygamous relationship without the knowledge of his first wife. Lyman was excommunicated on November 12, 1943. The Quorum of the Twelve provided the newspapers with a one-sentence announcement, stating that the ground for excommunication was violation of the law of chastity.
Name:	Marriner W. Merrill
Born:	September 25, 1832
Died:	February 6, 1906 (aged 73)
Positions:	Quorum of the Twelve Apostles, called by Wilford Woodruff, October 7, 1889 – February 6, 1906; LDS Church Apostle, called by Wilford Woodruff, October 7, 1889 – February 6, 1906
Date entered polygamy:	5 June 1856
Eventual No. of wives:	8
Notes:	Merrill was also the Postmaster of Richmond in 1866, a County Selectman from 1872 to 1879 and a member of the territorial legislature for two terms. Merrill married his eighth wife after the 1890 Manifesto announced the discontinuation of polygamy. He is alleged also to have advocated and performed post-Manifesto plural marriages. Merrill was summoned twice as a witness before the Smoot investigation before the United States Congress, but declined citing poor health.
Name:	Charles W. Nibley
Born:	February 5, 1849
Died:	December 11, 1931 (aged 82)
Positions:	Second Counselor in the First Presidency, called by Heber J. Grant, May 28, 1925 – December 11, 1931; Presiding Bishop, called by Joseph F. Smith, December 4, 1907 – May 28, 1925
Date entered polygamy:	30 March 1880
Eventual No. of wives:	3
Notes:	Nibley was also the fifth presiding bishop of the LDS Church between 1907 and 1925. He is one of the few individuals to serve in the First Presidency without having been ordained to the priesthood office of apostle.
Name:	Orson Pratt
Born:	September 19, 1811
Died:	October 3, 1881 (aged 70)
Positions:	Quorum of the Twelve Apostles, January 20, 1843 – October 3, 1881; Quorum of the Twelve Apostles, called by Three Witnesses, April 26, 1835 – August 20, 1842; LDS Church Apostle, called by Three Witnesses, April 26, 1835
Date entered polygamy:	March 10, 1843
Eventual No. of wives:	10
Notes:	Younger brother of Parley P. Pratt. Was excommunicated for apostasy Aug 20, 1842, but readmitted Jan 20, 1843. As a result, was given reduced seniority in Jun 1875. Last surviving member of the original Quorum. Under the direction of Brigham Young, he published The Seer. The Seer was a periodical published to defend the LDS Church's practice of polygamy. Despite William Clayton claiming in his journal, first published in 1921, that she had been told of the revelation on polygamy on July 12, 1843, Emma Smith, Joseph Smith's widow, claimed that the very first time she ever became aware of polygamy being attributed to her late husband was 10 years later when she read about it in Pratt's The Seer in 1853.
Name:	Parley P. Pratt
Born:	April 12, 1807
Died:	May 13, 1857 (aged 50)
Positions:	Quorum of the Twelve Apostles, called by Three Witnesses, February 21, 1835 – May 13, 1857; LDS Church Apostle, called by Three Witnesses, February 21, 1835 – May 13, 1857
Date entered polygamy:	June 24, 1843
Eventual No. of wives:	11
Notes:	In 1857, on a farm northeast of Van Buren, Arkansas, Pratt was murdered by Hector McLean, the legal husband of one of Pratt's plural wives. Pratt is buried near Alma, Arkansas.
Name:	Charles C. Rich
Born:	August 21, 1809
Died:	November 17, 1883 (aged 74)
Positions:	Quorum of the Twelve Apostles, called by Brigham Young, February 12, 1849 – November 17, 1883; LDS Church Apostle, called by Brigham Young, February 12, 1849 – November 17, 1883
Date entered polygamy:	January 6, 1845
Eventual No. of wives:	6
Notes:	Was also a member of the Council of Fifty.
Name:	Franklin D. Richards I
Born:	April 2, 1821
Died:	December 9, 1899 (aged 78)
Positions:	President of the Quorum of the Twelve Apostles, September 13, 1898 – December 9, 1899; Quorum of the Twelve Apostles, called by Brigham Young, February 12, 1849 – December 9, 1899; LDS Church Apostle, called by Brigham Young, February 12, 1849 – December 9, 1899
Date entered polygamy:	October 13, 1849
Eventual No. of wives:	11
Name:	Willard Richards
Born:	June 24, 1804
Died:	March 11, 1854 (aged 49)
Positions:	Second Counselor in the First Presidency, called by Brigham Young, December 27, 1847 – March 11, 1854; Quorum of the Twelve Apostles, called by Joseph Smith, April 14, 1840 – December 27, 1847; LDS Church Apostle, called by Joseph Smith, April 14, 1840 – March 11, 1854
Date entered polygamy:	January 18, 1843
Eventual No. of wives:	14
Notes:	Richards was incarcerated in Carthage Jail with Joseph Smith, Hyrum Smith and John Taylor on June 27, 1844, when the jail was attacked by a mob and the Smith brothers were murdered.
Name:	George A. Smith
Born:	June 26, 1817
Died:	September 1, 1875 (aged 58)
Positions:	First Counselor in the First Presidency, called by Brigham Young, October 7, 1868 – September 1, 1875; Quorum of the Twelve Apostles, called by Joseph Smith, April 26, 1839 – October 7, 1868; LDS Church Apostle, called by Joseph Smith, April 26, 1839 – September 1, 1875
Date entered polygamy:	November 29, 1844
Eventual No. of wives:	7
Notes:	Cousin of Joseph Smith. During The Utah War, Smith visited southern Utah communities, after learning of the imminent arrival of U.S. troops into Utah Territory. Scholars have asserted that Smith's tour, speeches, and personal actions may have contributed to the fear and tension in these communities, which led to the Mountain Meadows massacre. George A. Smith's grandson, George Albert Smith, later became president of the church in 1945.
Name:	John Henry Smith
Born:	September 18, 1848
Died:	October 13, 1911 (aged 63)
Positions:	Second Counselor in the First Presidency, called by Joseph F. Smith, April 7, 1910 – October 13, 1911; Quorum of the Twelve Apostles, called by John Taylor, October 27, 1880 – April 7, 1910; LDS Church Apostle, called by John Taylor, October 27, 1880 – October 13, 1911
Date entered polygamy:	April 4, 1877
Eventual No. of wives:	2
Notes:	Son of George A. Smith. After being elected a member of the Utah Territorial Legislature in 1882, he played an important role in the process whereby Utah made the transition from a territory to a state of the United States.
Name:	John W. Taylor
Born:	May 15, 1858
Died:	October 10, 1916 (aged 58)
Positions:	Quorum of the Twelve Apostles, called by John Taylor, May 15, 1884 – April 1905; LDS Church Apostle, called by John Taylor, May 15, 1884 – March 28, 1911
Date entered polygamy:	September 25, 1888
Eventual No. of wives:	6
Notes:	Son of John Taylor. Resigned from the Quorum in October 1905 and was excommunicated in 1911. Due to his staunch belief in the doctrine of plural marriage, Taylor continued to privately marry additional wives even after the church officially forbade the practice with the 1890 Manifesto. When discovered, Taylor resigned from the Quorum of the Twelve.
Name:	George Teasdale
Born:	December 8, 1831
Died:	June 9, 1907 (aged 75)
Positions:	Quorum of the Twelve Apostles, called by John Taylor, October 16, 1882 – June 9, 1907; LDS Church Apostle, called by John Taylor, October 16, 1882 – June 9, 1907
Date entered polygamy:	
Eventual No. of wives:	9
Notes:	Was also a member of the Council of Fifty.
Name:	Daniel H. Wells
Born:	October 27, 1814
Died:	March 24, 1891 (aged 76)
Positions:	Counselor to the Quorum of the Twelve Apostles, called by John Taylor, October 6, 1877 – March 24, 1891; Second Counselor in First Presidency, called by Brigham Young, January 4, 1857 – August 29, 1877; LDS Church Apostle, called by Brigham Young, January 4, 1857 – March 24, 1891
Date entered polygamy:	February 15, 1849
Eventual No. of wives:	7
Notes:	Wells was a member of the Council of Fifty, Mayor of Salt Lake City (1866–76), president of the Manti Utah Temple (1888–91), and presided over the continuing construction of the Salt Lake Temple as the superintendent of public works for the LDS Church (1848–63). On April 6, 1877, Wells dedicated the St. George Utah Temple.
Name:	John R. Winder
Born:	December 11, 1821
Died:	March 27, 1910 (aged 88)
Positions:	First Counselor in the First Presidency, called by Joseph F. Smith, October 17, 1901 – March 27, 1910; Second Counselor in the Presiding Bishopric, called by William B. Preston, April 8, 1887 – October 17, 1901
Date entered polygamy:	September 30, 1855
Eventual No. of wives:	4
Notes:	Winder was a figure in politics and the militia in the territory. He led the Nauvoo Legion to stop the advance of Johnston's Army in the Utah War of 1857. In the Black Hawk War (Utah), he fought as Adjutant General. Having never been a member of the Quorum of the Twelve Apostles prior to his call to the First Presidency, a rarity, there has been some dispute as to whether or not Winder was ordained an Apostle at the time of his appointment as first counselor. The LDS Church has no record of Winder being ordained to the office of Apostle.
Name:	Abraham O. Woodruff
Born:	November 23, 1872
Died:	June 20, 1904 (aged 31)
Positions:	Quorum of the Twelve Apostles, called by Wilford Woodruff, October 7, 1897 – June 20, 1904; LDS Church Apostle, called by Wilford Woodruff, October 7, 1897 – June 20, 1904
Date entered polygamy:	November 1, 1900
Eventual No. of wives:	2
Notes:	Son of Wilford Woodruff. He was ordained an apostle at the young age of 23, but served less than 8 years due to his death of smallpox. Married his second wife ten years after his father had issued the 1890 Manifesto.
Name:	Brigham Young Jr.
Born:	December 18, 1836
Died:	April 11, 1903 (aged 66)
Positions:	President of the Quorum of the Twelve Apostles, October 17, 1901 – April 11, 1903; Quorum of the Twelve Apostles, August 29, 1877 – April 11, 1903; Assistant Counselor in the First Presidency, called by Brigham Young, May 9, 1874 – August 29, 1877; Counselor in the First Presidency, called by Brigham Young, June 8, 1873 – May 9, 1874; Quorum of the Twelve Apostles, called by Brigham Young, October 9, 1868 – June 8, 1873; LDS Church Apostle, called by Brigham Young, February 4, 1864 – April 11, 1903
Date entered polygamy:	March 15, 1857
Eventual No. of wives:	6
Notes:	Son of Brigham Young. Was ordained an apostle in 1864, but did not become member of the Quorum until 1868. Also served several terms in the Utah Territorial Legislature.
Name:	John Willard Young
Born:	October 1, 1844
Died:	February 12, 1924 (aged 79)
Positions:	Counselor to the Quorum of the Twelve Apostles, called by John Taylor, October 6, 1877 – October 3, 1891; First Counselor in the First Presidency, called by Brigham Young, October 8, 1876 – August 29, 1877; Assistant Counselor in the First Presidency, called by Brigham Young, May 9, 1874 – October 8, 1876; Counselor in the First Presidency, called by Brigham Young, June 8, 1873 – May 9, 1874; LDS Church Apostle, called by Brigham Young, November 22, 1855 – February 12, 1924
Date entered polygamy:	c. 1844
Eventual No. of wives:	6
Notes:	Served as member of the Council of Fifty. In 1888, Joseph F. Smith accused Young of unethically using church funds to maintain a lavish lifestyle. By April 1889, the First Presidency and Quorum of the Twelve Apostles were discussing Young's release. In response, Young resigned from his position on October 3, 1891. For another 33 years, Young remained a church apostle, but never again served as a general authority.

=== Other church general authorities ===
Name:	Titus Billings
Born:	March 25, 1793
Died:	February 6, 1866 (aged 72)
Positions:	Second Counselor to the Bishop of the Church, called by Edward Partridge, August 1, 1837 – May 27, 1840
Date entered polygamy:	January 20, 1854
Eventual No. of wives:	2
Notes:	An early member of the Latter Day Saint movement and a contemporary of both Joseph Smith and Brigham Young. He was one of the first converts to the Church of Jesus Christ of Latter-day Saints. Billings was present at many of the early events of the Latter Day Saint movement, and served as a church leader in Ohio, Missouri and Utah.
Name:	Robert T. Burton
Born:	October 25, 1821
Died:	November 11, 1907 (aged 86)
Positions:	First Counselor in the Presiding Bishopric, called by William B. Preston, October 5, 1884 – November 11, 1907; Second Counselor in the Presiding Bishopric, called by Edward Hunter, October 9, 1874 – October 16, 1883
Date entered polygamy:	February 6, 1856
Eventual No. of wives:	3
Notes:	Member of the presiding bishopric from 1874 until his death. He was also one of the principal officers in the Nauvoo Legion during its Utah reconstitution (including the Utah War) and led the territorial militia against the Morrisites during the 1862 Morrisite War.
Name:	Zebedee Coltrin
Born:	September 7, 1804
Died:	July 21, 1887 (aged 82)
Positions:	First Seven Presidents of the Seventy, called by Joseph Smith, March 1, 1835 – April 6, 1837; Patriarch, called by Brigham Young, May 31, 1873 – July 21, 1887
Date entered polygamy:	February 5, 1843
Eventual No. of wives:	7
Notes:	A Mormon pioneer and a general authority in the Church of Jesus Christ of Latter Day Saints from 1835 to 1837, Coltrin was one of the First Seven Presidents of the Seventy and served in later years as a patriarch in the church, from 1873 until his death. Before he undertook the Mormon practice of polygamy, Zebedee Coltrin's first marriage (1828) to Julia Ann Jennings (1812-1841) was a happy one, but as with the five children Julia ultimately bore him, she also died — at Kirtland, Ohio, at only 29 years of age. Zebedee's second wife, Mary Mott (1820-1886), gave birth to ten more children. She and Zebedee were married 'for time' in 1843, and later, on 20 January 1846, 'sealed for eternity,' in the Nauvoo Temple by Brigham Young — after which, Apostle Parley P. Pratt conferred upon them additional endowment blessings; Mary also stood as proxy that day in the sealing of first wife Julia to their husband. Coltrin married Hannah Husted (1797-1862) and Sarah Oyler (1800-1886) at Nauvoo in 1846, and also Lavinia Elizabeth Fullmer (1838-1907) in 1857 and one Marriet Chaddock in 1874 at Salt Lake City. Finally, noting that none of these additional wives bore him children, it is known that Coltrin found a seventh wife in one Amanda Norwood.
Name:	Levi W. Hancock
Born:	April 7, 1803
Died:	June 10, 1882 (aged 79)
Positions:	First Seven Presidents of the Seventy, called by Joseph Smith, September 3, 1837 – June 10, 1882; First Seven Presidents of the Seventy, called by Joseph Smith, March 1, 1835 – April 6, 1837
Date entered polygamy:	February 24, 1849
Eventual No. of wives:	5
Notes:	Served as member of the Council of Fifty (1846) and the 1st Utah Territorial Legislature. Was honorably released from the First Seven Presidents of the Seventy because he had already been ordained a high priest.
Name:	Leonard W. Hardy
Born:	December 31, 1805
Died:	July 31, 1884 (aged 78)
Positions:	First Counselor in the Presiding Bishopric, called by Edward Hunter, October 6, 1856 – July 31, 1884
Date entered polygamy:	Nov 28, 1850
Eventual No. of wives:	5
Notes:	Served as member of the Council of Fifty.
Name:	George Miller
Born:	November 25, 1794
Died:	August 27, 1856 (aged 61)
Positions:	Second Bishop of the Church, called by Brigham Young, October 7, 1844 – Latter end of 1846
Date entered polygamy:	January 25, 1846
Eventual No. of wives:	3
Notes:	Served as member of the Council of Fifty. Served as member of the Council of Fifty. Disfellowshipped from the church on 3 December 1848 due to his opposition of Brigham Young's leadership, however, he was never formally excommunicated.
Name:	John Hamilton Morgan
Born:	August 8, 1842
Died:	August 14, 1894 (aged 52)
Positions:	First Seven Presidents of the Seventy, called by John Taylor, October 5, 1884 – August 14, 1894
Date entered polygamy:	January 25, 1884
Eventual No. of wives:	3
Notes:	An early educator in Utah Territory
Name:	Isaac Morley
Born:	March 11, 1786
Died:	June 24, 1865 (aged 79)
Positions:	First Counselor to the Bishop of the Church, called by Edward Partridge, June 3, 1831 – May 27, 1840
Date entered polygamy:	1844
Eventual No. of wives:	7
Notes:	Morley was one of the first converts to Smith's Church of Christ. Morley was present at many of the early events of the Latter Day Saint movement, and served as a church leader in Ohio, Missouri, and Utah Territory. Served as a member of the Council of Fifty.
Name:	Stillman Pond
Born:	October 26, 1803
Died:	September 30, 1878 (aged 74)
Positions:	Second Quorum of Seventy, called by Brigham Young, May 17, 1845 – February 16, 1853; Senior President of Thirty-fifth Quorum of Seventy, called by Brigham Young, February 16, 1853 – September 30, 1878
Date entered polygamy:	September 26, 1852
Eventual No. of wives:	5
Notes:	A native Massachusetts farmer, harnessmaker, and land speculator by trade, Pond was a Mormon Pioneer and church leader recognized for the great personal sacrifices he made in the Mormon exodus from Nauvoo, Illinois, to Great Salt Lake Valley (Sept 1846 – Sept 1847), in what would later become Utah Territory. Along the Mormon Trail, Stillman lost to disease and death not only his second wife at Winter Quarters, Nebraska, but also — almost incomprehensibly and in utterly devastating circumstances — 8 children from both his first and second marriages (including 18-year-old Abigail, a plural bride of Presiding Bishop Newell K. Whitney). Having earlier lost also his first wife to a New England Yellow Fever epidemic in 1833 (the 33-year-old mother having borne him 5 children), he went on to enter into three additional unions in Utah Territory from 1852 to 1870. Although Stillman suffered divorce from his fourth wife in 1855, all five women bore him children, making him grand-patriarch to a sea of descendants scattered throughout the intermountain West and beyond: Almyra Whittemore (1800-1833), Maria Louisa Davis (1812-1847), Abigail Thorn (1821–1904), Elizabeth Joan Bessac (1813-1875), and Anna Regina Swenson (1837-1909). Stillman Pond was called and set apart by Brigham Young as Senior President of the 35th Quorum of Seventy, in which capacity he served for 25 years until his death (1853-1878).
Name:	George Reynolds
Born:	January 1, 1842
Died:	August 9, 1909 (aged 67)
Positions:	First Council of the Seventy, called by Wilford Woodruff, April 5, 1890 – August 9, 1909
Date entered polygamy:	August 3, 1874
Eventual No. of wives:	3
Notes:	Was the accused in the U.S. Supreme Court case on polygamy, Reynolds v. United States and was the first convicted Mormon polygamist to serve a term of imprisonment.
Name:	B. H. Roberts
Born:	March 13, 1857
Died:	September 27, 1933 (aged 76)
Positions:	First Council of the Seventy, called by John Taylor, October 7, 1888 – September 27, 1933
Date entered polygamy:	October 2, 1884
Eventual No. of wives:	3
Notes:	Was denied a seat as a member of United States Congress because of his practice of plural marriage. Convicted of unlawful cohabitation in 1899 and imprisoned for six months
Name:	John Smith
Born:	September 22, 1832
Died:	November 6, 1911 (aged 79)
Positions:	5th Presiding Patriarch, called by Brigham Young, February 18, 1855 – November 6, 1911
Date entered polygamy:	February 18, 1857
Eventual No. of wives:	2
Notes:	Nephew of Joseph Smith, Jr. (father was Hyrum Smith).
Name:	John Smith
Born:	July 16, 1781
Died:	May 23, 1854 (aged 72)
Positions:	4th Presiding Patriarch, called by Brigham Young, January 1, 1849 – May 23, 1854; Assistant Counselor in the First Presidency, called by Joseph Smith, September 3, 1837 – June 27, 1844
Date entered polygamy:	1843
Eventual No. of wives:	10
Notes:	Younger brother of Joseph Smith, Sr. and uncle of Joseph Smith. Served as a member of the Council of Fifty, as a counselor in the First Presidency (1837–1844), and as the 4th Presiding Patriarch of the LDS Church (1849–1854). Practiced plural marriage and fathered four children.
Name:	Zerubbabel Snow
Born:	March 29, 1809
Died:	September 27, 1888 (aged 79)
Positions:	First Quorum of the Seventy, 1835 – September 27, 1888
Date entered polygamy:	August 25, 1841
Eventual No. of wives:	3
Notes:	Was elected Attorney General of the Territory of Utah in 1869.
Name:	Edward Stevenson
Born:	May 1, 1820
Died:	January 27, 1897 (aged 76)
Positions:	First Council of the Seventy, October 7, 1894 – January 27, 1897
Date entered polygamy:	October 28, 1855
Eventual No. of wives:	7
Notes:	He is also notable for writing a memoir of Joseph Smith in 1893, which ended up being the earliest surviving documentary source supporting the story of Joseph Smith having taught prior to 1836 that he had seen God and Jesus Christ as two separate beings in his First Vision.
Name:	William W. Taylor
Born:	September 11, 1853
Died:	August 1, 1884 (aged 30)
Positions:	First Seven Presidents of the Seventy, April 7, 1880 – August 1, 1884
Date entered polygamy:	March 29, 1884
Eventual No. of wives:	2
Notes:	Was a member of the Utah Territorial Legislature
Name:	John Van Cott
Born:	September 7, 1814
Died:	February 18, 1883 (aged 68)
Positions:	First Seven Presidents of the Seventy, October 8, 1862 – February 18, 1883
Date entered polygamy:	May 2, 1849
Eventual No. of wives:	5
Notes:	Served as member of the Council of Fifty.
Name:	Newel K. Whitney
Born:	February 5, 1795
Died:	September 24, 1850 (aged 55)
Positions:	Presiding Bishop, June 6, 1847 – September 23, 1850; First Bishop of the Church, October 7, 1844 – June 6, 1847
Date entered polygamy:	February 14, 1845
Eventual No. of wives:	up to 8, including two daughters of Stillman Pond — Elizabeth Almira Pond, age 19; and Abigail A. Pond, age 18.
Notes:	Served as member of the Council of Fifty.
Name:	Joseph Young
Born:	April 7, 1797
Died:	July 16, 1881 (aged 84)
Positions:	First Seven Presidents of the Seventy, March 1, 1835 – July 16, 1881
Date entered polygamy:	January 16, 1846
Eventual No. of wives:	6
Notes:	Was the elder brother of Brigham Young and a member of the Council of Fifty.

=== Other notable members of The Church of Jesus Christ of Latter-day Saints ===
Name:	Milo Andrus
Born:	March 6, 1814
Died:	June 19, 1893 (aged 79)
Date entered polygamy:	January 1, 1848
Eventual No. of wives:	11
Notes:	Andrus was one of the members of Zion's Camp, and helped build the Kirtland, Nauvoo, Salt Lake, and Saint George Temples.
Name:	Gilbert Belnap
Born:	December 22, 1821
Died:	February 26, 1899 (aged 77)
Date entered polygamy:	June 26, 1852
Eventual No. of wives:	2
Notes:	Belnap was a Mormon pioneer, early bishop, missionary, Weber County sheriff, and colonizer. He married first cousins; his first wife was the daughter of Martha McBride Knight, one of Joseph Smith's plural wives. He was issued a recommend in 1857 to take a third wife which was never used.
Name:	John Milton Bernhisel
Born:	June 23, 1799
Died:	September 28, 1881 (aged 82)
Date entered polygamy:	c.1845
Eventual No. of wives:	7
Notes:	Bernhisel was elected as Utah Territory's first delegate to Congress in 1851. Bernhisel married 7 women between 1845 and 1850, however, all but one had deserted him by 1851.
Name:	Anson Call
Born:	May 13, 1810
Died:	August 31, 1890 (aged 80)
Date entered polygamy:	April 15, 1851
Eventual No. of wives:	6
Notes:	Mormon pioneer and an early colonizer of many communities in Utah Territory and surrounding states. Call — who fulfilled many assignments by Brigham Young, including as president of the Bountiful United Order, in a stake presidency, and as a two-time bishop — is perhaps best remembered in Mormon history for recording Joseph Smith's Rocky Mountain prophecy. Call married 6 women between 1833 and 1870, divorcing his second on unfounded rumors of infidelity. Four wives bore him children, while the last two were marriages of protection to the widow of his brother Josiah Call, who was killed by Indians, and of his third wife's widowed sister. Call's plural wives included Mary Flint (1812-1901), Ann Mariah Bowen (1834-1924), Margaretta Unwin Clark (1828-1908), Emma Summers (1828-1912), Henrietta Caroline Williams (1826-1900), and Ann Clark (1817-1893).
Name:	Anson Bowen Call
Born:	October 20, 1863
Died:	January 2, 1958 (aged 94)
Date entered polygamy:	December 10, 1890
Eventual No. of wives:	4
Notes:	Bowen Call (known by all of his associates as 'Bowen' to distinguish him from his father Anson Call) was a Mormon colonizer in Colonia Dublán, Mexico, where he served for more than 40 years as a bishop and patriarch (ordained by President George Albert Smith). Bowen married 4 women between 1885 and 1903, losing all but his first to early death. All bore him children. Bowen was a school teacher in both Utah and Wyoming before migrating to Mexico in 1890 — under prophetic direction, in order to legally enter into the practice of U.S.-banned polygamy — with his first wife and children. Bowen's plural wives included Mary Theresa Thompson (1868-1957), Harriet Cazier (1870-1894), Dora Pratt (1878-1904), and Julia Sarah Abegg (1885-1937). Among the last of the Latter Day Saints to practice plural marriage with the Church's 'blessing' — that is, to enter into a Wilford Woodruff-condoned post-Manifesto polygamous union outside the boundaries of the United States — Bowen Call's descendants now number in the thousands, approximating today 3,500.
Name:	Hugh Findlay
Born:	June 9, 1822
Died:	March 2, 1900 (aged 77)
Date entered polygamy:	c. 1857
Eventual No. of wives:	2
Notes:	Findlay was one of the first two Mormon missionaries to enter India and initiated Mormon missionary work in the Shetland Islands.
Name:	William J. Flake
Born:	July 3, 1839
Died:	August 10, 1932 (aged 93)
Date entered polygamy:	c. 1868
Eventual No. of wives:	2
Notes:	Flake helped settle parts of Arizona. He was convicted of unlawful cohabitation in 1883 and imprisoned for a short time.
Name:	David Fullmer
Born:	July 7, 1803
Died:	October 21, 1879 (aged 76)
Date entered polygamy:	January 21, 1846
Eventual No. of wives:	2
Notes:	David Fullmer was a members of the Council of Fifty and the Nauvoo City Council.
Name:	John S. Fullmer
Born:	July 21, 1807
Died:	October 8, 1883 (aged 76)
Date entered polygamy:	January 21, 1846
Eventual No. of wives:	3
Notes:	John Fullmer was a members of the Council of Fifty and the Utah Territorial House of Representatives.
Name:	Archibald Gardner
Born:	September 2, 1814
Died:	February 8, 1902 (aged 87)
Date entered polygamy:	April 19, 1849
Eventual No. of wives:	11
Notes:	Prominent business man and bishop for 32 years
Name:	Ephraim Hanks
Born:	March 21, 1826
Died:	June 9, 1896 (aged 70)
Date entered polygamy:	March 27, 1856
Eventual No. of wives:	4
Notes:	Hanks was a prominent member of the 19th-century Latter Day Saint movement, a Mormon pioneer and a leader in the early settlement of Utah. Hanks played a role in the rescue of the Martin handcart company, although he wasn't present during the famous Sweetwater crossing. Hanks also led a militia company in scouting expeditions during the Utah War in 1857 and 1858.
Name:	Abraham Hoagland
Born:	March 24, 1797
Died:	February 14, 1872 (aged 74)
Date entered polygamy:	c. 1847
Eventual No. of wives:	4
Notes:	Hoagland was an early Mormon leader, pioneer, and one of the founders of Royal Oak, Michigan, and Salt Lake City, Utah, USA.
Name:	Jacob Hamblin
Born:	April 2, 1819
Died:	August 31, 1886 (aged 67)
Date entered polygamy:	September 30, 1849
Eventual No. of wives:	2
Notes:	Hamblin was a Western pioneer, Mormon missionary, and diplomat to various Native American Tribes of the Southwest and Great Basin.
Name:	John Lyon
Born:	March 4, 1803
Died:	November 28, 1889 (aged 86)
Date entered polygamy:	March 28, 1856
Eventual No. of wives:	2
Notes:	Lyon was a Scottish Latter Day Saint poet and hymn writer.
Name:	Charles S. Peterson
Born:	July 28, 1818
Died:	September 26, 1889 (aged 71)
Date entered polygamy:	c. 1849
Eventual No. of wives:	4
Notes:	Peterson was the first settler of Utah's Morgan Valley, a member of the Utah Territorial Legislature, and one of the first settlers in the Mormon colonies in Mexico.
Name:	Miles Park Romney
Born:	August 18, 1843
Died:	February 26, 1904 (aged 60)
Date entered polygamy:	1867
Eventual No. of wives:	5
Name:	Lot Smith
Born:	March 15, 1830
Died:	June 21, 1892 (aged 62)
Date entered polygamy:	c. 1851
Eventual No. of wives:	8
Notes:	Lot was an officer in the Nauvoo Legion. He was sent on a special mission by Young to delay the United States Army from reaching Utah in 1857.
Name:	Orson Spencer
Born:	March 14, 1802
Died:	October 15, 1855 (aged 53)
Date entered polygamy:	c. 1835
Eventual No. of wives:	6
Notes:	Spencer was a member of the Council of Fifty and was named the first chancellor of the University of Deseret in 1850.
Name:	David K. Udall
Born:	September 7, 1851
Died:	February 18, 1938 (aged 86)
Date entered polygamy:	c. 1882
Eventual No. of wives:	3
Notes:	Udall married last wife in 1903, 13 years after the 1890 Manifesto

== Other sects within the Latter Day Saint movement ==
=== Mormon fundamentalists sects ===
The following are notable members of the Mormon fundamentalist movement who have practiced plural marriage:

Name:	Owen A. Allred
Born:	January 14, 1914
Died:	February 14, 2005 (aged 91)
Date entered polygamy:	1942
Eventual No. of wives:	8
Notes:	Owen Allred became leader of the Apostolic United Brethren following the murder of his brother Rulon Allred.
Name:	Rulon C. Allred
Born:	March 29, 1906
Died:	May 10, 1977 (aged 71)
Date entered polygamy:	c. 1926
Eventual No. of wives:	at least 12
Notes:	Leader of the Apostolic United Brethren. On May 10, 1977, Allred was shot and killed by two women in his office in Murray, Utah. One of the women was later identified as Rena Chynoweth, one of Ervil LeBaron's wives. Although acquitted of the charges, Chynoweth later confessed to the crime in her memoir, The Blood Covenant.
Name:	John Y. Barlow
Born:	March 4, 1874
Died:	December 29, 1949 (aged 75)
Date entered polygamy:	1902
Eventual No. of wives:	4
Notes:	While serving as a missionary for the Church of Jesus Christ of Latter-day Saints, Barlow defended his polygamous views and was dishonorably released. Later, LDS Church apostle Melvin J. Ballard, the president of the Northwest States Mission during Barlow's service there, served as witness in the disciplinary council that resulted in Barlow's excommunication.
Name:	J. Leslie Broadbent
Born:	June 3, 1891
Died:	March 16, 1935 (aged 43)
Date entered polygamy:	June 1915
Eventual No. of wives:	4
Notes:	In 1927, Broadbent published a pamphlet Celestial Marriage advocating the practice of plural marriage. This was one of the first Mormon fundamentalist tracts and was a factor in his subsequent excommunication by the LDS Church in July 1929.
Name:	Tom Green
Born:	June 9, 1948
Died:	February 28, 2021 (aged 72)
Date entered polygamy:	1980s
Eventual No. of wives:	7
Notes:	Green and his lifestyle were the subject of the British-made documentary One Man, Six Wives and Twenty-Nine Children. He and his wives have appeared on various television programmes and have a higher level of media exposure than many other contemporary polygamists.
Name:	James D. Harmston
Born:	November 6, 1940
Died:	June 27, 2013 (aged 72)
Date entered polygamy:	c. 1990
Eventual No. of wives:	at least 8
Notes:	Raised in The Church of Jesus Christ of Latter-day Saints, James D. Harmston and his wife broke away from the Church in the 1980s and founded the True and Living Church of Jesus Christ of Saints of the Last Days.
Name:	Rulon Jeffs
Born:	December 6, 1909
Died:	September 8, 2002 (aged 92)
Date entered polygamy:	March 2, 1909
Eventual No. of wives:	As many as 75
Notes:	Rulon Jeffs was a leader of the Fundamentalist Church of Jesus Christ of Latter Day Saints. It was reported that at the time of Jeffs' death at age 92 that he may have had as many as 75 wives and 65 children; however, conflicting sources indicate that Jeffs may have been survived by 19 or 20 wives and "about 60 children," including 33 sons.
Name:	Warren Jeffs
Born:	December 3, 1955 (age 70)
Date entered polygamy:	
Eventual No. of wives:	78
Notes:	Current leader of the Fundamentalist Church of Jesus Christ of Latter Day Saints. On September 25, 2007, Jeffs was found guilty of two counts of rape as an accomplice and was sentenced to imprisonment for 10 years to life. However, on July 27, 2010, his conviction was reversed by Utah's Supreme Court because of incorrect jury instructions. Subsequently on August 9, 2011, Jeffs was tried on two other counts of sexual assault of a child, convicted and sentenced to life in prison plus 20 years.
Name:	Leroy S. Johnson
Born:	June 12, 1888
Died:	November 25, 1986 (aged 98)
Positions:	Senior Member of the Priesthood Council (Short Creek Community), 1954 – November 25, 1986
Date entered polygamy:	c. 1928
Eventual No. of wives:	6
Notes:	Leader of the Fundamentalist Church of Jesus Christ of Latter Day Saints. Johnson became acquainted with fundamentalist ideas in 1928 after his brother Price introduced him to John Woolley in Centerville, Utah.
Name:	Alex Joseph
Born:	June 24, 1936
Died:	September 27, 1998 (aged 62)
Date entered polygamy:	c. 1969
Eventual No. of wives:	up to 20
Notes:	Founder of the Confederate Nations of Israel and mayor of Big Water, Utah. Joseph was the first Libertarian mayor of a community in the United States.
Name:	C. Elden Kingston
Born:	October 10, 1909
Died:	July 8, 1948 (aged 38)
Date entered polygamy:	1934
Eventual No. of wives:	5
Notes:	Kingston co-founded the Latter Day Church of Christ, also known as the Davis County Cooperative Society.
Name:	Paul E. Kingston
Born:	December 17, 1959 (age 66)
Date entered polygamy:	1978
Eventual No. of wives:	27
Notes:	Prophet and Presiding Priesthood Leader of the Latter Day Church of Christ, also known as the Davis County Cooperative Society, since August 25, 1987.
Name:	Ervil LeBaron
Born:	February 22, 1925
Died:	August 16, 1981 (aged 56)
Date entered polygamy:	c. 1944
Eventual No. of wives:	at least 13 wives
Notes:	Founder of the Church of the Lamb of God and using the religious doctrine of blood atonement as justification, ordered the killings of many of his opponents, including Rulon C. Allred. In 1980, he was sentenced to prison for orchestrating the murder of an opponent, and died in prison.
Name:	Joel LeBaron
Born:	June 9, 1923
Died:	August 20, 1972 (aged 49)
Date entered polygamy:	c. 1944
Eventual No. of wives:	
Notes:	In 1955, Joel LeBaron and two of his brothers established the Church of the Firstborn of the Fulness of Times in Salt Lake City, Utah, with Joel as President of the Church. In 1967, Joel's brother, Ervil LeBaron, was removed from leadership in the church when he began to preach that he, and not Joel, was the proper leader of the church. Then on 20 August 1972 Daniel Jordan, one of Ervil's followers, shot and killed Joel.
Name:	Joseph W. Musser
Born:	March 8, 1872
Died:	March 29, 1954 (aged 82)
Date entered polygamy:	March 1902
Eventual No. of wives:	5
Notes:	Musser is known for his Mormon fundamentalist books, pamphlets and magazines, as well as being considered a prophet by many Mormon fundamentalists.
Name:	John W. Woolley
Born:	December 30, 1831
Died:	December 13, 1928 (aged 96)
Positions:	Senior Member of the Priesthood Council, before 1935 – December 13, 1928
Date entered polygamy:	March 20, 1851
Eventual No. of wives:	3
Notes:	Woolley was sealed to only one woman during his lifetime, and experienced plural marriage for only six years between 1886 and 1892. However, Woolley is known as the father of Mormon fundamentalism and amongst most fundamentalists is considered an apostle, prophet, and president of the priesthood.
Name:	Lorin C. Woolley
Born:	October 23, 1856
Died:	September 19, 1934 (aged 77)
Positions:	Senior Member of the Priesthood Council, December 13, 1928 – September 19, 1934
Date entered polygamy:	by 1915
Eventual No. of wives:	at least 4
Notes:	In 1912, Woolley gave the first written account of the background to the 1886 Revelation and of a subsequent meeting in which Taylor stated that plural marriage must and would continue. It is estimated that up to ninety percent of polygamists across the Wasatch Front today trace their sealing authority through this priesthood line.
Name:	Charles Zitting
Born:	March 30, 1884
Died:	July 14, 1954 (aged 70)
Date entered polygamy:	pre. April 1, 1931
Eventual No. of wives:	5
Notes:	Zitting was a Mormon fundamentalist leader and member of The Council of Friends, in the Short Creek community.
Name:	Brian David Mitchell
Born:	October 18, 1953 (age 73)
Date entered polygamy:	June 5, 2002
Eventual No. of wives:	2 (see note)
Notes:	Mitchell married three times legally, two of the marriages ending in divorce. Elizabeth Smart was kidnapped and forcibly "married" to him, while he was legally married to his third wife Wanda Barzee.

=== Other Latter Day Saint sects ===
Name:	James J. Strang
Born:	March 21, 1813
Died:	July 9, 1856 (aged 43)
Positions:	Founder of the Church of Jesus Christ of Latter Day Saints (Strangite), ca. June 1844 – July 9, 1856
Date entered polygamy:	July 13, 1849
Eventual No. of wives:	5
Notes:	Originally, Strang was strenuously opposed to the practice of polygamy; however, in 1849, Strang reversed course and become one of its strongest advocates. Since many of his early disciples had looked to him as a monogamous counterweight to Brigham Young's polygamous version of Mormonism, Strang's decision to embrace plural marriage proved costly to him and his church.

== See also ==
- List of Brigham Young's wives
- List of Joseph Smith's wives
