= Anson Call =

American politician (1810–1890)

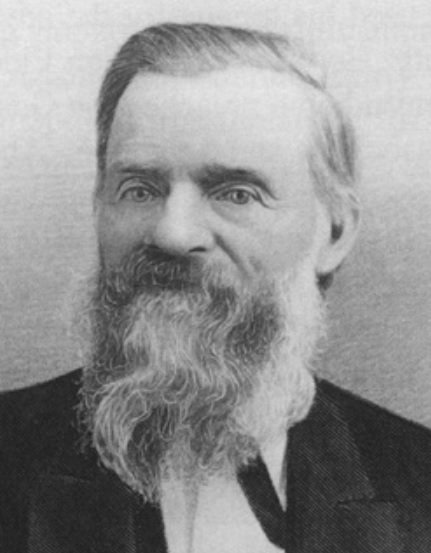
Mormon colonizer of the intermountain West, Anson Call

Anson Call (May 13, 1810 – August 31, 1890) was a Mormon pioneer and an early colonizer of many communities in Utah Territory and surrounding states, perhaps best remembered in Mormon history for recording Joseph Smith's Rocky Mountain prophecy. He was the father of LDS Mexican colonizer and Mormon bishop and patriarch Anson Bowen Call (1863–1958).

== Biography ==
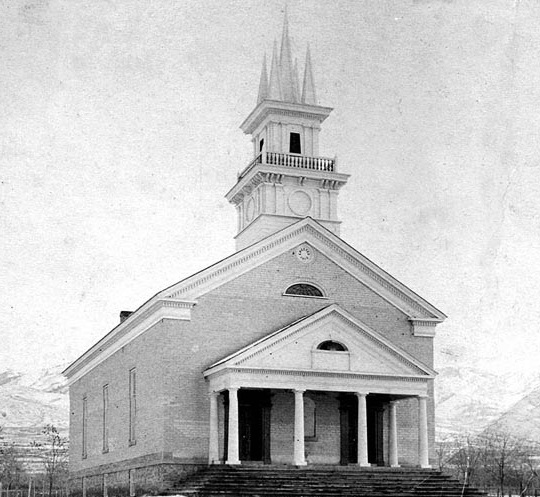
Commissioned in 1857 by President Brigham Young, the Bountiful Tabernacle was completed and dedicated in 1862-63 — the year of Bowen Call's birth, at the height of the American Civil War. After the Johnston's Army episode of the Utah War, President Young called Anson Call to raise funds for and to oversee the completion of the building (but to make the planned date for dedication, Anson paid final construction debts from his personal finance). During its two-day dedication by President Heber C. Kimball, with President Young presiding (14–15 March), the Calls housed and fed 150 out-of-town guests and cared for 100 of the visitors' horses at their residence. Apostle Lorenzo Snow had dedicated the structural site six years earlier on 11 February 1857.

Born at Fletcher, Vermont, Anson Call was baptized a member of the Church of Jesus Christ of Latter-day Saints in 1836. His father Cyril Call (1785–1873) had previously joined the LDS Church in Madison, Ohio. Call initially resisted the preaching of LDS missionaries, but, after reading the Book of Mormon and comparing it to the Bible, was convinced to join the LDS Church. Among the missionaries who taught Call while he resided in Madison were Brigham Young, John P. Greene and Almon Babbitt. Call traveled to Kirtland to be baptized.

Call remained in Kirtland until 1838 when he relocated to Caldwell County, Missouri, settling in the Three Forks of the Grand River Area. After a few months there he relocated to Adam-ondi-Ahman, Missouri. He later returned to the Three Forks area where he was assaulted by the man who had taken over his farm. In February 1839 Call moved to Illinois, first living in the vicinity of Warsaw, Illinois and then in Ramus, Illinois. He moved to Nauvoo, Illinois in 1842.

Anson witnessed, on 8 August 1844 during the Mormon succession crisis, the 'mantle' of the Prophet Joseph Smith fall upon his successor, Brigham Young. He recorded the event and spiritual manifestation in his journal. It had been in 1837 that Anson, who himself later suffered severe mob violence in Missouri, secured the release of the Prophet Joseph from a Kirtland jail by posting a $500 bond. And it was Anson who, at the Prophet's bidding, raced 80 miles to Knoxville on 17 June 1844 to secure by letter the aid of Judge Thomas on behalf of a mob-threatened Nauvoo. When, only a few days after its infamous martyrdom, Carthage Jail was visited by Call, a grieving Anson told its 'gaoler' that he desired that the stained blood upon the floors and doors 'remain as an everlasting testimony against the murderers.'

Call, who would ultimately go on to receive with his four wives Mormonism's sacred Second Anointing ordinance on 5 March 1867, reported that three days after the martyrdom of the Smith brothers, in the dreams of the night he beheld the Prophet Joseph in visional discourse to the Saints, wherein he declared:

Brethren, I have been killed in Carthage jail, and it will not make any difference with you, if you do as you are told. I shall continue to govern and control this kingdom as I have hitherto done. The keys of this kingdom were committed to me. I hold them and shall continue to hold them, worlds without end. I am dead, and I am out of the power of my enemies. I am now where I can do you good. Be no longer troubled. Be faithful, be diligent, do as you are told, and you shall see the salvation of God.

In May 1846 Call sold his farm in Nauvoo, and, along with his first wife, the former Mary Flint, headed west. In 1848, he crossed the plains as a Mormon pioneer. He settled in Bountiful, Utah Territory, where he served as a bishop, beginning in 1850 and established a homestead a half mile north of "Session's Settlement". Later that fall, Call was sent to Parowan, Utah, returning in the spring of 1851 to Bountiful.

That same year, Call led the first company of Latter-day Saints to settle at Fillmore, Utah Territory. While in Fillmore, Call served as the member of the Utah Territorial Legislature from Millard County. In 1854, Call returned to Bountiful where he stayed until 1855 and built a permanent dwelling now known as the Anson Call House which is still standing today. Later in 1855, he founded Call's Fort at Brigham Young's request in what is now Harper Ward, Utah.

Taking charge of 13 teams and drivers in October–November 1856, Call heroically responded to President Young's urgent call to go rescue the stranded Martin-Willie handcart companies, en route to Salt Lake, that had become trapped in early snows somewhere on the Sweetwater River. Among those whom he and others rescued were English immigrants Margaretta Unwin and Emma Summers, whom Call later wedded in February 1857, at the suggestion of President Young.

Other areas of the West that Call helped to colonize were Iron County, Utah and Carson Valley in Arizona Territory (now part of Nevada). In 1864, Call led a party that established a place called Callville, also in Arizona Territory, situated along the Colorado River about 25 miles east of Las Vegas. The site is now under Lake Mead.

While some have said Call also helped to colonize Tooele County, Utah, that assertion seems to be somewhat 'factually enhanced' by enthusiastic descendants. More plausibly, he helped to gather firewood in a canyon near Tooele with his brother Josiah, who did help to settle Tooele. No actual settling there is mentioned in Anson's 1854 personal journal nor in his biography.

In Mormon history, Call — who served in various callings including as President of the Bountiful United Order, in a stake presidency and as a two-time bishop — is perhaps most famous for recording Joseph Smith's Rocky Mountain prophecy of 1842. At the completion of the Bountiful Tabernacle, Brigham Young and “150 persons and 100 horses" were hosted at the Anson Call residence in Bountiful in the days surrounding the festivities.

Call was also among those who quarried stone for the building of the Nauvoo Temple, and was also one of its guards. And later, he was among that elite group of leading priesthood holders (nine in all, including Anson, Lorenzo Snow and his sister Eliza) who were sent by President Young in 1872 to rededicate the Holy Land for the return of the Jews. But because President George A. Smith discovered in London that he lacked sufficient funds to complete the journey, Anson stepped forward with his own $800, opting to stay behind in England, Scotland, Ireland and Wales (visiting church conferences), so that President Smith might continue on to participate in the solemn dedicatory services at Jerusalem's Mount Olivet. Anson never issued complaint for that personal loss of sacred experience and money (which, in fact, he insisted that President Smith never repay him), going even further during his 5-month stay in the British Isles by providing funds for nine Saints in England to immigrate to Utah.

'One of the great frontiersmen of Mormondom' — such was historian Juanita Brooks' assessment of Anson Call. Despite the wide range of settlements in the intermountain West which Call helped to found, he maintained as his primary residence at Bountiful UT, where he died peacefully in 1890, at eighty years of age.

== Marriages ==
=== Mary Flint ===
Anson married Mary Flint on 3 October 1833. They had six biological children (three of which lived to adulthood) and adopted two Native American children. She died on October 8, 1901.

=== Ann Mariah Bowen ===
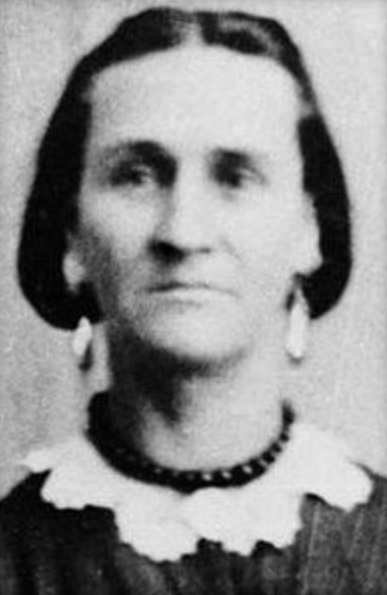
Mormon colonizer of the intermountain West, Mariah Bowen Call

Ann Mariah Bowen (1834–1924), Call's second wife, was born at Bethany, Genesee County, New York, the fifth of nine children born to Israel Bowen (1802–1847) and Charlotte Louisa Durham (1807–1884). The Prophet Joseph Smith was acquainted with little Mariah in Nauvoo IL before her baptism in the Mississippi River at age 8. He had held her on his lap and had called her 'his little black eyed girl.' On the Mormon trek west as part of the Samuel Gully-Orson Spencer wagon train, fifteen-year-old Mariah gained a reputation as 'a first rate wagon master,' handling the teams and driving the entire distance on her own.

Asked by President Brigham Young to help settle and colonize the area of southern Utah called Parowan, and (before this 'restoration' church's controversial Old Testament doctrinal practice was formally declared to the world) to enter into plural marriage by taking a second wife, 40-year-old Anson Call faithfully complied. During the April 1851 General Conference, President Young, looking out over the congregation, saw slender, attractive 17-year-old Ann Mariah Bowen of Centerville, and 'recognized a good match' (it had only been 18 months since Mariah's arrival in the Salt Lake Valley). The two were afterwards introduced in President Young's Salt Lake City office, where he later married them on 15 April 1851.

The couple ultimately had six children, 1852–1866 — born at Fillmore, Call's Fort, Provo, and Bountiful UT — but they suddenly divorced in 1867. Although not much is known about the circumstances of that separation, it was apparently the result of a tragic misunderstanding between the two, its details as they have come down through family reminiscence remaining both cloudy and contradictory.

As for Mariah's relationship with first wife Mary, they forged an unbreakable bond of love for one another like a true mother and daughter But it was upon Mariah's 1857 return to Bountiful (driving her cattle herd over 400 miles of desert) from her settlement efforts in Carson Valley, as she was suddenly introduced to Anson's two new British-immigrant wives, that the initial contrasts must have appeared stark:

Beyond their shared familiarity with hardship, the similarities [between Anson Call's wives] seem to have been few. Both Margaretta and Emma gladly settled into the domestic life of housework, cooking, spinning, knitting, etc., and looked forward to having children of their own. And then into their midst came this energetic, sun-browned young woman who, at twenty-three years of age, already had six years of colonizing experience in primitive conditions, living in wickiups and tents, able to drive a wagon, ride and rope and herd cattle, and shoot as well as most men, in the meantime bearing and nurturing three small children.

Mariah, who lived to the age of 90, was buried alongside Anson Call and his other wives in the Bountiful City Cemetery. An important 'end note' is that near his death, Anson had admitted to his caretaker-son Israel (Bowen's older brother, Mariah's eldest son) that Mariah and her children had been treated unjustly in the divorcement, in his taking custody of her children from her, and requiring her to begin her long forced 'exile' with her mother Louisa in Springville.

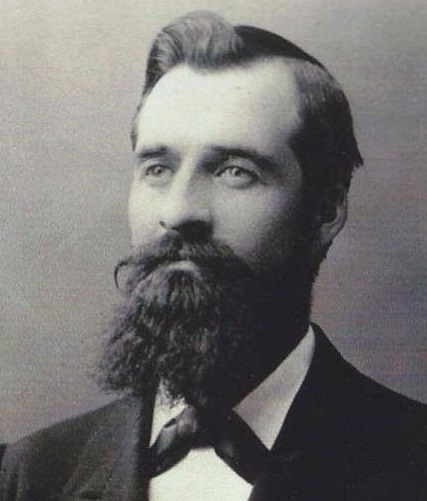
Colonizer of the Mormon colonies in Mexico, Bishop Bowen Call

Mariah Bowen Call, alongside her husband Anson, had been a determined, effective latter-day colonizer of the intermountain West. Beyond Call's Fort, Bountiful, Parowan and St. George, she helped to colonize Carson City and Callville in Arizona Territory (now part of Nevada), and also Fillmore, Utah, where she served as the town's first postmaster. Her son, Anson Bowen Call (1863–1958), who went by the name of 'Bowen' (to distinguish him from his father), was also a Mormon colonizer in Colonia Dublán, Mexico, where he served for more than 40 years as a bishop and patriarch (ordained by President George Albert Smith). In his youth he had been raised in Bountiful and, just as his father had done for the Nauvoo Temple, helped in the stonemasonry labors of the Salt Lake Temple. Bowen was tutored by B. H. Roberts, attended the University of Deseret (now the University of Utah), and became a school teacher in Davis County and Star Valley, Wyoming. And all of this before continuing on to Mexico in 1890 — under prophetic direction, in order to legally enter into the practice of U.S.-banned polygamy — with his wife (to whom he was sealed in 1885 by Apostle and Temple President Marriner W. Merrill in the new Logan Temple) and children.

In Colonia Dublán he saw his people through the dangerous years of the Mexican Revolution, calling upon his priesthood power to rebuke a group of armed Mexican rebels intent on physically harming his family and friends. Bowen further called down rain from the heavens to save his people from drought, forgave a Mexican who brutally murdered two of his sons, and was himself miraculously saved from a rebel firing squad.

Bowen Call married four times as one of the last Latter-Day Saints to practice plural marriage with church sanction. Living to the age of 94, his lifespan spanned the administrations of 19 Presidents of the United States, from Abraham Lincoln to Dwight D. Eisenhower, and 8 Presidents of the LDS Church, from Brigham Young to David O. McKay. His church service included a mission to the British Isles from 1895 to 97, and in 1938 he received an Apostolic promise that his 'calling and election' was sure. Call devoted his life to the LDS church and his descendants now number approximately 3,500.

=== Margaretta Unwin Clark ===
At age 46, Anson married handcart pioneer and British immigrant Margaretta Unwin Clark. The ceremony was performed on February 2, 1857, in Salt Lake City where they were sealed in Brigham Young's office. Margaretta was 31 years old. Together, they had six children.

=== Emma Summers ===
At age 46, Anson married handcart pioneer and British immigrant Emma Summers. Their wedding was intended to be a double wedding with Margaretta Unwin Clark, but illness delayed the marriage. The ceremony was performed on February 24, 1857, in Salt Lake City. They were sealed by Brigham Young. Emma was 29 years old. Together, they had five children, including Lucy — 60-year-old Anson's lastborn child.

=== Later marriages ===
Call married also, later in life, women who bore him no children. These were his Indian-killed brother Josiah's widow, Henrietta Caroline Williams (in 1861, when Anson was 50), and third wife Margaretta's widowed sister, Ann Clark (in 1870, when he was 59).
