= Church of Jesus Christ in Solemn Assembly =

Mormon fundamentalist sect

The Church of Jesus Christ in Solemn Assembly is a Mormon fundamentalist sect headquartered in Big Water, Kane County, southern Utah. It was founded in 1974 by Alex Joseph.

== Establishment ==
The Church of Jesus Christ in Solemn Assembly was formed in 1974 by Alex Joseph after he left the Apostolic United Brethren, a sect he joined after being excommunicated by the Church of Jesus Christ of Latter-day Saints (LDS Church) in 1970.

Joseph established his sect in Cottonwood Canyon, northeast of Kanab in southern Utah. However, the Kane County Sheriff informed Joseph that he was on public land and the sect was evicted. The sect then moved to an area called "Bac Bon", located 16 miles away. Joseph was again forced to move the sect again after the Bac Bon subdevelopment was not approved and building permits had not been granted to Glen Canyon City. Glen Canyon City was later incorporated as Big Water, Utah.

== Confederate Nations of Israel ==
The Confederate Nations of Israel is a hybrid church–political organization with roots in the Church of Jesus Christ in Solemn Assembly and in Mormon fundamentalism. It was organized in 1977 by Joseph and was patterned after the Council of Fifty. The Confederate Nations of Israel is multi-denominational and combines ecumenical spiritual doctrines with ultimate aspirations of quasi-theocratic political control.

While is often classified as a sect within the Latter Day Saint movement the Confederate Nations of Israel is a loosely organized confederation of individuals affiliated from many denominations who may or may not practice plural marriage.

Of the 400 members of the Confederate Nations of Israel members, approximately one-fourth practice polygamy, and very few of these individuals have ever been a member of any Latter Day Saint denomination. In addition to independent Mormon fundamentalists, the organization includes "Catholics, Protestants, Eastern religionists, atheists, and sexually-active homosexuals".

Willy Marshall, a member of the organization, was elected mayor of Big Water in 2001 and became the first openly gay mayor in Utah history.

== Death of Alex Joseph ==
After Alex Joseph died in 1998, polygamy practically ceased to exist within Big Water, Utah. The sect's children attend public school and women were encouraged to live freely and obtain an education. The Joseph family tended to be involved with the media and speak openly about their polygamous lifestyle because they felt the media provided protection for the group.

== See also ==
- Council of Fifty
- Factional breakdown: Mormon fundamentalist sects
- List of Mormon fundamentalist sects
- List of Mormon fundamentalist leaders
