= Augustus Farnham =

American architect

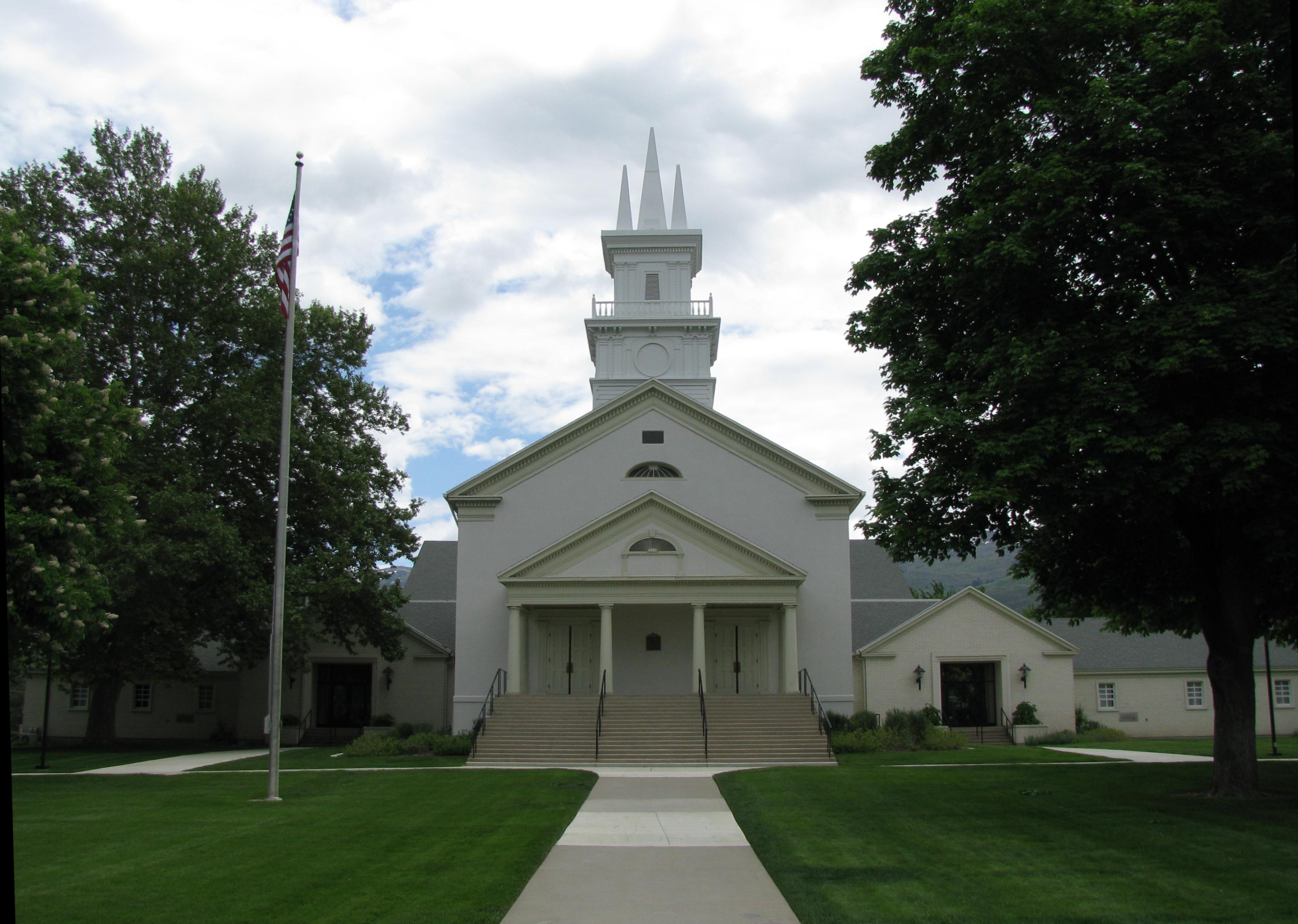
Bountiful Tabernacle

Augustus Alwin Farnham (20 May 1805 – 2 May 1865) was an architect in Utah and a Mormon missionary.

Farnham was born May 20, 1805, in Andover, Massachusetts. In 1843, Farnham converted to Mormonism. In 1845, he was ordained a Seventy and was called to a mission in Australia, arriving in Sydney in 1851. From 1853 to May 1856, he was the president of the mission In October 1854, Farnham, William Cooke, and Thomas Holder traveled to Auckland and became the first missionaries of the Church of Jesus Christ of Latter-day Saints in New Zealand. The three preached in Auckland, Wellington, and Nelson, after which Farnham returned to Australia, leaving Cooke and Holder to continue preaching.

Farnham's most important architectural work was the Bountiful Tabernacle, a Greek Revival monument, which was known worldwide. This building, located at Main and Center Streets in Bountiful, Utah, is listed on the U.S. National Register of Historic Places.
