= Anson Call House =

Historic house in Bountiful, Utah

Coordinates: 40°54′05″N 111°53′09″W

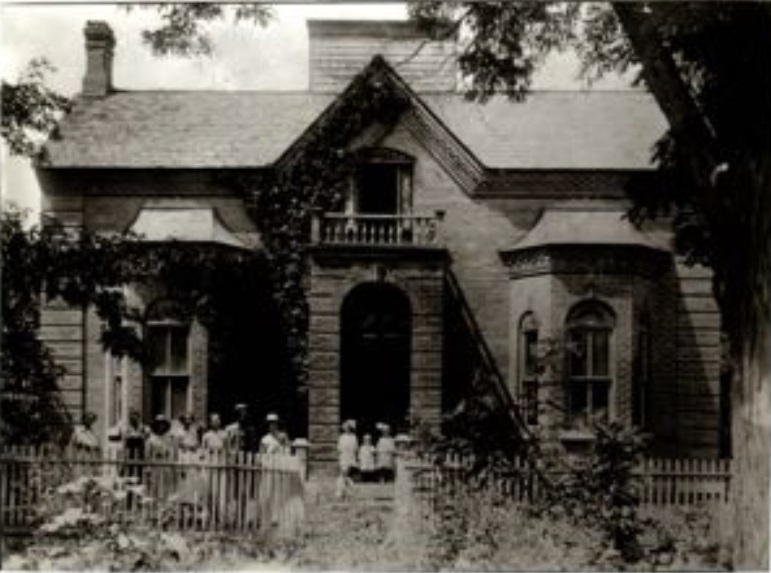
Front of Anson Call home showing picket fence and old enclosed brick entrance and balcony

The Anson Call House was built by Mormon pioneer Anson Call in the early years of Bountiful City in what was then referred to as Session's Settlement, or North Canyon. The Call family set up their homestead in September 1848, one year after Bountiful City founder Perrigrine Sessions had arrived in September 1847. Anson Call began construction on the original one-room stone cabin in 1855. Two main additions were added to the house with the final sandstone brick structure being completed sometime around 1859. The Anson Call House has become a landmark in the history of Bountiful City, Utah as well as early Mormon Pioneer history.

== The Anson Call House & Estate ==
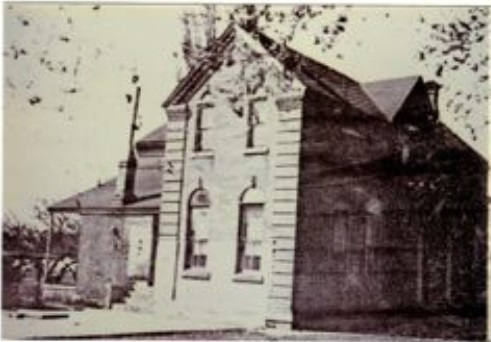
Anson Call House, showing southeast corner. Original cabin is evident behind the main brick structure, with original fireplace chimney and back porch

The Call family arrived in the Salt Lake Valley on September 19, 1848 and continued on to North Canyon (present day Bountiful City) three days later. The family consisted of Anson Call, wife Mary Flint Call, their 2 sons ages 14 and 7, and daughter age 12. The family lived in temporary housing for the first few years, while Anson was called to various missions throughout the west, including the rescue of the Martin-Willie handcart company where he met two English immigrants who later became his wives. The original one-room cabin was built in 1855 and was fitted with a cobblestone fireplace on the south wall which was the only means of cooking for the family, as well as a west facing porch and a pantry.

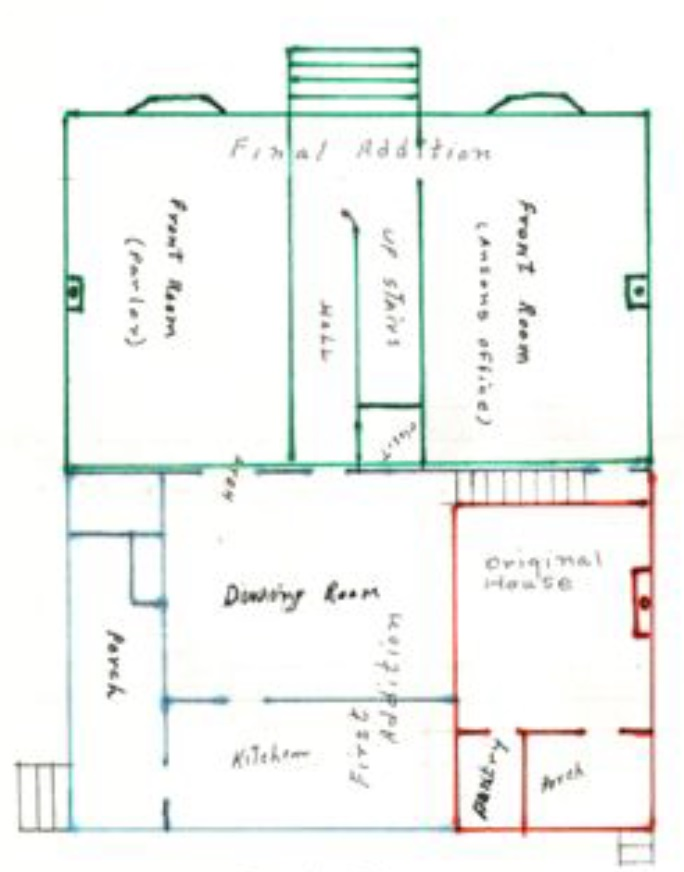
Drawing of the layout of the first floor of the Anson Call House, c/o Lewis and Jean Call

The first additions to the primary home were made in 1857 which included a large dining room and kitchen area with a basement underneath them. A second floor was added with a boarding room that could be used for visitors. A porch was also added, moving the entrance of the home to the north side instead of the south. This porch was used as a storefront until a separate brick structure was completed in 1865 on the northeast corner of the Anson Call homestead, a building which later served as a school, store and separate living quarters.

Underneath the dining room was a pipe laid of bricks, one foot in diameter and the full length of the room. It is believed the pipe was used as a means for storing water collected from the roof at the front of the house, sloping downward in the living area where it could be used for cooking or washing clothes.

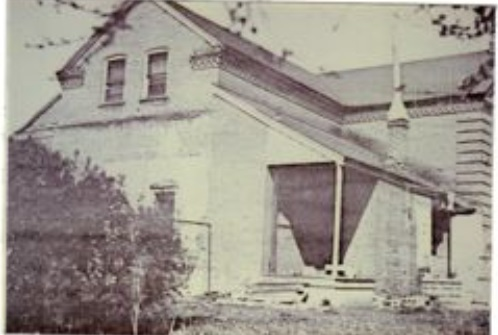
Anson Call House, showing back, west facing wall. Original one-room cabin is evident on the right, with cobblestone fireplace and chimney. The 1857 two-story addition sits north of the original cabin.

Some time between 1859 and 1860 the final red-brick sandstone addition to the Anson Call House was completed, extending the basement, main level, and upper level to the east toward the main road, what is now present day 200 West in Bountiful. The final addition was completed with wood and materials from the same sources as the Bountiful Tabernacle, whose construction had begun in 1857. With the final addition, the entrance was moved once again to the east side of the house where it sits today.

Anson Call was a prominent colonizer, assisting in the establishment of many communities in the west. Call twice served as Bishop to North Canyon Ward as well as President of the Bountiful City United Order established by Brigham Young. The Anson Call home and the surrounding estate served as a social hub for the community in many regards and was often a place of community celebrations and gatherings. The estate grew to include barns, granaries, sheds, gardens, and orchards, while the house remained front and center of the estate. A rock wall was built to enclose all of the estate except for the front of the home facing 200 West where a picket fence was installed.

One contemporary account of the home reads: “It was made of sandstone and red brick. Wide sandstone steps led to the heavy carved door to an entrance hall. On the north and south sides of the entry hall, doors led to two large rooms and at the back behind the stairs, a door led to the living-dining room. The two front rooms were the same size and similar in decoration. Each had a bay window, wide moldings around the ceiling and decorative carved plaster medallions in the center of the ceiling from which hung chandeliers of candles or oil lamps of that period." ---Thora B. Watson

The north room on the main floor was used as the parlor and the room on the south was Anson Call's library and office. These rooms together with the large living room sitting behind the parlor created a large open space to entertain large groups.

A winding staircase in the front entrance hall lead to an upper-level and a door that opened to a captains walk surrounded by a decorative rail and a beehive. Later this balcony was closed off and made into a 6x6 ft prayer room that was reached by a secret staircase from within a closet. To the north and south sides of the prayer room were 2 large rooms the same size and directly above the two rooms from the main floor. The room on the south was Anson Call's bedroom, and the north a bedroom for family members. A dormitory bedroom was extended to the west side of these two rooms, making it the largest in the home which was used for family members and could fit many travelers as needed.

The basement of the east addition had two rooms the same size as the main level front rooms, making three levels of rooms the same size. The basement rooms were not used for living areas but as a cellar. There, the Call family stored potatoes, squash, beets, and carrots. An artesian well was also drilled in the north east corner of the basement to provide access to drinking water year round. A staircase led to the basement cellars directly from outside near the north porch so family members not residing in the main home could access the food storage without entering the living quarters of the home. These basement rooms are connected by beautiful brick archways, including an archway that led to a one hundred foot underground tunnel leading away from the home to the north. The tunnel was used to access an enclosed rock barn and carriage house without having to be exposed to the elements during the winter.

The rock barn and carriage house was added to the complex in 1861, which measured 45 x 35 feet with walls 3 feet thick. At the center were 2 large doors big enough for buggies to enter, which were stored on the north side. Stalls for cows and horses were located on the south side of the barn. There was also a small boarding room under the barn that could be accessed by the underground tunnel coming from the basement archway of the home. The room was reported to be furnished by a cot, a small table with an oilcloth and candle.

Family accounts report the tunnel and boarding room was used by Anson and other Mormon leaders when U.S. marshals were hunting for polygamists during the 1880s.

Today the rock barn and carriage house has long since been torn down and the tunnel filled with dirt to make way for modern housing. The basement entrance to the tunnel is still visible within the home, but has been filled and closed up with bricks.

== Early Historical Significance ==
Anson Call House Hospitality

In 1863, the main celebration for the completion and dedication of the Bountiful Tabernacle was held at the Anson Call house. Where Anson and his family hosted President Brigham Young and “150 persons and 100 horses" providing 3 meals for most of them during their stay. Guests included: Heber C. Kimball, Wilford Woodruff, John Taylor, Daniel H. Wells, Orson Pratt, Franklin D. Richards, George A. Smith and many others.

Christmas in 1863, Anson hosted dinner for the poor of North Canyon Ward and boarded many of them out of the cold.

Family histories contain many accounts of wedding celebrations being held at the Anson Call house, including Call relatives. Anson Call performed the ceremony for the couples at times.

Accounts of events at the Anson Call residence were recorded in The Deseret News. A June 3, 1880 article for example, recorded the celebration of Anson Call's 70th birthday which was attended by his family and many dignitaries of the local community. Another article on October, 3rd 1883 titled “The Golden Wedding” gave an account of the fiftieth wedding anniversary celebration of Anson Call and his wife Mary Call attended by Call's family and many older people of the town.

Visiting Early LDS Leaders

Anson Call was a close associate of Joseph Smith, and Brigham Young throughout early church history, including the Nauvoo period and Joseph Smith's martyrdom. Brigham Young and Anson Call accompanied one another on many assignments and missions throughout the years, including many occasions where Call hosted Young, his counselors and the Apostles of the Latter Day Church of Jesus Christ at his residence. Many visited and stayed in the Anson Call home often due to its central location on the main route between Salt Lake City and Centerville, what is now 200 West.

In October 1857, while in town to give report to Brigham Young, John D. Lee stayed overnight at the Anson Call house just weeks after the event known as the Mountain Meadows massacre. Anson and Mary Call stated in a notarized affidavit that during the visit, Lee communicated a version of events where the massacre was orchestrated only by Paiute Indians. Lee had traveled north to answer a summons from Brigham Young but had not yet been able to give an in person report to Young at the time he visited the Calls.

== "This Old House" ==
Anson Call died in his Bountiful home August 31, 1890. His wife Mary Flint Call lived at the home until she passed October 8, 1901. Their daughter Mary Vashti Call Parks obtained the home after her parents passing. Parks' daughter Charlotte Parks Rampton, Anson's granddaughter, who was married to William Rampton, great uncle to Utah Governor Cal Rampton, was the next resident. After Parks vacated the home, it was occupied by William Waite, husband of Edith Calista Waddoups, another granddaughter of Anson Call.

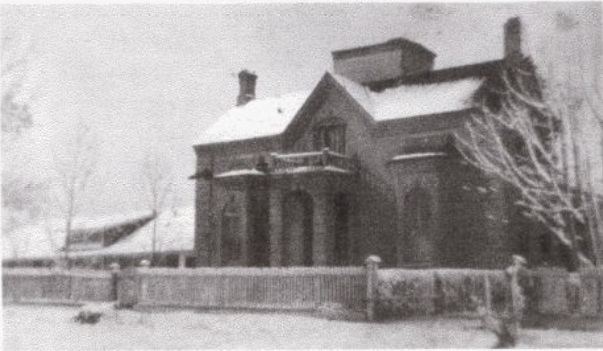
Anson Call House, circa 1920 with attached "Milk Diet" sanitorium on the south side of the home. c/o Lewis & Jean Call

In 1915, the nearly 60 year old home was sold to Henry and Edith Allred, its first occupant outside of the Call family. Allred built an extension on the south side of the home connected to the porch, which he opened as a sanitarium. This “wing” they called it, had 14 rooms and 2 baths. The rooms had open air screens in the summer and were fitted with windows in the winter. In 1916, Allred opened the Bountiful Milk Diet Sanitarium to the public as a sort of specialty spa for a popular diet of the time.

"Out among the flowers, shrubbery and quietude of Bountiful...the inquirer finds one of the most unique and inviting havens of all the country round in what is known as the Bountiful Milk Diet Sanitarium.

"In its conception the projectors have combined the elementals of the Lindlahr nature-cure institutes of Chicago and Elmhurst, Ill. and the milk-and-rest cure of the Porter sanitarium of Burnett, Calif.

"This delightfully home-like retreat reposes in the midst of a six-acre tract, all in cultivation and extremely reminiscent of rural life. Nature at its best smiles from every point of view, and the prolific garden suggests pictures of vegetable delights for the inner man continuously served by the chef of the institution." --The Salt Lake Telegram; October 1, 1916:

Rooms in the Anson Call House were used for the sanitarium as well. The south front room was used as a patient's lounge. The south upstairs room was used for exercise equipment. When all the rooms in the sanitarium wing were occupied, additional tents for patients were pitched up around the yard. Two of the Allred's older children died of smallpox while living at the house.

In July of 1920, the house was sold again, this time to Elizabeth Sardoni. Sardoni's son and his wife were music teachers who occupied the south-wing rooms formerly used for the sanitorium. The two main floor rooms just inside the front entrance were used as music studios to teach piano and violin lessons where many young people in the community received their music training. When Elizabeth's son Lawrence Sardoni was 12 years old, he discovered the hidden room underneath the rock barn once used to harbor polygamists being hunted by U.S. Marshalls. Lawrence later became a music professor at BYU, and organized and conducted the Grand Junction Symphony Orchestra.

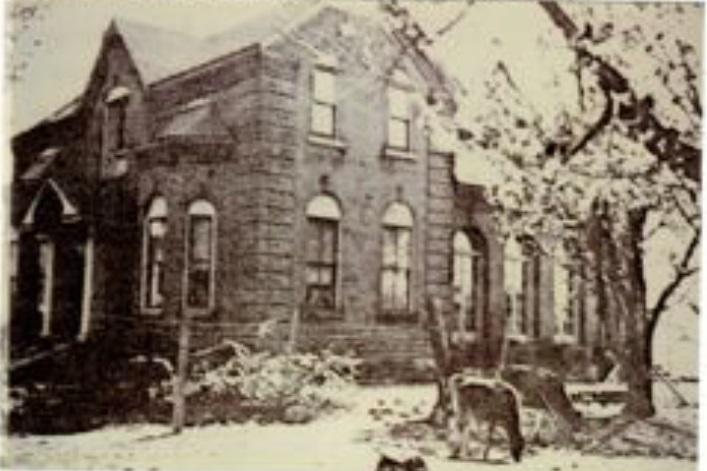
Anson Call house circa 1940 after the Sardoni remodel. North porch is enclosed with updated front entrance

The aging house was in need of repair and the Sardonis "restored it to its original beauty," enclosing the porch on the north side of the structure, adding French doors as well as removing the "prayer room" from the top of the structure. They also changed archway over the front entrance from the brick pillar and balcony format, to the pitched overhang present today.

After the Sardoni's, the home was occupied by Samuel Winn with very few changes.

The house was sold again in 1946 to Dean and Annie Mecham. The Mechams installed the first automated furnace in the home. The Mecham family "raised a lively family which made the old home ring again with children laughing and playing." The Mechams sold the lot just north of the main house to Lewis and Jean Call in 1946 with remnants of the rock barn still standing along with a lone apple tree. Lewis Call is the great-grandson of Anson Call.

Sometime in the 1960s, the home was sold yet again to a Mr. Pontius who divided the structure into apartments before selling the remaining property to Don Winter who then sold the house to J. O. Kingston in the 1970s with two apartments in the main structure. Kingston and various family members occupied the property until a fire displaced the residences of the home in 1997.

In 1997 there was an explosion in the basement of the home. The Kingston family evacuated safely with the fire department arriving soon after. The cause was believed to be gas leak that ignited by the water heater kicking in. The fire damaged much of the north west interior of the home.

As the true history of the home began to fade, some tenants and local children began telling stories of "ghosts" at the home, often accompanied by embellished versions of the house's history. This unfortunately at times has made the property a magnet for vandals and curiosity seekers, as well as amateur "ghost-hunter" and "paranormal" entertainment companies seeking to produce online content.
