= John Lyon (poet) =

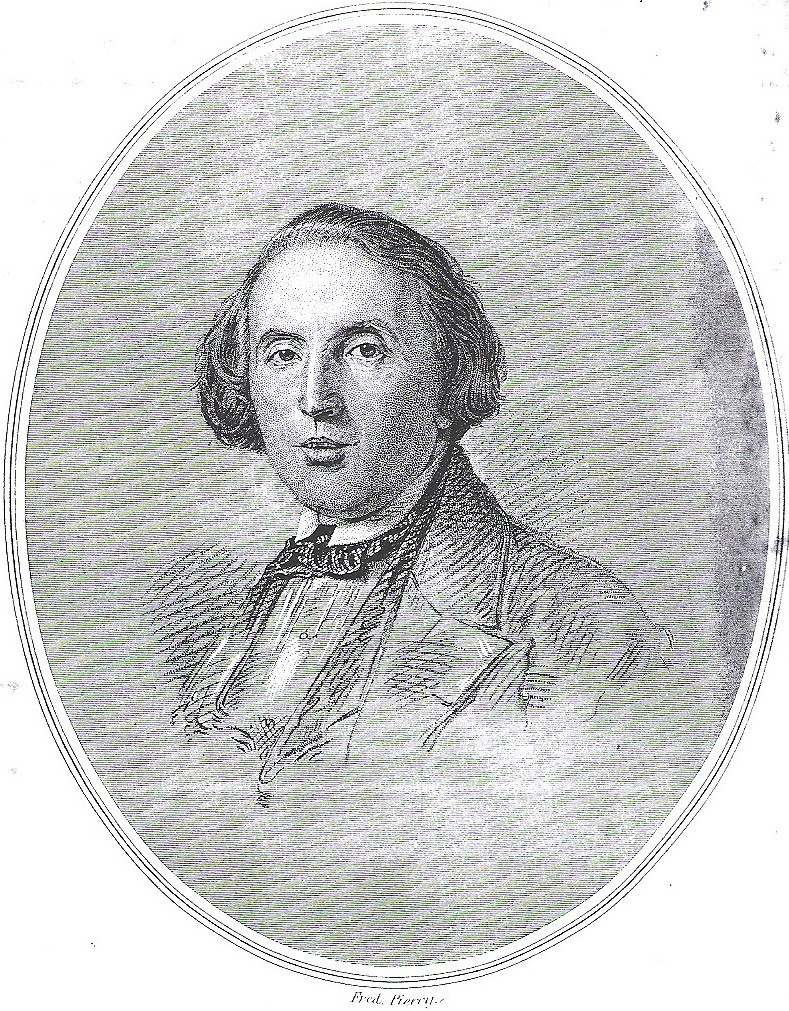
- Born: 4 March 1803; Glasgow, Scotland, United Kingdom of Great Britain and Ireland present-day Glasgow, Scotland, United Kingdom
- Died: 28 November 1889 (aged 86); Salt Lake City, Utah Territory present-day Salt Lake City, Utah, United States
- Occupations: Poet, hymn writer, journalist, weaver, short story writer
- Writing career
- Notable works: "The Apostate", "The Prophet"

Signature
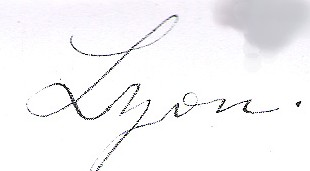

John J. Lyon (4 March 1803, Glasgow – 28 November 1889) was a Scottish Latter Day Saint poet and hymn writer.

== Biography ==
=== Early years ===
John J. Lyon was born to Thomas Lyon and Janet McArthur, a poor and illiterate family in the slums of Glasgow. He was the only child of Thomas and Janet's four children to live to adulthood. Thomas' sister Margaret, who had lost all of her children, adopted five-year-old John in order to alleviate some of her brother's monetary expenses. After less than a year, young Lyon returned to Glasgow after the passing of Margaret's wealthy husband. A year or so later, his father died.

At age eight, Lyon began attending school and did so for only a year and a half. That was the extent of his formal childhood schooling. Young Lyon became an apprentice to an accomplished weaver at age nine (1812). That same year the weaving industry struggled immensely, but Lyon kept at his seven-year apprenticeship. By the time he was twelve, the industry had plummeted enough that young Lyon's shop master quit his trade and granted freedom to Lyon and the rest of his apprentices. Lyon then began pursuing a career in spinning, but after three years in his new apprenticeship, his new shop master released all of his apprentices as had occurred previously.

=== Marriage and Family ===
Lyon continued to pursue a career in weaving and set-out (at age seventeen) to live on his own because his mother was remarried and he did not want to be a part of their new life. In 1824 he moved to Kilmarnock where he had great success in the weaving industry. It is there that he met sixteen year old Janet Thomson. They were married in the Presbyterian church on 23 February 1826 and in September their first child, Thomas, was born. The couple had a total of twelve children, seven of which lived to adulthood. Lyon's lack of schooling as a child pushed him to make sure that his children were well-educated. His children were weavers as he was, but they learned to read and write at an early age.

== Religious Affiliations ==
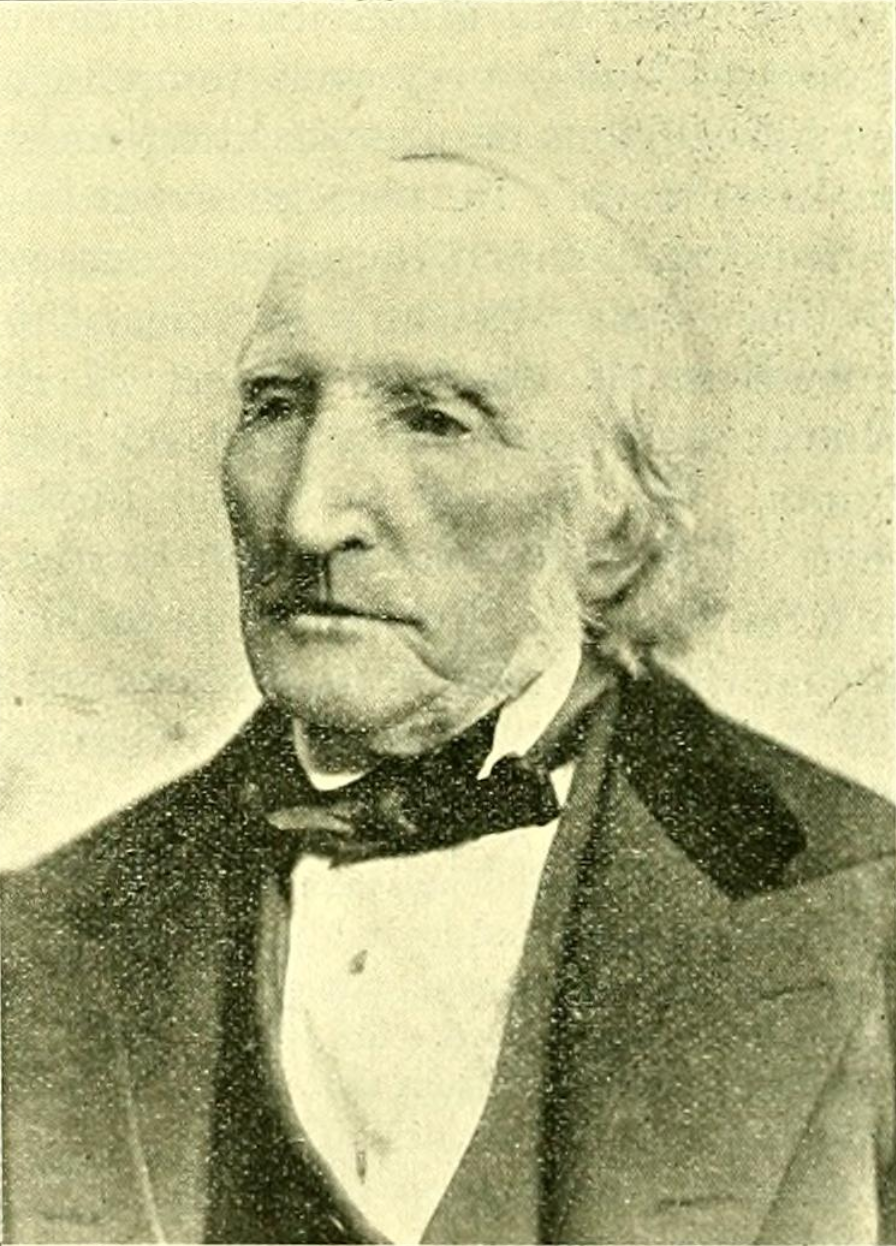
John Lyon

As a child, Lyon was familiarized with the Bible and in turn introduced the Bible to his own children while they were young. He and his wife had no real affiliations with a specific church or congregation during the early years of their marriage.

Many religious reforms occurred in Scotland during the 1830s and 1840s, notably the Great Disruption in 1843. The Church of Scotland, which was Presbyterian, was challenged and many new religious freedoms were granted during this time. In 1837, missionaries from the Church of Jesus Christ of Latter-day Saints arrived in England and thereafter made their way to Scotland. The missionary William Gibson, went to preach in Kilmarnock where he became good friends with Lyon. After reading The Book of Mormon, attending religious sermons, and pondering what he had learned, Lyon was baptized on 30 May 1844. Janet was baptized five weeks later along with their eldest son Thomas. Some of their other children would also be baptized by Gibson in the following months.

On 20 June 1844, Lyon was ordained as an elder in the LDS church and committed himself to the preaching of its message. In February of the following year, Gibson was forced to leave Kilmarnock in order to find work and Lyon was called to become presiding elder of the rapidly growing Kilmarnock LDS Branch. After taking-on such a great responsibility, Lyon stopped working for his religious newspapers and travelled and preached using what little money his family made from weaving. By the end of 1848 there were 107 members of the LDS church in Kilmarnock. In 1846, Franklin D. Richards travelled to Scotland to help with church growth in that country. When he arrived in Kilmarnock, he met with Lyon who was already well known to many American members through works published in the Millennial Star. Lyon accompanied Brother Richards to Glasgow to conduct some church business. On arrival they met with Samuel Richards and apostles Parley P. Pratt and John Taylor.

=== Missionary Work ===
In 1849, Lyon received a letter from Orson Pratt, the Apostle and president of the British Mission, calling him to serve as a missionary and president of the Worcester Conference in England. Leaving his struggling family behind in Scotland, Lyon served from January 1849-December 1851. During the first four months of his mission two of his sons died. He baptized roughly 360 people during his time in the Worcester Conference. Before being released from his missionary service he was already extended a call to be the president of the Glasgow conference, beginning on 1 January 1852. He returned home from his mission and promptly moved his family to Glasgow.

=== The Gathering to Zion ===
After years of waiting and preaching about the gathering, on 27 November 1852 Lyon and his family heard the news that they could begin their journey to Zion. They spent months preparing for what would be an 8,000 mile, seven month excursion. The Lyon family was part of the 11,000 European saints that emigrated between 1853 and 1856. On 19 February 1853 Lyon and family got on the Princess Royal steamship and traveled from Glasgow to Liverpool. They then joined a group of 425 saints on the International and headed toward the United States on a 54 day long voyage. Each night Lyon and other church leaders lead the saints (and anyone else who wanted to participate) in prayer and gospel sermons. Because of these daily sermons and good relations between voyagers, all 48 non-Mormon passengers were baptized, including the captain and crew, making this specific emigration voyage unique. On 23 April 1853 the International docked in New Orleans. On their last day on the International, Lyon was appointed to lead the 237 Ten Pound Saints (referring to the fact that they each paid ten pounds for the journey to Zion).

The Ten Pound Saints stayed in New Orleans for four days before boarding a Mississippi steamer called the Leah Tunah and prepared for the 1,200 mile, eight day trip to St. Louis. The morning after arriving in St. Louis, the saints boarded the Jenny Dean, a small paddle-wheeler, heading to Keokuk, Iowa. They arrived in Iowa on 8 May 1853 and would now be walking the rest of the trip. Because of insufficient funds, the saints stayed in Iowa for one month as some of the men got jobs in order to subsidize money for the necessary travel provisions. On 2 June 1853 Lyon's group of fifty saints and eighteen wagons left Iowa to begin their journey across the plains as part of the Gates Company. They walked an average of twelve miles a day through what was often wet and uncomfortable terrain. After a month, the saints stopped in Council Bluffs for a couple weeks, then crossed the Missouri River and began the last 1,031 miles to arrive in the Great Salt Lake Valley. The Gates Company reached the Great Salt Lake Valley on 30 September 1853. The Lyon family settled near other Scottish emigrants in Salt Lake. In order to support his family, Lyon would work in carpentry and weaving.

=== Life in Zion ===
On 12 January 1854, shortly after settling in Salt Lake, Lyon was sustained as a seventy and then as the president of the 37th Quorum of the Seventies and would serve in that capacity for the next thirty years. Lyon joined the Deseret Dramatic Association, the Universal Scientific Society, the Deseret Press Association, the Deseret Agricultural and Manufacturing society, and others. Lyon became great friends with William C. Staines who would eventually marry Lyon's eighteen-year-old daughter as his second wife. This was the first time that the Lyon family would show their acceptance of plural marriage, commonly practiced in the LDS church at that time. Lyon and Staines worked in the Council House together administering temple ordinances until the Endowment House was built. In March 1855, after the Endowment House was completed and dedicated, Lyon was asked to be its superintendent and worked in that capacity for thirty years. During the 1855 October General Conference of the church, Brigham Young called Lyon, along with twenty-nine other men, as "home missionaries" to strengthen the members in Zion and hold conferences in the area. In 1856 Lyon had a dream that he entered into plural marriage and did so in March of that same year. At age fifty-three, Lyon was sealed to sixteen-year-old Caroline Holland who in the following years would bear seven children.

In August 1857 the saints in Salt Lake found-out that an army was coming to stop a rumored rebellion in Utah. This caused 30,000 saints, including Lyon's family, to move south along with important church documents and other valuables. He, along with 300 other brethren, would stay in Salt Lake until Brigham Young gave the order to return on 28 June 1858. When famous visitors such as Mark Twain and Horace Greeley came to the region, Lyon was able to meet these men and show them his impressive book collection and other gems unique to the Salt Lake area. At the end of 1859 the last of Janet and John's children made it to the Salt Lake Valley after years of postponed travel west. Even with all of his responsibilities in the church, Lyon found time to teach aspiring young actors important elements for acting and was the critic at the Salt Lake Theatre. He taught drama to Maude Adams who would become a famous actress.

From 1867 to 1869, after some conflicting ideas between Lyon and other church leaders regarding free trade and other economic practices, Lyon and his family invested much time and effort into being baptized for their ancestors who had died without becoming members of the LDS church. Lyon was sealed by proxy to four deceased women in 1871 and six more deceased women in 1874. On 7 May 1872, Wilford Woodruff ordained Lyon to be a patriarch in the LDS Church with the approval of Brigham Young, Daniel H. Wells, John Taylor, George Q. Cannon, Brigham Young Jr., and Joseph F. Smith.

When he reached the age of seventy, many saints gave him the title of "Father Lyon" as a sign of respect and friendly intimacy. In 1885, Lyon resigned his service at the Endowment House. On 28 November 1889 at age eighty-six, "Father" John Lyon died due to old age and was outlived by both of his wives.

== Writing career ==
In 1827, Lyon joined an intellectual fraternity where each member would compose a topic to be discussed. At this point in time, Lyon knew very little about reading and writing. Even with such disadvantages, the other members were so intrigued by Lyon's contributions that he was inspired to better his literary skills. After years of study, practice, and drafts, he eventually began publishing his written works in local newspapers and would continue to do so for the next eighteen years. As was customary during this time period, many of Lyon's first works were written and published anonymously in order to protect the author from any form of harassment or blame. During his writing career in Scotland he wrote for eight known newspapers including The Ayr Advertiser, The Kilmarnock Chronicle, and The Witness. He mainly wrote for newspapers in Ayrshire, but in 1834 the first newspapers in Kilmarnock were organized. Because of differences in opinion, Lyon left the papers in Kilmarnock and began writing for more religiously-minded papers.

=== Poetry ===
Before his conversion to the LDS Church, Lyon normally wrote poetry relating to Romanticism, which was popular at the time. Once Lyon was converted, his poems began portraying more optimism and light. The LDS Church newspaper The Millennial Star published copious amounts of work by what they described as "The Scottish Bard". He debuted in Millennial Star on 15 November 1845, when it published his poem "Man". The Star would publish over forty more of his poems. Lyon wrote at least seventy poems during his mission in Worcester, eighteen of which were published in the Star. He began expanding his poetic horizons, authoring many sonnets, songs, and hymns during that same time. Most of his writings referred to essential LDS doctrine, such as the Gathering to Zion.

Writing in January 1849, Orson Spencer said to Orson Pratt that:

Amongst the worth of contributors to the Star, I shall not be deemed invidious to name, distinctly and prominently, our highly esteemed brethren Elders Lyon and Mills. Their genius in the poetic department and the devotedness of their productions to the service of God and his people deserve the fostering care of all the Saints who love the high praise of God in sacred and commemorative songs. The excellent songs and hymns of our poets preach with unmistakable melody and power.

Of Lyon's many poems, 104 of them were collected in his book, The Harp of Zion, which was one of the first complete books of poetry by a Mormon writer, published in 1853. Within a year, 979 copies of The Harp of Zion were sold. All of the proceeds were donated to the church's Perpetual Emigration Fund, allowing European saints to make the journey to Zion. These poems varied from devotional poems, to epics such as "The Apostate", songs, and hymns. More light-hearted works were often written in Lowland Scots such as "Elegy on Wee Hughie", which was about an expired canary:

"But he'll ne'er wake us mair,

"For Hughie is deid"

Some of his poetry was sung to such traditional Scottish tunes as The Lass o' Glenshee. An example of his stronger and more vitriolic work is The Apostate:

"I knew him, ere the roots of bitterness

"Had grown to putrid cancer in his soul.
"Then Revelation's light gleamed o'er his mind
"In strange fantastic dreams of future bliss,
"He saw the dawn, and this was quite enough

"For Speculation's visionary claim"

Before being published in The Harp of Zion, ten of Lyon's hymns were already published in the 1851 LDS hymnal (ninth edition). By 1948 only two of his hymns remained in the hymnals and he currently has no authored works in the LDS hymnal.

=== Writing in Zion ===
Because he was so well known among the saints due to his publications in the Millennial Star and his book of poetry, The Harp of Zion, Lyon had access to many of the different LDS publications. Some of these include Deseret News, the Mountaineer, the Mormon, the Contributor, Tullidge's Quarterly Magazine, and others. "Reflections", Lyon's first published work after arriving in Salt Lake, recounted some of the hardships faced on the journey across the plains. His first publication that spoke specifically about life in Utah tells a story of a polygamist husband in Arabia as not to offend the LDS community while being humorous regarding a topic which members considered to be a sacred practice. Lyon had a strong friendship with Brigham Young and was with him often. At the time of Young's death, Lyon composed a poem in admiration of his friend entitled Brigham, the Bold.

After Lyon's death in 1889 his son began a printing business and began collecting his father's works which were scattered in different journals and other mediums across Utah.In 1923, seventy-one poems and fourteen stories were compiled and published in one volume called Songs of a Pioneer. All of these works were written between 1854 and 1885.

== See also ==
- List of Latter Day Saint practitioners of plural marriage
