= Alex Joseph =

American mayor (1936–1998)

Mayor of Big Water
- In office 1983–1994
- Succeeded by: Geraldine Rankin

Personal details
- Born: Alec Richard Joseph; June 24, 1936 Merced, California, U.S.
- Died: September 27, 1998 (aged 62)
- Party: Libertarian
- Other political affiliations: Republican
- Children: 21

Military service
- Allegiance: United States
- Branch/service: United States Marine Corps
- Battles/wars: Korean War

Alex Joseph (June 24, 1936 – September 27, 1998) (born Alec Richard Joseph; also referred to as Ronald Ellison) was an American polygamist and founder of the Confederate Nations of Israel, a Mormon fundamentalist sect. As mayor of Big Water, Utah, Joseph was the first Libertarian Party mayor of a community in the United States.

== Early life ==
Joseph was born on June 24, 1936, in Merced, California. At the age of 17, he enlisted in the U.S. Marine Corps and served two tours during the Korean War.

== Mormon fundamentalism ==
Joseph was not raised in the Greek Orthodox Church, but was baptized into it in his late teens. He became a member of the Church of Jesus Christ of Latter-day Saints (LDS Church) in 1965. In 1969, he abandoned the LDS Church and briefly joined a group of Mormon fundamentalists under the leadership of Rulon C. Allred in Pinesdale, Montana. In time, he convinced four students at the University of Montana to marry him and become his plural wives. His wives were not Latter Day Saints; rather, two were Roman Catholics, one was a Methodist, and one was a Presbyterian. The parents of the students were outraged and confronted Allred with their displeasure. Allred was displeased that Joseph had married without his permission, and after Joseph pointed out that Allred had also taken multiple wives, Joseph was asked to leave the colony in Montana. Joseph's exposure to Mormon fundamentalist groups led him to see them as oppressive and corrupt. "Atrocities are committed and people have no recourse because they're outside the law, like the Mafia", commented Joseph. From then on, Joseph followed his own Christian-based religious convictions.

Elizabeth Joseph, one of Alex Joseph's wives who served as Big Water City Attorney and an instructor at Coconino Community College, was a featured speaker at the Utah NOW conference in 1997.

=== Polygamy ===
Joseph's style of polygamy was formed out of his own reading of the Bible, and contrasted with that practiced by some other Mormon fundamentalists in some notable ways. First, his wives entered the marriages of their own accord, with initiative, and free will, rather than being designated by paternal authority. Second, his wives were encouraged to be very independent. Third, he was open about his polygamist lifestyle rather than being secretive and welcomed media coverage, believing that it is his constitutional right and because "he wants public opinion on his side".

== Big Water and Confederate Nations of Israel ==
Joseph and his wives moved to Kane County, Utah to a deserted settlement known as Glen Canyon City; Joseph renamed the settlement Big Water in 1983. Joseph became the first mayor of the newly renamed settlement. In 1977, he organized the Church of Jesus Christ in Solemn Assembly and the Confederate Nations of Israel, a hybrid church–political organization modelled after Mormonism's Council of Fifty.

== Libertarian mayor ==
In April 1986, Joseph made news when he abandoned the Republican Party and joined the Libertarian Party and by so doing became the first American mayor to be a member of the Libertarian Party. Joseph also convinced the four other members of the town council to join the Libertarians, thereby creating America's first "Libertarian Party town government" in Big Water. The Libertarian government abolished all taxes on real estate in the town. Joseph stepped down as mayor in 1994 after serving three consecutive terms.

== Occupations, family and death ==
At different times in his life, Joseph was employed as a U.S. Marine, a police officer, a firefighter, a mail carrier, a car salesman, an accountant, an author of books, a health food producer, a private investigator, and a manager for country and western music performers. He also starred in a movie about himself known as Alex Joseph and His Wives. He requested that his occupation on his death certificate be listed as "pirate". Although it has been estimated that he may have married up to twenty women at various times, Joseph was survived by seven wives and 14 biological children, as well as several adopted or fostered children. He died of liver cancer at the age of 62.

== Electoral history ==
1988 Kane County commission election
Party	Candidate	Votes	%	±%
Republican	Jack Maxwell	1,387	65.52%	
Democratic	Vern Blanchard	602	28.44%	
Libertarian	Alex Joseph	128	6.05%	
Total votes		2,117	100.00%	

== Works cited ==
- Brian C. Hales (2006). Modern Polygamy and Mormon Fundamentalists : The Generations after the Manifesto (Salt Lake City, Utah: Greg Kofford Books)
