= Willy Marshall =

Utah Libertarian politician

Willy Star Marshall is an American Libertarian politician and became the first openly gay mayor in Utah when he was elected in 2001 to serve as the mayor of the town of Big Water, Utah. He served in that position until 2005.

In keeping with his libertarian principles, Marshall repealed his municipal salary. He also cut municipal taxes by 50 percent and attempted to decriminalize marijuana. The county government prevented full implementation of the decriminalization.

Marshall campaigned unsuccessfully from 1982 to 1996 for election to serve as a member of the Utah House of Representatives, the Utah State Senate, and the United States House of Representatives before his mayoral campaign in 2000. He was a delegate to the 2020 Libertarian National Convention, which was held at the Orange County Convention Center in Orlando, Florida.
