= Bountiful Tabernacle =

Historic church in Utah, United States

- U.S. National Register of Historic Places
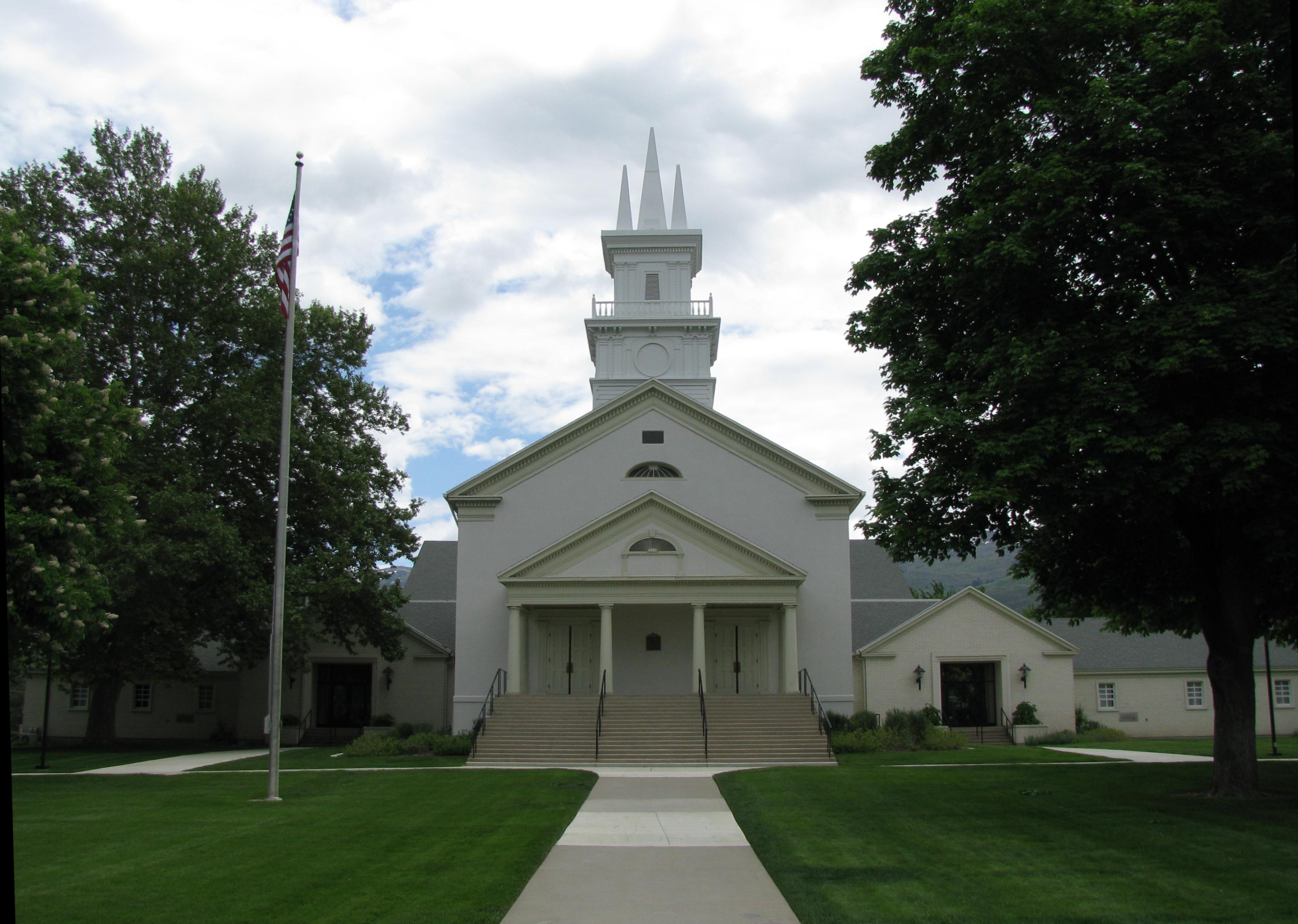

- Location within Utah Location within the United States
- Location: Main and Center Sts., Bountiful, Utah
- Coordinates: 40°53′21″N 111°52′43″W
- Area: 2.8 acres (1.1 ha)
- Built: 1857
- Architect: Farnham, Augustus
- Architectural style: Greek Revival
- NRHP reference No.: 76001813
- Added to NRHP: January 1, 1976

Bountiful Tabernacle is a historic Mormon tabernacle building at Main and Center Streets in Bountiful, Utah, United States.

== Description ==
The Greek Revival building was designed by Augustus Farnham and was begun in 1857. Work was suspended that year during the time of the Utah Expedition, also known as Buchanan's Blunder. But the structure was finally completed in 1863, including its mural of Joseph Smith, commissioned by Brigham Young and painted by Daniel Waggelund.

The Bountiful Tabernacle was dedicated by Elder Heber C. Kimball on 14–15 March 1863. Church leaders including Brigham Young and "150 persons and 100 horses" stayed overnight at the nearby Anson Call residence to celebrate the completion and dedication.

The Bountiful Tabernacle was Farnham's most significant work, and became known worldwide. In 1976 it was added to the National Register of Historic Places.

== See also ==
- National Register of Historic Places listings in Davis County, Utah
