= Big Water, Utah =

Town in the state of Utah, United States

- Town
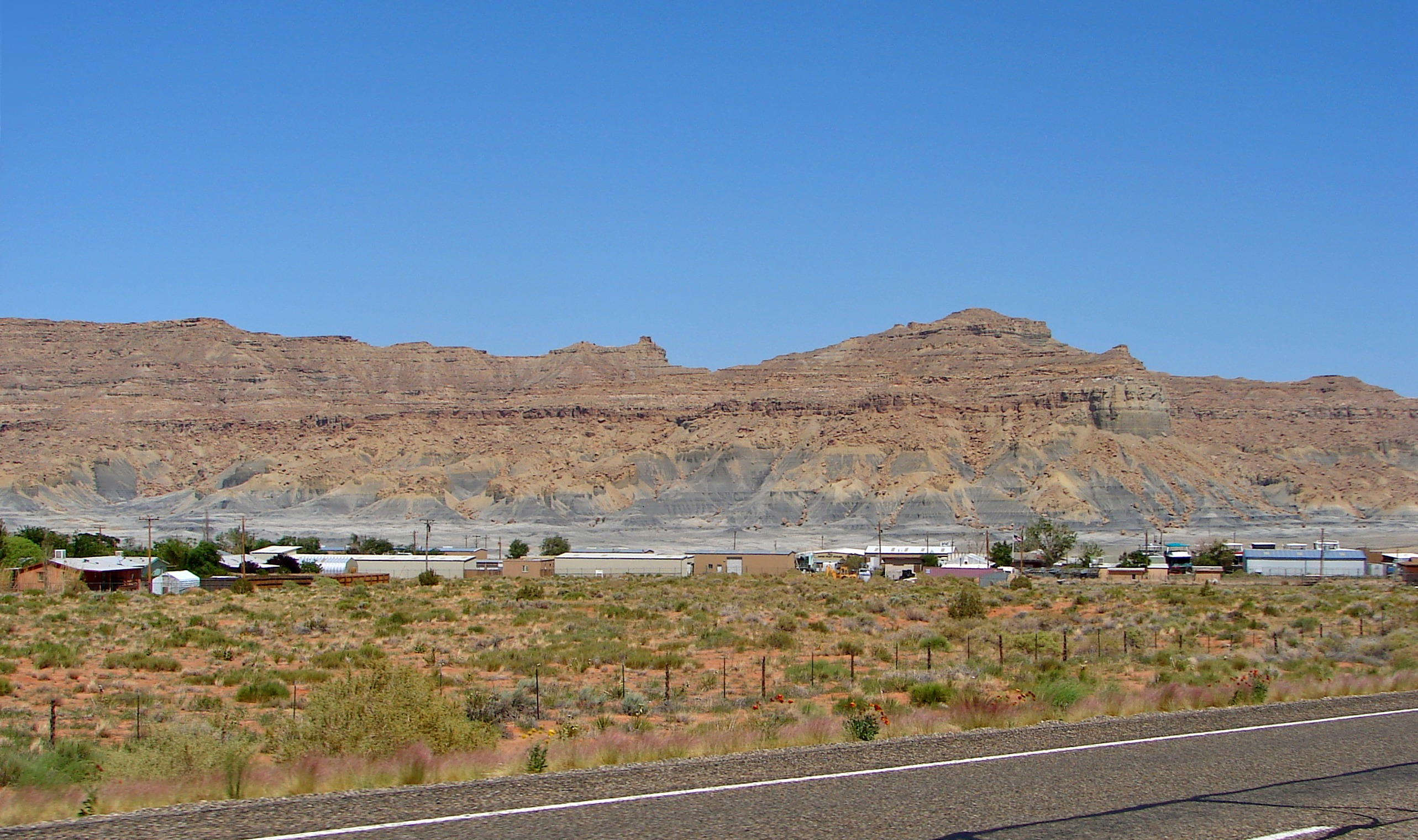

- Location in Kane County and the state of Utah

- Location of Utah in the United States
- Coordinates: 37°4′47″N 111°39′29″W
- Country: United States
- State: Utah
- County: Kane
- Incorporated: December 29, 1983

Area
  - Total: 5.99 sq mi (15.52 km^{2})
  - Land: 5.99 sq mi (15.52 km^{2})
  - Water: 0 sq mi (0.00 km^{2})
- Elevation: 4,108 ft (1,252 m)

Population (2020)
  - Total: 449
  - Density: 85.3/sq mi (32.92/km^{2})
- Time zone: UTC-7 (MST)
  - Summer (DST): UTC-6 (MDT)
- ZIP code: 84741
- Area code: 435
- FIPS code: 49-05534
- GNIS feature ID: 1455970

Big Water is a town in Kane County, Utah, United States. The population was 449 at the 2020 census, down from 475 at the 2010 census. It is located 17 miles (27 km) northwest of Page, Arizona, on US-89 near Lake Powell and the Glen Canyon Dam. It was originally called Glen Canyon City and housed workers who built the dam in the 1950s.

Big Water made news in the 1980s as a polygamous colony of the Joseph clan. It also made news in 1986, when the mayor Alex Joseph and the city council left the Republican Party to join the Libertarian Party. This made Joseph the first Libertarian city mayor in the history of the U.S. Subsequently, Willy Marshall, also a Libertarian, was elected as the state's first openly gay mayor in 2001.

It was the first place in the United States with a city council where every member was in the Libertarian Party.

== Geography ==
According to the United States Census Bureau, the town has a total area of 6.2 square miles (16.0 km^{2}), all of it land.

=== Climate ===
According to the Köppen Climate Classification system, Big Water has a semi-arid climate, abbreviated "BSk" on climate maps.

Climate data for Big Water, Utah (1991–2020 normals, extremes 1962–1974, 1986–present)
Month	Jan	Feb	Mar	Apr	May	Jun	Jul	Aug	Sep	Oct	Nov	Dec	Year
Record high °F (°C)	71 (22)	77 (25)	85 (29)	96 (36)	104 (40)	111 (44)	112 (44)	109 (43)	105 (41)	97 (36)	91 (33)	69 (21)	112 (44)
Mean maximum °F (°C)	57.6 (14.2)	65.5 (18.6)	77.2 (25.1)	86.6 (30.3)	94.9 (34.9)	103.4 (39.7)	106.3 (41.3)	102.6 (39.2)	97.2 (36.2)	88.0 (31.1)	71.0 (21.7)	58.7 (14.8)	106.6 (41.4)
Mean daily maximum °F (°C)	45.2 (7.3)	52.3 (11.3)	62.5 (16.9)	70.9 (21.6)	81.0 (27.2)	93.0 (33.9)	97.8 (36.6)	94.5 (34.7)	86.7 (30.4)	72.0 (22.2)	56.7 (13.7)	44.8 (7.1)	71.5 (21.9)
Daily mean °F (°C)	34.2 (1.2)	40.3 (4.6)	48.6 (9.2)	56.1 (13.4)	65.3 (18.5)	76.2 (24.6)	82.4 (28.0)	79.9 (26.6)	71.5 (21.9)	57.8 (14.3)	44.2 (6.8)	34.7 (1.5)	57.6 (14.2)
Mean daily minimum °F (°C)	23.3 (−4.8)	28.2 (−2.1)	34.6 (1.4)	41.2 (5.1)	49.5 (9.7)	59.4 (15.2)	67.1 (19.5)	65.2 (18.4)	56.3 (13.5)	43.6 (6.4)	31.7 (−0.2)	24.6 (−4.1)	43.7 (6.5)
Mean minimum °F (°C)	14.4 (−9.8)	18.6 (−7.4)	24.9 (−3.9)	30.4 (−0.9)	38.2 (3.4)	48.8 (9.3)	58.7 (14.8)	57.8 (14.3)	45.6 (7.6)	32.0 (0.0)	21.1 (−6.1)	14.0 (−10.0)	11.8 (−11.2)
Record low °F (°C)	−6 (−21)	−3 (−19)	15 (−9)	21 (−6)	28 (−2)	37 (3)	51 (11)	46 (8)	37 (3)	15 (−9)	13 (−11)	−3 (−19)	−6 (−21)
Average precipitation inches (mm)	0.72 (18)	0.81 (21)	0.72 (18)	0.53 (13)	0.51 (13)	0.20 (5.1)	0.47 (12)	0.91 (23)	0.81 (21)	1.00 (25)	0.43 (11)	0.56 (14)	7.67 (195)
Average precipitation days (≥ 0.01 in)	3.9	4.7	4.5	3.2	3.3	1.6	3.7	5.4	4.2	4.3	2.3	3.8	44.9
Source: NOAA

== Demographics ==
Historical population
Census	Pop.	Note	%±
1980	154		—
1990	326		111.7%
2000	417		27.9%
2010	475		13.9%
2020	449		−5.5%
U.S. Decennial Census

As of the census of 2000, there were 417 people, 171 households, and 117 families residing in the town. The population density was 68.7 people per square mile (26.5/km^{2}). There were 264 housing units at an average density of 43.5 per square mile (16.8/km^{2}). The racial makeup of the town was 94.00% White, 2.88% Native American, 0.24% Asian, 0.48% Pacific Islander, 1.20% from other races, and 1.20% from two or more races. Hispanic or Latino of any race were 5.28% of the population.

There were 171 households, out of which 32.2% had children under the age of 18 living with them, 52.6% were married couples living together, 12.3% had a female householder with no husband present, and 31.0% were non-families. 26.3% of all households were made up of individuals, and 5.8% had someone living alone who was 65 years of age or older. The average household size was 2.44, and the average family size was 2.97.

In the town, the population was spread out, with 28.5% under 18, 6.5% from 18 to 24, 25.9% from 25 to 44, 31.2% from 45 to 64, and 7.9% who were 65 years of age or older. The median age was 39 years. For every 100 females, there were 103.4 males. For every 100 females aged 18 and over, there were 106.9 males.

The median income for a household in the town was $30,278, and the median income for a family was $37,917. Males had a median income of $29,091 versus $17,917 for females. The per capita income for the town was $15,026. About 11.0% of families and 14.5% of the population were below the poverty line, including 16.1% of those under age 18 and 22.2% of those aged 65 or over.

== See also ==
- List of cities and towns in Utah
