= Ogden Kraut =

American polygamist, author and publisher

- Born: Ogden Wedlund Kraut; June 21, 1927; Montana, United States
- Died: July 17, 2002 (aged 75); Salt Lake City, Utah
- Spouse(s): Around five, including Anne Wilde
- Writing career
- Language: English
- Subject: Mormon fundamentalism
- Website: ogdenkraut.com

Ogden Wedlund Kraut (June 21, 1927 – July 17, 2002) was an American polygamist, author and publisher who became best known for his writings about Mormon fundamentalist topics. Kraut was an independent fundamentalist who never joined any fundamentalist group. He published his writings and other historical church writings through his Pioneer Press.

== Biography ==
=== Early life ===
Ogden was born in Shelby, Montana, to Johannes Joseph Kraut (1900–1960) and Beatrice Theone Mae Nelson Kraut (1905–1984). His only sibling, Dana Joseph Kraut (1935–2001), was born in Montana on May 7, 1935.

In his late teens, Ogden converted to the Church of Jesus Christ of Latter-day Saints (LDS Church), attended Shelby High School, and worked for the Great Northern Railway Company.

Ogden worked at the Dream (Relief) Mine in Salem, Utah, with Bishop John Hyrum Koyle Jr (1864–1949).

In 1948, Ogden was studying psychology at Brigham Young University.

In September 1948, Ogden began serving as an LDS missionary in the California Mission in southern California & Arizona, where Judge Oscar Walter McConkie Sr (1887–1966; father of Apostle Bruce Redd McConkie) was the mission president. He was one of the last LDS missionaries to serve "without purse or scrip" (financed entirely by donations from the church or from those to whom they taught), and wrote a book about those times. Reflecting on his experiences, he remarked that "there was no cookbook to go by on how to do it. We just went out there and struggled along trying to figure out how to do it the most effective way." He continued by saying that, by the end of the mission, "I felt that I could travel around the world that way... it was easy for me to do," and when asked if he missed meals, his standard response was "no but I've postponed a lot of them." Kraut believed this method of missionary activity to be a commandment, saying that the missionary program started to decline when the Elders "began to rely on the money from home instead of in the Lord. That's not the way it's supposed to be done. They changed the rules on the Lord. He didn't."

In 1952, Ogden won second place in the Rhine Military Post Special Services Photo Contest while spending two years in the U.S. Army stationed at Bad Kreuznach, Germany, as a Signal Corps photographer in the U.S. Occupation Forces.

On May 8, 1953, Ogden married Mona "Louise" McBride (1933–2003) in the LDS Mesa Arizona Temple. They held a wedding reception in her hometown of Pima, Arizona, on the following day. They eventually had five children.

=== Fundamentalist activities ===
Ogden developed a testimony of polygamy after studying LDS doctrine and church history. Kraut was set apart as a fundamentalist Seventy by Joseph White Musser (1872–1954; fundamentalist leader in Short Creek) but simultaneously continued to serve as an LDS Elder in the mainline church.

Ogden waited until 1969 to marry a second wife, Anne B. Wilde. He also married Mildred Lorraine Stahl Nielsen (1935–2015). He had a total of around five wives, although the exact number was never made public.

Kraut wrote books, some self-published, on fundamentalist topics. His 95 Theses, named after the famous document by Martin Luther, includes specific charges against doctrinal changes in the LDS Church. His first breakthrough publication was the book Jesus Was Married in 1969, and he would go on to publish 65 books with his second wife Anne Wilde. He also published books by other authors.

Kraut was known to keep a distance from other fundamentalist groups. He believed they had no authority to build their own churches and defended his independent lifestyle, citing the purported 1886 Revelation attributed to Mormon president John Taylor:

John Taylor authorized and set apart several men to perpetuate the principle of plural marriage and gave them the calling to perform such marriage, regardless of what the Church or the government might say or do .... There is no mention of setting up a church, taking tithing, having weekly meetings, or setting up a colony somewhere. Their calling (or keys) was to (1) live plural marriage, (2) perform plural marriage sealings, and (3) set apart others with this same calling.

In 1972, Kraut was excommunicated from the LDS Church by Grantsville Stake President Kenneth Clark Johnson Sr (1917–2009) for "apostasy", which included his belief in polygamy. The FBI investigated claims that the church had conducted a wiretapping operation against Kraut.

Kraut was briefly affiliated with the Confederate Nations of Israel, a loose network of fringe religious practitioners founded in 1977 by Alex Joseph. The group consisting of some 400 members spread throughout the United States. About a quarter of the membership practiced some type of polygamy. However, this was not an LDS fundamentalist sect but rather a confederation of independent "patriarchs" which included "Catholics, Protestants, Eastern religionists, atheists, and sexually-active homosexuals". Kraut was initially one of these patriarchs, although he later withdrew.

The Singer–Swapp standoff occurred on January 16–28, 1988 near Marion, Utah. Members of a fundamentalist Mormon group bombed a local church, which led to an armed standoff with law enforcement. Ogden, who was acquainted with the family at the center of the incident, was permitted to bring them food and supplies on January 25. He carried letters between Utah Governor Norman Howard Bangerter (1933–2015) and the polygamists. Authorities wished to counter public perceptions that they were employing psychological warfare and or siege tactics. Law enforcement hoped that Kraut or the governor's letter would influence the outlaws to negotiate or surrender, though ultimately one law officer died and officials forced their way into the Swapp compound. Nonetheless, Kraut's attempts at mediating and de-estalating the situation won him the respect of the law enforcement agencies. Later, when Kraut's polygamy became more widely known, the local FBI chief and Utah attorney general intervened to protect Kraut's position as a civilian employee of the U.S. Army.

In 1989, Kraut was quoted as estimating that "there are probably at least 30,000 people who consider themselves as Fundamentalist Mormons, espousing at least the belief in the doctrine of plural marriage." While he had used the 30,000 estimate in previous remarks, this one was the first time he specified that some do not live plural marriage but merely have a belief in it, thus bringing his estimate of active polygamists downwards. Regarding those not actively living plural marriage, Kraut also became known for claiming that there are "professors of religion that I'm acquainted with who believe all the doctrines of Fundamentalism, and yet they're teaching at BYU, seminaries, and institutes" within the LDS church. In another interview, he added that among these fundamentalist sympathizers were "high councilmen, bishops, and in some cases stake [diocese] presidents."

In an interview around 1990, Kraut said that conversions by mainstream Mormons to fundamentalism increase sharply after every change the LDS church makes in doctrine and policy, and that those changes occur often enough that fundamentalists regularly gain new members. However, he also added that "actually there's a lot of people who are not Mormons who become interested in Fundamentalism." Despite this, fundamentalists naturally also received hostile treatment from time to time, and after one of his families moved into a new neighborhood, someone had smashed out their windows and reportedly also threw severed duck heads onto their porch.

In his 1996 work The One Mighty and Strong, Kraut mirrored the common fundamentalist belief that the mainstream LDS church is "out of order" but that it will eventually be set "in order", writing that "the setting in order of the House of God will be a greater event than the Restoration. What failed in the beginning will succeed in the end. The miracles will be greater, the number of converts will be more numerous; the power and wealth of the Saints will be richer; and Zion—the New Jerusalem—will finally be built."

Nonetheless, Kraut had also expressed criticisms of some aspects of fundamentalist culture. He viewed negatively the desire of some men to obtain social status by acquiring as many wives as possible, and looked down on the lack of academic standards among some families who chose to pursue homeschooling, saying that, for this subset of youngsters, "it had been better for them to go to public schools, than to stay home and to do nothing."

== Personal life ==
In 1960, Ogden was living in Fruita, Colorado, where he was working as a real estate agent and State Farm Insurance agent.

Ogden worked as a scientific photographer at the U.S. Army Dugway Proving Ground in Dugway, Utah, in 1966–1990.

Ogden died in Salt Lake City, Utah, on July 17, 2002, from liver cancer. His obituary was published in the Salt Lake Tribune and the Deseret News on July 19, 2002, and he was buried in the Salem City Cemetery (block 101, lot 5, grave 6) in Salem, Utah, on July 22, 2002.

Ogden's son Kevin Kraut continues to discuss his father's legacy and publish his old writings through Old Pioneer Press.

Despite their divergent views on Mormonism, Ogden was on friendly terms with authors Jerald and Sandra Tanner who were often sharply critical of LDS history and beliefs. Ronald V. Huggins's book Lighthouse: Jerald & Sandra Tanner, Despised and Beloved Critics of Mormonism published by Signature Books in summer 2022, includes some anecdotes about Ogden's relationship with the late Jerald Tanner.
