= Mormonism and violence =

The history of the Latter Day Saint movement, founded in 1830 in upstate New York by Joseph Smith, includes numerous instances of violence.

Early Mormons faced significant persecution and mob violence. Forced expulsions from Missouri in the 1830s left thousands destitute, and further expulsions from Illinois followed the assassination of Joseph Smith and his brother by a mob in 1844, while both were in state custody. In response, early Mormons organized militias and occasionally engaged in violent confrontations; the Danites, a vigilante group briefly sanctioned by Mormon leaders, conducted armed raids in Missouri during the 1838 Mormon War.

In the western United States, Mormon settlers were involved in prolonged conflicts with Native American tribes, including the Walker War and the Black Hawk War, where episodes such as the Battle Creek Massacre and the Circleville Massacre occurred. The Mountain Meadows Massacre of 1857, in which a Mormon militia and allied Paiute Indians killed over 100 emigrants from the Baker–Fancher wagon train, occurred during the Utah War.

== History of violence and Mormons ==
=== Smith and Rigdon tarred and feathered in Ohio ===
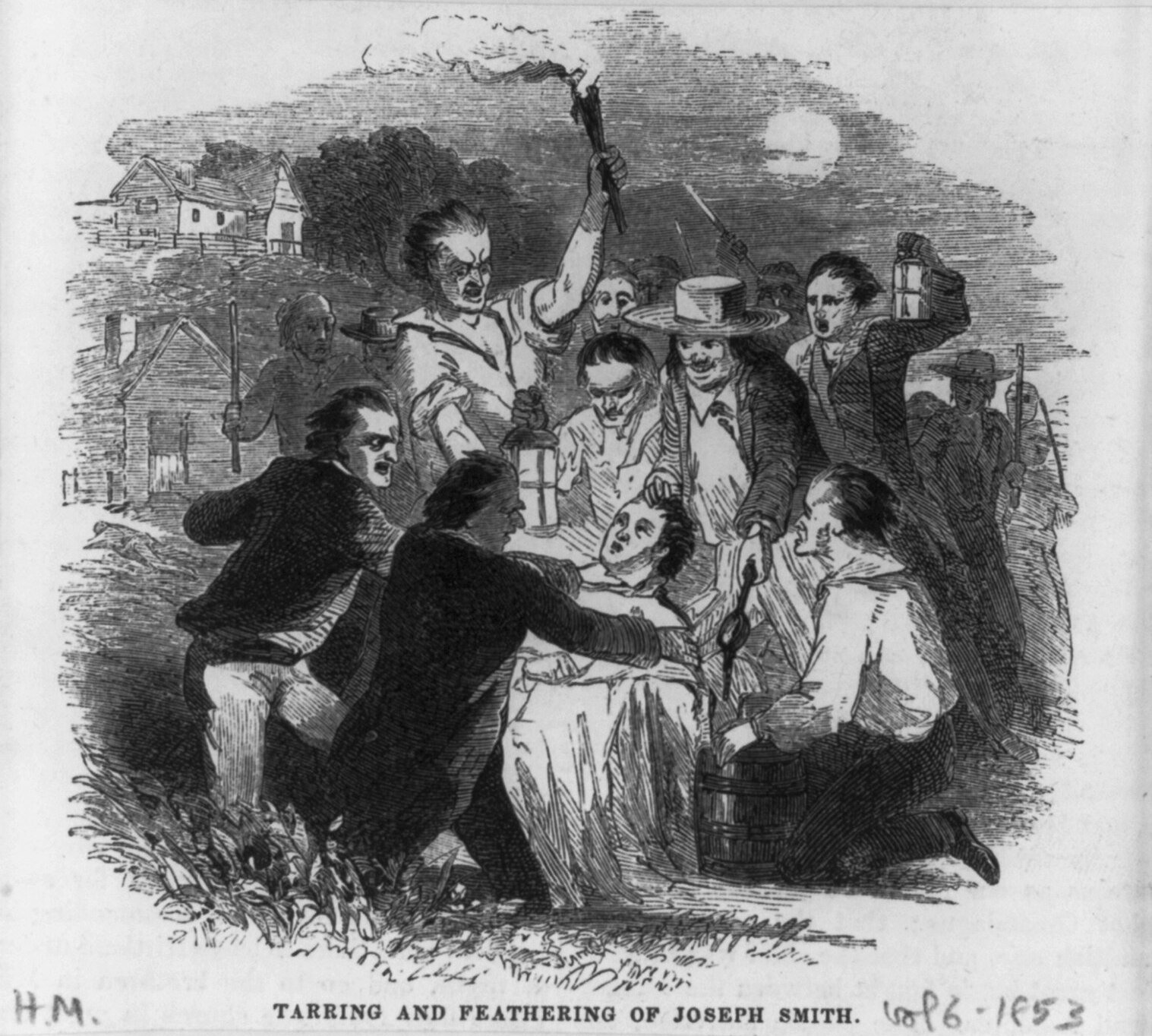
Illustration of a mob tarring and feathering Joseph Smith.

On the night of March 24, 1832, Joseph Smith and Sidney Rigdon were attacked by a mob at the Johnson home in Hiram, Ohio. They were dragged from their bed, beaten, tarred and feathered, and reportedly threatened with castration. The mob also attempted to force poison into Smith's mouth, resulting in the loss of a tooth and chemical burns to his skin. Despite his injuries, Smith preached a sermon the following morning and baptized three individuals.

Clark Braden, an anti-Mormon polemicist later cited by Fawn Brodie, alleged the attack was motivated by rumors of sexual impropriety involving Nancy Marinda Johnson. Braden’s account included factual errors, such as misidentifying Eli Johnson as Marinda’s brother rather than her uncle. Most contemporary sources point to Smith and Rigdon's doctrines, particularly consecration, as the motive of the attack. Historian Richard Bushman disputes Braden's and Brodie's theory for "lack of credible evidence".

=== Violent expulsion from Jackson County ===
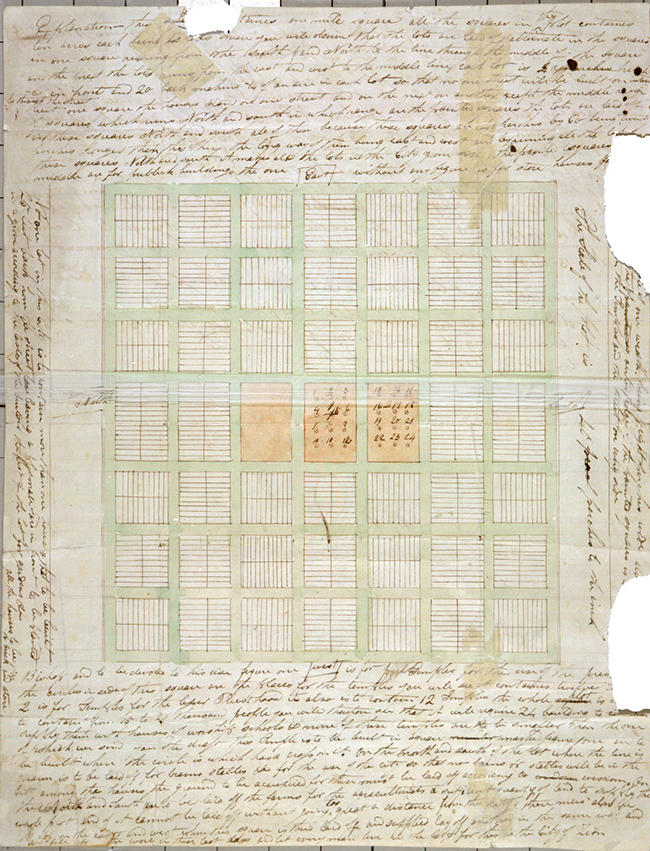
This one page Plat written in June 1833 by Joseph Smith defines a comprehensive multiple city plan.

Shortly after the formal organization of the Church of Christ in upstate New York in 1830, Mormon missionaries conducted expeditions and began establishing permanent settlements in western Missouri, particularly in Jackson County, starting in 1831. On July 20, 1831, Joseph Smith announced a revelation designating Independence, the county seat of Jackson, as the site of the City of Zion -- the New Jerusalem, a physical, Millennial city to be populated by latter-day saints. Smith dedicated the Temple Lot in Independence as the site of the Zion Temple on August 3, 1831. A comprehensive plat was devised by Smith in 1833, describing the planned city as an organized grid system of blocks and streets, with blocks house lots that alternated in direction by columns of blocks between north-south streets.

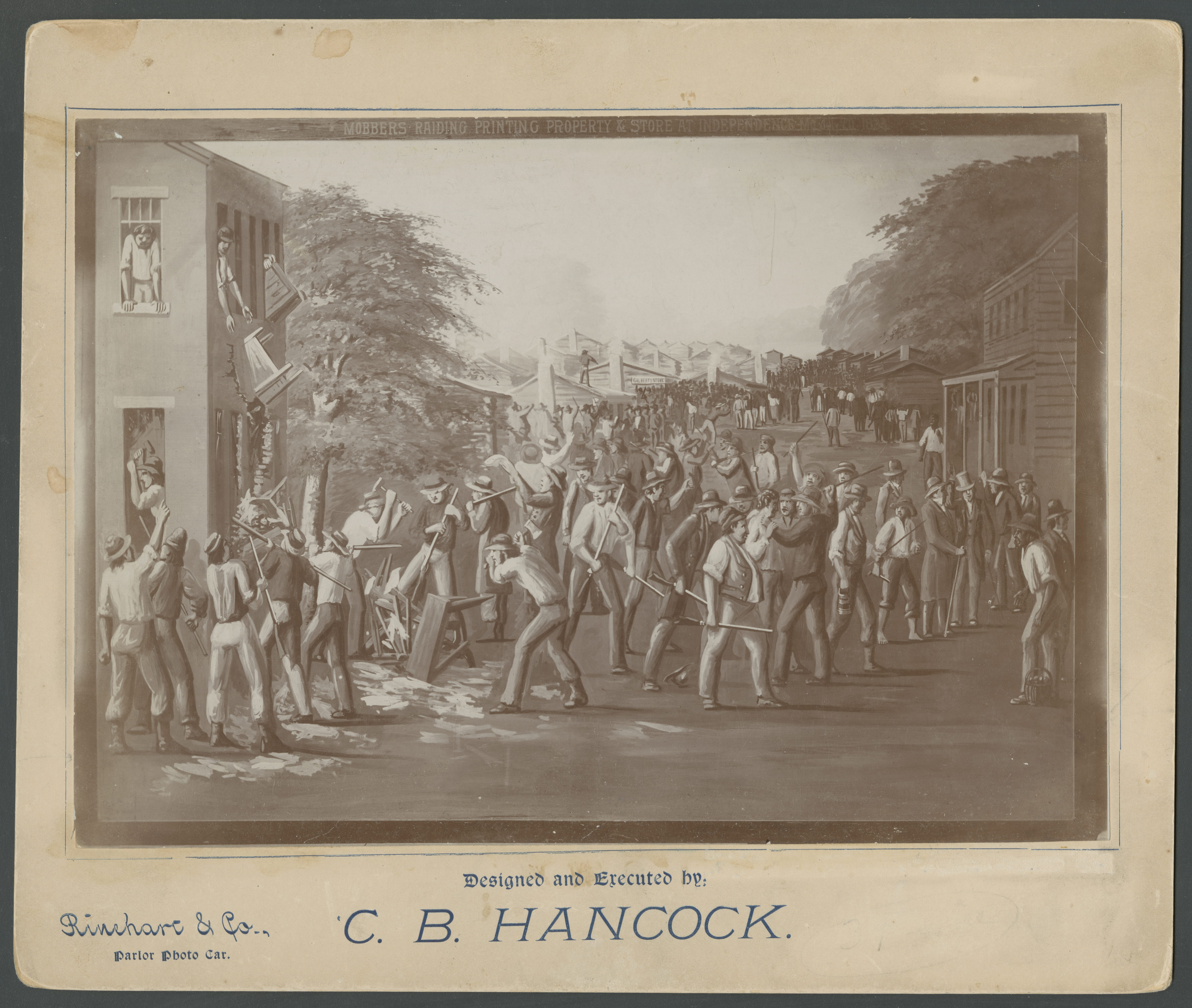
Destruction of the printing press, by C.C.A Christensen

The rapid growth of the Mormon population and their distinct religious beliefs created tension with existing non-Mormon residents. The Mormons' economic cohesion, marked by their collective land purchases and successful agricultural endeavors, and their proselytizing among Native Americans and African-Americans, heightened the fears and anxieties of the non-Mormon community.

In July 1833, tensions boiled over when the Mormon newspaper in Independence published an issue that was controversial with the non-Mormon residents of the county. At a meeting, non-Mormons adopted a statement accusing the Mormons of planning to take over the county, inviting free black settlers, and having a corrupting influence" on their slaves. Locals attacked the Mormon press, razed the building, and scattered the type on the street. They then targeted the homes of the Mormon leaders, dragged, tarred and feathered them, and issued an ultimatum demanding that all Mormons leave the county.

On November 4, some 50 Missourians gathered near the Big Blue River and captured the Mormon ferry. A gunfire exchange ensued which resulted in the death of one Mormon and two non-Mormons. After the local militia intervened, the Mormons surrendered their arms and agreed to leave the county within ten days. The Mormons were given a short amount of time to comply; when they refused to leave, a violent expulsion occurred. The Mormons were forced to flee their homes and seek refuge in neighboring counties. The Missouri state government, rather than protecting the Mormons, largely turned a blind eye to the violence and displacement.

=== Danites and expulsion of dissenters ===
In 1836, the state congress established Caldwell County as a place for the Mormons to settle. The church relocated its main headquarters in January 1838 from Kirtland, Ohio to Far West in Caldwell County. Settlement in the area increased as thousands of Mormons poured into the new headquarters in Missouri from Kirtland and other areas. Mormons established new colonies outside of Caldwell County, including Adam-ondi-Ahman in Daviess County and De Witt in Carroll County. The Missourians saw expansion of Mormon communities outside of Caldwell County as a political and economic threat.

In June 1838, a letter, first drafted by Sidney Rigdon and signed by 83 Danites, was sent to the principal dissenters: Oliver Cowdery, David Whitmer, John Whitmer, William Wines Phelps, and Lyman E. Johnson. The letter demanded the dissenters depart the county within three days, writing:

for out of the county you shall go, and no power shall save you. And you shall have three days after you receive this communication to you, including twenty-four hours in each day, for you to depart with your families peaceably; which you may do undisturbed by any person; but in that time, if you do not depart, we will use the means in our power to cause you to depart; for go you shall.

It warned:

We have solemnly warned you, and that in the most determined manner, that if you do not cease that course of wanton abuse of the citizens of this county, that vengeance would overtake you sooner or later, and that when it did come it would be as furious as the mountain torrent, and as terrible as the beating tempest; but you have affected to despise our warnings, and pass them off with a sneer, or a grin, or a threat, and pursued your former course; and vengeance sleepeth not, neither does it slumber; and unless you heed us this time, and attend to our request, it will overtake you at an hour when you do not expect, and at a day when you do not look for it; and for you there shall be no escape; for there is but one decree for you, which is depart, depart, or a more fatal calamity shall befall you.

The letter — later known as the "Danite Manifesto" — displayed the signatures of eighty-three Mormons, including that of Joseph Smith's brother, and fellow member of the First Presidency, Hyrum, but not Joseph or Rigdon. Robinson later said that all of the signers were Danites.

The letter had the desired effect, and the few named dissenters quickly fled the county. Reed Peck asserted that "the claims by which this property was taken from these men were unjust and perhaps without foundation cannot be doubted by any unprejudiced person acquainted with all parties and circumstances."

=== Missouri war and violent expulsion ===
On August 6, 1838, in Daviess County, a brawl erupted between a group of Mormons and non-Mormon residents during election day. The perception that Mormons intended to vote as a bloc clashed with the opposition of non-Mormons who sought to prevent them from casting their ballots. Meanwhile, the siege of DeWitt unfolded in Carroll County, where a large mob of vigilantes encircled the settlement, cutting off its supplies and demanding the Mormons' departure. Outnumbered and fearing violence, the Mormons sent appeals for assistance to other Mormon communities in nearby counties. The siege ultimately ended when a state militia unit arrived, and the Mormons agreed to evacuate the town.

Hostilities culminated in 1838 when Missouri Governor Lilburn Boggs issued an executive order, commonly known as the Mormon Extermination Order. This order declared that "the Mormons must be treated as enemies, and must be exterminated or driven from the State." Just three days later, a militia unit attacked a Mormon settlement at Haun's Mill, resulting in the death of 18 Mormons.

=== Smith killed by mob in Illinois ===
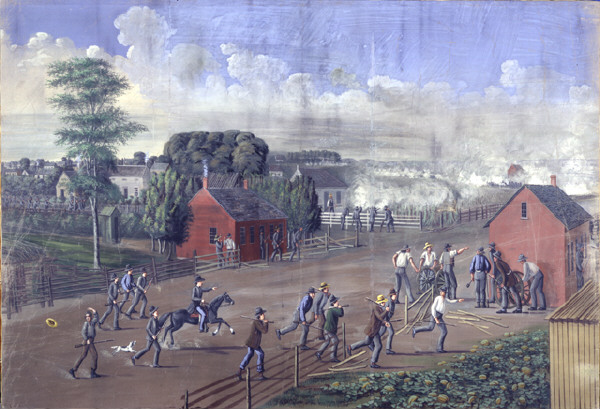
Battle of Nauvoo, by C.C.A Christensen

The conflict in Illinois was often rooted in the growing political and economic power of the Mormon community, concentrated in the city of Nauvoo. As the Mormon population expanded, non-Mormons in Hancock County, especially in the neighboring towns of Warsaw and Carthage, grew increasingly threatened by the Mormons' dominant position. Other sources of tension included Joseph Smith's practice of polygamy, Smith's opposition to slavery during his presidential campaign, and the doctrine of human deification.

Tensions boiled in 1844 following the destruction of the anti-Mormon Nauvoo Expositor newspaper press, which was condemned as a "public nuisance" by Smith and the city council. In response, the Warsaw newspaper called for a "war of extermination" against the Mormons, to be made with "powder and ball". Amid the uproar, Smith was arrested and jailed in Carthage, where he and his brother Hyrum Smith were ultimately killed by a vigilante mob. After Smith's assassination, tensions between the Mormons and their opponents in Illinois escalated, culminating in a mob of about 1000 armed vigilantes sieging Nauvoo in 1846. The Mormons eventually surrendered and were expelled from the city, crossing the Mississippi into Iowa.

In 2004, the Illinois House of Representatives unanimously passed a resolution of regret for the forced expulsion of the Mormons from Nauvoo.

=== Utah Territory and the Utah War ===
After Mormons established a community hundreds of miles away in the Salt Lake Valley in 1847, anti-Mormon activists in the Utah Territory persuaded President Buchanan that the Mormons in the territory were rebelling against the United States under the direction of Brigham Young. In response, in 1857 Buchanan sent one-third of United States's standing army to Utah in what is known as the Utah War. During the Utah War, the Mountain Meadows massacre occurred.

Historian Wallace Stegner wrote “It would be bad history to pretend that there were no holy murders in Utah and ... no mysterious disappearances of apostates". One example cited by historians occurred in March 1857, when an elderly church member of high standing, William R. Parrish, decided to leave Utah with his family when he "grew cold in the faith", but had his throat slit near his Springville, Utah home.

==== Mountain Meadows massacre ====
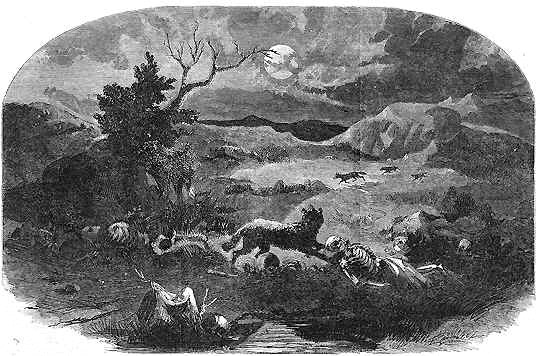
1859 depiction of the unburied corpses in the aftermath of the Mountain Meadows massacre.

On September 11, 1857 LDS settlers with the Utah Territorial Militia (officially called the Nauvoo Legion) murdered at least 120 children, women, and men, in the end sparing only seventeen young children under the age of seven. The massacre in the southern Utah Territory at Mountain Meadows was considered the largest act of domestic terrorism in United States history prior to the 1995 Oklahoma City bombing. It was perpetrated during a period of escalating tensions between Mormons and the United States which Mormons viewed from an apocalyptic lens. The victims were mostly from Arkansas, and were passing through the Utah territory on their way to California.

The massacre was influenced, in part, by unfounded rumors that some of the emigrants had previously persecuted Mormons. Leading the massacre were William H. Dame, regional church president and colonel of the Mormon militia, and his battalion leaders Isaac C. Haight (also a regional church president), John D. Lee, and John H. Higbee. The militia surrounded the emigrants and laid siege, and after forcing them to surrender, the militia systematically executed all of them except the youngest children, who were taken and adopted by nearby residents. The militia covered up the massacre by blaming it on largely uninvolved Native American tribes. Though Dame, Haight, and other leaders were indicted in the 1870s for their roles in the massacre, John D. Lee was the only participant who stood trial, where he was ultimately convicted and executed.

Brigham Young was accused of either directing the massacre or with complicity after the fact. When Young was interviewed on the matter and asked if it was related to his beliefs regarding blood atonement, he replied, "I do, and I believe that Lee has not half atoned for his great crime." He said "we believe that execution should be done by the shedding of blood instead of by hanging," but only "according to the laws of the land". American troops who visited the site later constructed a cairn at the site, topped with a sign saying "Vengeance is mine; I will repay, saith the Lord." According to a Mormon present at the event, when Young visited the site sometime afterward, he remarked "Vengeance is mine, and I have taken a little"; his party proceeded to destroy the cairn and memorial.

== Joseph Smith and violence ==
Smith was both a victim of mob violence and a defendant in several criminal proceedings involving violence or threats thereof.

Date	Incident	Location	Role	Outcome	Notes
March 24, 1832	Tarring and feathering	Hiram, Ohio	Victim	No prosecution	Smith and Sidney Rigdon were dragged from their beds, beaten, tarred and feathered by a mob. Poison was reportedly forced into Smith's mouth.
April 21, 1835	Assault and battery on Calvin Stoddard	Kirtland Township, Ohio	Defendant	Acquitted	Dispute over whether land contained water. Stoddard later testified he had forgiven Smith; judge ruled self-defense.
Fall 1836	Assault and battery on visiting minister	Kirtland, Ohio	Defendant	Complainant fled county	Smith struck a minister who had been his houseguest. After Luke Johnson swore out a counter-writ, the minister fled.
April–June 1837	Conspiracy to murder Grandison Newell	Painesville, Ohio	Defendant	Discharged	Newell alleged Smith had threatened his life. Judge found no cause to fear and discharged Smith.
August 8, 1838	Threatening Justice Adam Black	Daviess County, Missouri	Defendant	Indicted; fled state	Smith led over 100 armed men to Black's home and demanded he sign a statement disavowing anti-Mormon vigilantes. Later indicted for riot; escaped custody in April 1839.
May 6, 1842	Attempted assassination of Lilburn Boggs	Nauvoo, Illinois	Defendant	Extradition denied	Former Missouri governor Boggs was shot through a window. Smith was accused of conspiracy. Extradition request ruled invalid by federal judge for lack of evidence.
August 1, 1843	Assault and battery on Walter Bagby	Nauvoo, Illinois	Defendant	Found guilty	Dispute over property taxes. Smith held Hancock County assessor Bagby after he allegedly tried to grab a rock, and struck him several times. Bagby later helped organize the Anti-Mormon Party.
June 27, 1844	Killed by mob in Carthage	Carthage, Illinois	Victim	No prosecution	Smith was shot and killed by a mob while in state custody awaiting trial. His brother Hyrum was also killed. See History of Nauvoo, Illinois#Growing hostility towards Mormons.

== Lists of acts of violence involving Mormons ==
=== Wars and massacres in the 1800s ===
This list of acts of violence includes some wars and massacres in the 1800s in which Mormons played a significant role on either side of the conflicts.

Name	Date	Location	Deaths	Part of	Description
Battle near the Blue River	November 4, 1833	Jackson County, Missouri	1 Mormon, 2 non-Mormons	Expulsion of Mormons from Jackson County, Missouri	Skirmish after several Missourians captured a Mormon ferry on the Big Blue River. Mormons were subsequently forcefully expelled from Jackson County.
Siege of DeWitt	October 1-11, 1838	DeWitt, Carroll County, Missouri	~2 Mormons	1838 Mormon War	Siege and forced expulsion of Mormon settlers from DeWitt by vigilantes and a rogue regional militia.
Battle of Crooked River	October 25, 1838	Ray County, Missouri	3 Mormons, 1 Missourian	1838 Mormon War	Skirmish between Missouri state militia and a Mormon militia. Mormon apostle David Patten was among those killed.
Haun's Mill massacre	October 30, 1838	Haun's Mill, Caldwell County, Missouri	17–18 Mormons	1838 Mormon War	Attack on a Mormon settlement by a rogue militia, killing at least 17 men and boys.
Mormon War in Illinois	1844–46	Nauvoo, Illinois	~10 Mormons (including Joseph & Hyrum Smith)		Siege of Nauvoo and vigiliantism preceding the Mormon Exodus.
Battle Creek massacre	1849	Battle Creek (Pleasant Grove, Utah)	4+ Timpanogos people		Attack on an encampment of Timpanogos families after they took some Mormon cattle.
Provo River massacre	1850	Provo, Utah	40–100 Timpanogos people, 1 Mormon		Mormon settlers laid siege to an encampment of Timpanogos families on the Provo River, and executed men who surrendered.
William McBride Massacre	1851	Skull Valley, Utah	9 Goshute people		Captain William McBride attacked a Goshute camp after they took some cattle.
Porter Rockwell Massacre	April 1851	Skull Valley, Utah	4–5 Ute people		In an attempt to find a group of horse thieves, Captain Porter Rockwell took 30 uninvolved Ute people prisoner. Later most escaped, but 4–5 were executed.
Walker War	1853	Utah	12 LDS people, ~12 Native Americans		Series of battles between Mormon settlers and various indigenous tribes led by Walkara.
Nephi massacre	1853	Nephi, Utah	7 Goshute men	Walker War	Eight uninvolved Western Shoshone men were murdered in retaliation for the deaths of four Mormons at the hands of some Ute men.
Mountain Meadows Massacre	September 11, 1857	Mountain Meadow, Utah	~120 non-LDS travelers	Utah War	Nauvoo Legion laid siege to the Baker–Fancher emigrant wagon train, then slaughtered all children over 6, women, and men when they surrendered.
Aiken massacre	1857	Central Utah	5 non-LDS travelers	Utah War	Lynching of five Californian travelers reportedly at the orders of top leaders. One of the party of six escaped.
Utah War	1857–1858	Utah	Some non-Mormon civilians		American troops sent into Utah following rumors of a Mormon rebellion.
Morrisite War	1862	Kington Fort	10 Morrisite Mormons, 1 Utah militiaman		Battle between the Church of the Firstborn (Morrisite) and the Utah Territorial Militia.
Black Hawk War (Utah)	1865–72	Utah	140 Native Americans, ~70 LDS people		Series of battles led by Black Hawk involving various indigenous tribes.
Circleville Massacre	1866	Circleville, Utah	~30 Paiute children, women, and men	Black Hawk War	Circleville residents captured and executed Paiute families as tensions in the Black Hawk War escalated.
Cane Creek Massacre	August 10, 1884	Lewis County, Tennessee	4 LDS people, 1 attacker		A masked mob attacked a farm during a Sunday worship service and murdered four LDS members, including two missionaries.

=== Acts of violence involving Mormon fundamentalists in the 1900s and 2000s ===
This list includes modern instances of violence in which Mormons have played a significant role on either side of the conflicts.

Date	Location	Name	Deaths	Description
1972—1977	Sonora, Mexico	Ervil LeBaron murders	Several people	Church leader Ervil LeBaron of the Church of the First Born of the Lamb of God orchestrated the murder of several apostates.
July 24, 1984	American Fork, Utah	Lafferty murders	2 people	Fundamentalist Mormons Ron and Dan Lafferty under the direction of a purported revelation from God murdered their sister-in-law Brenda Lafferty and her child.
January 28, 1988	Marion, Utah	Singer–Swapp standoff	1 law enforcement officer	Mormon fundamentalist Addam Swapp and eight followers bombed an LDS church on January 16th and were then in a 13-day standoff with law enforcement in order to fulfill Swapp's revelation that his father-in-law John Singer would be resurrected after the battle. Singer, also a polygamist, had died in a shootout with police 9 years earlier. One officer was shot by John's son and others were wounded.
June 27, 1988	Texas	4 O'Clock murders	4 people	Ervil's successor Heber LeBaron of the Church of the Firstborn led the murder of four apostates.
November 4, 2019	Sonora, Mexico	LeBarón family massacre	9 Mormons	Mexican cartel members ambushed three vehicles of Mormon families headed to a wedding.

== Mormon theological views on violence ==
=== Mormon views on capital punishment ===
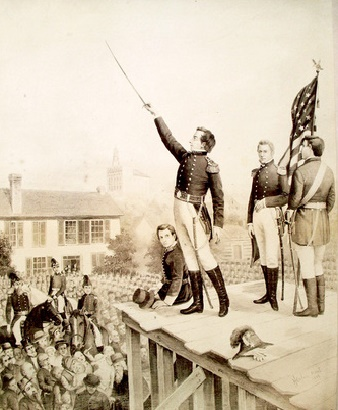
Joseph Smith did not teach blood atonement, but taught a "blood for blood" law of God's retribution, stating that if he could enact a death penalty law, "I am opposed to hanging, even if a man kill another, I will shoot him, or cut off his head, spill his blood on the ground and let the smoke ascend thereof up to God. ... "

Religious justification for capital punishment is not unique to Mormons. Joseph Smith, the founder of the Latter Day Saint movement, was a strong proponent of capital punishment, and he favored execution methods that involved the shedding of blood as retribution for crimes of bloodshed. In 1843, he or his scribe commented that the common execution method in Christian nations was hanging, "instead of blood for blood according to the law of heaven." In 1838 Smith stated Judas Iscariot was executed or "hung by Peter" rather than died by suicide. In a March 4, 1843, debate with church leader George A. Smith, who argued against capital punishment, (Note: George A. Smith later changed his views on capital punishment, and would write the first code in Utah which allowed both execution by firing squad and decapitation.) Smith said that day if he ever had the opportunity to enact a death penalty law, he "was opposed to hanging" the convict; rather, he would "shoot him, or cut off his head, spill his blood on the ground, and let the smoke thereof ascend up to God." In the church's April 6, 1843, general conference, Smith said he would "wring a thief's neck off if I can find him. if I cannot bring him to justice any other way."

Sidney Rigdon, Smith's counselor in the First Presidency, also supported capital punishment involving the spilling of blood, stating, "There are men standing in your midst that you can't do anything with them but cut their throat & bury them." Smith was willing to tolerate the presence of men "as corrupt as the devil himself" in Nauvoo, Illinois, who "had been guilty of murder and robbery," in the chance that they might "come to the waters of baptism through repentance, and redeem a part of their allotted time". Despite Smith's endorsements of capital punishment in March 1843, there is no evidence he ever authorized such punishment in Nauvoo, though his follower Robert D. Foster beheaded a man in near there in November 1843. In 1844 Smith was killed by a mob in a shootout, during which Smith wounded three with a six-shooter.

Brigham Young, Smith's successor in the LDS Church, initially held views on capital punishment that were similar to those of Smith. On January 27, 1845, he spoke approvingly of Smith's toleration of "corrupt men" in Nauvoo who were guilty of murder and robbery on the chance that they might repent and be baptized. On the other hand, on February 25, 1846, after the Saints had left Nauvoo, Young threatened adherents who had stolen wagon cover strings and rail timber with having their throats cut "when they get out of the settlements where his orders could be executed". Later that year, Young gave orders that "when a man is found to be a thief, ... cut his throat & throw him in the River." Young also stated that the decapitation of repeated sinners "is the law of God & it shall be executed."

In the Salt Lake Valley, Young acted as the executive authority while the Council of Fifty acted as a legislature. One of his main concerns in the early Mormon settlement was theft, and he swore that "a thief should not live in the Valley, for he would cut off their heads or be the means of haveing [sic] it done as the Lord lived." A Mormon listening to one of Young's sermons in 1849 recorded that he said that "if any one was catched [sic] stealing[,] to shoot them dead on the spot and [the shooter] should not be hurt for it."

In the Utah Territory, there was a law from 1851 to 1888 that allowed persons who were convicted of murder to be executed by decapitation; during that time, no person was executed by that method.

==== Blood atonement ====
"Blood atonement" is the controversial concept that there are certain sins to which the atonement of Jesus does not apply, and before a Mormon who has committed such sins can achieve the highest degree of salvation, he or she must personally atone for the sin by "hav[ing] their blood spilt upon the ground, that the smoke thereof might ascend to heaven as an offering for their sins". Blood atonement was supposed to be voluntarily practiced by the sinner, or it was contemplated as being mandatory in a theoretical theocracy which was planned for the Utah Territory, but it was supposed to be carried out with love and compassion for the sinner, not out of a desire for vengeance. The concept was first taught in the mid-1850s by the First Presidency of the LDS Church during the Mormon Reformation, when Brigham Young governed the Utah Territory as a near-theocracy. Even though there was discussion about implementing the doctrine, there is no direct evidence that it was ever practiced by the Mormon leadership in their capacity as the leaders of both church and state. There is inconclusive evidence, however, to suggest that the doctrine was independently enforced a few times by Mormon individuals. Scholars have also argued that the doctrine contributed to a culture of violence, which, combined with paranoia that resulted from the church's long history of being persecuted, incited over a hundred extrajudicial killings by Mormons, including the Mountain Meadows Massacre. According to some scholars, "the tough talk about blood atonement and dissenters must have created a climate of violence in the [Utah] territory, especially among those who chose to take license from it."

LDS Church leaders taught the concept of blood atonement well into the 20th century within the context of government-sanctioned capital punishment, and it was responsible for laws in the state of Utah that allowed prisoners on death row to be executed by firing squad (Salt Lake Tribune, 11 May 1994, p. D1). Although the LDS Church repudiated the teaching in 1978, it still has adherents within the LDS Church as well as adherents within Mormon fundamentalism, a schismatic branch of the Latter Day Saint movement whose adherents seek to follow early Mormon teachings to the letter. Despite its repudiation by the LDS Church, the concept also survives in Mormon culture, particularly with regard to capital crimes. In 1994, when the defense in the trial of James Edward Wood alleged that a local church leader had "talked to [Wood] about shedding his own blood," the LDS Church's First Presidency submitted a document to the court that denied the church's acceptance and practice of such a doctrine, and included the 1978 repudiation.

=== Discussions involving violence in temple ceremonies ===
The Mormon temple endowment ceremony used to contain discussions of violence. Author and former Brigham Young University (BYU) professor Brian Evenson stated "any book that spoke in any detail about the relationship of Mormon culture to violence needed to acknowledge the connection of the temple ceremony to violence."

==== Temple penalties ====
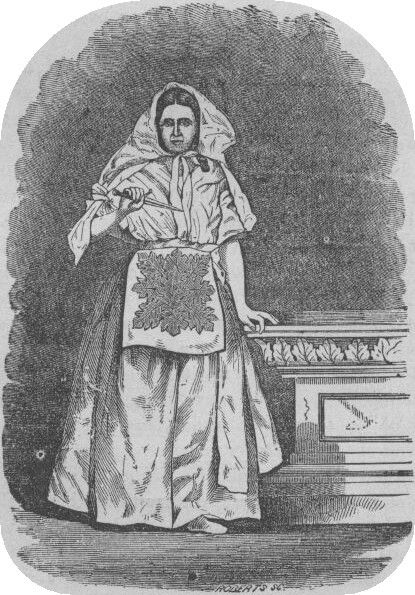
Woman in temple clothing circa the 1870s, depicted with a knife symbolically referenced in the penalty to allow ones body to "be cut asunder and all your bowels gush out.

In Mormonism, a penalty is a specified punishment for breaking an oath of secrecy after receiving the Nauvoo endowment ceremony. Adherents promised they would submit to execution in specific ways should they reveal certain contents of the ceremony. In the ceremony participants each symbolically enacted three of the methods of their execution: throat slitting, heart removal, and disembowelment. These penalties were first instituted by Joseph Smith in 1842, and further developed by Brigham Young after Smith's death. They were changed to a reference to "different ways in which life may be taken". The entire "penalty" portion of the ceremony was removed by the LDS Church in 1990.

Writer J. Aaron Sanders stated that the temple penalties were a form of blood atonement. Author Peter Levenda linked Smith's introduction of the Masonic blood oaths into the temple endowment as a step towards later threats of blood atonement for other perceived crimes in Utah territory. Historian Juanita Brooks stated that violent enforcement of religious oaths was a "literal and terrible reality" advocated by Brigham Young "without compromise".

==== Oath of vengeance ====
After the death of Joseph Smith, Brigham Young added an oath of vengeance to the Nauvoo endowment ritual. Participants in the ritual made an oath to pray that God would "avenge the blood of the prophets on this nation". "The prophets" were Joseph and Hyrum Smith, and "this nation" was the United States. The oath was removed from the ceremony during the 1920s.

In 1877, Young stated what he viewed as a similarity between Smith's death and the blood atonement doctrine in that "whether we believe in blood atonement or not," Smith and other prophets "sealed their testimony with their blood."

=== Violence in Mormon scripture ===
War is a central, cyclical theme in the Book of Mormon. There are many wars mentioned in the Book of Mormon, depicted as the consequence of prideful or sinful behavior. Battles often occur between two peoples called the Nephites and Lamanites, but other groups attacked or drawn into battle include "secret combinations" (i.e., organized criminals), factions among the Jaredites.

The Book of Mormon concludes with a cataclysmic war between the Nephites and Lamanites. The final prophet of the Book of Mormon, a Nephite named Moroni, laments that his people have participated in sexual violence, torture, and cannibalism:

And notwithstanding this great abomination of the Lamanites, it doth not exceed that of our people in Moriantum. For behold, many of the daughters of the Lamanites have they taken prisoners; and after depriving them of that which was most dear and precious above all things, which is chastity and virtue—And after they had done this thing, they did murder them in a most cruel manner, torturing their bodies even unto death; and after they have done this, they devour their flesh like unto wild beasts, because of the hardness of their hearts; and they do it for a token of bravery.

Several decapitations and dismemberments are also described in the Book of Mormon. In chapter 4 of the First Book of Nephi, the prophet Nephi is commanded by the Spirit to kill a man named Laban, whom he decapitates. In Ether chapter 15, the warrior Coriantumr, who is the last survivor of the Jaredites, decapitates Shiz. In Alma chapter 17, Ammon (a Nephite missionary) defends a Lamanite king's livestock by cutting off the arms of several thieves and killing several others with a sling.

In chapter 9 of the Third Book of Nephi, Christ announces to ancient Americans that he has destroyed more than a dozen cities and their inhabitants due to their corruption. He announces that he destroyed some cities by causing them "to be burned with fire because of their sins and their wickedness", while others were "sunk in the depths of the sea" or "covered with earth". The text reports that some of the victims mourned, "O that we had repented before this great and terrible day, and had not killed and stoned the prophets, and cast them out; then would our mothers and our fair daughters, and our children have been spared".

== Violence related to LGBTQ people ==
In October 1976, LDS Church apostle Boyd K. Packer gave a sermon, "To Young Men Only," in which he said a missionary had told him of his companion enticing the other missionary to "join [him] in immoral acts". The missionary punched his companion so hard he fell to the floor, to which Packer responded resulting in audience laughter, "thanks. Somebody had to do it". Historian D. Michael Quinn criticized Packer's comments, saying they constituted an endorsement of gay bashing; he also argued that the church endorses such behavior by continuing to publish Packer's speech. Others criticized the pamphlet as well.

On July 5, 2015, the LDS Church issued an official statement in response to the Supreme Court ruling on same-sex marriage. The statement said that proponents of same-sex marriage should be treated with civility and not disrespectfully. On August 23, 2021, in a controversial address to faculty and staff at BYU, apostle Jeffrey R. Holland called for "a little more musket fire from this temple of learning" in "defending marriage as the union of a man and a woman."

== Far-right movements ==
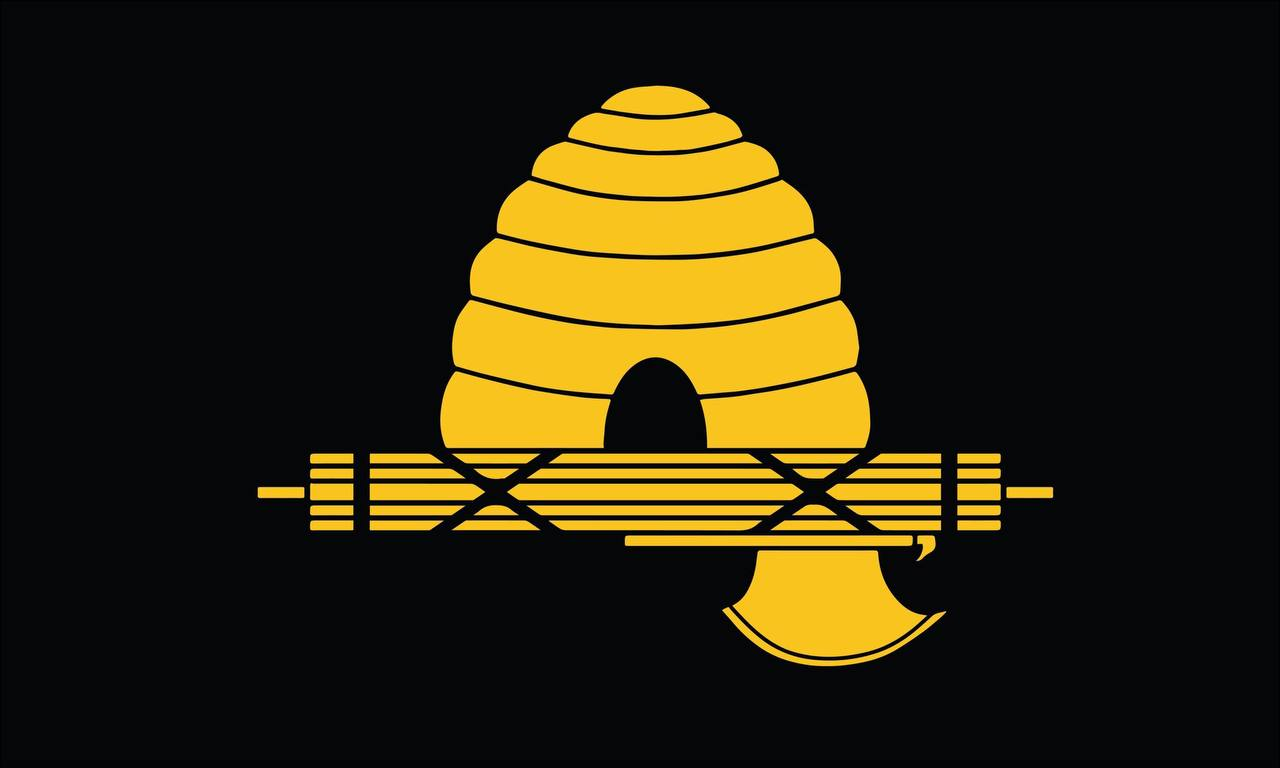
Left: A Utah beehive crossed with an Italian fasces.
Right: Original flag of the proposed State of Deseret

Deseret Nationalism, popularized online as #DezNat, is a Mormon nationalist movement in the United States known for its association with alt-right rhetoric. It originated in 2018 following the Unite the Right rally by Logan Smith, a member of the Church of Jesus Christ of Latter-day Saints, known as "JP Bellum" on Twitter. While the term originated as a Twitter hashtag, collecting upwards of 114,000 original posts, its significance goes beyond social media. DezNat represents a loosely affiliated group of LDS Church members who share common ideals and values, despite the church's negative stance on the concept.

The Daily Beast and The Daily Utah Chronicle have both described DezNat as an extremist, alt-right, white nationalist movement. The Guardian said the group was right-wing, with elements of far-right politics and eugenics. Social scientist Spencer Greenhalgh, speaking with The Salt Lake Tribune, described it as having "far-right influences". DezNat participants have typically said they only intend to organize orthodox Latter-day Saints and defend the church against critics. Users of the hashtag say they are not alt-right but are simply unapologetic about their beliefs. Spencer Greenhalgh and Amy Chapman say this framing is "disingenuous", describing the movement as existing in an online affinity space with red pill communities.

Some within the DezNat community have advocated for the restoration of the historical State of Deseret as an independent nation outside of U.S. jurisdiction. As well as the secession of a theocratic Mormon state, some DezNat commentators have suggested this should be a white ethnostate, using neo-Nazi and far-right accelerationist imagery. Logan Smith says the hashtag recognizes faithful LDS Church members as "a unique people and should be united spiritually, morally, economically, and politically behind Christ, the prophet, and the church", adding that DezNat "is the idea that devout members ought to work together to support the church, its doctrines, and each other on social media and in their communities to further build the Kingdom of God".

The community has been criticized for promoting bigotry and harassment against members of the LGBTQ community, non-Mormons and ex-Mormons, feminists, abortion-rights advocates, and pornographic film actors. Some have criticized the Mormon blog By Common Consent for being too politically progressive. Members also use bowie knife imagery as an homage to Brigham Young. Controversially, some within DezNat advocate for violent actions under the pretext of blood atonement for certain sins. According to the feminist writer Mary Ann Clements, DezNat proponents regard themselves as being in line with the actions of former church presidents, therefore not supporting polygamy today but referencing it regarding the past (e.g., by portraying Young as a polygamous "chad" or powerful "alpha male").

== See also ==
- Act in Relation to Service
- Act for the relief of Indian Slaves
- Antisemitism
- Christianity and other religions
- Christianity and violence
- Criticism of the LDS Church
- Gladdenites (Attempted move to Utah)
- Honor killing
- Islam and other religions
- Islam and violence
- Islamophobia
- Jewish religious movements
- Jewish schisms
- Jewish views on religious pluralism
- Judaism and violence
- Latter Day Saint martyrs
- Mormon Battalion
- Pace memorandum
- Persecution of Christians
- Persecution of Jews
- Persecution of minority Muslim groups
- Persecution of Muslims
- Religious fanaticism
- Religious discrimination
- Religious discrimination in the US
- Religious intolerance
- Religious persecution
- Religious segregation
- Religious terrorism
- Religious violence
- Right-wing terrorism
- Sectarian violence
- Sectarian violence among Christians
- Sectarian violence among Muslims
- Utah in the American Civil War
- Latter-day Saints Militias and Military Units
- Violence in the Quran
- War in the Hebrew Bible
