= Gregory K. Orme =

American judge

Gregory Keith Orme

Judge of the Utah Court of Appeals
- Incumbent
- Assumed office January 18, 1987
- Appointed by: Norman H. Bangerter

Personal details
- Born: December 14, 1953 (age 72) Boston, Massachusetts
- Education: University of Utah; George Washington University

Gregory Keith Orme (born December 14, 1953) is one of the seven judges serving on the Utah Court of Appeals.

== Early life and education ==
Orme was born December 14, 1953, in Boston, Massachusetts. Orme grew up in Ogden, Utah, and later attended Robert E. Lee High School in San Antonio, Texas. He graduated from the University of Utah in 1975 with a degree in Political Science and a Certificate in International Relations. He then attended law school at George Washington University. While in Washington, D.C., Orme worked for the United States Agency for International Development in the Office of General Counsel. He received his Juris Doctor, with high honors, in 1978.

== Early legal career ==
After graduating law school, Orme began working at the Salt Lake City law firm of Van Cott, Bagley, Cornwall and McCarthy in the Summer of 1978. In September 1978, he took a leave of absence to serve as a law clerk under Judge Monroe G. McKay, a Federal Appeals Court Judge on the United States Court of Appeals for the Tenth Circuit.

In August 1979 Orme finished his clerkship and returned to work at Van Cott. He worked primarily in commercial litigation, handling cases for clients such as Deer Valley Resort, Jackson Hole Ski Corporation, Huntsman Chemical, and KeyBank. Orme was made a partner at the firm in 1984. He was a recipient of the Utah State Bar's Young Lawyer of the Year award in 1986.

== Nomination and appointment ==
In 1984, voters approved an amendment to Article VIII of the Utah State Constitution. Following this amendment, a task force was created to develop solutions to many of the problems facing the judiciary. The Utah Court of Appeals was conceived to address the burdensome delays in the appellate process.

In late 1986, Orme applied for a position on the soon to be formed court. He was one of seven selected by Governor Norman H. Bangerter from the 21 names forwarded to him by the state's Judicial Nominating Commission. Orme was confirmed by the State Senate and was sworn in by Chief Justice of the Utah Supreme Court, Gordon R. Hall, on January 18, 1987. Judge Orme and the other six original members of the court then began to handle both cases that had been waiting for years to be argued, as well as new appeals from trial courts and administrative agencies.

In a 2007 article in the Utah Bar Journal, Orme gave his perspective on the twenty-year history of the Court of Appeals, and the difficulties surmounted in developing an efficient appellate system for the state of Utah.

== Judicial career ==
Judge Orme served as Presiding Judge for the Court of Appeals from 1995-1996. He was elected to the Judicial Council representing the Court of Appeals in 1986 and served two terms. He served six years on the Ethics Advisory Committee, and ten years on the Judicial Performance Evaluation Committee.

Orme is the judicial advisor to the Utah Bar Journal and has made numerous written contributions to it, particularly with regard to professionalism and the behavior expected of lawyers. He is also a member of the executive committee of the Utah State Bar's Appellate Practice Section. He was made a fellow of the American Bar Foundation in 2005. In 2007, he received the Utah Bar's Judge of the Year award.

Having been elected in 2007 and again in 2010, he again sits on the Judicial Council as the Court of Appeals representative. He also serves on the Utah Supreme Court's Advisory Committee on the Rules of Appellate Procedure, the Advisory Committee on Professionalism (formed in 2002) and the Utah Sentencing Commission. He is the only original member of the court who still serves on it.

=== Significant opinions ===
In re M.B., 198 P.3d 1007 (UT Ct. App. 2008)

M. B. was convicted of the crimes of vehicular burglary, theft, and unlawful possession of burglary tools. He appealed his convictions which grew out of a 2007 incident in which two men broke into a truck and stole the stereo and compact discs inside. At that time M.B. was sitting in the getaway vehicle across the street from the driveway the truck was parked in. The owner of the truck awoke to see the men exiting the car with the stereo and saw M.B. sitting in the getaway car. The police were notified and the men were caught a short time later. M.B. argued that his conviction should be overturned because no evidence was submitted that implicated M.B. as actively encouraging or intentionally aiding the two men in the commission of the crime. M.B.'s counsel also argued that the charge of unlawful possession of burglary tools should be dismissed because they were located within the vehicle, and since the vehicle had other occupants, there was reasonable doubt as to whether M.B. constructively possessed the screwdriver and gloves found inside the getaway vehicle. The Court of Appeals reversed the trial court's decision.

B.A.M. v. Salt Lake County, 87 P.3d 710 (UT Ct. App. 2004)

B.A.M. had dedicated a plot of land to be developed, and the Salt Lake County Planning and Zoning Commission approved the preliminary plans. However, a year later, the Commission demanded an additional 13 feet of land to be dedicated to the subdivision to make room for future road expansion. The plaintiff objected to this new demand as an unconstitutional taking without compensation by the government. Plaintiff sued in district court and lost, and then appealed. The court of appeals found the trial court to be in error, and reversed and remanded the prior decision. Judge Orme wrote a dissenting opinion in this case. Orme argued that because the Zoning Commission was not a judicial body, and no record was created, the trial court did in fact have authority to take evidence and call witnesses, contrary to the majority opinion. He then further argued that the imposition of an additional 13-foot dedication of land was in fact an unconstitutional taking and the plaintiff was entitled to just compensation. In the final paragraph, Judge Orme criticized the plaintiff's counsel's use of exaggerated punctuation in the submitted brief. This comment won attention from the press and was mentioned in the New York Times. This case was granted writ of certiorari to the Utah Supreme Court, which, in a manner almost entirely consistent with Judge Orme's dissent, affirmed the court of appeals decision in part while reversing in part."

State v. Chavez, 41 P.3d 1137 (UT Ct. App. 2002)

Chavez was convicted of attempted rape of a child based on the testimony of the victim and another witness, Joseph Young. Young gave testimony that Chavez confessed to the crime while they were both in jail. In cross examination, defense counsel discovered that Young was already incarcerated, was a Drug Enforcement Administration informant at the time, and had served as a police informant at least twenty times prior to this occasion. He was also convicted of numerous felonies involving dishonesty. The trial court prohibited the defense from asking any questions about his current incarceration or about his work for the DEA. The appellant argued that allowing the witness to testify while restricting the questions that the defense could ask was a violation of the constitutional right to confront one's accusers. Judge Orme wrote the unanimous opinion for the court. The court determined that because the prosecution had no physical evidence to prove the crime, and relied solely on the testimony of the witnesses, the credibility of the witnesses had to be examined. Because the victim gave inconsistent statements to police and to the court, Young's testimony may have been the integral component in convicting Chavez. The restriction on cross-examination of Young was ruled to be prejudicial and the Court of Appeals reversed the conviction and remanded for a new trial.

State v. Wanosik, 31 P3d 615 (UT Ct. App. 2001)

Wanosik pleaded guilty to two misdemeanor drug offenses, but failed to appear at sentencing. He filed an appeal arguing that the sentencing should not have taken place in his absence and that the trial court erred in sentencing him. The Court of Appeals ruled that Wanosik had no basis to expect the trial court not to proceed in his absence after the court had informed him of the date and time of sentencing. However, the trial court did fail to hear any information relevant to sentencing from either the defense counsel or the prosecutor, and therefore violated Wanosik's Due Process rights in failing to base its sentencing decisions on information presented to it. The Court of Appeals vacated the sentences, and remanded for resentencing. The state appealed to the Supreme Court, which affirmed the Court of Appeals decision.

State v. Singer, 815 P.2d 1303 (UT Ct. App. 1991)

John Timothy Singer, son of John Singer, was convicted of manslaughter in the killing of Lt. Fred House of the Utah Department of Corrections. Singer appealed with a claim that evidence against him only supported a conviction of the lesser offense of negligent homicide, as well as that his Fifth Amendment rights had been violated by the officers who had arrested him. Singer argued that he had been firing in the direction of the police dogs, and had not intended to strike the human handler. Evidence from the siege of the Singer residence indicated that during the thirteen-day ordeal, it would have become very obvious to Singer that officers were present and had taken up positions in nearby residences. The court ruled that the jury's determination that Singer had acted recklessly in firing his rifle was correct, and affirmed the conviction for manslaughter. The second argument was that the arresting officers had behaved in a manipulative fashion to elicit incriminating statements from Singer once he was in custody. After being taken into custody, he was driven by two Federal ATF agents to Salt Lake City. He had signed a waiver that he understood his rights, and as he was being questioned, he expressed his desire to not discuss the siege or the bombing for which his brother-in-law, Addam Swapp, was responsible. The agents ceased questioning him and began discussing between themselves their families and desires to return home after the long assignment. Singer then joined the conversation and offered details about his own family and the agents resumed questioning him without restating his Miranda rights. The argument that the agents had begun discussing their families to exploit a weakness in Singer was rejected by the court, which found that the discussion between the agents was not unusual after both had spent a long time away from their homes in different states. The Court of Appeals affirmed the trial court's denial of the motion to suppress Singer's testimony.
