= Anne Wilde =

Anne B. Wilde

Personal details
- Born: 1936; Detroit, Michigan
- Home town: Taft, California
- Baptism Date: Circa 1944
- Known For: Editing Fundamentalist Mormon texts
- Alma mater: Brigham Young University
- Organization: Principle Voices (founded 2000)
- Notable works: Voices in Harmony
- Spouse(s): Ted Wilde (divorced); Ogden Kraut (m. 1969)

Anne B. Wilde is an American author and advocate on behalf of fundamentalist Mormon polygamists. She is a co-founder of Principle Voices, a group whose purpose is to counter anti-polygamy messages, build bridges between fundamentalist Mormon groups and outside communities, and for the decriminalization of polygamy.

Wilde is the second wife of Ogden Kraut, a prolific writer on fundamentalist Mormon history topics and doctrines. They married in 1969 while members of the Church of Jesus Christ of Latter-day Saints (LDS Church). Kraut was excommunicated in 1972, but Wilde was able to keep her marriage to Kraut a secret for many decades. She was excommunicated sometime after 2002 and speaks on behalf of polygamists. She is a co-author of Voices in Harmony: Contemporary Women Celebrate Plural Marriage.

== Biography ==
Wilde was born in Detroit, Michigan. Her mother was a member of the LDS Church with pioneer ancestry, and her father was a non-Mormon who worked in the film industry.

== Activism ==
"We thought maybe by organizing, we'd have a little more credibility[...] We could also provide an avenue for those in our culture to speak up." —Anne Wilde

Wilde, Mary Batchelor, Marianne Watson, and Linda Kelsch founded Principle Voices in 2000 after the publication of Voices in Harmony. The group sought to bring together all of the area's polygamous communities into a coalition.

== Works ==
Wilde edited 65 books and other publications with Ogden Kraut. She ran a publishing house from her home.

Wilde authored the chapter on fundamentalist Mormonism in a book about schism within Mormonism.
