= Salem Lake (Utah) =

Reservoir in Salem, Utah, United States

Coordinates: 40.051°N 111.675°W

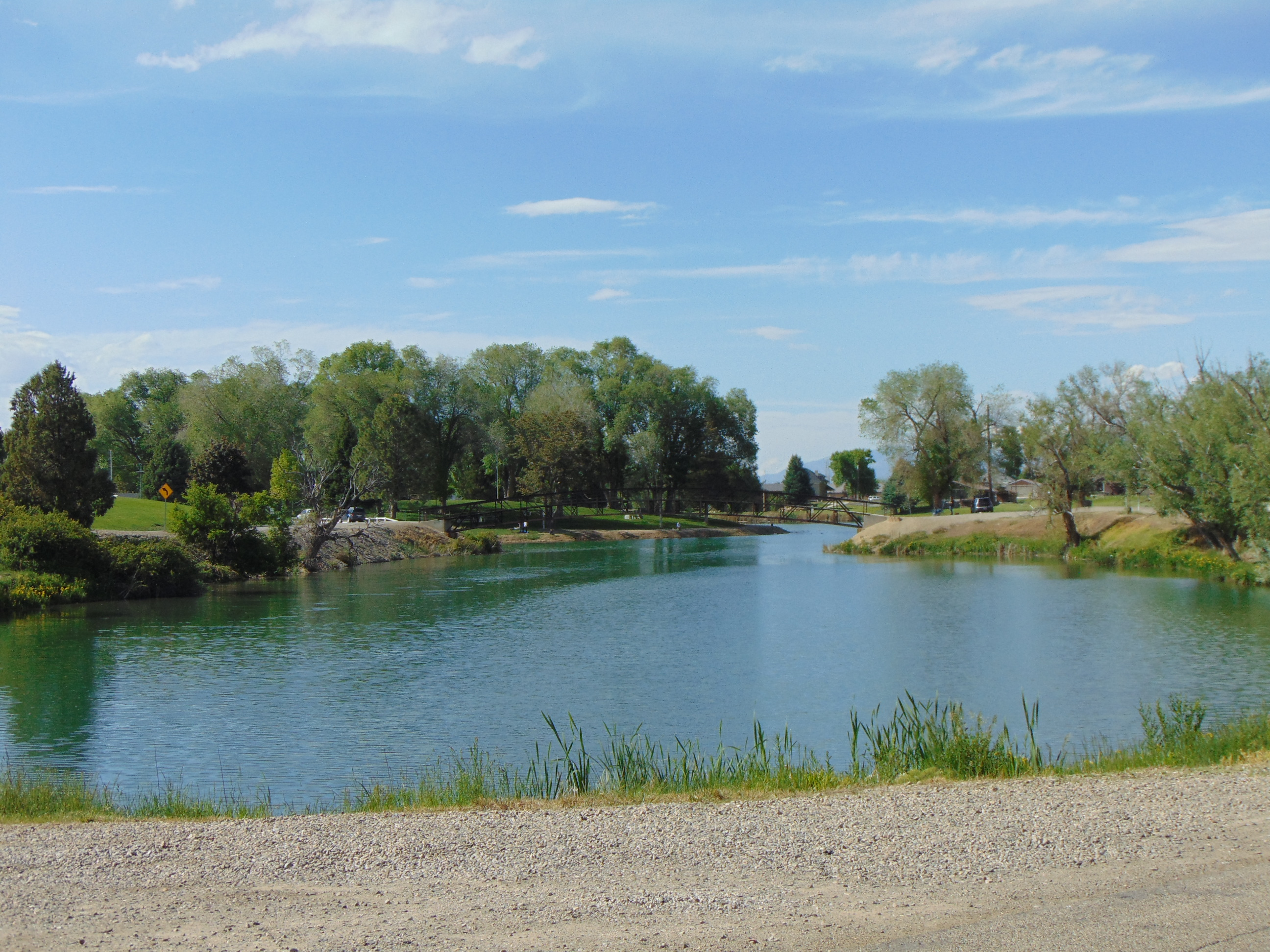
Salem Pond

Salem Lake, locally known as Salem Pond, is an 11-acre (4.5 ha) reservoir located in Salem, Utah, United States.

== Description ==
The reservoir was originally created by placing a dam on a spring in 1851. The city of Salem was created by settlers creating a fort along this body of water.

The following fish are found in Salem Lake: rainbow trout, channel catfish, largemouth bass, bluegill, and grass carp. The average depth is seven feet.

The beaches are mostly sandy as are the shallow areas.

== See also ==
- List of dams and reservoirs in Utah
