= Dream Mine =

Mine in Utah County, Utah, United States

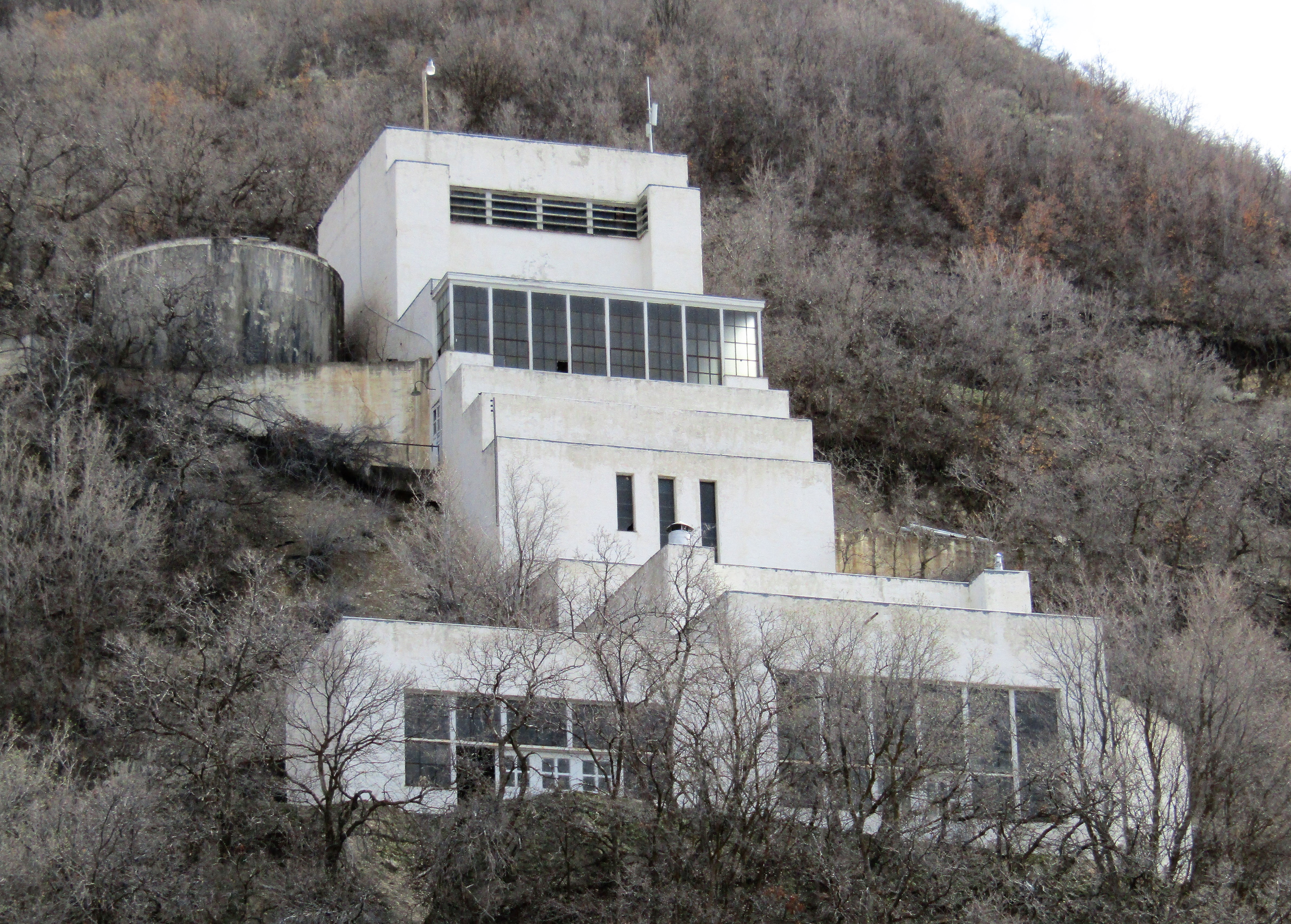
- The Dream Mine's ore processing mill in 2017

- Location within Utah

Location
- Location: Near Salem, Utah County, Utah, United States; 40°02′54″N 111°37′40″W

Production
- Type: Underground

History
- Opened: 1894

Owner
- Company: Relief Mine Company
- Website: ReliefMine.com
- Acquired: 1962

The Dream Mine, or Relief Mine, is an unproductive underground mine in Salem, Utah, built by John Hyrum Koyle in the 1890s and incorporated in 1909. Koyle prophesied the mine would provide financial support for members of the Church of Jesus Christ of Latter-day Saints (LDS Church) just before the Second Coming of Jesus Christ. Koyle's prophecies were controversial among leaders of the LDS Church, who excommunicated him in 1948.

Koyle died in 1949 and work on the Dream Mine ended in the 1960s. Koyle's followers, known as "Dream Miners," have continued to maintain the mine and to trade stock in it as of 2016. Although the mine has not yet produced any valuable metals, Dream Miners believe it will produce gold before the Second Coming, and that Koyle's other prophecies will be fulfilled.

== Background ==
=== John Hyrum Koyle ===
John Koyle was born in Spanish Fork, Utah, on August 14, 1864, to John Hyrum Koyle Sr. and Adlinda Hillman. In 1886, he dreamed that an angel told him he would find a lost cow in a field that had an injured horn which poked its own eye. That morning he reportedly saw the injured cow, just as the dream had told him, strengthening his belief in the restored gospel of the LDS Church. Historian Kevin Cantera compared the Dream Miners' views of this experience with traditional LDS views of Joseph Smith's First Vision.

Koyle served as a missionary in the Southern States Mission from 1888 to 1891, where he became known for his prophetic dreams. On August 27, 1894, he reportedly had a dream in which the Angel Moroni brought him to a Nephite mine on a nearby mountain, showing him nine caverns full of treasures buried by the Nephites, including the sword of Laban, the Urim and Thummim, and the golden plates. The angel instructed him to reopen this mine and dig new tunnels, and said that it would provide financial aid during an economic collapse. The angel also told him that the mine's gold would help provide financial relief for the LDS Church, and fund the gathering of Israel in the last days.

=== Historical setting ===
During Koyle's lifetime, the LDS Church moved more into America's religious mainstream, starting with the 1890 Manifesto and the Reed Smoot hearings, both of which dealt with the practice of polygamy. In the 1900s, church leaders started emphasizing Joseph Smith's First Vision, focusing less on his mystical worldview and early treasure hunting activities.

American historian D. Michael Quinn viewed the Dream Mine as a product of early Mormonism's magical worldview, a result of Joseph Smith's "superstitious and schismatic" practices. Quinn viewed the LDS Church's opposition of the mine as a rejection of this worldview. American folklorist Wayland Hand wrote that Koyle might have been influenced by the LDS Church's financial situation during the 1889–1898 leadership of Wilford Woodruff. At the time of the mine's construction, the LDS Church was financially struggling due in part to anti-polygamy legislation passed in the 1880s and also due to taking on large debts for infrastructure development. Koyle may have envisioned that the Dream Mine would rescue the church from its contemporary financial problems.

== History ==
=== Construction and incorporation ===
On September 17, 1894, Koyle and five friends started excavating the place on the mountain which he had seen in his dream. The mine is located east of Salem on the Wasatch Mountains at the base of what is now called Knob Hill. The mine was incorporated on March 4, 1909, and 114,000 shares of stock were issued. About 42,000 shares with a par value of $1 were sold to the public for $1.50 per share. Some early LDS Church leaders held stock in the Dream Mine, such as J. Golden Kimball and Matthew Cowley, as did Carter E. Grant, a nephew of Heber J. Grant. In 1910, Koyle was appointed bishop of the Leland ward. By the end of 1913, the mine descended 1,400 feet (430 m), and a pump was installed to stop it from flooding.

Koyle said that he was visited by two of the Three Nephites in a dream on January 10, 1914. These messengers told him that the Dream Mine would be a "Relief Mine" which would provide financial relief after the disasters leading up to the Second Coming. The mine would be the first "City of Refuge," providing material survival until plural marriage and the United Order were reestablished. They also warned Koyle that the Dream Mine would face "false rumors" and experience opposition from leaders of the LDS Church.

=== Opposition from the LDS Church ===
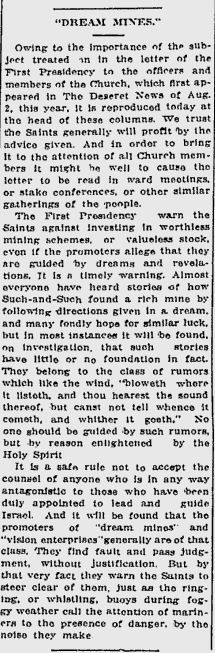
First Presidency letter published in the Deseret News on August 16, 1913

In 1913, Mormon apostle James E. Talmage, who was trained as a geologist and worked as a mining consultant, examined some ore from the Dream Mine and reported to church headquarters it was worthless. On August 16, 1913, the LDS Church issued a statement entitled "A Warning Voice" directed at Koyle's Dream Mine. The introduction to this statement reads:

The First Presidency warns the Saints against investing in worthless stock, even if promoters allege that they are guided by dreams and revelations…. Almost everyone has heard stories of how such and such has found a rich mine by following directions given in a dream, and many fondly hope for similar luck, but in most instances, it will be found on investigation, that such stories have little or no foundation in fact.

Five days after this was published, Koyle was released from his calling as bishop and succeeded by Lars Olsen, one of Koyle's followers. This 1913 statement would be recited in 1970 by LDS Church president Harold B. Lee.

The Dream Mine was closed in 1914 because of the opposition from the LDS Church, and it was reopened in September 1920 due to a $2,000 debt that the Dream Miners owed to the Spanish Fork Church Co-Operative. Work on the mine recommenced, and the main shaft soon descended 2,200 feet (670 m). The work would span about 5,000 feet (1,500 m) in drift and shaft mining. In May and July 1928, Talmage denounced the Dream Mine in articles published in the Church section of the Deseret News.

=== Later history ===
In 1929, a small deposit of platinum was reportedly discovered in the mine. Five years later, Koyle and his followers started constructing an ore mill called the "White Sentinel" just outside the Dream Mine. The mill was finished in 1936, and it processed one load of ore worth $103.03 before being shut down the next year. On January 20, 1933, the geologist Frederick J. Pack published a review of mineral samples taken from the Dream Mine in the Deseret News, declaring them practically worthless. State prosecutors from the U.S. Securities and Exchange Commission investigated the mine, and found no evidence of fraud, as improvements to the mine were more valuable than the money taken in, and its stockholders were apparently satisfied.

Koyle was brought before an LDS disciplinary council in 1947 and was told that he could either repudiate his revelations concerning the Dream Mine or be excommunicated. He signed a notarized statement repudiating his revelations, which was then published in the Deseret News on January 8, 1947. Koyle soon said that he had been forced to sign this statement, and the LDS Church excommunicated him on April 18, 1948. Koyle died on May 17, 1949, in Payson, Utah.

==== The Relief Mine Company ====
In 1962, brothers Quayle and Sheldon Dixon founded the Relief Mine Company to succeed the Koyle Mining Company. The Relief Mine Company continues to do assessment work for the mine. Work on the mine continued in the 1960s until the excavators encountered a capstone (caprock) which they could not drill through. Work on the mine became too costly to continue, and the company now earns money through a rental home, a gravel pit, and an orchard watered with the mine's water. A geological survey of the Dream Mine during this time found only limestone and quartzite, with no trace of metallic minerals.

The Internal Revenue Service audited the Relief Mine Company in 1981. In 1984, company officials said that the mine had over 6,000 stockholders. In 2010, the company had at least 706 stockholders. Each share during this time had a fair value of $10 at most, though investors would pay $30 to $35. In May 2018, the company's board reported it had more than 7,500 active stockholders.

In the 2000s, some Dream Miners formed an online community and email group to discuss the mine and Koyle's prophecies. During the 2016 United States presidential election, some Dream Miners speculated that the presidential campaign of Donald Trump would fulfill one of Koyle's prophetic dreams in which the Republican elephant would fall during an election and never rise again.

As of 2016, a small, nominal amount of mining labor was undertaken at the site each year to keep the mining claims active under Utah laws. The company makes most of its money from an orchard irrigated with water from the mine, a rental home, and a gravel pit.
