= Salem, Utah =

City in Utah, United States

- City
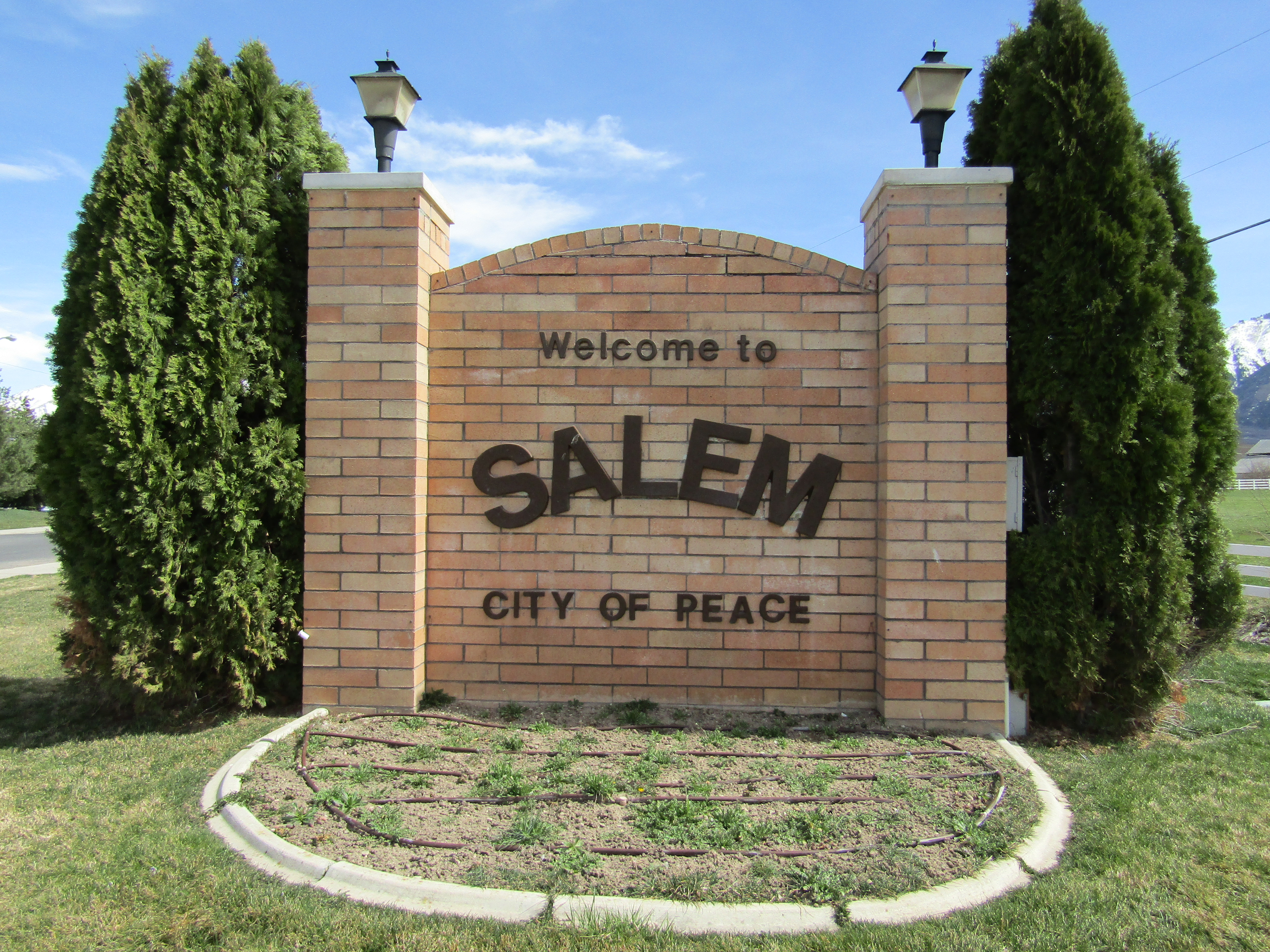
- Welcome to Salem sign, March 2017
- Nickname: City of peace
- Motto: Making Life Better
- Location in Utah County and the state of Utah
- Coordinates: 40°03′12″N 111°40′18″W
- Country: United States
- State: Utah
- County: Utah
- Settled: 1851
- Incorporated: May 10, 1920
- Named for: Salem, Massachusetts

Government
  - Type: Strong Mayor Municipal Format

Area
  - Total: 10.53 sq mi (27.26 km^{2})
  - Land: 10.51 sq mi (27.21 km^{2})
  - Water: 0.023 sq mi (0.06 km^{2})
- Elevation: 4,613 ft (1,406 m)

Population (2020)
  - Total: 9,298
  - Density: 885.0/sq mi (341.71/km^{2})
- Time zone: UTC-7 (Mountain (MST))
  - Summer (DST): UTC-6 (MDT)
- ZIP code: 84653
- Area codes: 385, 801
- FIPS code: 49-65770
- GNIS feature ID: 2411765
- Website: www.salemutah.gov

Salem is a city in Utah County, Utah. It is part of the Provo–Orem metropolitan area. The population was 9,298 at the time of the 2020 U.S. census. Landmark locations in Salem include the Dream Mine of John Hyrum Koyle and the Salem Pond.

== History ==
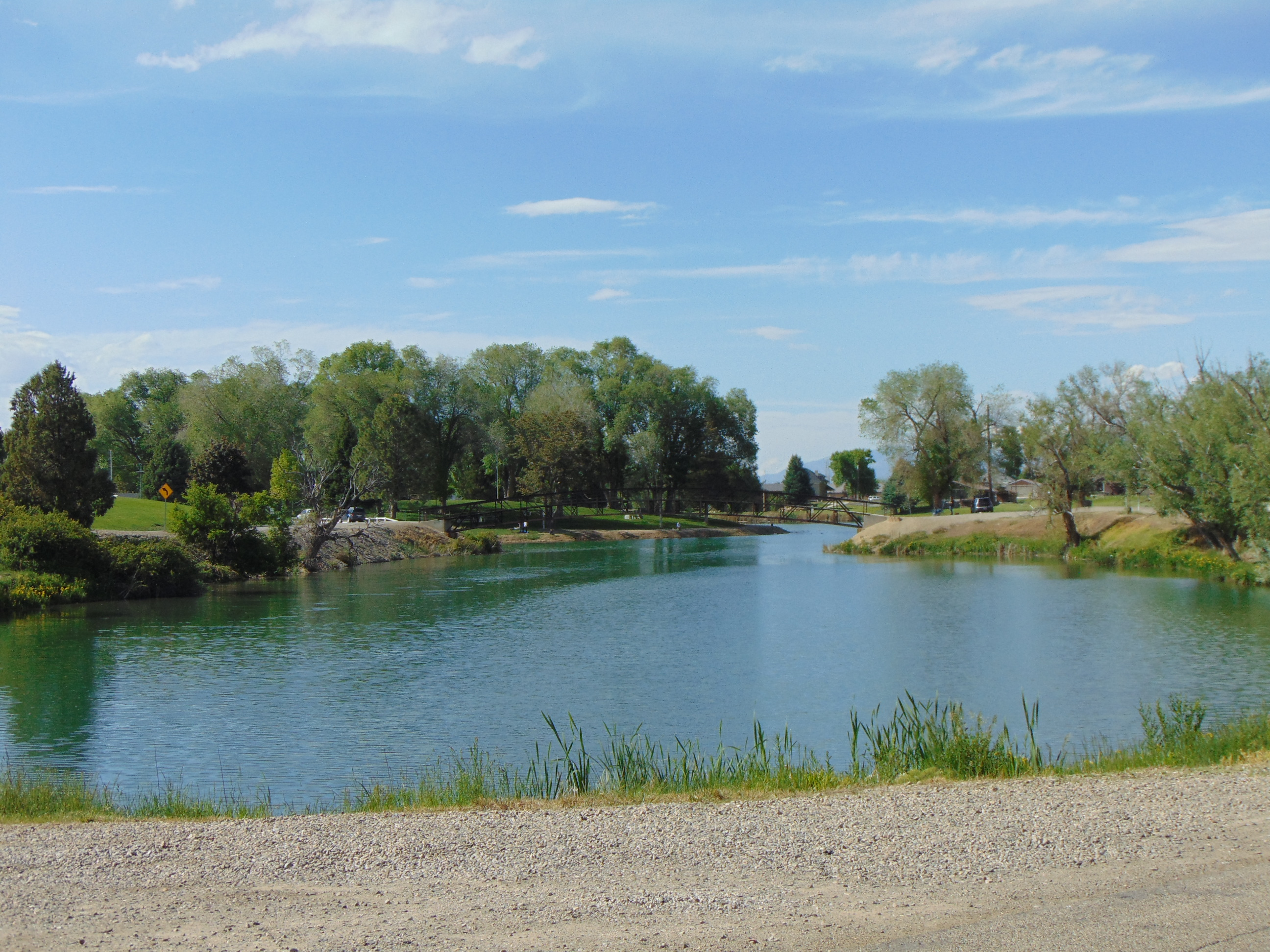
North across Salem Lake (locally known as Salem Pond), May 2016

Known as "Summer Spring" by the Indians, and "Pond Town" by early settlers. Pond Town was first settled in 1851.

Salem was later named after New Salem, Massachusetts, the birthplace of Lyman Curtis, to honor his contributions to the community. Curtis was a bodyguard for Joseph Smith. He was later among the earliest Latter-day Saint settlers in Utah. Curtis also was important in central Utah for founding a lumber mill and being involved in important irrigation efforts.

=== Salem Days ===
Salem Days is a week-long city celebration held in either the first or second week of August every year and are a collective of many activities, including a baby contest, car show, cardboard boat regatta, grand parade, firework show, pageant, children's parade, and movie in the park. It has been going on since 1949 when the Church of Jesus Christ of Latter-day Saints asked the cities of Utah to celebrate their towns yearly.

== Demographics ==
Historical population
Census	Pop.	Note	%±
1860	179		—
1870	353		97.2%
1880	510		44.5%
1890	527		3.3%
1900	894		69.6%
1910	693		−22.5%
1920	609		−12.1%
1930	610		0.2%
1940	659		8.0%
1950	781		18.5%
1960	920		17.8%
1970	1,081		17.5%
1980	2,233		106.6%
1990	2,284		2.3%
2000	4,372		91.4%
2010	6,423		46.9%
2020	9,298		44.8%
U.S. Decennial Census

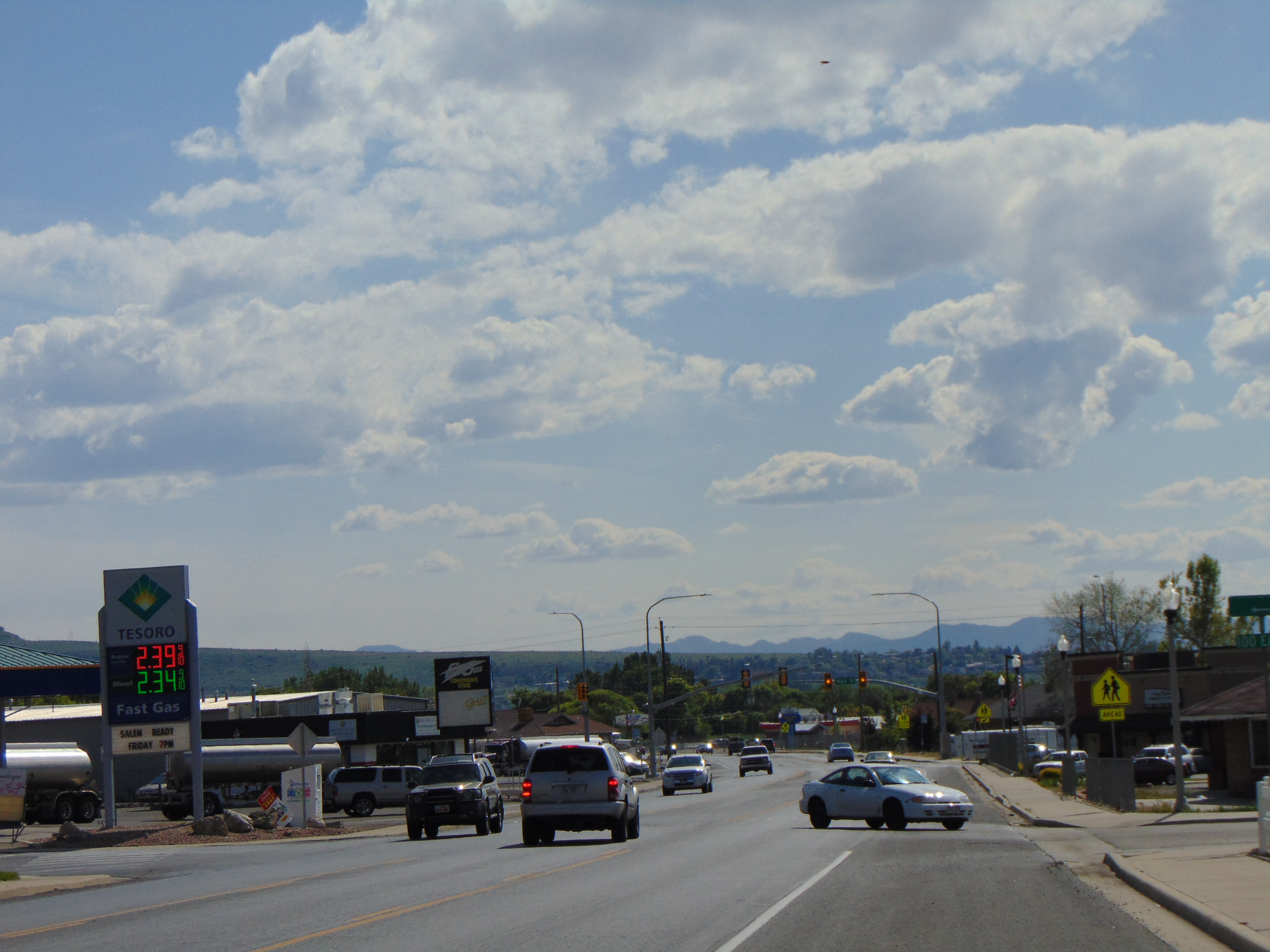
Looking southwest along Utah State Route 198 in Salem, May 2016

=== 2020 census ===
As of the 2020 census, Salem had a population of 9,298. The median age was 29.6 years; 35.5% of residents were under the age of 18 and 10.8% were 65 years of age or older. For every 100 females there were 100.6 males, and for every 100 females age 18 and over there were 98.5 males age 18 and over.

89.2% of residents lived in urban areas, while 10.8% lived in rural areas.

There were 2,497 households in Salem, of which 51.0% had children under the age of 18 living in them. Of all households, 79.1% were married-couple households, 7.2% were households with a male householder and no spouse or partner present, and 12.1% were households with a female householder and no spouse or partner present. About 10.3% of all households were made up of individuals and 5.7% had someone living alone who was 65 years of age or older.

There were 2,582 housing units, of which 3.3% were vacant. The homeowner vacancy rate was 1.0% and the rental vacancy rate was 6.0%.

Racial composition as of the 2020 census
Race	Number	Percent
White	8,572	92.2%
Black or African American	57	0.6%
American Indian and Alaska Native	32	0.3%
Asian	35	0.4%
Native Hawaiian and Other Pacific Islander	11	0.1%
Some other race	156	1.7%
Two or more races	435	4.7%
Hispanic or Latino (of any race)	478	5.1%

=== 2000 census ===
As of the census of 2000, there were 4,372 people, 1,128 households, and 1,009 families residing in the city. The population density was 825.0 people per square mile (318.5/km^{2}). There were 1,166 housing units at an average density of 220.0 per square mile (84.9/km^{2}). The racial makeup of the city was 97.07% White, 0.07% African American, 0.09% Native American, 0.14% Asian, 0.27% Pacific Islander, 1.40% from other races, and 0.96% from two or more races. Hispanic or Latino of any race were 2.79% of the population.

There were 1,128 households, out of which 56.0% had children under the age of 18 living with them, 82.3% were married couples living together, 5.1% had a female householder with no husband present, and 10.5% were non-families. 9.7% of all households were made up of individuals, and 5.1% had someone living alone who was 65 years of age or older. The average household size was 3.86 and the average family size was 4.14.

In the city, the population was spread out, with 40.6% under the age of 18, 10.2% from 18 to 24, 25.0% from 25 to 44, 16.4% from 45 to 64, and 7.8% who were 65 years of age or older. The median age was 24 years. For every 100 females, there were 102.3 males. For every 100 females age 18 and over, there were 98.2 males.

The median income for a household in the city was $54,813, and the median income for a family was $57,557. Males had a median income of $40,116 versus $22,798 for females. The per capita income for the city was $16,507. About 3.1% of families and 4.1% of the population were below the poverty line, including 5.2% of those under age 18 and 5.7% of those age 65 or over.

== Geography ==
According to the United States Census Bureau, the city has a total area of 10.2 square miles (26.4 km^{2}), of which 10.2 square miles (26.3 km^{2}) is land and 0.04 square miles (0.1 km^{2}), or 0.23%, is water. Salem is located 4.5 miles south of neighboring Spanish Fork, and 3.3 miles northeast of Payson.

=== Climate ===
This climatic region is typified by large seasonal temperature differences, with warm to hot (and often humid) summers and cold (sometimes severely cold) winters. According to the Köppen Climate Classification system, Salem has a humid continental climate, abbreviated "Dfb" on climate maps.

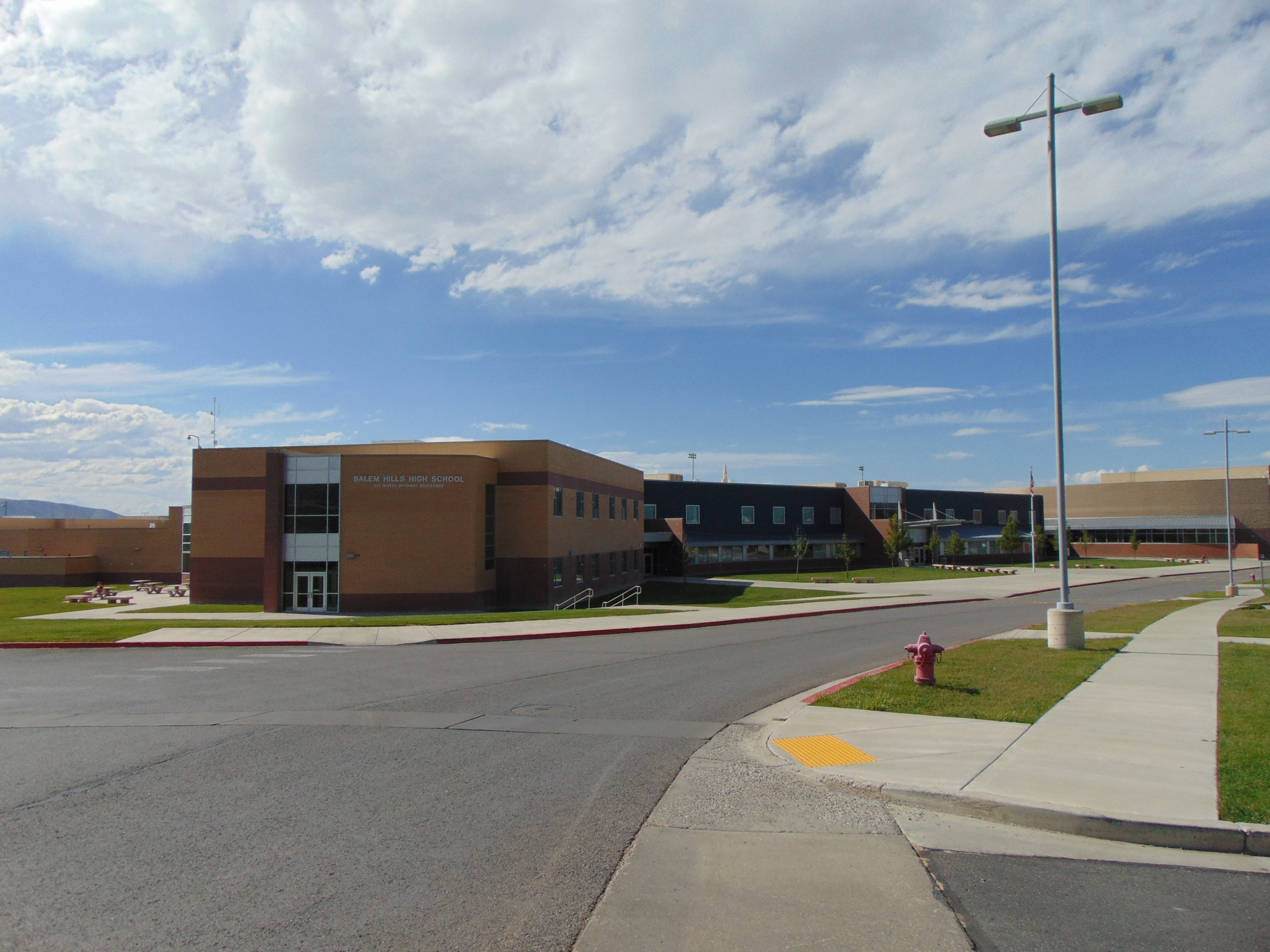
Salem Hills High School, May 2016

== Education ==
Public schools in Salem are part of the Nebo School District. Salem has three elementary schools, one junior high school, one middle school, and one high school. Rick Nielsen is the Superintendent of Schools.

== See also ==
- List of cities and towns in Utah
