= John Hyrum Koyle =

Latter-day Saint bishop and miner (1864–1949)

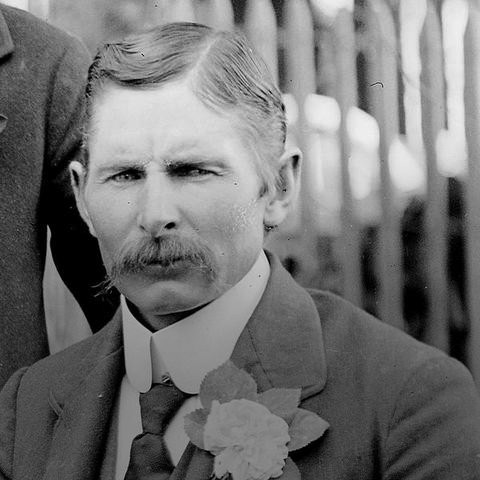
- Koyle in 1902

Bishop
- 1910 – 1913

Personal details
- Born: August 14, 1864; Spanish Fork, Utah
- Died: May 17, 1949 (aged 84); Payson, Utah
- Spouse(s): Emily Arvilla Holt

John Hyrum Koyle (August 14, 1864 – May 17, 1949) was an American religious leader who was bishop in the Church of Jesus Christ of Latter-day Saints (LDS Church) and is best known for his role in creating the Dream Mine in Salem, Utah. He claimed a series of prophetic dreams, including that the Dream Mine would produce precious metals to support the church during anticipated catastrophe before the Second Coming of Jesus, and was excommunicated from the church in 1948.

== Biography ==
Koyle was born in Spanish Fork, Utah, on August 14, 1864, to John Hyrum Koyle Sr. and Adlinda Hillman. In 1868, Brigham Young called the Koyle family to serve in the "Muddy Mission" near the Muddy River in Nevada. The family returned to Spanish Fork in 1871. Koyle and his father were quarrying stones in a canyon when the boy was 9, when a sudden rockslide occurred and he witnessed the death of his father. At the age of 14, Koyle worked as a muleskinner and teamster, selling goods to farmers in Utah County. On December 9, 1884, Koyle married Emily Arvilla Holt and bought a farm in Leland, Utah.

In 1886, Koyle heard a sermon on gaining a testimony through spiritual manifestations, so he prayed to gain a testimony. That night, he dreamed of a lost cow in a field that had an injured horn which poked its own eye. A voice asked him, "If you find your cow at this place tomorrow, will you believe that the Restored Gospel is true?" He responded yes, and that morning he reportedly saw the injured cow, just as the voice had told him. Historian Kevin Cantera compared the Dream Miners' views of this experience with traditional LDS views of Joseph Smith's First Vision.

From 1888 to 1891, Koyle served as a missionary in the Southern States Mission. During his mission, he became known for his prophetic dreams. He did not keep a diary but, according to legend, one of his dreams helped save J. Golden Kimball's life. He returned to Utah in 1894 and sold butter, cheese, and vegetables in the Mercur and Tintic mining districts. On August 27, 1894, he reportedly had a dream in which the Angel Moroni brought him to a Nephite mine on a nearby mountain, showing him nine caverns full of treasures buried by the Nephites, including the sword of Laban, the Urim and Thummim, and the golden plates. The angel instructed him to reopen this mine and dig new tunnels, and said that it would provide financial aid during an economic collapse. The angel also said that the mine's gold would help provide financial relief for the LDS Church, and fund the gathering of Israel in the last days. The mine was closed in 1914 because of the opposition from the LDS Church, and it was reopened in September 1920 due to a $2,000 debt that the Dream Miners owed to the Spanish Fork Church Co-Operative.

Koyle continued earning a reputation as a prophetic dreamer, allegedly predicting that World War I would start in 1914, and that Wall Street would crash in 1929. From 1932 to 1936, Koyle and his followers constructed an ore mill called the "White Sentinel" just outside the Dream Mine.

Koyle was brought before an hours-long disciplinary council in 1947 and was told that he could either repudiate his revelations concerning the Dream Mine or be excommunicated. He signed the notarized statement, which was then published in the Deseret News the morning of January 8, 1947, mere hours after the statement was signed. Koyle soon said that he had been forced to sign this statement, and the LDS Church excommunicated him on April 18, 1948. Koyle died on May 17, 1949, in Payson, Utah.
