= John Singer (anti-government activist) =

American homeschooler in Utah

John Singer (January 6, 1931 – January 18, 1979) was a farmer in Utah who was killed in a stand-off with state government agents while resisting arrest.

== Biography ==
Singer was born in New York City. His parents, who were German immigrants, returned to Dresden in 1932, where his father was a Nazi and joined the Schutzstaffel. Singer's mother was a member of the Church of Jesus Christ of Latter-day Saints (LDS Church) but her husband forbade her from practicing her religion. They divorced in 1945 and Singer returned to the United States with his mother. Singer married Vickie Lemon in 1965 with whom he had seven children and lived on a 2.5-acre (10,000 m^{2}) farm in Marion, Utah in Summit County, Utah.

In 1970 Singer was excommunicated from the LDS Church for not "sustaining the presidency." In 1978 he entered into a second marriage with Shirley Black, who was still married to another man with four children.

One of the main reasons Singer cited for removing his children from public school was his objection to pictures of black and white children together, and a textbook of Martin Luther King Jr., whom he said was "backed by the Communists and was a traitor to his own people." He believed that "blacks were cursed to be servants." Singer once told a reporter that, "In the eyes of God, they (blacks) are not equal."

The authorities did allow Singer to have his children home-schooled in a supervised situation. However, in 1978 his second wife's husband won custody of their children. It is unclear if him not giving up custody of the children or of his home schooling actions led to the standoff where Singer was killed. In January 1979, after Singer refused to release the children, Utah law enforcement officers returned to arrest him and surrounded his home. After refusing to surrender, he reportedly pointed his pistol at the officers who then shot him multiple times, killing him.

== See also ==
- Singer–Swapp standoff
