= Singer–Swapp standoff =

Standoff in Utah, 1988

Singer-Swapp Standoff
- The standoff tookplace in Marion, Utah.
Date	Bombing: January 16, 1988; Shootout: January 28, 1988
Location	Marion, Utah
Result	Government victory

Belligerents
United States; Federal government; DOJ; ATF; FBI; Utah; Utah Department of Corrections	Mormon fundamentalist group (surrendered)

Commanders and leaders
Fred House †	Addam Swapp (surrendered); Vickie Singer (surrendered)

Strength
150 personnel	six adults and nine children

Casualties and losses
1 killed Multiple wounded	1 wounded

The Singer-Swapp Standoff was a January 1988 incident when a Mormon fundamentalist group led by Addam Swapp and his mother-in-law, Vickie Singer, bombed a Church of Jesus Christ of Latter-day Saints chapel in Marion, Utah. The group retreated to their homestead a half mile away, holing up for 13 days as roughly 150 armed Bureau of Alcohol, Tobacco, and Firearms (ATF) and Federal Bureau of Investigation (FBI) agents surrounded their compound. According to officials, the group had instigated the attack in hope of instigating the resurrection of their previous patriarch, John Singer, who had been killed in a smaller altercation with law enforcement nine years earlier.

The standoff ended after a shootout on January 28, which left a Utah Department of Corrections Lieutenant, Fred House, dead. Several members of the Swapp group served terms in prison.

== The Singers and Addam Swapp ==
=== John Singer ===
Singer was born in 1931 in the United States to German immigrants who emigrated back to their home country soon after his birth. Singer grew up during World War II, enlisting as a member of the Hitler Youth. After the war ended, Singer traveled back to the United States to live with his aunt in New York City. His family soon followed. Once he earned enough money, Singer drove to Utah where he established a television repair business out of his home and married his first wife, Vickie Lemon Singer. It is unclear when John Singer joined the Church of Jesus Christ of Latter-day Saints (LDS Church).

In March 1973, John and Vickie Singer removed their children from the local schools, claiming that the schools had created an environment that permitted "vulgarity, sex, and drug use". The Singers also believed that textbooks should not be allowed to contain images of black and white children together. After a battle with the local school board, the Singers were allowed to homeschool their children. Singer, however, continued to fight against the state-mandated supervision forced upon them. This led to a six-year legal battle, in which the Singers fought the Utah state government for custody of their children. Eventually, John and Vickie Singer were charged with neglect and child abuse as they were found to not be adequately educating their children.

Several years earlier, the Singers had been excommunicated from the LDS Church as a result of their support of polygamy, which the church had ended in 1890 and outlawed in 1904. During their time battling the state, Singer took on a second wife, Shirley Black, and her five children.

There were two raids on their home, the first taking place on 19 October 1978. In this instance, three Utah Highway Patrol officers dressed as reporters from the LA Times tackled him, before the family came to his aid and he was able to free a hand to pull out a gun. After this incident, the Singers were under nearly constant surveillance by law enforcement. On 18 January 1979, Singer's compound was raided by a group of 10 Summit County Sheriff's officers. After pulling out his gun, Singer was shot to death.

After his death, Vickie Singer filed a lawsuit against the state for $110 million, but it was thrown out three years later. John Singer's death made him a martyr to both his family and certain libertarian and anti-federalist groups.

=== Addam Swapp ===
Addam Swapp was born on 6 April 1961 in Salt Lake City, Utah to conservative Mormon parents. Before discovering the Utah polygamist John Singer, Swapp had already been acquainted with the idea of Mormon fundamentalism as his father had introduced him to a small group in Manti, Utah. When he was 17, Swapp heard on the news about Singer's fight against the government and decided to meet him. Before he had the chance, however, Singer was killed.

In September 1980, Swapp entered the Singer family when he married John Singer's daughter Heidi. He later married another of Singer's daughters, Charlotte; between his two wives he fathered six children. In the same month that Swapp married Heidi, his cousin Roger Bates also married into the Singer-Swapp household by wedding Suzanne Singer. The family continued to live on Singer's compound for the next nine years, growing a hatred for the LDS church. In 1987, Swapp sent a letter to several community members, demanding reconciliation for Singer's death and condemning the LDS church.

== Singer-Swapp Standoff (1988) ==
=== Church Bombing ===
At 3:00 a.m. on 16 January 1988, the nine-year anniversary of John Singer's death, Addam Swapp and Vickie Singer detonated 50 pounds of nitrate-boosted dynamite inside an LDS chapel in Marion, Utah. The bomb caused damages estimated between $1 million and $1.5 million. Afterwards, the family of six adults and nine children retreated to their home compound where they prepared to defend themselves against the United States government. By that night, the compound had been surrounded by roughly 150 law enforcement personnel.

The day after the bombing, Vickie Singer's son-in-law, Roger Bates, was allowed by investigators to visit the compound, returning to explain how the family had no intention of surrendering. The group had bombed the church in hopes of resurrecting John Singer. Before the bombing, Swapp had placed a spear with nine feathers tied to it into the ground near the church, supposedly signifying the nine years since Singer's death. Footprints left in the snow led straight from the spear back to the Singer estate, confirming investigators' suspicions. Addam Swapp claimed to have received a revelation from God that he must complete these actions in order to put into motion the events which would lead to the resurrection of his father-in-law.

Similar to the standoff at Ruby Ridge, the Singers were ready to defend themselves to the death if necessary, reportedly believing the entire nation was on the verge of catastrophic collapse. By the third day, family members were observed on the property collecting wood while officials waited and tried to bring the standoff to a peaceful conclusion.

On Monday, 25 January, officials sent in Ogden Kraut, a fellow fundamentalist and friend of the Singer family, to serve as a mediator. The family again refused to cooperate, explaining only how the ordeal must escalate into a violent conflict in order for Swapp's earlier revelation to come to pass. By this time, the family had endured nine days under siege as officers had not only cut off their water and electricity, but also bombarded them with bright lights and loud noises during the night.

It was suspected the family had additional explosives.

==== Shootout ====
On Thursday, January 28, police made a final effort to take control of the compound, planning to use a flashing strobe light to incapacitate Singer before releasing police dogs on the compound. The light was meant to be triggered by a booby-trapped loud speaker positioned near the house, but was instead triggered as Swapp shot it with his rifle. The dog handler, Utah Department of Corrections Lieutenant Fred House, was confused into thinking that the plan had worked, and stepped into the open to release the dogs. John Timothy Singer (John Singer's son), who used a wheelchair at the time, opened fire on the officers, causing some superficial wounds on surrounding officers, and fatally wounding House. Despite the efforts of paramedics, House died at the scene. A firefight ensued in which Swapp was also injured.

Two armored personnel carriers then raided the compound, taking heavy fire. Swapp surrendered soon after, waving a white towel stained with blood.

== Today ==
=== Incarceration ===
Though Addam Swapp had not fired the shot which killed Fred House, he was held responsible for instigating the incident. He was sentenced to 17 years in federal prison for bombing the church, plus one to 15 years for manslaughter. He was taken to a federal prison in Arizona, as several of his relatives worked in the Utah State Prison. Swapp reportedly believed the United States government would collapse and prevent his sentencing. Upon entering prison, Swapp still appeared to be unmoved in his belief.

John Timothy Singer and Addam Swapp's brother, Jonathan Swapp, were each sentenced to 10 years. John Timothy Singer was sentenced to 1 to 15 years in prison for manslaughter. Vickie Singer was sentenced to five years in prison and five years parole for her role in the incident. In the wake of the incident, the nine Singer children were taken in to government custody.

=== Release ===
Swapp was eligible for parole in 2007, but Ann House, the widow of slain officer Fred House, objected. She believed Swapp had not shown proper remorse and personal development. Swapp was paroled six years later, on 9 July 2013, after a letter from Ann House stated her belief Swapp had shown genuine remorse and personal growth. During his final hearing, Swapp expressed his remorse and apologized profusely to the House family.

Vickie Singer was released on parole in 1994. John Timothy Singer was released on parole in early 2006.

==== Post-release ====
In 2015, both Addam Swapp and his wife, Charlotte Singer sat down for interviews with the Sacred Groves Network, a group dedicated to sharing stories of people who left Mormonism. In his interview, he tells his life story, explaining the incident through his eyes and ending with the story about how he "found Jesus" through reading the Bible. In a similar video, John Timothy Singer also testifies of his newfound faith in the Bible.

The incident has since been reflected upon in several publications such as Sunstone Magazine and Year of Polygamy.

== See also ==
- 1992 Ruby Ridge Standoff
- Warren Jeffs
