= Marion, Utah =

Marion
- CDP
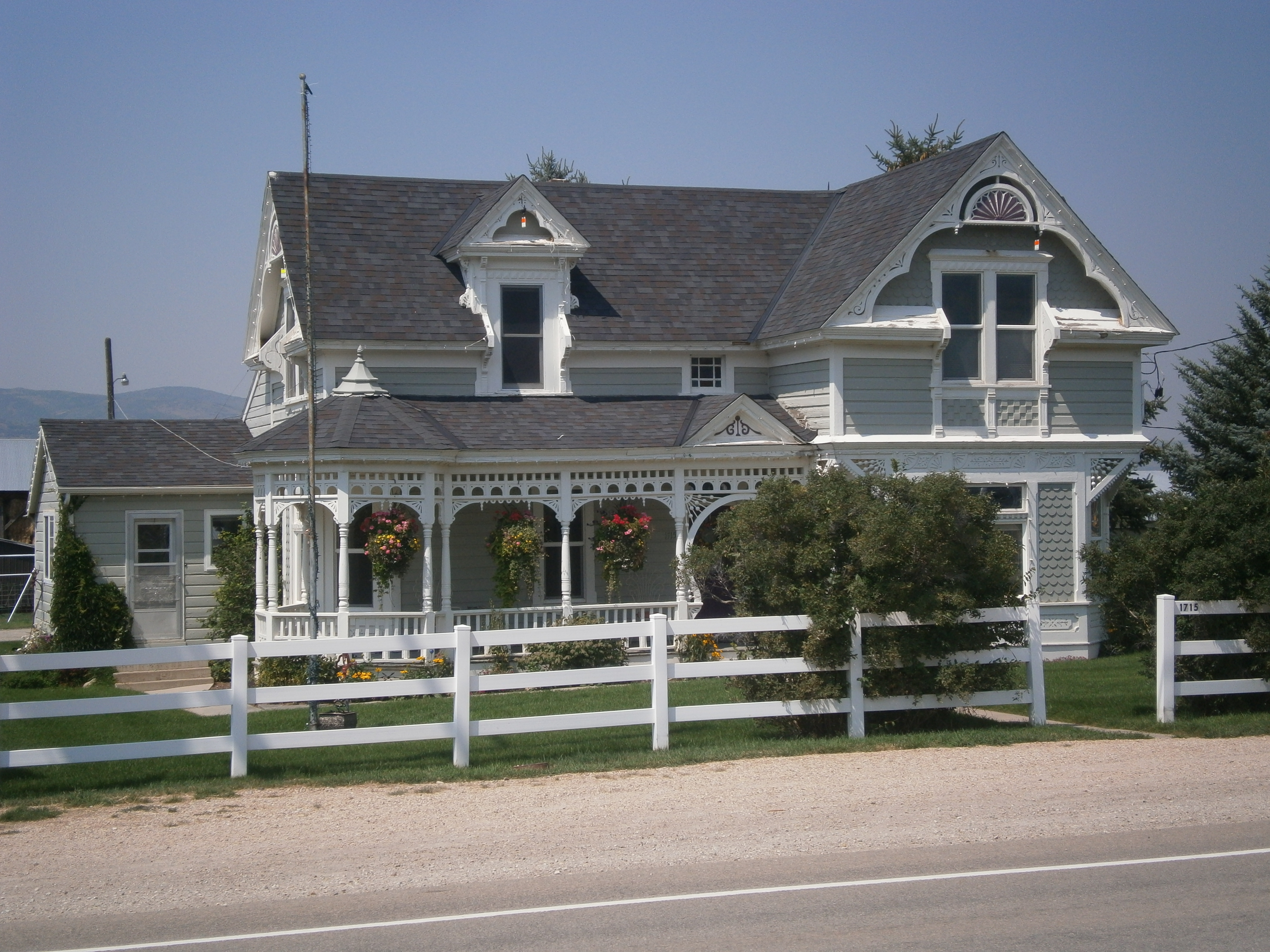
- The Myrick House is listed on the National Register of Historic Places.

- Location in Summit County and the state of Utah
- Coordinates: 40°40′53″N 111°16′58″W
- Country: United States
- State: Utah
- County: Summit
- Settled: 1870s
- Founder: William Morrell

Area
  - Total: 5.8 sq mi (15 km^{2})
  - Land: 5.8 sq mi (15 km^{2})
  - Water: 0.0 sq mi (0 km^{2})
- Elevation: 6,443 ft (1,964 m)

Population (2020)
  - Total: 676
  - Density: 120/sq mi (45/km^{2})
- Time zone: UTC-7 (Mountain (MST))
  - Summer (DST): UTC-6 (MDT)
- ZIP code: 84036
- Area code: 435
- GNIS feature ID: 2584771

Marion is a census-designated place in Summit County, Utah, United States. The population was 676, according to the 2020 census.

== Geography ==
Marion is a small farming community located about 40 miles (64 km) east of Salt Lake City and 18 miles (29 km) east of Park City in the upper Kamas Valley, part of the Wasatch Back region of Utah. Lying 2 miles (3.2 km) due north of the city of Kamas on Utah State Route 32, Marion has always been closely associated with Kamas. Approximately 3 miles (4.8 km) to the north, across the Weber River, is the city of Oakley.

== History ==
The area that is now Marion was used in the 1860s by rancher Samuel P. Hoyt, whose 600–700 head of cattle grazed over most of Marion's land. The settlement itself was founded in the mid-1870s and was originally named "Morrell" after William Morrell, who built the first house. A large portion of the early settlers were Danish American immigrants, and the community was also often called "Denmark".

The name Marion has been credited to two different sources: Francis Marion Lyman, who, as President of the Quorum of the Twelve Apostles of the Church of Jesus Christ of Latter-day Saints, organized the first ward in the area in 1909, and Marion Myrick Sorensen, who settled here with her first husband in 1882. The Marion precinct first appeared under that name in the 1900 census.

Marion made news in 1979 when resident and polygamist homeschooler John Singer was killed while resisting arrest. The community garnered further publicity in 1988 when Addam Swapp, Singer's son-in-law, bombed the LDS stake center in Marion as part of an attempt to trigger Swapp's resurrection, which resulted in a 13-day standoff with state and federal law enforcement.

== Demographics ==
Historical population
Census	Pop.	Note	%±
1900	187		—
1910	128		−31.6%
1920	170		32.8%
1930	172		1.2%
1940	195		13.4%
1950	197		1.0%
2010	685		—
2020	676		−1.3%
Source: U.S. Census Bureau

As of the census of 2010, there were 685 people living in the CDP. There were 226 housing units. The racial makeup of the CDP was 96.4% White, 1.0% American Indian and Alaska Native, 1.8% from some other race, and 0.9% from two or more races. Hispanic or Latino of any race were 3.6% of the population.

== Economy ==
The main economic activity in Marion has traditionally been farming. There are a few other businesses, including a small co-op store and a snowmobile dealership.

== Education ==
Marion has no schools of its own.

Marion is in the South Summit School District. Schools in Kamas, belonging to the South Summit district, serve school-age children.

== See also ==
- List of census-designated places in Utah
