= List of denominations in the Latter Day Saint movement =

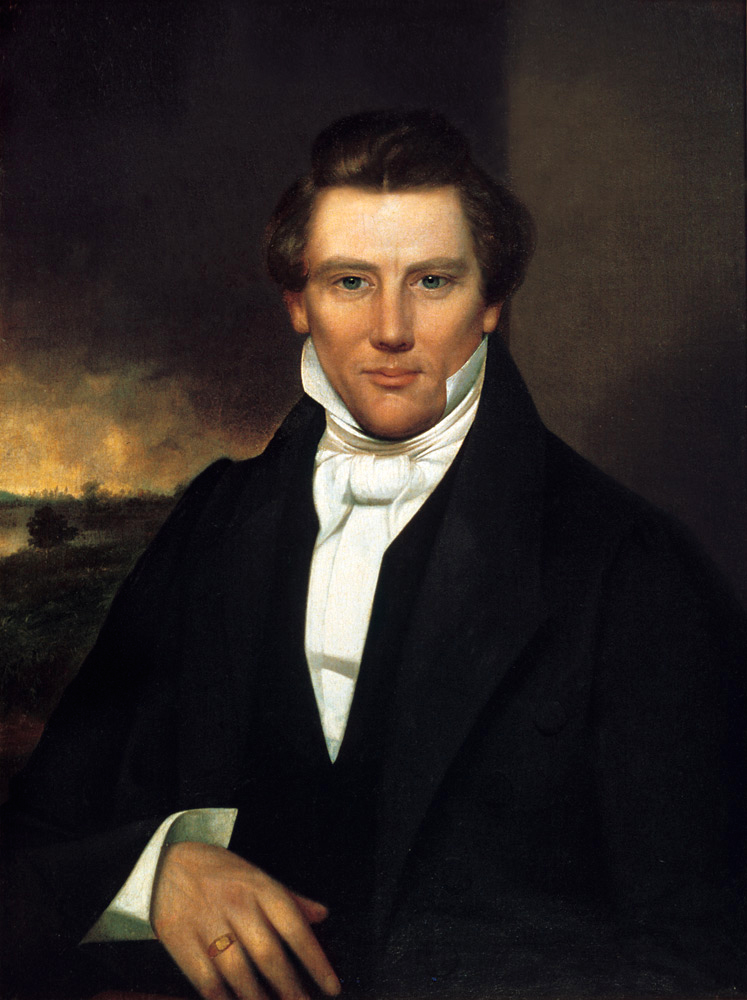
c. 1842 portrait of Joseph Smith, the Latter Day Saint movement's founder

An estimated over 400 denominations in the Latter Day Saint movement (sometimes collectively referred to as Mormonism) have sprung from founder Joseph Smith's original movement, according to Benjamin Park. Mormon is an informal term used especially when referring to the largest Latter Day Saint denomination, the Church of Jesus Christ of Latter-day Saints (LDS Church), and other offshoots in the movement. Some groups opposed to the use of the term Mormon consider it to be connected to the polygamy once practiced by the Utah church, or to pejoratives used against early adherents of the movement.

The Latter Day Saint movement includes:

- The original church within this movement, founded in April 1830 in New York by Joseph Smith, was the Church of Christ. It was later named the "Church of the Latter Day Saints". It was renamed the "Church of Jesus Christ of Latter Day Saints" in 1838 (stylized as the "Church of Jesus Christ of Latter-day Saints" in the United Kingdom), which remained its official name until Smith's death in 1844. This organization subsequently splintered into several different denominations, each of which claims to be the legitimate continuation of this original church. Most of these dispute the right of other denominations within the movement to claim this distinction.
- The largest denomination within the contemporary movement is the LDS Church, with over 17 million members. It is headquartered in Salt Lake City, Utah.
- The second-largest denomination is the Community of Christ, based in Missouri. This denomination has some 250,000 members and was formally organized in 1860. They were called the "Reorganized Church of Jesus Christ of Latter Day Saints" until 2001. Although members of this church have traditionally been called Latter Day Saints (without the hyphen), the Community of Christ has stated since at least 2013 it disapproves of the term Saints as a designation for its members in any official reference or publication.
- The largest groups of Mormon fundamentalism include the Fundamentalist Church of Jesus Christ of Latter Day Saints (FLDS), Centennial Park Group (The Work), Apostolic United Brethren (AUB or Allred Group), and Latter Day Church of Christ (DCCS or Kingston Group).
- Other denominations within the movement either formed around various would-be successors to Smith, or else broke from denominations that did. These, together with the denominations listed above, are detailed in the table of denominations within the Latter Day Saint movement below.

Although a few small factions broke with Smith's organization during his lifetime, he retained the allegiance of the majority of Latter Day Saints until his death in June 1844. Following Smith's death, the movement underwent a leadership crisis which led to a schism within the church. The largest group followed Brigham Young and settled in what became the Utah Territory and is now the Utah-based LDS Church. The second-largest faction, Community of Christ, coalesced around Joseph Smith III, eldest son of Joseph Smith. Other would-be leaders included the senior surviving member of the First Presidency, Sidney Rigdon; the newly baptized James Strang from Wisconsin; and Alpheus Cutler, one of the Council of Fifty. Each of these men still retains a following as of 2014—however tiny it may be in some cases—and all of their organizations have undergone further schisms. Other claimants, such as Granville Hedrick, William Bickerton, and Charles B. Thompson, later emerged to start still other factions, some of which have further subdivided.

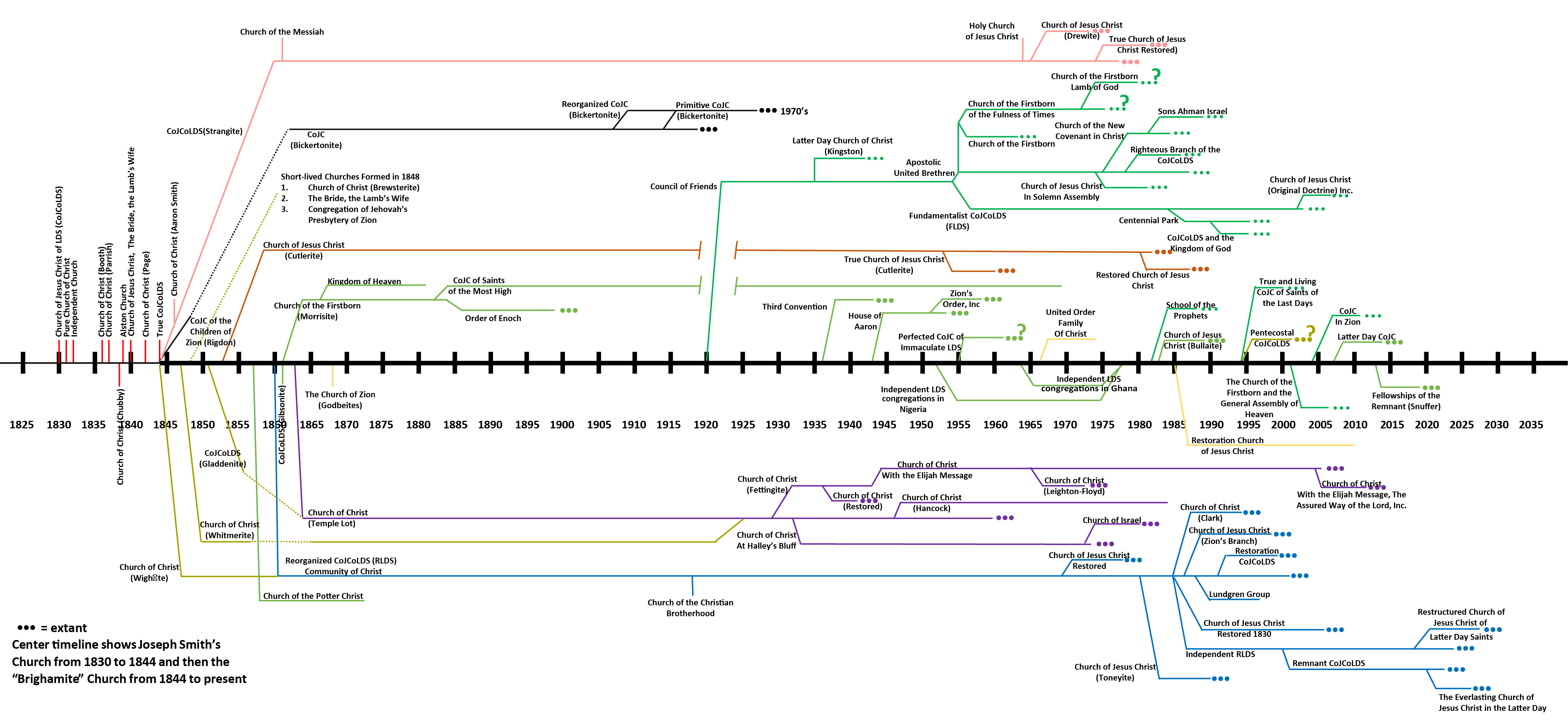
Diagram showing over 70 branches of Mormonism with their relative origins and approximate years of division. The thicker central line after 1844 is the largest by numbers Brighamite branch.

== Categorizing the churches ==
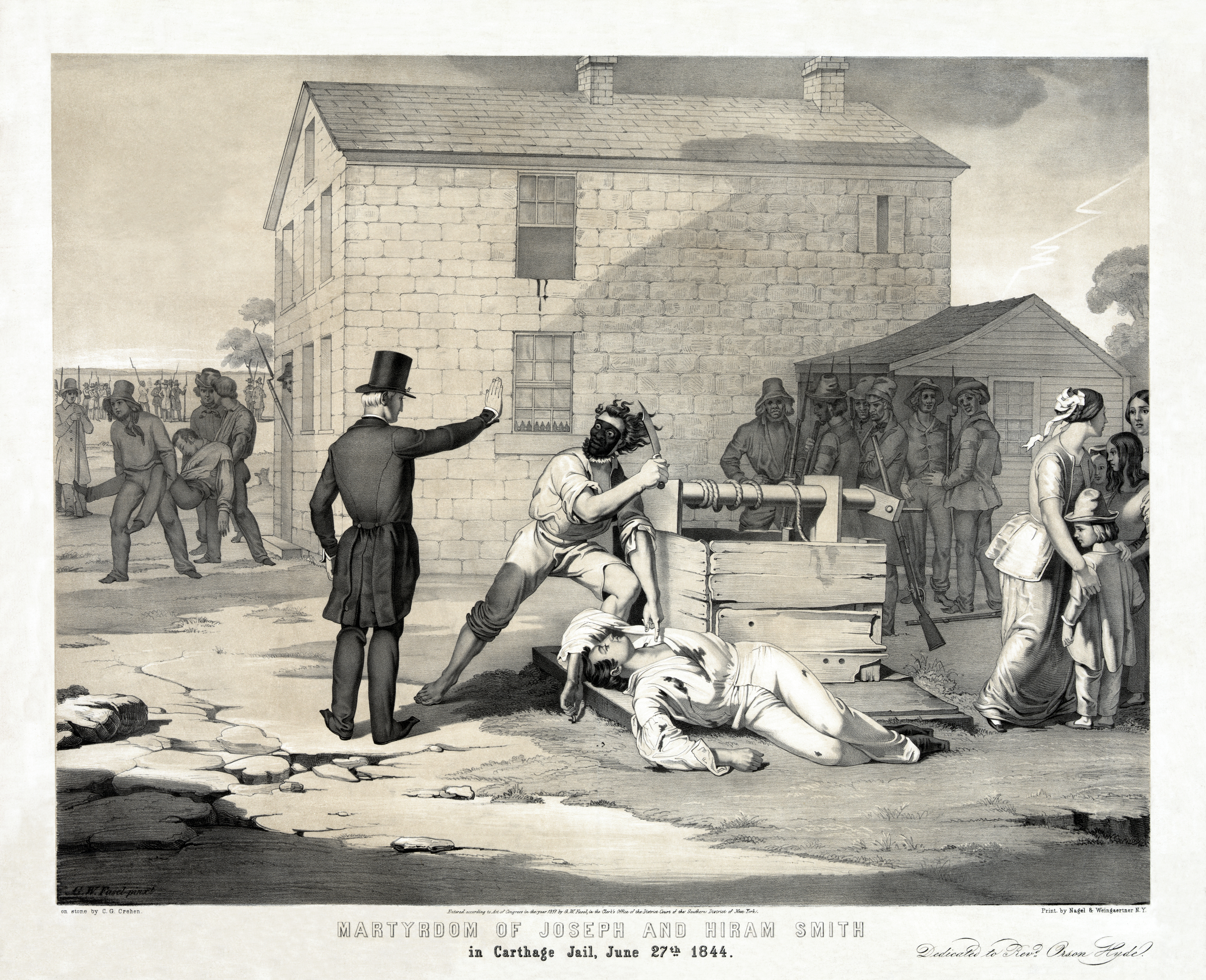
An 1851 tinted lithograph depicting the death of Joseph Smith in 1844

Given the large number of Latter Day Saint churches and their differing backgrounds, categorizing them can be difficult. In the field of Mormon studies, terms such as Rocky Mountain Saints are sometimes used for those denominations headquartered in the American West and Prairie Saints for those denominations that formed in and around Nauvoo, Illinois; Voree, Wisconsin; Independence, Missouri; and other locations in the Midwest and East. These terms do not necessarily relate the current geographical locations of all denominations within those two groupings, but rather the original location of their respective parent organizations, which may be seen in the table below.

Another method uses provenance: for instance, all denominations that ultimately trace their history back to the LDS Church based in Utah, are organized as one factional group. Divergent Paths of the Restoration—a reference work on this subject—follows this approach.

In such studies, and in general Latter Day Saint parlance, the -ite-suffixed terms Josephite and Brighamite have been used for the Missouri-based Community of Christ and the Utah-based LDS Church, respectively; these terms have sometimes been used to distinguish groups of denominations as well. Those denominations within each group share a common ancestry and basic beliefs that are different from groups sharing other provenances. The present article, in a similar fashion, distinguishes among groups of denominations by use of commonly understood names such as Mormon fundamentalist or else by short descriptions that often reference a founder of the first church within a factional group—for example, Joseph Smith III in reference to Community of Christ as well as various churches and factions that trace their origin to it.

== List of Latter Day Saint movement churches ==
=== Era of Joseph Smith ===
Joseph Smith's original church, and those bodies which broke with him during his lifetime.

==== Original church within movement ====
The original organization, founded by Joseph Smith in 1830, later called the Church of the Latter-Day Saints and then The Church of Jesus Christ of Latter-Day Saints.

Name	Organized by	Date	Current status	Notes
Church of Christ	Joseph Smith	April 6, 1830	Smith's original organization; multiple denominations currently claim to be its true successor	In 1834, official name changed to "Church of the Latter Day Saints". In 1838, official name changed again to "Church of Jesus Christ of Latter Day Saints". Unofficial names included Church of God and Church of Jesus Christ.

==== Churches that separated from Smith's organization prior to 1844 ====
Other small churches formed on the basis of disagreements with Smith prior to his murder in 1844 (including church established by William Law within 1844), all of which are now defunct.

Church name	Organized by	Date	Split from	Current status	Notes
Pure Church of Christ	Wycam Clark	1831	Church of Christ	Defunct	First schismatic denomination in the Latter Day Saint movement.
Independent Church	– Hoton	1832	Church of Christ	Defunct	Little is known about this second schismatic denomination apart from the date of establishment, the surname of its founder, and that Hoton denounced Joseph Smith and the Book of Mormon.
Church of Christ	Ezra Booth	1836	Church of the Latter Day Saints	Defunct	Taught that Joseph Smith was not a prophet, and the Book of Mormon was not scripture.
Church of Christ	Warren Parrish	1837	Church of the Latter Day Saints	Defunct	Also referred to as the Church of Christ (Parrishite). Believed that Smith was a "fallen prophet". Rejected the Book of Mormon and parts of the Bible.
Alston Church	Isaac Russell	1839	Church of Jesus Christ of Latter Day Saints	Defunct	Taught that the Latter Day Saints should remain in Missouri, and not emigrate to Illinois.
Church of Christ	William Chubby	Late 1830s	Church of Jesus Christ of Latter Day Saints	Defunct	Established with the special mission of ministering to African Americans.
Church of Jesus Christ, the Bride, the Lamb's Wife	George M. Hinkle	1840	Church of Jesus Christ of Latter Day Saints	Defunct	Taught that Smith was not a prophet, and the Book of Mormon was not scripture.
Church of Christ	Hiram Page	1842	Church of Jesus Christ of Latter Day Saints	Defunct	Little is known concerning this denomination, except that its founder was one of the Eight Witnesses to the Book of Mormon's golden plates
True Church of Jesus Christ of Latter Day Saints	William Law	1844	Church of Jesus Christ of Latter Day Saints	Defunct	Opposed plural marriage; published the Nauvoo Expositor. Charges levied against Smith over the destruction of this periodical led to his assassination.

=== Lineage of Brigham Young ===
Sometimes called "Rocky Mountain Saints", "Brighamites", or "Mormons", tracing their leadership or influence through Brigham Young.

==== The Church of Jesus Christ of Latter-day Saints ====
The LDS Church is by far the largest and most well-known Latter Day Saint church. It is colloquially referred to as the "Mormon Church". The church prefers to be called by its full title or by the shorthand "Church of Jesus Christ" to emphasize its worship of Jesus Christ and to distance itself from the phrase "Mormon", which has derogatory origins.

Name	Organized by	Date	Continuation of\split from	Current status	Notes
The Church of Jesus Christ of Latter-day Saints	Brigham Young and Quorum of the Twelve	1844 (trust reorganized); 1851 (incorporated)	Church of Jesus Christ of Latter Day Saints	16.8 million members as of 2021	The largest Latter Day Saint denomination. Headquartered in Salt Lake City, Utah. Often colloquially referred to as the Mormon Church. Adherents are popularly called Mormons or Latter-day Saints. Resulted from Latter Day Saints that followed Joseph Smith. Practiced plural marriage until it was discontinued in 1890. Disincorporated in 1877 by the Edmunds–Tucker Act, reorganized in 1923 as the Corporation of the President of The Church of Jesus Christ of Latter-day Saints

==== Churches upholding polygamy after the Manifesto of 1890 ====
Churches that believe they are strictly following the revelations and teachings of Joseph Smith and Brigham Young, including the practice of plural marriage, which was discontinued by the LDS Church in the late-19th century after the Manifesto.

Name	Organized by	Date	Split from	Current status	Notes
Council of Friends	Lorin C. Woolley	1920s	LDS Church	Multiple denominations claim to be true successor	Also known as the Priesthood Council, this group was originally headquartered in Salt Lake City, Utah, and the Short Creek Community. One of the earliest Mormon fundamentalist groups, originating at end of plural marriage in LDS Church. Later splintered into several groups, particularly upon death of Joseph W. Musser in 1954. Most modern Mormon fundamentalist groups may be traced back to this organization.
Latter Day Church of Christ	Elden Kingston	1935	Council of Friends	About 7,500 members (2019)	Headquartered in Davis County, Utah. Commonly known as the "Davis County Cooperative Society".
El Reino de Dios en su Plenitud (The Kingdom of God in its Fulness)	Margarito Bautista	1947	Remnants of the Third Convention that did not rejoin the Church in 1946	About 800 members (2011)	After being expelled from the Third Convention movement in 1937, Margarito Bautista made preparations to found a colonia as a religious utopian project. Bautista and other former members of the Third Convention that did not join the mass reconciliation in 1946 founded Colonia Industrial in Ozumba, Mexico and established their own Mormon sect. The sect, now known as El Reino de Dios en su Plenitud, remains extant, and it continues practicing economic communitarianism and plural marriage.
Apostolic United Brethren	Rulon C. Allred	1954	Council of Friends	Approximately 10,000 members (1998)	Headquarters in Bluffdale, Utah. Organized during schism between two groups over issue of presiding authority between Rulon C. Allred and Leroy S. Johnson, upon death of Joseph W. Musser.
Fundamentalist Church of Jesus Christ of Latter-Day Saints	Leroy S. Johnson	1954	Council of Friends	8,000–10,000 members	Traditionally headquartered in Colorado City, Arizona, with a community of roughly 700 members near Eldorado, Texas. Also called "FLDS Church" and is the largest group of Latter Day Saints who practice plural marriage and Mormon fundamentalism.
Church of the Firstborn of the Fulness of Times	Joel F. LeBaron	1955	Apostolic United Brethren	Precise continuity unknown, several hundred or a thousand believers' following one or another putative successors to denomination leadership	Headquartered in Colonia Lebaron, Mexico Established in northern Mexico and elsewhere, this group claims an especial priesthood keys owing to a line of authority through Benjamin F. Johnson, a member of the Council of Fifty.
Church of the Firstborn	Ross Wesley LeBaron	1955	Church of the Firstborn of the Fulness of Times	A hundred or more	Originally headquartered in Salt Lake City, Utah. (Within months of the organization of the Church of the Firstborn of the Fulness of Times, Ross Wesley LeBaron broke with his brothers and formed his own denomination, calling it simply "The Church of the Firstborn". Wesley believed he was sent to prepare the way for the One Mighty and Strong, who would be "an Indian prophet". Three notable early followers were Fred Collier (whose 100-plus membership clan live in Hanna, Utah and elsewhere), Tom Green, and Robert Black.
Church of Jesus Christ in Solemn Assembly	Alex Joseph	1974	Apostolic United Brethren	Approximately 400 headquartered in Big Water, Utah	In conjunction with the Church of Jesus Christ in Solemn Assembly, Alex Joseph group created the Confederate Nations of Israel in 1977, a Hybrid church–political organization patterned after the Council of Fifty. Members can be from any religious denomination or atheist. Around one-quarter of members practice plural marriage.
Church of the First Born Lamb of God	Ervil LeBaron	1972	Church of the Firstborn of the Fulness of Times	Current status unknown, may continue in LeBaron family in Los Molinos, Baja California	Ervil LeBaron split with his brother, Joel F. LeBaron in 1972. Ervil then ordered his brother Joel killed in 1972, and Apostolic United Brethren leader Rulon C. Allred killed in 1977. LeBaron was extradited to the United States and sentenced to life in prison where he died in 1981.
Church of the New Covenant in Christ	John W. Bryant	1975	Apostolic United Brethren	Headquartered in Salem, Oregon	Previously called the "Church of Christ Patriarchal" and the "Evangelical Church of Christ". One of Bryant's estranged wives says Bryant converted temple ordinances into sexual rites and that he authorized a type of "free love" among the members.
Righteous Branch of the Church of Jesus Christ of Latter-day Saints	Gerald Peterson, Sr.	1978	Apostolic United Brethren	Approximately 100–200 members. Headquartered in St. George, Utah.	This small group of about 100–200 people was founded by Gerald Peterson Sr. They claim Gerald Peterson Sr. was the rightful successor to Rulon C. Allred and Spencer W. Kimball. They claim Allred and others, including God and Jesus, visited Peterson, who held and exercised all priesthood responsibilities and keys.
Sons Ahman Israel	David Israel	1981	Church of the New Covenant in Christ	Based in Cane Beds, Arizona. The number of members is unknown.	One of the lesser known Fundamentalist Groups, organized by David Israel (real name, Gilbert Clark) with members of the Apostolic United Brethren and members of John W. Bryant's Group. One of David Israel's revelation repudiates the succession of Brigham Young and affirms the appointment of James J. Strang. Another states that John Bryant was by then fallen.
School of the Prophets	Robert C. Crossfield	1982	The Church of Jesus Christ of Latter-day Saints	Headquartered in Salem, Utah	In 1968 Crossfield published the Book of Onias which, among other things, condemned many LDS Church leaders; he was excommunicated in 1972. Through associations, and initially well received, with Mormon fundamentalists in Creston, British Columbia, Canada, in 1982 Crossfield established his own "School of the Prophets", presided over by a President and six counselors. Ron and Dan Lafferty, convicted of the 1984 murder of their brother's wife and infant daughter, served as counselors in the Provo, Utah, School of the Prophets in 1984.
Centennial Park	Marion Hammon and Alma Timpson	1984	Fundamentalist Church of Jesus Christ of Latter-Day Saints	Roughly 1,500 members	Also known as the "Second Ward". Organized by group who broke from Leroy S. Johnson over questions regarding presiding authority.
The Church of Jesus Christ of Latter-day Saints and the Kingdom of God	Frank Naylor and Ivan Neilsen	1990	Centennial Park	200–300 members. Headquartered in Bluffdale, Utah	Also known as the "Naylor group" and the "Third Ward". Organized by group who broke from Centennial Park over conflicts in the leadership of Alma Timpson.
True and Living Church of Jesus Christ of Saints of the Last Days	James D. Harmston	1994	LDS Church	300–500 members (2004) Headquartered in Manti, Utah.	Also called "TLC Church" and formed independent of the Woolley or the LeBaron priesthood lineages.
The Church of the Firstborn and the General Assembly of Heaven	Terrill R. Dalton	2001	LDS Church	Currently headquartered in Fromberg, Montana	Originally organized in Magna, Utah, by former members of the LDS Church. Practice polygamy and the law of consecration. Dalton purports to be the Holy Ghost and the Father of Jesus.
Church of Jesus Christ (Original Doctrine) Inc.	Winston Blackmore	2002	Fundamentalist Church of Jesus Christ of Latter Day Saints	Headquartered in Bountiful, British Columbia with approximately 700 members	Also known as the Blackmore/Bountiful Community, this schism from the FLDS Church occurred when church president Warren Jeffs excommunicated Blackmore, causing the community of Bountiful to split nearly in half.
Church of Jesus Christ in Zion	John Eyre	2004	LDS Church	Approximately 1,000 members Originating in Independence, Missouri	This little known Group is headed by John Eyre, who like so many is a former member of the mainstream LDS church.

==== Left-of-center LDS-derived churches ====
The defunct Godbeites and a few other small churches that broke with the LDS Church to pursue a more liberal, inclusive, or rationalist theology.

Name	Organized by	Date	Split off / Continuation of	Current status	Notes
The Church of Zion	William S. Godbe	1868	LDS Church	Defunct	Also known as "Godbeites".
United Order Family of Christ	David-Edward Desmond	1966	LDS Church	Lasted until at least 1973, probably until 1974.	Founded in Denver, Colorado; the church was founded specifically for young gay men only, ages 18 to 30; members practiced the United Order.
Restoration Church of Jesus Christ	Antonio A. Feliz	1985	LDS Church	Dissolved in 2010.	Majority of members were LGBT. Commonly called the "Gay Mormon Church" or the "Liberal Mormon Church". Originally called the "Church of Jesus Christ of All Latter-day Saints".

==== Additional churches claiming lineage through Brigham Young or founded in the U.S. Intermountain West ====
Several small churches rooted in Mormonism; formed under the belief that their leader was inspired to restore a new religious tradition in the mold of Joseph Smith

Name	Organized by	Date	Split off / Continuation of	Current status	Notes
Church of the Potter Christ	Arnold Potter	1857	LDS Church	Defunct	Potter wore a long beard and white robes; his followers wore black robes; followers emigrated from California to Council Bluffs, Iowa, in 1861.
Church of the Firstborn (Morrisite)	Joseph Morris	1861	LDS Church	Assumed defunct	Remnants of this organization survived into the mid-20th century. Involved in the Morrisite War; believe in reincarnation. Morris claimed to be the successor of James Strang, though his organization broke from the LDS, not the Strangite, church.
Church of Jesus Christ of Latter Day Saints (Gibsonite)	Walter M. Gibson	1861	LDS Church	Defunct	Organized in Pacific Islands; sold leadership offices to native peoples; gathering place established on Lanai, Hawaii.
Kingdom of Heaven	William W. Davies	1866	Church of the Firstborn (Morrisite)	Defunct	Lived a communal life near Walla Walla, Washington, from 1867 to 1881.
Church of Jesus Christ of Saints of the Most High	John R. Eardley	1882	Church of the Firstborn (Morrisite)	Disbanded in 1969	The last known surviving remnant of the "Morrisites".
Order of Enoch	James Brighouse	1884	Reorganized Church of Jesus Christ of Latter Day Saints and Church of the Firstborn (Morrisite)	Continues into the 21st century	Believe in reincarnation; rejected plural marriage; believe that Jesus reincarnated as Brighouse and again in 1909 as Dr. Dahesh and that the millennium will commence in the 24th century.
Third Convention	Abel Páez	1936	LDS Church	Reunified with the mainline church in 1946	Formed by Abel Páez and a dissident group of Mexican Latter-day Saints who broke away from the main body of church authority in 1936 over a dispute about local governance and autonomy of the church in Mexico. The overwhelming majority of Third Convention members reunified with the mainline church in 1946, though some break-offs from the Third Convention established their own denominations (for example, Margarito Bautista's still extant El Reino de Dios).
House of Aaron	Maurice L. Glendenning	1943	LDS Church	Fewer than 1,000 members	Also called "Aaronic Order" and the "Order of Aaron". Religious researchers have categorized The House of Aaron as part of the Latter Day Saint movement, which this denomination disputes.
Zion's Order, Inc.	Merl Kilgore	1951	Aaronic Order and the LDS Church	Headquartered in Mansfield, Missouri; approximately 30 members	Formerly known as Zion's Order of the Sons of Levi; use all of the scriptures of the LDS Church except section 132 of the Doctrine and Covenants, plus 650 revelations to Kilgore.
Perfected Church of Jesus Christ of Immaculate Latter-day Saints	William C. Conway	1955	LDS Church	Unknown	Also called "Restored Apostolic Church of Jesus Christ of Immaculate Latter-day Saints"; Conway claimed to be the reincarnation of Moroni and to have been visited by a reincarnation of Joseph Smith.
Church of Jesus Christ (Bullaite)	Art Bulla	1983	LDS Church	Headquartered in Salt Lake City, Utah	Bulla taught other Latter-day Saints that he was the "One Mighty and Strong" that Joseph Smith prophesied would come to set the church in order. Bulla was interviewed in the anti-Mormon movie The God Makers II with the title "Mormon Prophet" under his name.
The Restored Branch of Jesus Christ	Matthew P. Gill	2007	LDS Church	Headquartered in Derbyshire, England	Met informally as "The Latter Day Church of Christ" until formal organization, now known as "The Restored Branch of Jesus Christ". Added The Chronicles of The Children of Araneck to scriptural canon.

=== Other lineages ===
Those churches rejecting Brigham Young's leadership, in favor of some other claimant. These adherents are occasionally referred to, collectively, as "Prairie Saints".

==== Reorganized Church and other followers of Joseph Smith III ("Josephites") ====
The Reorganized Church of Jesus Christ of Latter Day Saints and related churches tracing their leadership through Joseph Smith III.

Name	Organized by	Date	Split off / Continuation of	Current status	Notes
Community of Christ	Joseph Smith III	1860	Church of Jesus Christ of Latter Day Saints; some early members came from Strangite church	More than 250,000 members as of 2020	Second-largest Latter Day Saint denomination. Headquartered in Independence, Missouri. Previously known as the "Reorganized Church of Jesus Christ of Latter Day Saints" (RLDS Church); organized by Joseph Smith III in 1860.
Church of the Christian Brotherhood	R. C. Evans	1918	Reorganized Church of Jesus Christ of Latter Day Saints	Defunct	Split with RLDS Church due to their denial that Joseph Smith practiced plural marriage; Evans published a book documenting evidence that Smith was a polygamist, then went on to reject most of the tenets of Mormonism.
Church of Jesus Christ Restored	Stanley King	1960s	Reorganized Church of Jesus Christ of Latter Day Saints	Headquartered in Ontario, Canada	Fundamentalist church that split from the RLDS Church and instituted polygamy and the United Order; has about 40 members
Church of Jesus Christ (Toneyite)	Forrest Toney	1980	Reorganized Church of Jesus Christ of Latter Day Saints	Headquartered in Independence, Missouri	Left RLDS Church in 1980; claimed to be "Elijah and only prophet" of his organization.
Independent RLDS / Restoration Branches	Various local leaders of the RLDS church	1980s	Reorganized Church of Jesus Christ of Latter Day Saints	As of 1993, 15,000–30,000 sympathizers who yet retained membership in the RLDS Church (Community of Christ); as of 2011, c. 10,000 members attending several hundred distinct congregations.	Affiliated branches and study groups, with each branch relatively autonomous and the movement as a whole centered in Independence, Missouri. RLDS Church branches that became independent of the RLDS Church individually throughout the 1980s, due to opposition to changes in church doctrines and practices. Most priesthood holders of these branches soon became affiliated with the "Conference of Restoration Elders". At a three-day conference in November 2005, the "Joint Conference of Restoration Branches" was formed, which had 6,000 to 7,000 members as of 2010. Members consider themselves members of the [historical] RLDS Church, in a direct line of succession from those who dissented following doctrinal changes roughly coinciding with the church's name change to Community of Christ.
Church of Jesus Christ Restored 1830	Nolan W. Glauner	Mid-1980s	Reorganized Church of Jesus Christ of Latter Day Saints	Members in Missouri and Africa; headquartered in Tarkio, Missouri	Regards Wallace B. Smith as a "fallen prophet" of the RLDS Church for his opening the priesthood to women and for choosing to build the Independence Temple as opposed to the city of Zion.
Church of Christ	David B. Clark	1985	Reorganized Church of Jesus Christ of Latter Day Saints	Headquartered in Oak Grove, Missouri	Also known as "Lion of God Ministry". Clark broke from the RLDS Church in November 1985. In May 1987, Clark began to issue a newsletter, "The Return". Group adheres closely to the King James Version of the Bible and "The Record of the Nephites" [Book of Mormon], but does not consider other Mormon scripture to be authoritative. They keep annual feasts, including Passover, Pentecost, Tabernacles, etc.
Church of Jesus Christ (Zion's Branch)	John and Robert Cato, among others	1986	Reorganized Church of Jesus Christ of Latter Day Saints	40 members; headquartered in Independence, Missouri	Largely composed of former members of the RLDS Church who oppose what they consider to be recent doctrinal innovations, especially the giving of the priesthood to women in 1984.
Lundgren Group	Jeffrey Lundgren	1988	Reorganized Church of Jesus Christ of Latter Day Saints	Defunct; approximately 20 followers; headquartered in Kirtland, Ohio	The denomination broke off from the RLDS Church when Lundgren was dismissed from the church on October 10, 1988. Lundgren was executed by the state of Ohio on October 24, 2006, for the murder of Dennis Avery and four of his family members.
Restoration Church of Jesus Christ of Latter Day Saints	Several RLDS entities	1991	Reorganized Church of Jesus Christ of Latter Day Saints	Headquartered in Independence, Missouri	The church broke off from the Community of Christ because of its belief that women should not hold the priesthood.
Remnant Church of Jesus Christ of Latter Day Saints	Frederick N. Larsen	2000	Independent RLDS / Restoration Branches	1,000–2,000 members; headquartered in Independence, Missouri	Chiefly composed of former members of the RLDS Church who were part of the Independent RLDS / Restoration Branches. They oppose what they consider to be recent doctrinal innovations, especially the passing of the church presidency to someone not descended from Joseph Smith (Larsen is a descendant of Smith through his grandson Frederick Madison Smith).

==== Followers of Granville Hedrick ("Hedrickites") ====
The Church of Christ (Temple Lot) and related churches tracing their leadership through Granville Hedrick.

Name	Organized by	Date	Split off / Continuation of	Current status	Notes
Church of Christ (Temple Lot)	Granville Hedrick	1863	Church of Jesus Christ of Latter Day Saints; some members from Gladdenites	5,000 members; headquartered on the Temple Lot in Independence, Missouri	Owns the Temple Lot; adherents commonly referred to as "Hedrickites".
Church of Christ (Fettingite)	Otto Fetting	1929	Church of Christ (Temple Lot)	Denomination divided into various factions	A denomination which split with the Temple Lot church over reported revelations from John the Baptist to its founder, Otto Fetting; adopted seventh day sabbatarianism under Apostle S.T. Bronson in 1950s.
Church of Christ at Halley's Bluff	Thomas B. Nerren and E. E. Long	1932	Church of Christ (Temple Lot)	Headquartered at Schell City, Missouri; less than 100 members	Members originally believed Otto Fetting's revelations but did not join the Church of Christ (Fettingite). Formally named "Church of Christ at Zion's Retreat" until a 1972 schism in which Dan Gayman led most of its followers away to his Church of Israel.
Church of Christ (Restored)	A.C. DeWolf	ca. 1937	Church of Christ (Fettingite)	Louisiana, Mississippi, Missouri;approx. 450 members	Split from Fettingite organization in late 1930s when that denomination initially accepted William Draves' "messages"; claims to be the true continuation of Fetting's church. Non-sabbatarian.
Church of Christ with the Elijah Message	Otto Fetting and William Draves	1943	Church of Christ (Fettingite)	c. 12,500 members worldwide as of 1987. Headquartered in Independence, Missouri	Split with the Church of Christ (Fettingite) when that denomination rejected revelations from John the Baptist given to its founder, William Draves, following the death of Otto Fetting.
Church of Christ (Hancock)	Pauline Hancock	1946	Church of Christ (Temple Lot)	Defunct as of 1984	First Latter Day Saint denomination to be established by a woman; accepted KJV Bible and Book of Mormon only; later rejected Book of Mormon and dissolved itself in 1984. Among its former members were Jerald and Sandra Tanner, opponents of the Latter Day Saint movement and founders of the Utah Lighthouse Ministry.
Church of Christ	Howard Leighton-Floyd and H. H. Burt	1965	Church of Christ with the Elijah Message	Around 35 members	Leighton-Floyd and Burt split with the Church of Christ with the Elijah Message during the reincorporation of that church under its present name. Leighton-Floyd left shortly after the formation, with Burt assumed leadership of the group. The membership is centered on an agricultural cooperative near Holden, Missouri.
Church of Israel	Dan Gayman	1972	Church of Christ at Halley's Bluff	Headquartered in Missouri	Name was "Church of Our Christian Heritage" until incorporation in 1981. The church has been accused of being a Christian Identity church, a charge which is denied by Gayman. Few Latter Day Saint beliefs or practices remain in the church.
The Church of Christ With the Elijah Message, The Assured Way of the Lord, Inc.	Leonard Draves	2004	Church of Christ with the Elijah Message	Headquartered in Independence, Missouri	Split from the Church of Christ with the Elijah Message, Inc., which in turn split from the Church of Christ With the Elijah Message; founders claim that they are the legitimate continuation of William Draves' organization.

==== Followers of Sidney Rigdon or William Bickerton ("Bickertonites") ====
Churches tracing their leadership through Sidney Rigdon or William Bickerton.

Name	Organized by	Date	Split off / Continuation of	Current status	Notes
Church of Jesus Christ of the Children of Zion	Sidney Rigdon	1844	Church of Jesus Christ of Latter Day Saints	Dissolved by 1847	Originally also used the name "Church of Christ". Also known as Rigdonites.
The Church of Jesus Christ (Bickertonite)	William Bickerton	1862	Organized by former members of the Church of Jesus Christ of the Children of Zion (Rigdonites), by then defunct	19,029 as of December 31, 2012; headquartered in Monongahela, Pennsylvania	Adherents commonly referred to as Bickertonites (church actively opposes use of this term).
Reorganized Church of Jesus Christ (Bickertonite)	Half of the Bickertonite Quorum of Twelve Apostles	1907	Church of Jesus Christ (Bickertonite)	Defunct	Dispute over nature of life in the millennium split Bickertonite Quorum of the Twelve in two; later merged with the Primitive Church of Jesus Christ (Bickertonite).
Primitive Church of Jesus Christ (Bickertonite)	James Caldwell	1914	Church of Jesus Christ (Bickertonite)	Defunct	Rejected the First Presidency as a valid leadership organization of the church; later merged with the Reorganized Church of Jesus Christ (Bickertonite).

==== Followers of Alpheus Cutler ("Cutlerites") ====
The Church of Jesus Christ (Cutlerite) and related churches tracing their leadership through Alpheus Cutler.

Name	Organized by	Date	Split off / Continuation of	Current status	Notes
Church of Jesus Christ (Cutlerite)	Alpheus Cutler	1853	Church of Jesus Christ of Latter Day Saints	Approximately 5 members (2024); headquartered in Independence, Missouri	Adherents commonly called "Cutlerites"; practice "United Order"; retains Nauvoo-era Temple endowment and Baptism for the Dead.
True Church of Jesus Christ (Cutlerite)	Clyde Fletcher	1953	Church of Jesus Christ (Cutlerite)	Never more than 10; headquartered in Clitherall, Minnesota	Split from Cutlerites over presidential succession issue; church folded with death of its founder in 1969 and schism was subsequently healed.
Restored Church of Jesus Christ	Eugene O. Walton	1980	Church of Jesus Christ (Cutlerite)	25 members; headquartered in Independence, Missouri	Split from Cutlerites when they rejected Walton's claim to be the "One Mighty and Strong".

==== Followers of James J. Strang ("Strangites") ====
The Church of Jesus Christ of Latter Day Saints (Strangite) and related churches tracing their leadership through James Strang.

Name	Organized by	Date	Split off / Continuation of	Current status	Notes
Church of Jesus Christ of Latter Day Saints (Strangite)	James J. Strang	1844	Church of Jesus Christ of Latter Day Saints	A few hundred members; headquartered in Voree (now Burlington), Wisconsin	Currently split between proponents and opponents of incorporation in 1961. Anti-incorporation factions headquartered in Shreveport, Louisiana and Independence, Missouri
Church of Christ (Aaron Smith)	Aaron Smith	1846	Church of Jesus Christ of Latter Day Saints (Strangite)	Defunct	Short-lived denomination formed in Voree, Wisconsin.
Church of the Messiah	George J. Adams	1861	Church of Jesus Christ of Latter Day Saints (Strangite)	Defunct	Led followers from Maine to Palestine; attempt to establish mission there failed.
Holy Church of Jesus Christ	Alexandre R. Caffiaux	1964	Church of Jesus Christ of Latter Day Saints (Strangite)	Defunct	Caffiaux claimed to be the rightful successor to James J. Strang. Church headquartered in France.
Church of Jesus Christ (Drewite)	Theron Drew	1965	Church of Jesus Christ of Latter Day Saints (Strangite)	Extant; one congregation led by Richard Drew, Theron's son	Drew organized the church after being excommunicated from the Strangite church, on account of Drew's promotion of Merl Kilgore as the "One Mighty and Strong" and a potential successor to James Strang.
True Church of Jesus Christ Restored	David Roberts	1974	Church of Christ with the Elijah Message and the Church of Jesus Christ of Latter Day Saints (Strangite)	Headquartered in Independence, Missouri	Difficult to categorize; Roberts claimed to be Strang's successor.

==== Additional Latter Day Saint churches (usually headquartered in U.S. east of the Rocky Mountains) ====
Other "Prairie Saint" branches of the movement, such as the Church of Christ (Whitmerite), none of which is known to be extant.

Name	Organized by	Date	Split off / Continuation of	Current status	Notes
Church of Christ (Wightite)	Lyman Wight	1844	Church of Jesus Christ of Latter Day Saints	Extant until around 1858	Wight rejected the claims of leadership made by Brigham Young, William Smith, and James Strang. He moved a group of Latter Day Saints to the central Texas frontier. He accepted Joseph Smith III as his father's successor, but did not live long enough to join the RLDS Church (though most of his followers later did).
Church of Christ (Whitmerite)	William E. McLellin and David Whitmer	1847 and 1871	Church of Jesus Christ of Latter Day Saints	Extant until around 1925	William E. McLellin claimed that Joseph Smith had designated David Whitmer, one of the Three Witnesses, as his successor. By 1925, most remaining members of the Whitmerite church had united with the Church of Christ (Temple Lot).
Church of Christ (Brewsterite)	James C. Brewster and Hazen Aldrich	1848	Church of Jesus Christ of Latter Day Saints	Defunct	Published a periodical entitled The Olive Branch.
The Bride, the Lamb's Wife	Jacob Syfritt	1848	Church of Jesus Christ of Latter Day Saints	Defunct	Syfritt claimed to have been taken to heaven to converse with Joseph Smith, who designated him as his true successor.
Congregation of Jehovah's Presbytery of Zion	Charles B. Thompson	1848	Church of Jesus Christ of Latter Day Saints	Defunct	Also called Baneemyites and Conjespresites. Thompson claimed to be "Baneemy" mentioned in The Doctrine and Covenants, D&C 105:27. Said the church had been rejected by God following Joseph Smith's death, and he had been called to renew the priesthood among the gentiles.
Church of Jesus Christ of Latter Day Saints (Gladdenite)	Gladden Bishop	1851	Church of Jesus Christ of Latter Day Saints	Dissolved after Bishop's death in 1865	Many members later helped to form the Church of Christ (Temple Lot).
Pentecostal Church of Jesus Christ of Latter-day Saints	Mike Bethel	1994	The Church of Jesus Christ of Latter-day Saints	Extant as of 1998; status currently unknown	The denomination holds to the canonicity of the Bible and the Book of Mormon, but does not accept other texts in the Latter Day Saint movement such as the Pearl of Great Price and Doctrine and Covenants.

=== Spontaneous or unknown lineage ===
Those denominations which originated independent from other organizations and do not trace their doctrinal or priesthood lineage to any 19th-century Latter Day Saint factions, but still hold Latter Day Saint beliefs.

Name	Organized by	Date	Split off / Continuation of	Current status	Notes
Independent Latter Day Saint congregations in Nigeria	Anie D. Obot	c. 1953	Church of Jesus Christ of Latter Day Saints (with LDS Church influences)	Extant until around 1978	After LDS Church missionaries visited the town of Uyo in 1953, Obot decided to form unauthorized branches of the church in Nigeria and wrote for more information to church headquarters in Salt Lake City, Utah. However, due to Nigerian government visas restrictions and the absence of church leadership, these branches deviated from LDS Church doctrine. This included some practicing of polygamy and establishing their own black priesthood hierarchy, both of which were prohibited at the time by church doctrine.
Independent Latter Day Saint congregations in Ghana	Joseph W. B. Johnson	1964	Church of Jesus Christ of Latter Day Saints (with LDS and RLDS influences)	Extant until around 1978	Upon receiving a copy of the Book of Mormon, Johnson started "Latter day Saint" congregations in Ghana independent from any Latter Day Saint denomination. In 1976, Johnson went to find "The Mormons" (i.e., the LDS Church) and found the RLDS Church instead. However, no further contact was established with the RLDS Church. Upon the announcement of the 1978 Revelation on Priesthood, allowing those of black African descent into the priesthood, Johnson and most of his group were baptized into the LDS Church.
Apostolic Divine Church of Ghana	Cape Coast group of the independent Latter-Day Saint congregations in Ghana	1976	Independent Latter-Day Saint congregations in Ghana	Extant for only a few months	The Cape Coast group of the independent Latter Day Saint congregations in Ghana (Johnson) schismed when ongoing contact was not established with the LDS Church or RLDS Church in 1976. Some of the individuals in this group formed the Apostolic Divine Church of Ghana, however, this denomination lasted only a few months.
Remnant movement	Spontaneously formed around the teachings of Denver C. Snuffer Jr.	2010s	Affiliated fellowship groups in schism with the mainstream LDS Church		As of 2017, has 5,000–10,000 adherents with adherents meeting in about fifty fellowships worldwide
Church of Jesus Christ in Christian Fellowship (The Fellowship of Christ)	David Ferriman	2015	Separated itself from the mainstream LDS Church, considers itself "non-denominational Mormon".		A self-described "non-denominational Latter Day Saint/Mormon ecumenical Christian universalist church" organized by former Ohio Church of Jesus Christ of Latter-day Saints (Brighamite) David Ferriman on November 6, 2015. He earlier stated he was ordained a high priest by archangel Raphael around 2013 and had not received a call from within the church, later leaving it to establish an independent ministry. The group accepts the Bible, Book of Mormon, the Book of the Law of the Lord (translated by James J. Strang), and other revelations given to both historical and present Latter Day Saints (not just David and Kristine Ferriman) as scripture, but they do not believe in infallibility, as they profess that "all scripture, when handled by mortal hands, may contain imperfections." In their ecumenism, they also believe that canon is open to everyone and a belief in a specific canon is not a requirement for membership. The group places emphasis on Jewish heritage, using many Jewish symbols and names, mysticism, and the call Ferriman states he received from God in Spring 2018 to "unite the Saints in Kabbalah". It is the only Latter Day Saint church to have simultaneously two leaders (co-presidents), both David Ferriman and his wife, Kristine Ferriman. It is also one of the fewer to be led by a woman.

== Gallery ==
Founders of factions

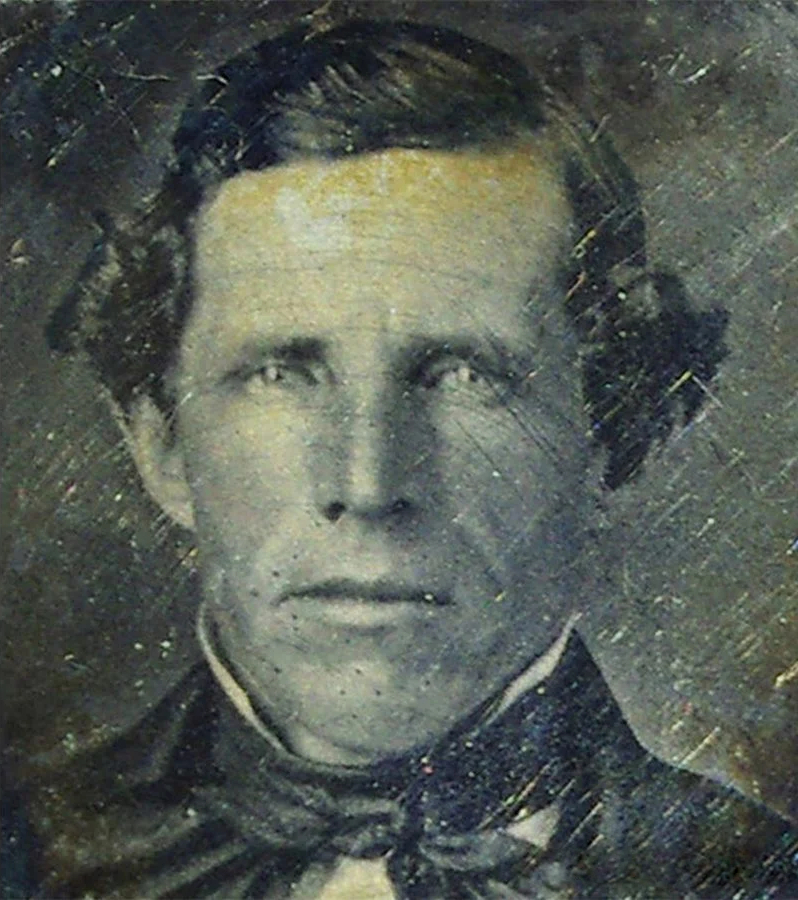
Alleged daguerreotype of Joseph Smith, founder of the Latter Day Saint movement

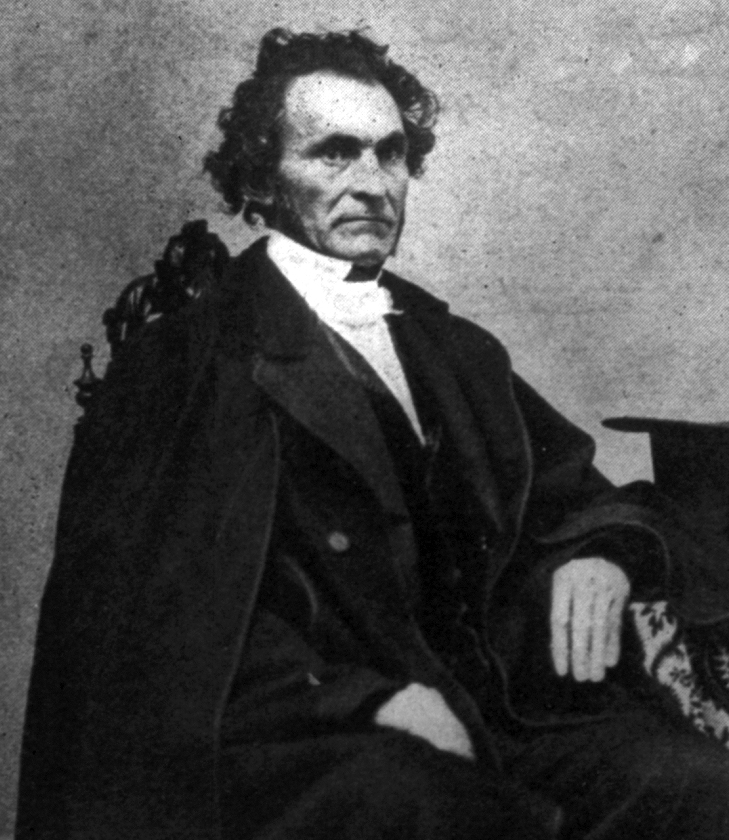
George J. Adams, founder of the Church of the Messiah (George J. Adams)

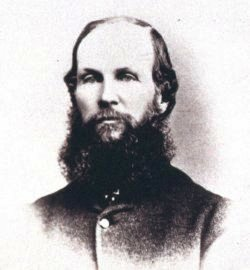
James Brighouse, founder of the Order of Enoch

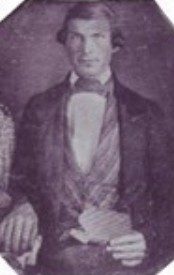
Alpheus Cutler, founder and first president of the Church of Jesus Christ (Cutlerite)

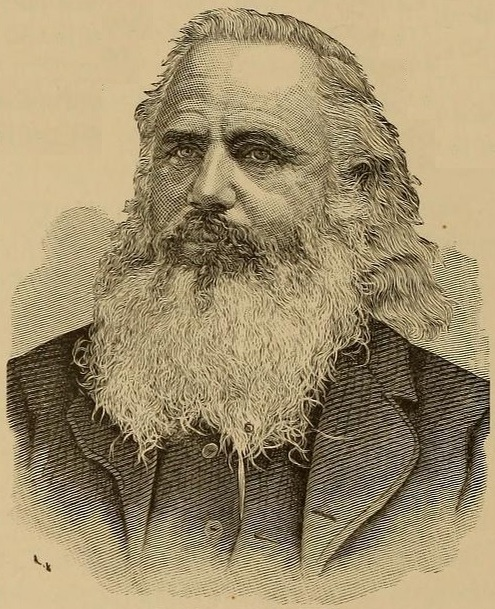
William W. Davies, founder of the Kingdom of Heaven

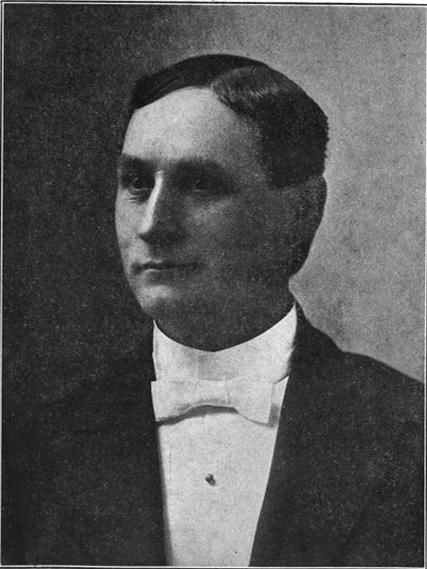
R. C. Evans, founder of the Church of the Christian Brotherhood

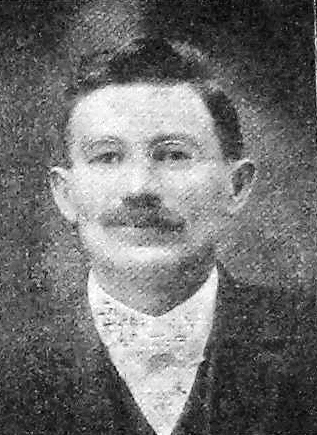
Photo of Otto Fetting, founder of the Church of Christ (Fettingite)

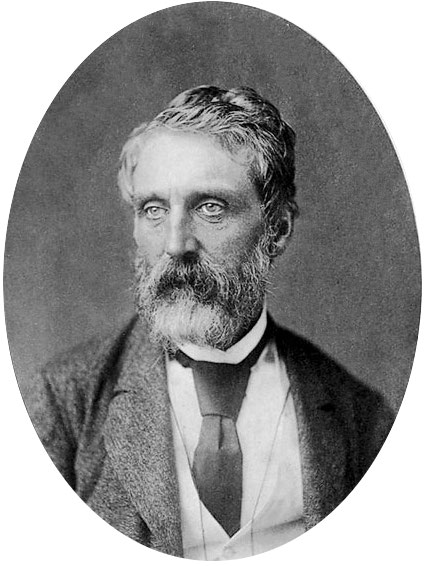
Portrait of Walter M. Gibson, founder of the Church of Jesus Christ of Latter Day Saints (Gibsonite)

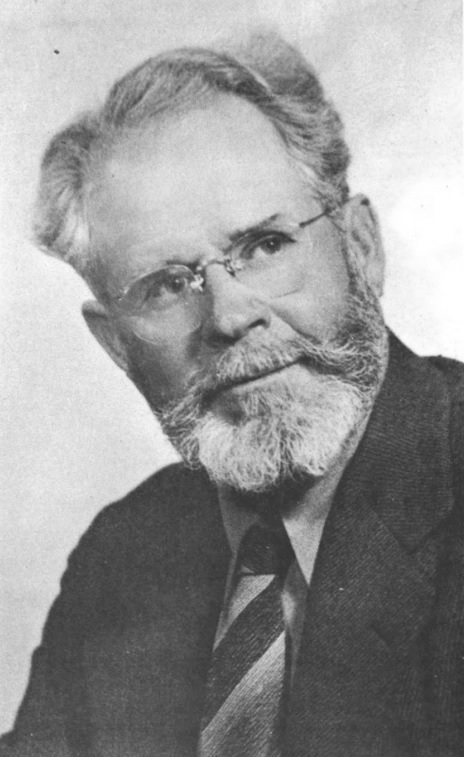
Maurice L. Glendenning, founder of the House of Aaron

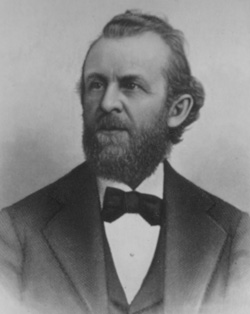
William S. Godbe, founder of The Church of Zion, also called Godbeites

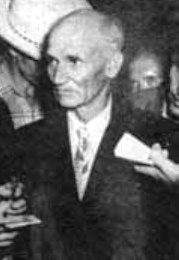
Photo of Leroy S. Johnson, organizer of the Fundamentalist Church of Jesus Christ of Latter-Day Saints

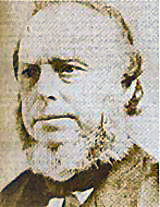
William Law, founder of the True Church of Jesus Christ of Latter Day Saints

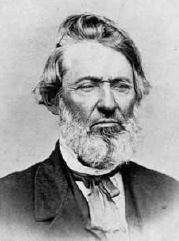
William E. M'Lellin, co-founder of the Church of Christ (Whitmerite)

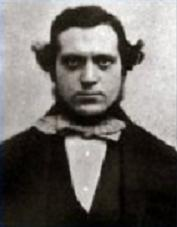
Joseph Morris (Latter Day Saints), founder of the Church of the Firstborn (Morrisite)

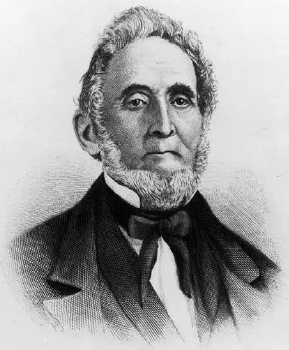
Sidney Rigdon, founder of the Church of Jesus Christ of the Children of Zion

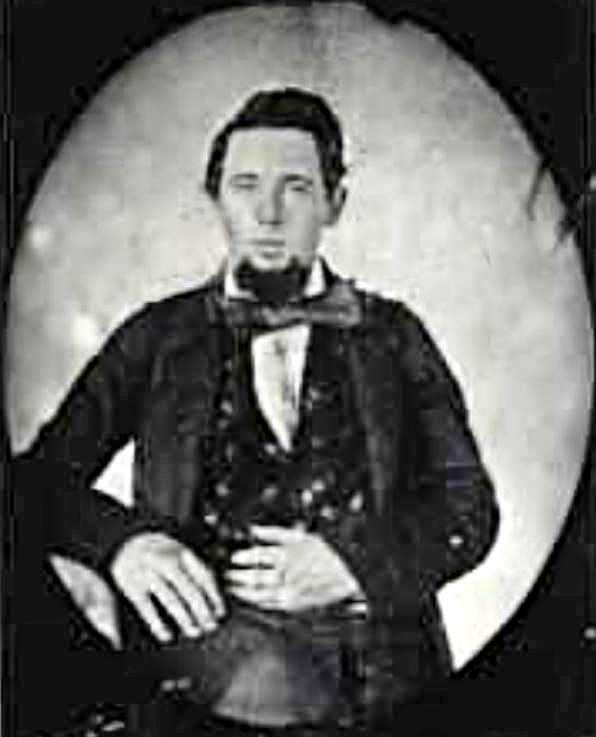
Isaac Russell, founder of the Alston Church

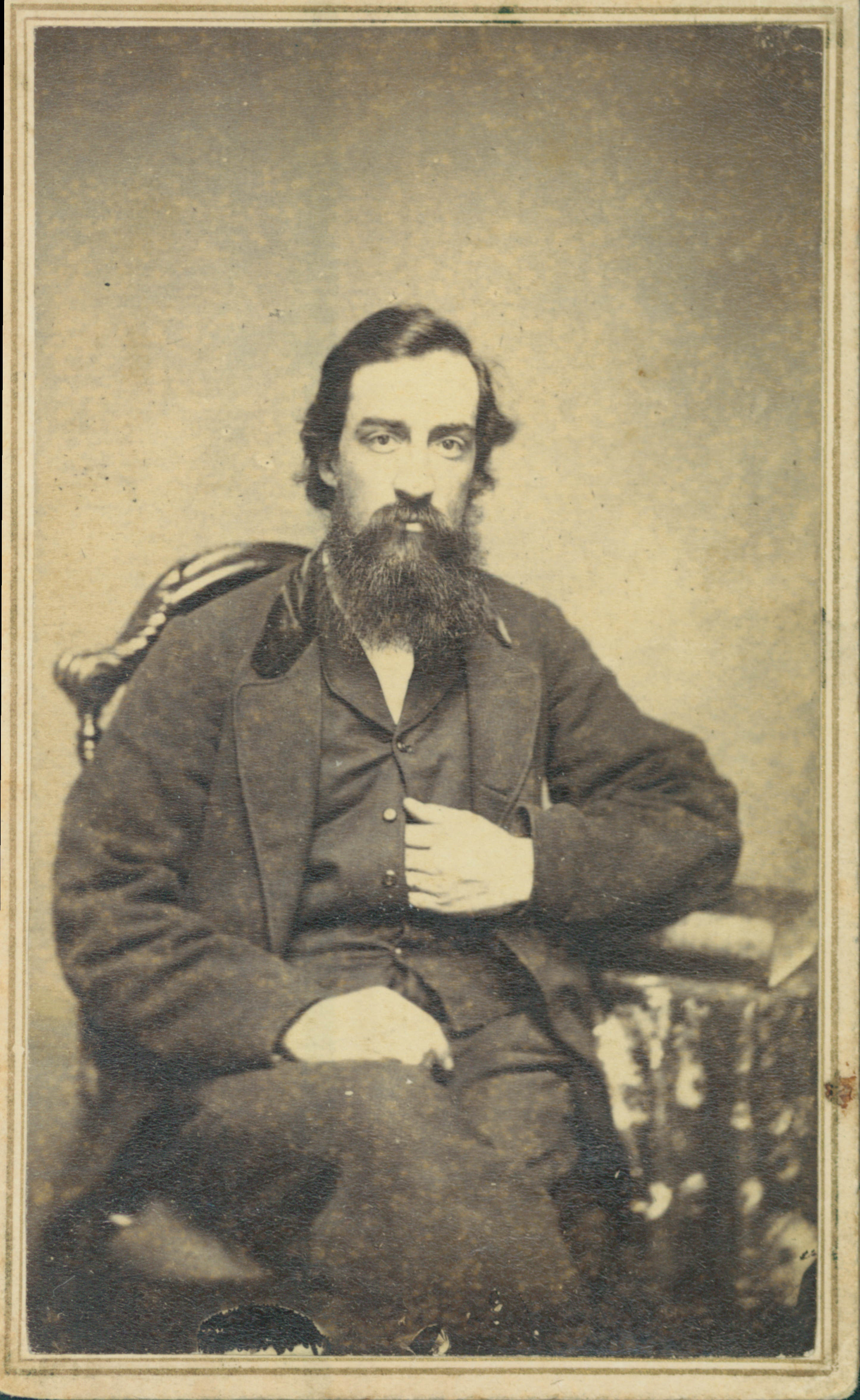
Joseph Smith III, prophet of the Reorganized Church of Jesus Christ of Latter Day Saints (now the Community of Christ)

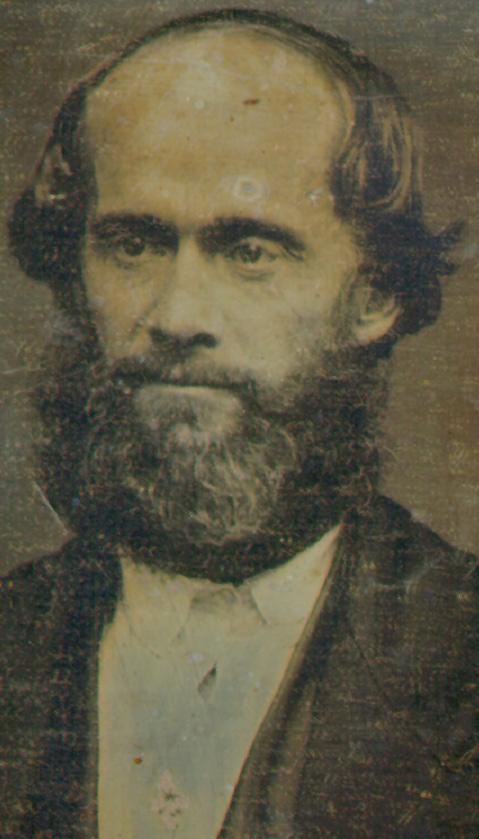
James Strang, founder of the Church of Jesus Christ of Latter Day Saints (Strangite)

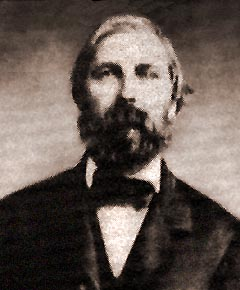
Charles B. Thompson, founder of the Congregation of Jehovah's Presbytery of Zion

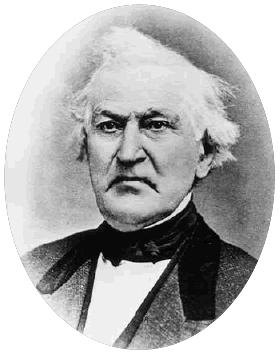
David Whitmer, one of the Three Witnesses and co-founder of the Church of Christ (Whitmerite)

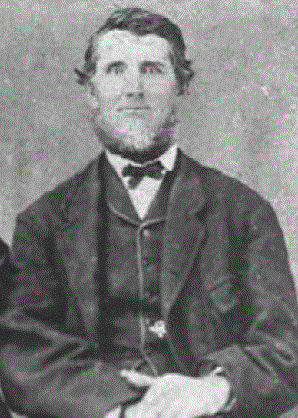
Photo of Lyman Wight, founder of the Church of Christ (Wightite)

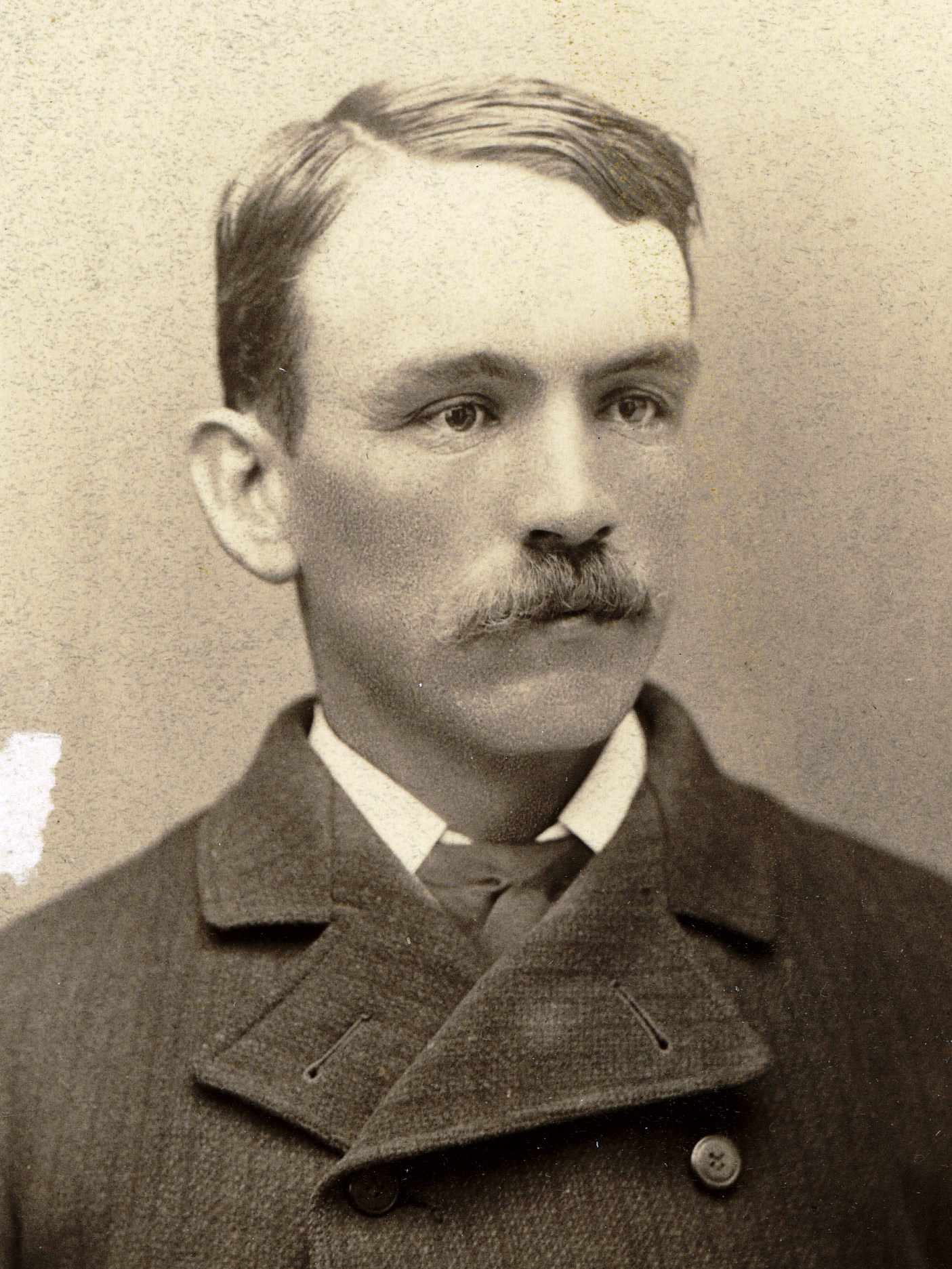
Photo of Lorin C. Woolley, known as the father of Mormon fundamentalism amongst most fundamentalist denominations

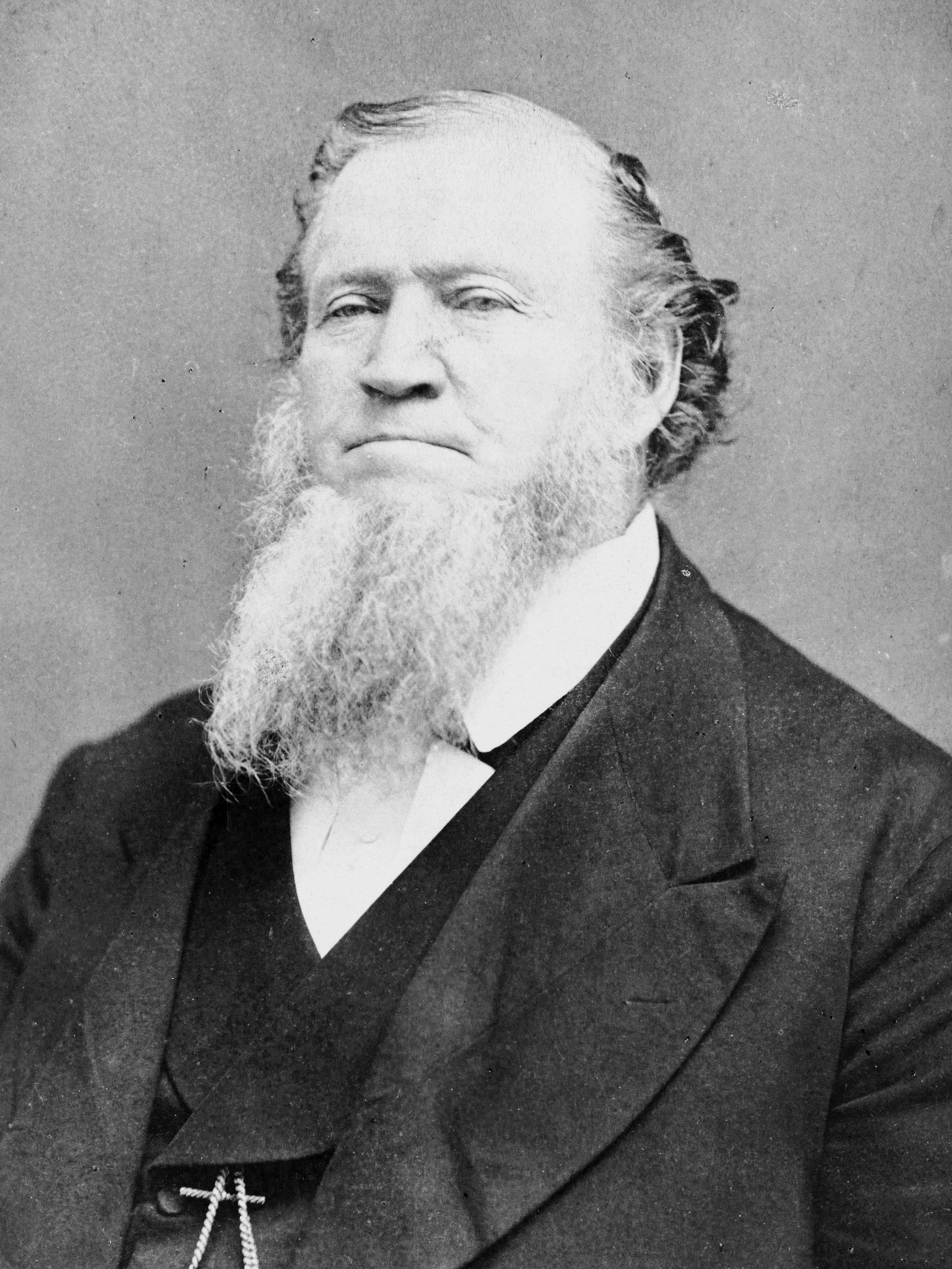
Brigham Young, prophet of the Church of Jesus Christ of Latter-day Saints
Selected houses of worship

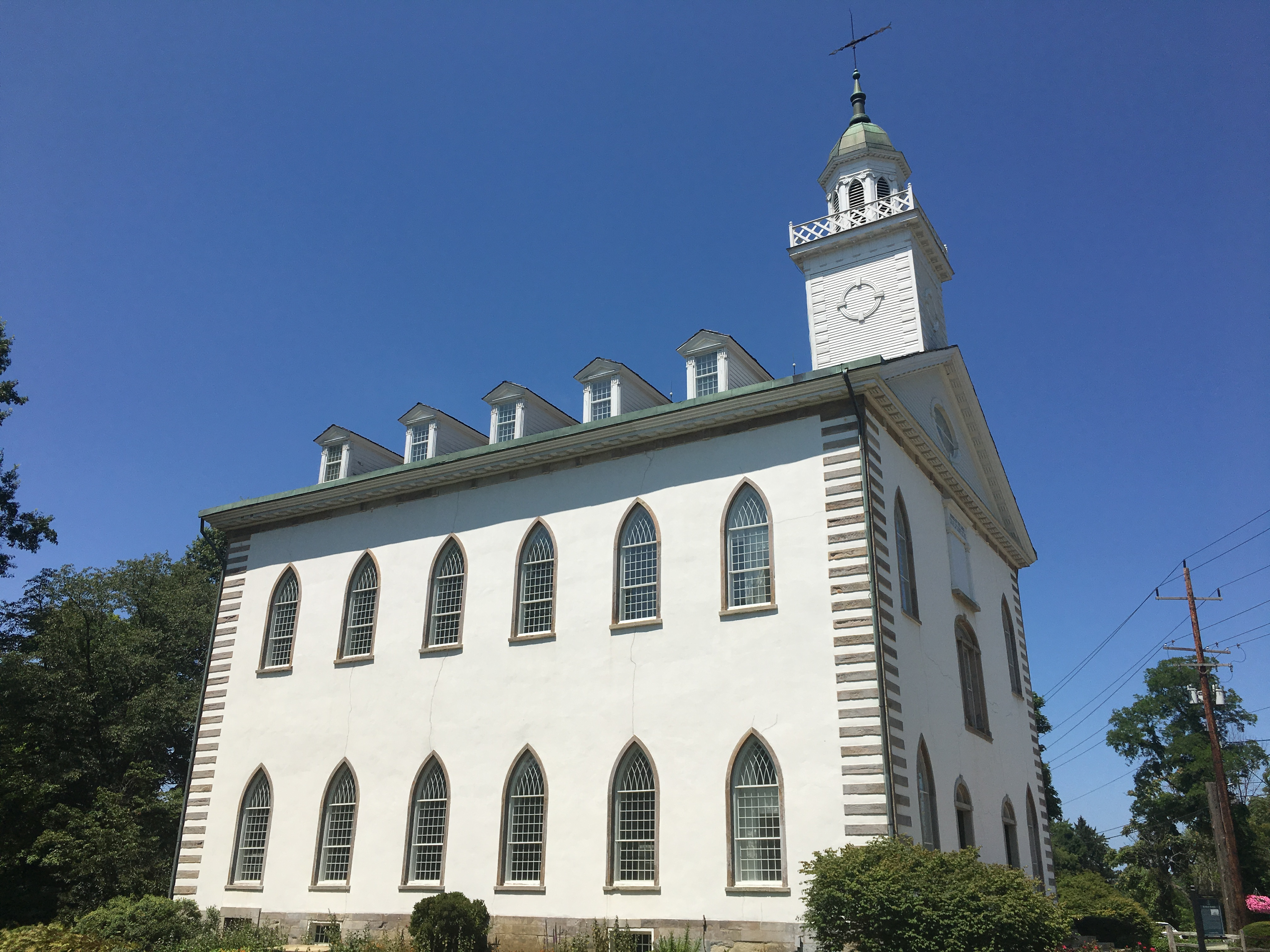
Kirtland Temple Built by Joseph Smith's Church of Christ; passed through hands of several factions after Smith's death; today owned by the LDS Church

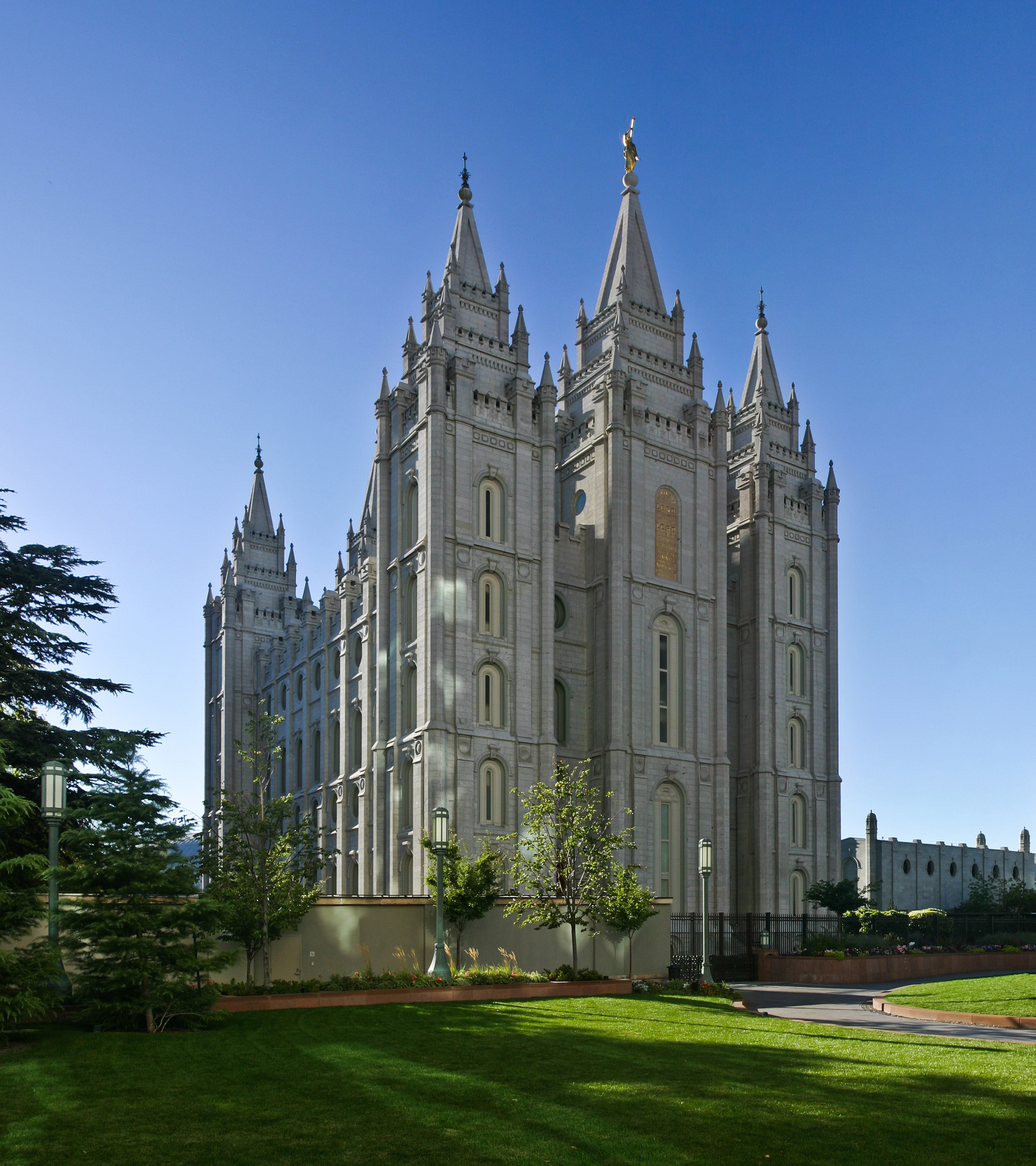
Salt Lake Temple of the LDS Church, in Salt Lake City, Utah

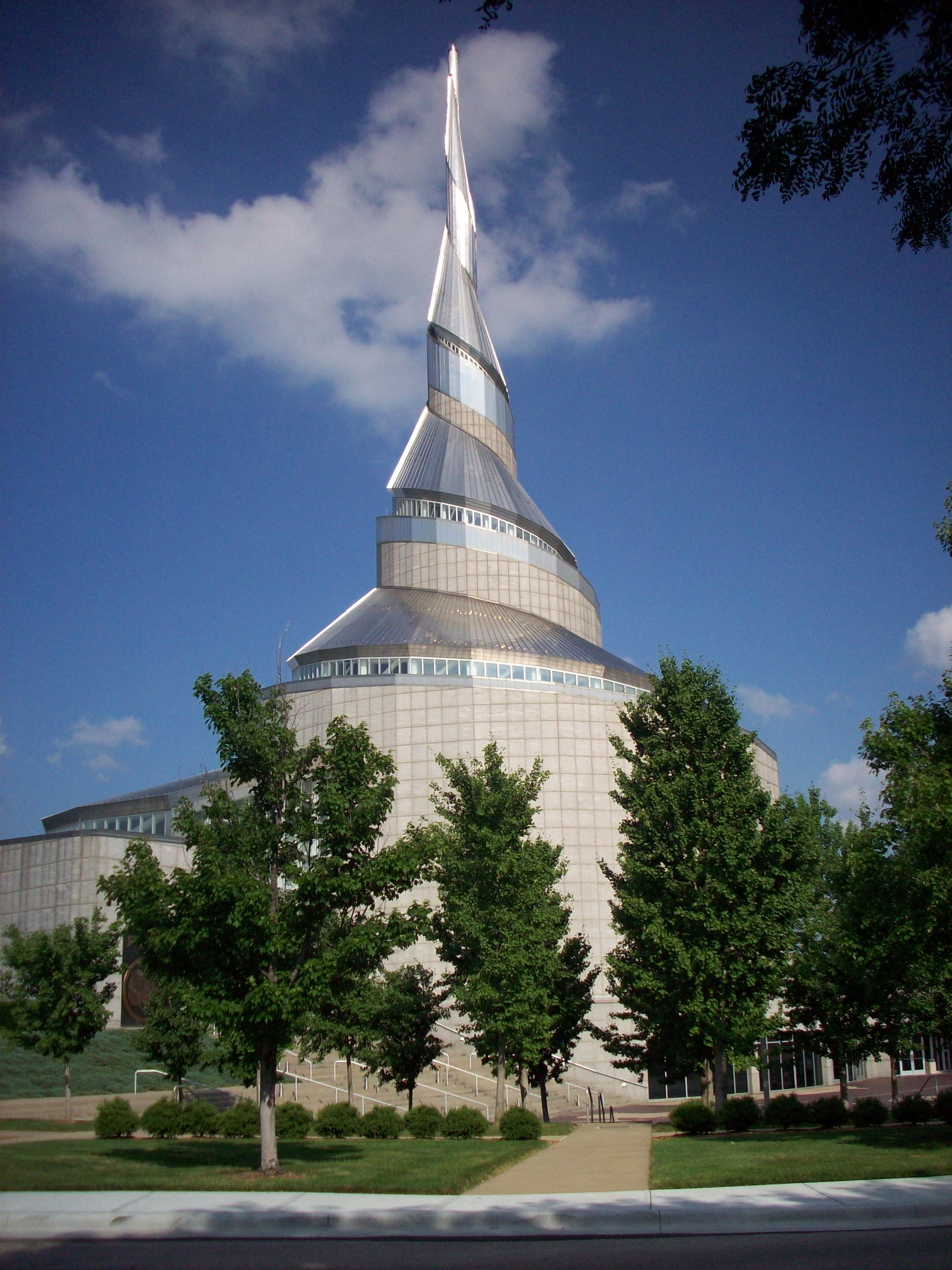
Independence Temple of the Community of Christ, in Independence, Missouri

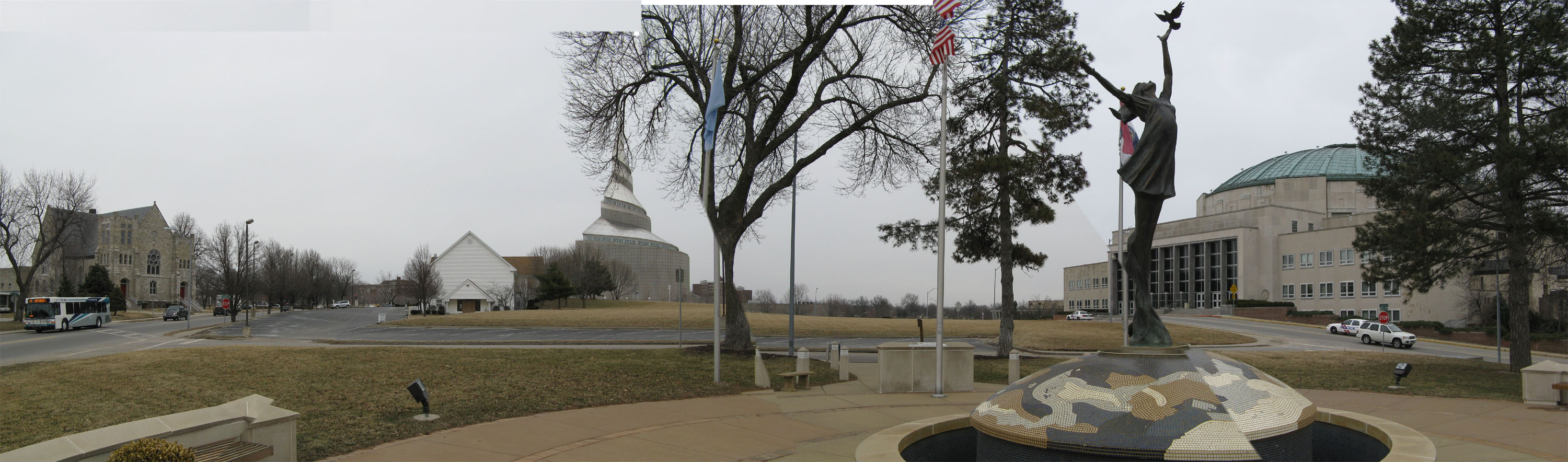
Panorama of the Temple Lot in Independence, with (L to R) the Stone Church, the Temple Lot Church, the Independence Temple, and the Auditorium

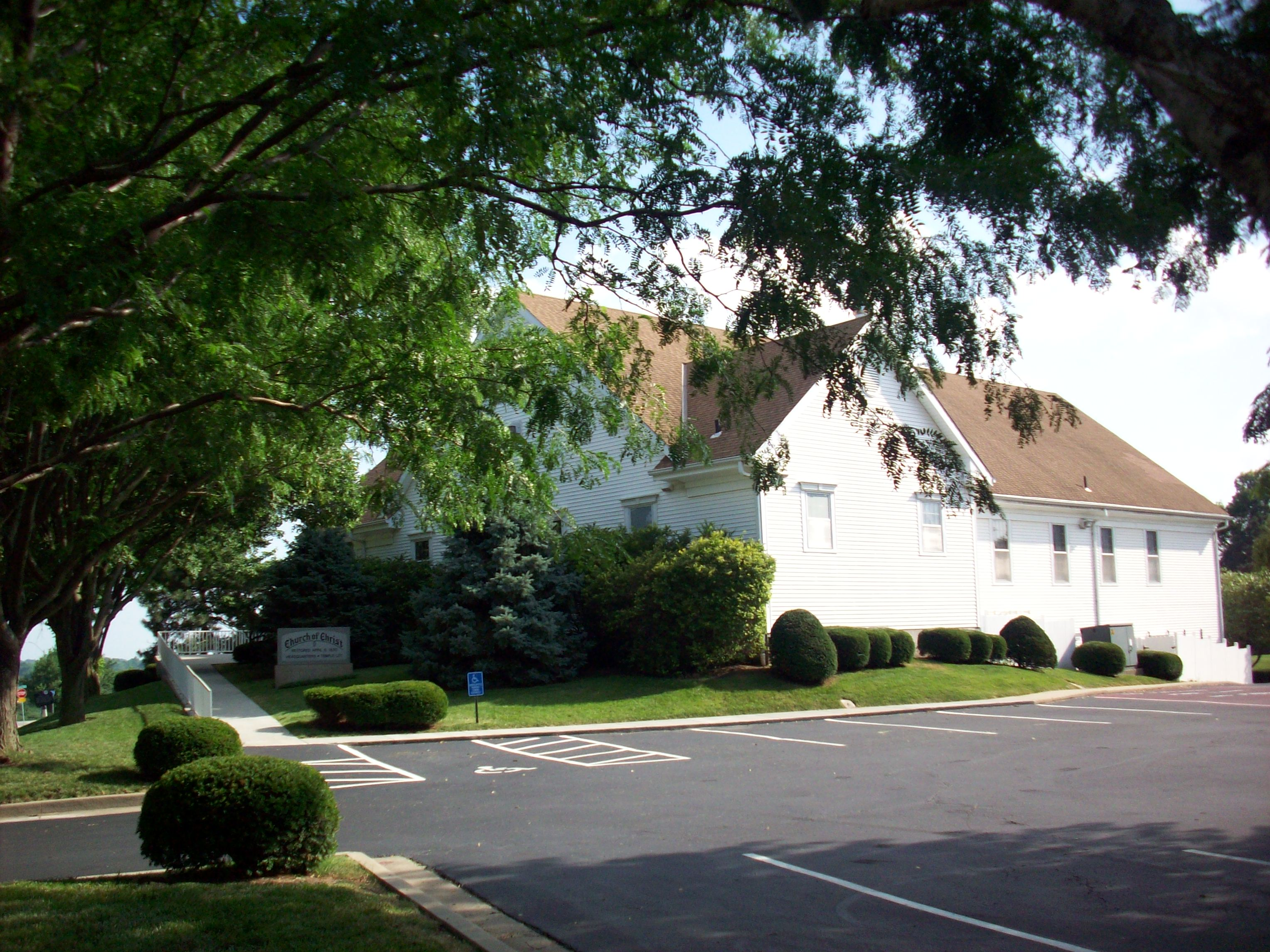
World Headquarters and Independence Branch of the Church of Christ (Temple Lot), located in Independence, Missouri

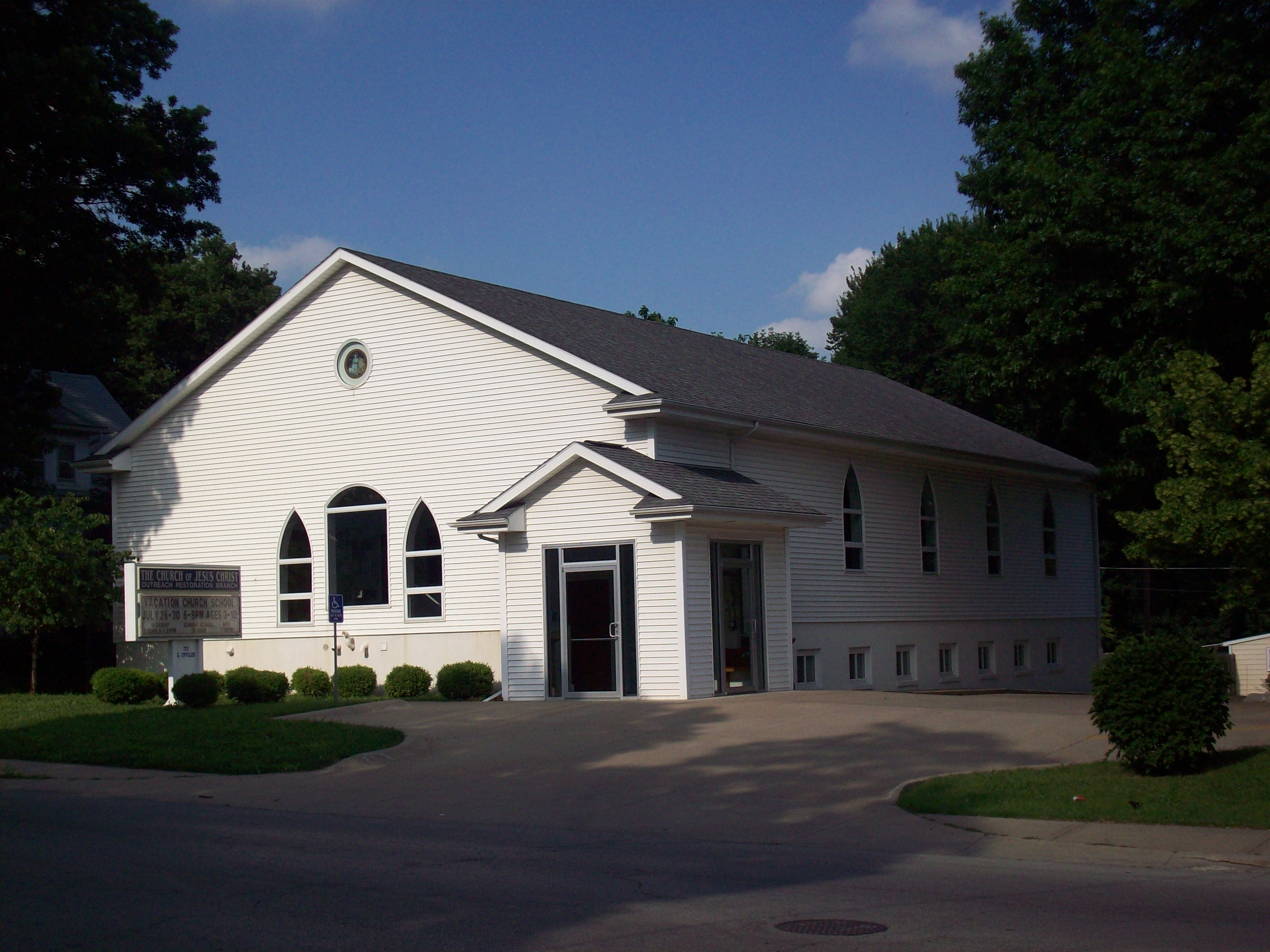
Current location of the Outreach Restoration Branch, in Independence, Missouri. Previously the location of the now-defunct Church of Christ (Hancock).

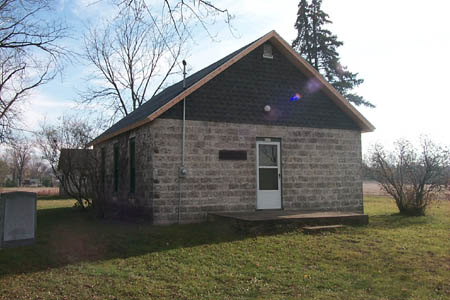
Meetinghouse of Church of Jesus Christ of Latter Day Saints (Strangite), in Voree, Wisconsin

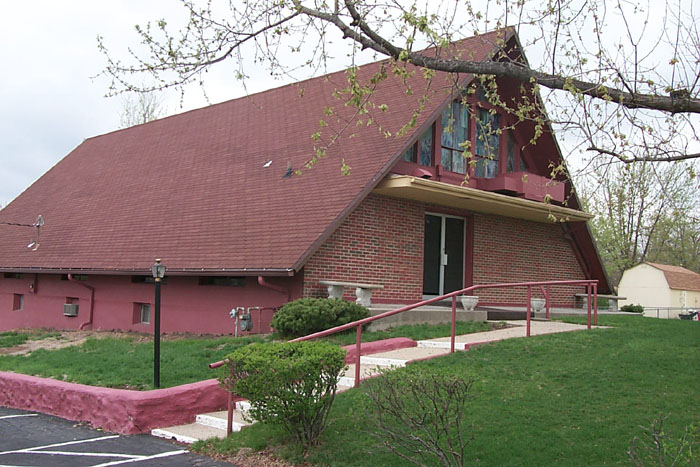
Headquarters and Independence Branch of the Church of Christ with the Elijah Message, in Independence, Missouri

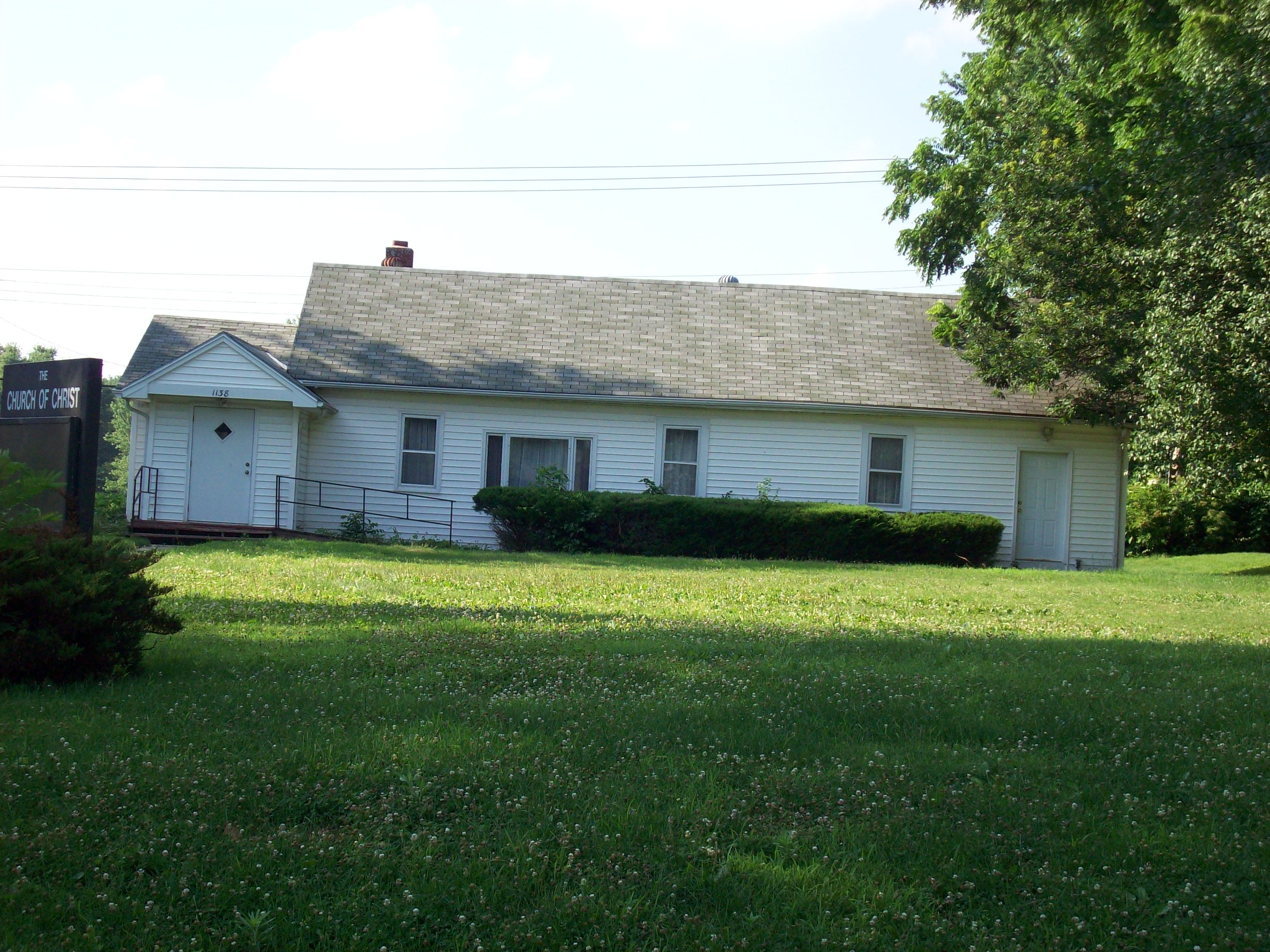
Meetinghouse of the Church of Christ (Fettingite), in Independence, Missouri

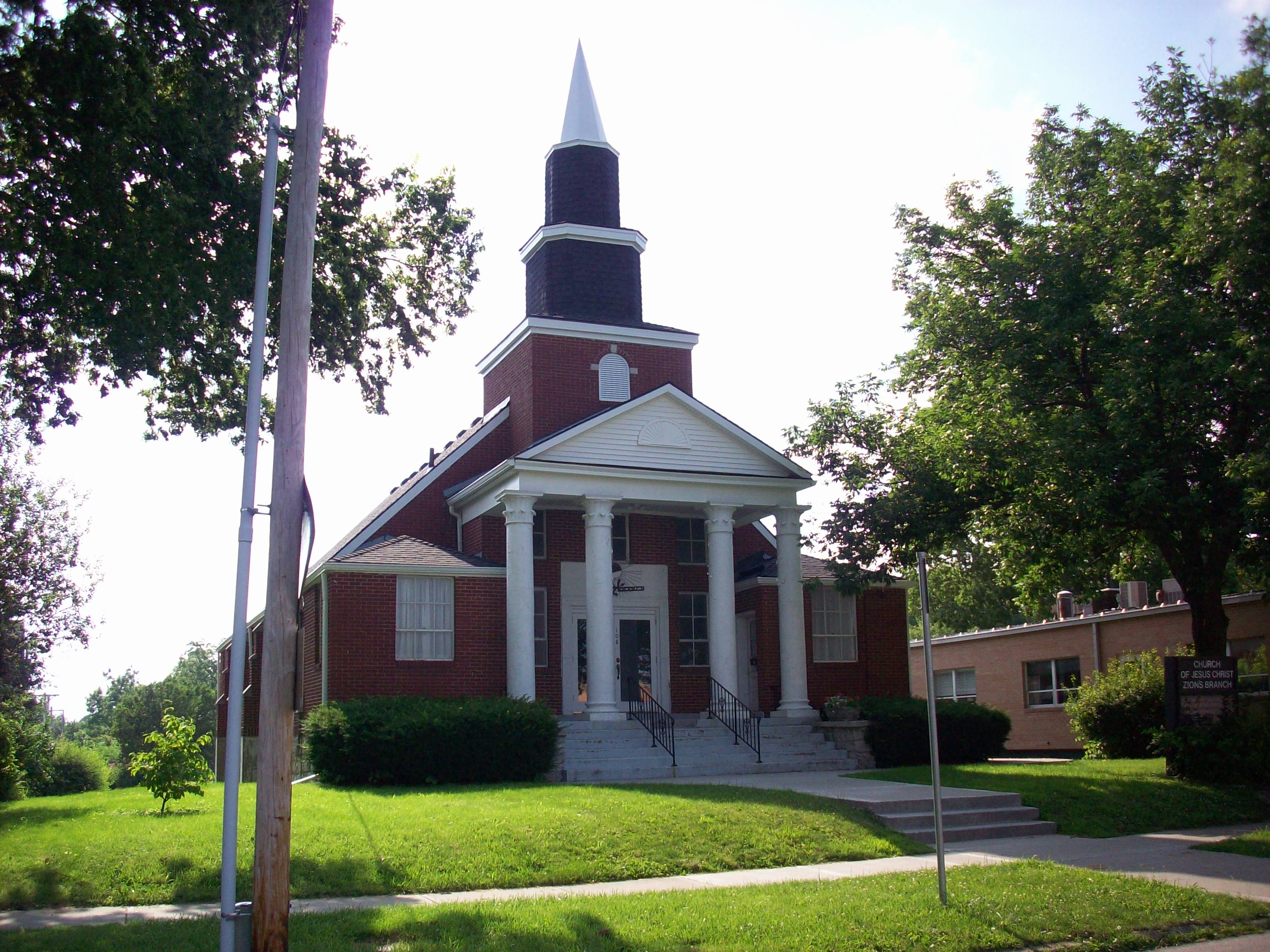
Meetinghouse of the Church of Jesus Christ (Zion's Branch), in Independence, Missouri

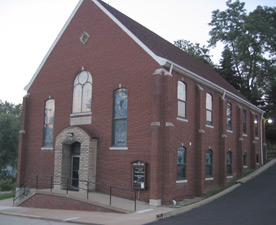
Meetinghouse of the Church of Jesus Christ (Bickertonite) in Monongahela, Pennsylvania

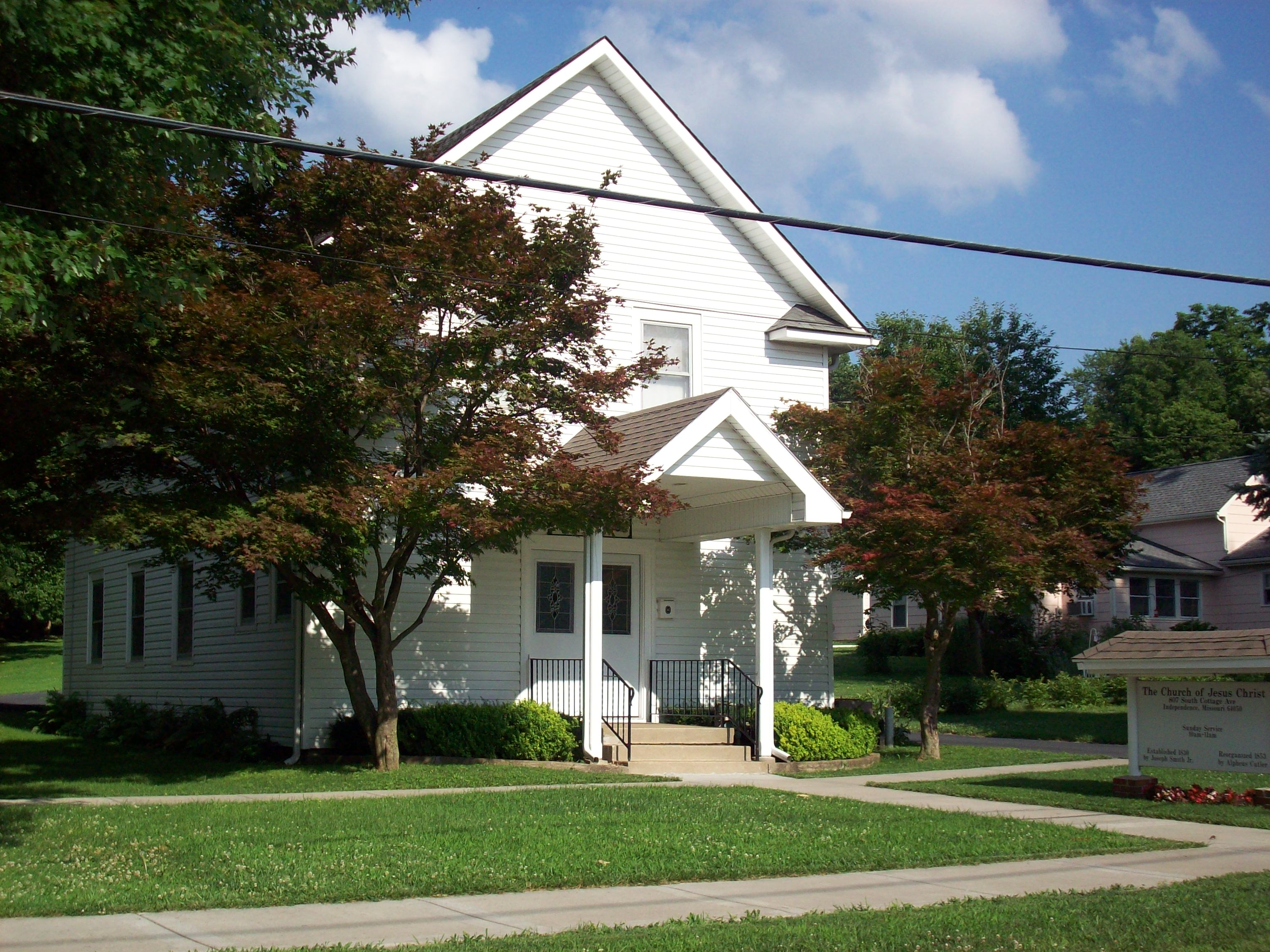
Headquarters and sole branch of the Church of Jesus Christ (Cutlerite) in Independence, Missouri

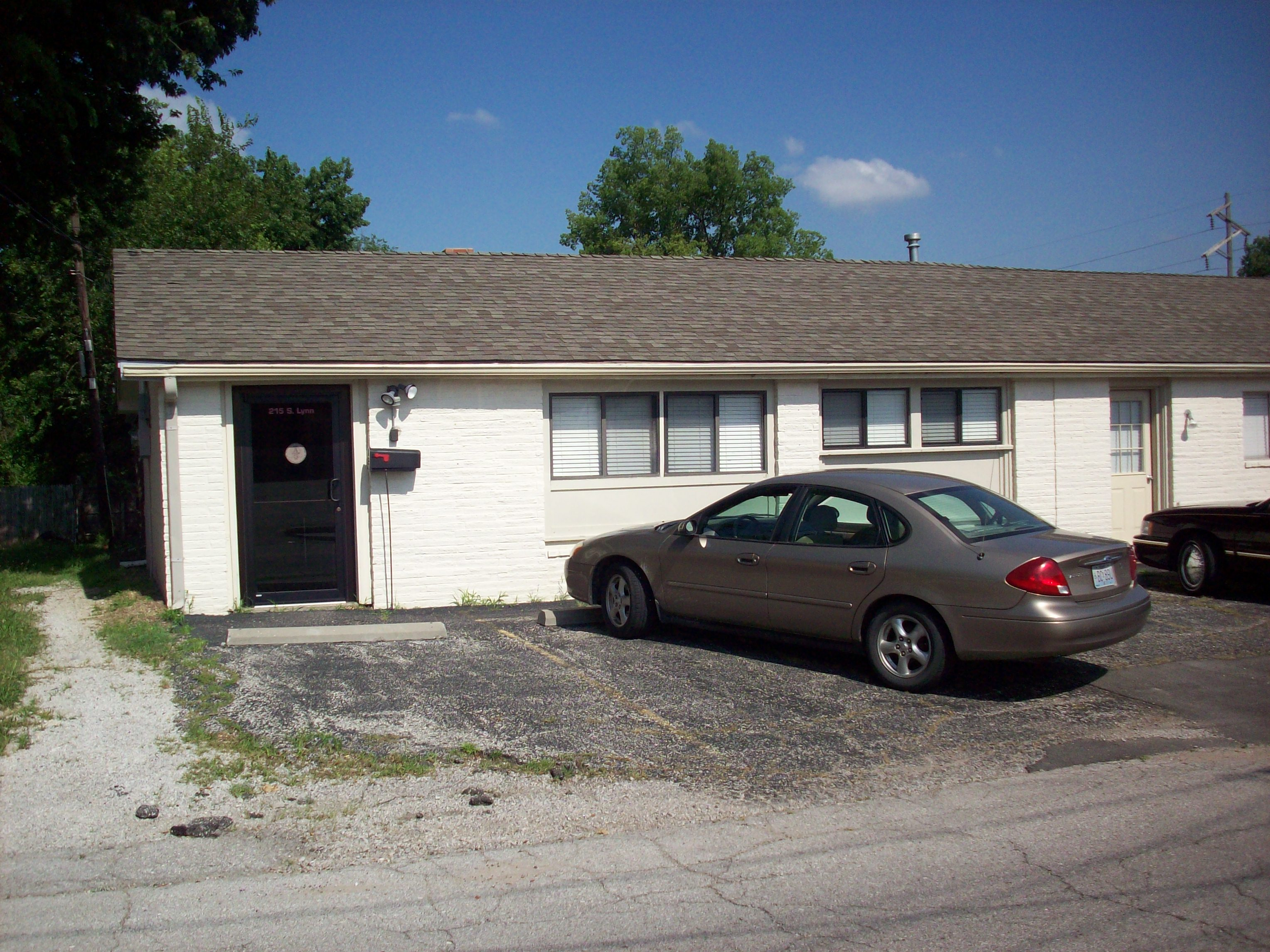
Headquarters of the Church of Christ with the Elijah Message (Assured Way of the Lord), Inc. in Independence, Missouri

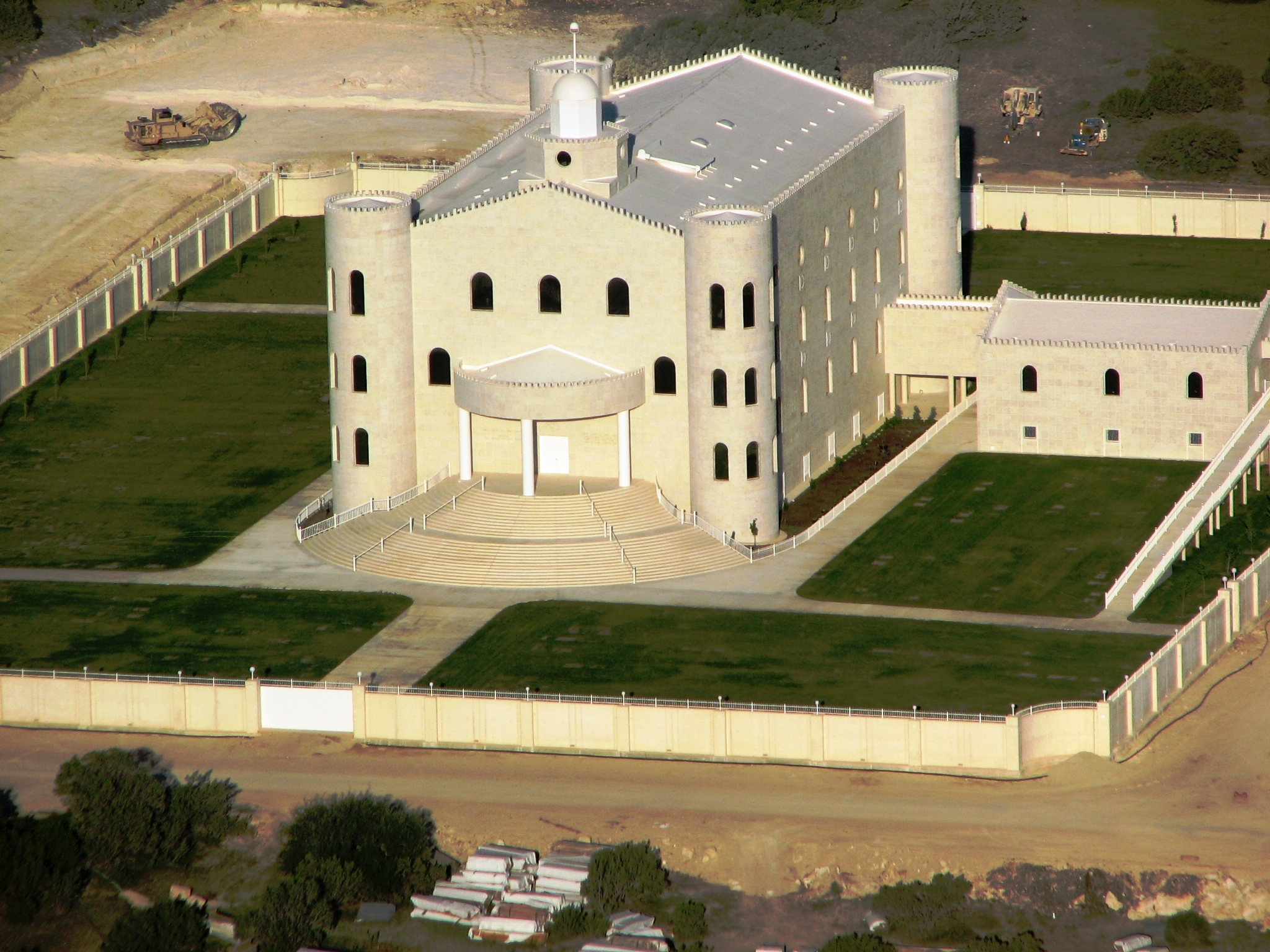
Temple of the Fundamentalist Church of Jesus Christ of Latter-Day Saints in Eldorado, Texas

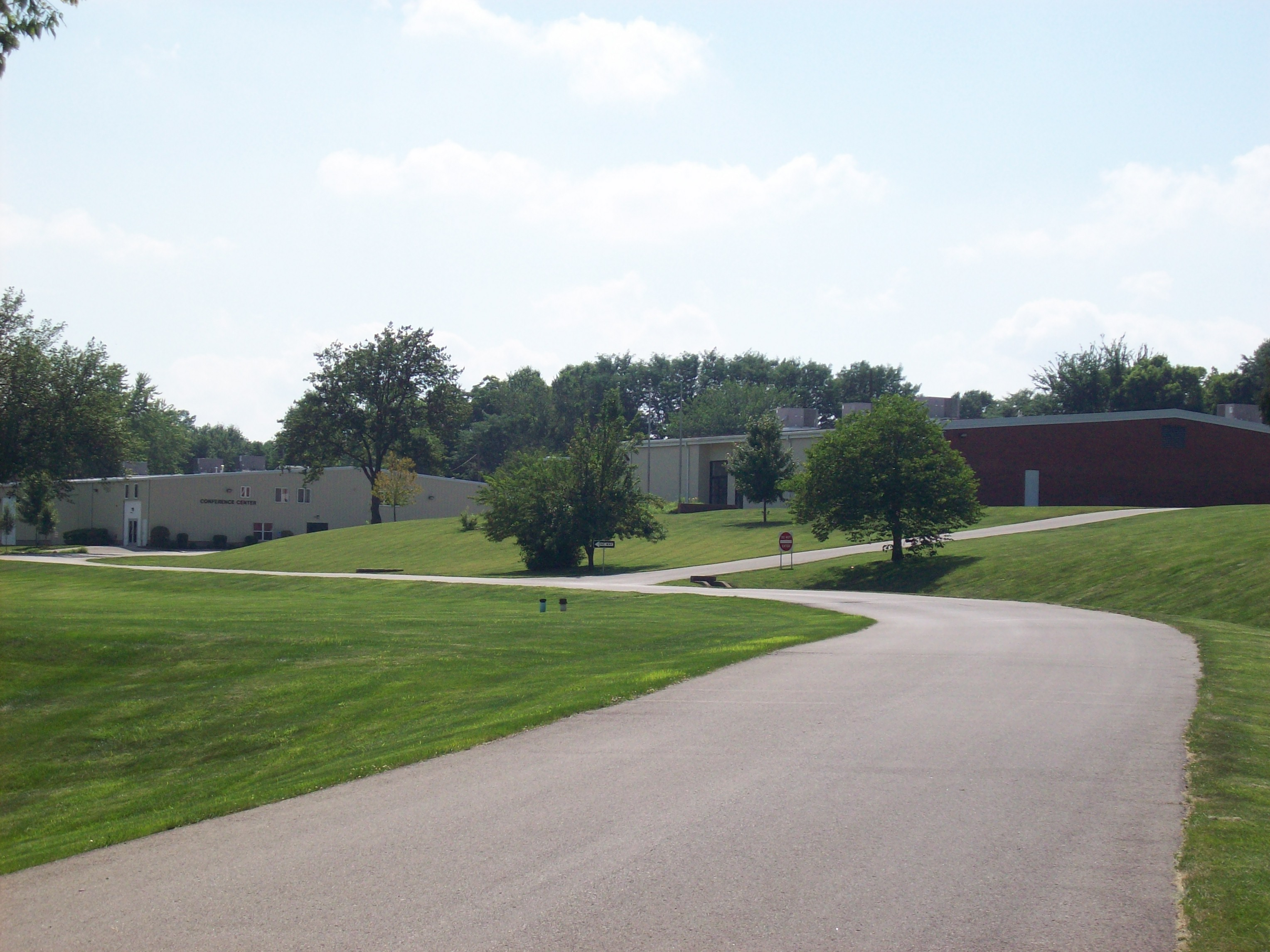
Meetinghouse and Conference Center of the Remnant Church of Jesus Christ of Latter Day Saints, in Independence, Missouri

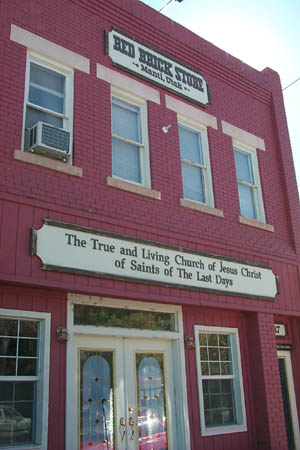
"Red Brick Store" of the True and Living Church of Jesus Christ of Saints of the Last Days in Manti, Utah

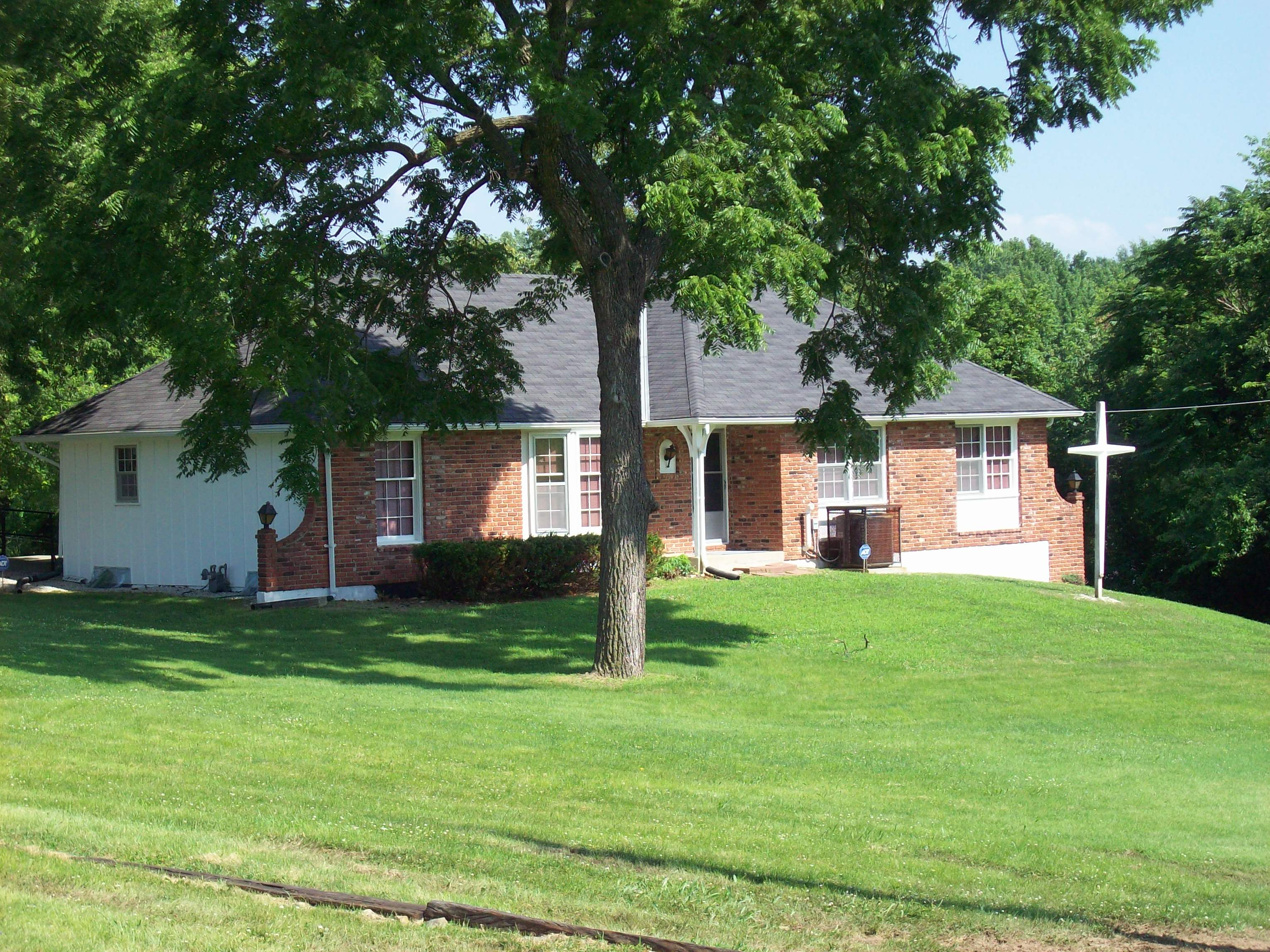
Meetinghouse of the Church of Christ (Restored), in Independence, Missouri

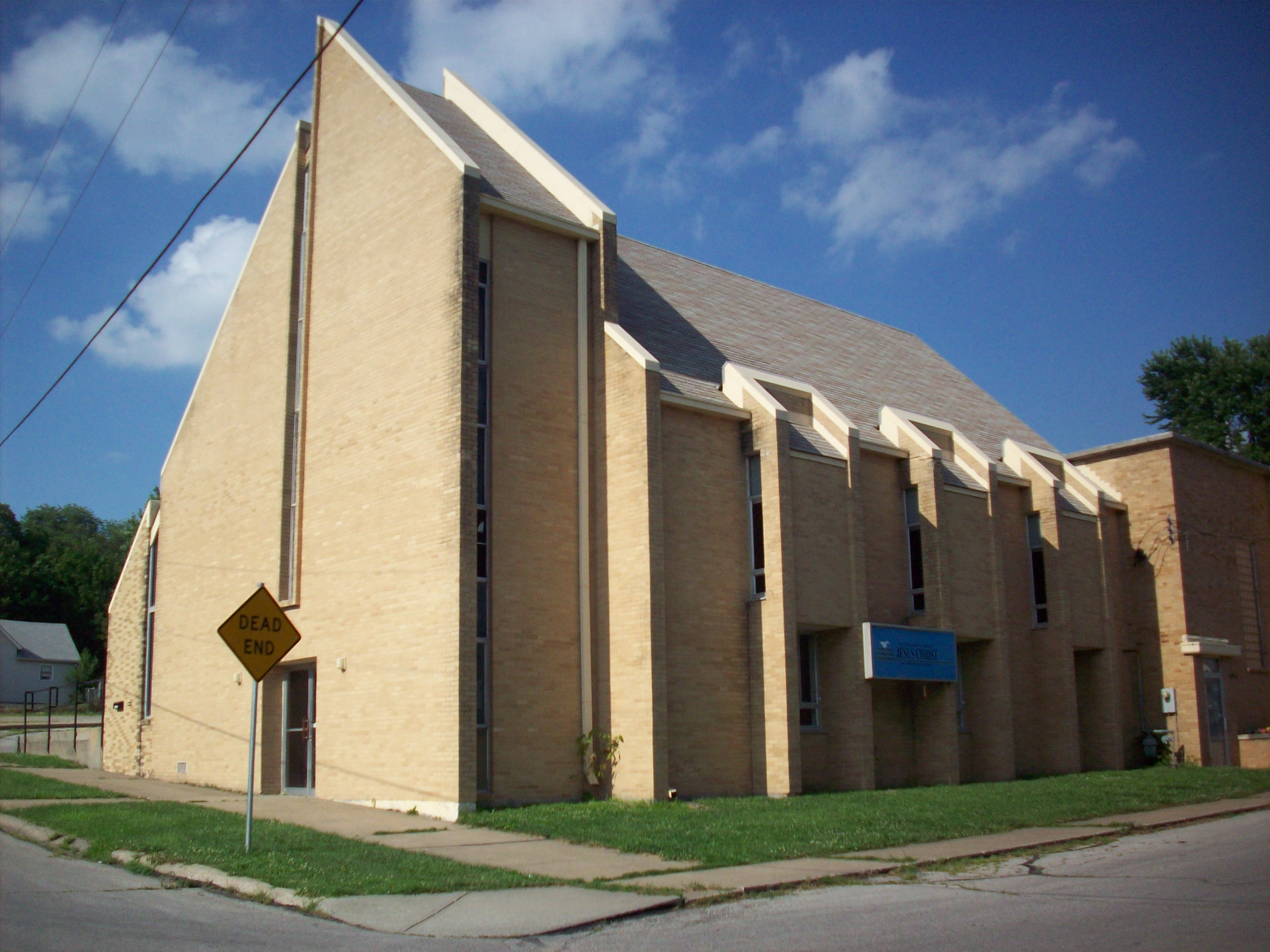
Meetinghouse of the Restoration Church of Jesus Christ of Latter Day Saints, in Independence, Missouri

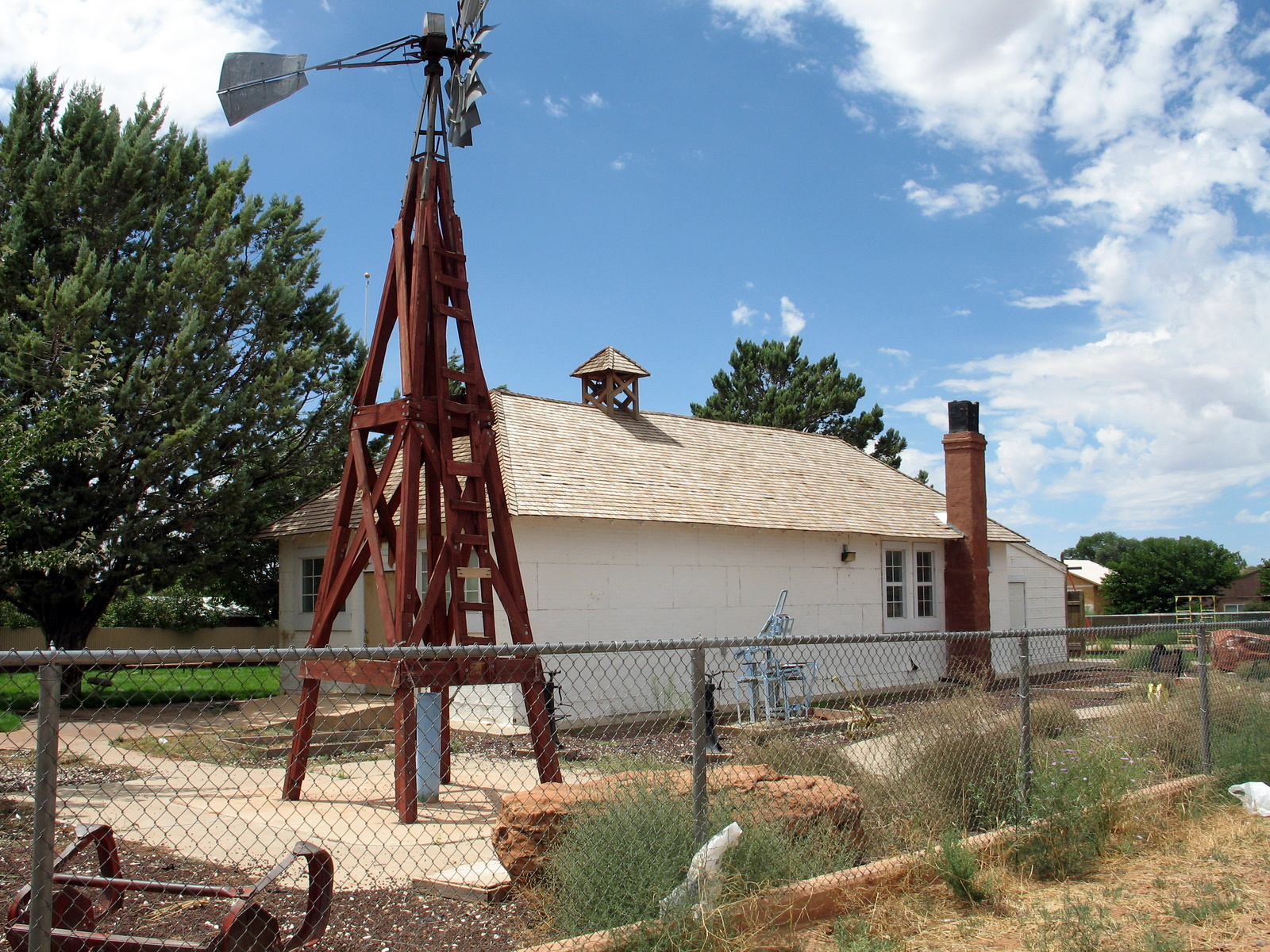
Schoolhouse of the Short Creek Community in Colorado City, Arizona (site of the 1953 Short Creek raid)

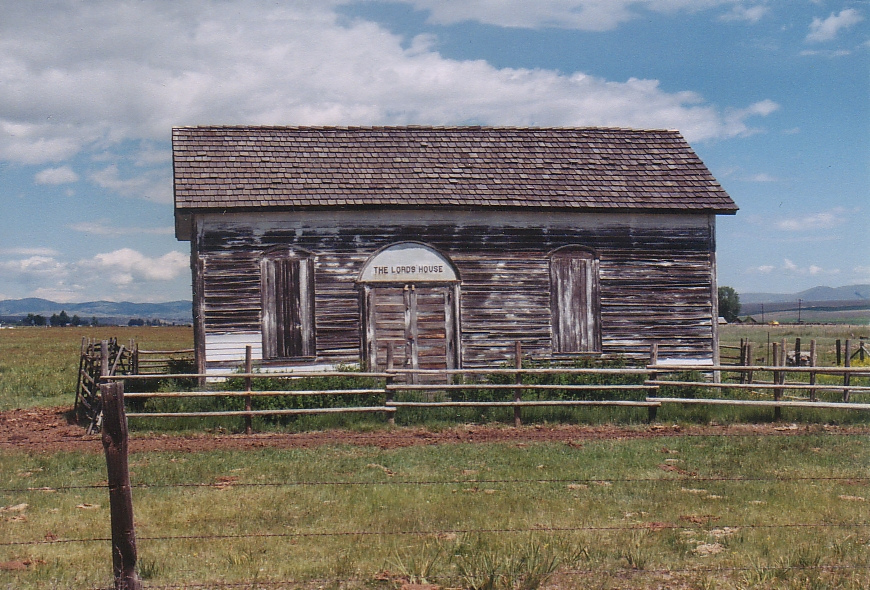
Abandoned meetinghouse of the Church of the Firstborn (Morrisite), in Powell County, Montana

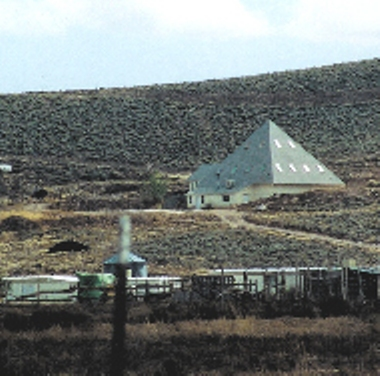
Pyramid-shaped temple and headquarters of the Righteous Branch of the Church of Jesus Christ of Latter-day Saints, located near Modena, Utah

== See also ==
- Mormonism
- Mormons: Groups within Mormonism
- Restoration (Latter Day Saints): Significance and impact
- Restorationism
- Saints in LDS movement
