= Independent church =

Independent church may refer to:

- A self-governed church
- National church, especially in Lutheranism, Anglicanism and Orthodox Christianity, the organisation of that denomination within a given nation, which acts independently of the churches of the same denomination in other nations.
- Free church, as opposed to a state-sanctioned or established church
- Non-denominational church
- Independent (religion), as used in the 17th and 18th centuries
  - a Congregational church, in particular
- Independent Church (Hoton), an 1832 schismatic sect of the Latter Day Saint movement, in Kirtland, Ohio, US

== See also ==
- Autocephaly
