= Pure Church of Christ =

Schismatic organization within the Latter Day Saint movement

The Pure Church of Christ was the first known schismatic organization to emerge within the Latter Day Saint movement (LDS).

The Pure Church of Christ was organized in 1831 in Kirtland, Ohio by Wycam Clark, Northrop Sweet, and four others who claimed that LDS founder Joseph Smith was a false prophet. They had a few meetings and soon disbanded. According to speeches made by George A. Smith that were recorded in the LDS Journal of Discourses, this church never had more than six members.

== History ==
According to George A. Smith, Wyman Clark was baptized into The Church of Jesus Christ of Latter-day Saints about the same time as Sidney Rigdon (mid or late 1830). Clark, another follower of Joseph Smith named Northrop Sweet, and four unnamed others were responsible for the creation of the Pure Church of Christ.

At the time of the creation of the Pure Church of Christ in Kirtland, some latter-day saints founded a communal program inspired by the biblical Book of Acts. About 50 people located on a farm owned by Isaac Morley had been baptized, but had not yet been instructed in relation to their duties under the collectivist arrangement. These people claimed that a spirit entered into them. Some claimed to see angels and other miraculous events were reported.

Upon hearing of these events, Joseph Smith came to Kirtland to teach these Saints that they were in error and how to distinguish between what he described as true and false spiritual manifestations, but Clark rejected Smith's message. Furthermore, Clark claimed he received a revelation that he was to be a prophet and "the true revelator." Clark organized the "Pure Church of Christ" and commenced having meetings and preaching. Although little is known about the group, it has been recounted in the Journal of Discourses that they "said they could carry the whole world with them by preaching 'Mormon' principles."

== See also ==
- History of the Latter Day Saint movement
- List of denominations in the Latter Day Saint movement
