= William W. Davies =

Latter Day Saint pioneer and schismatic (1833–1906)

William Walter Davies
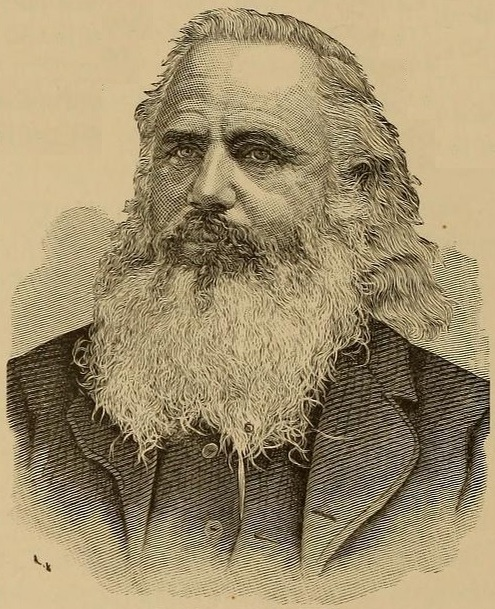

Founder of the 'Kingdom of Heaven'
- 1867 – 1881

Personal details
- Born: 9 August 1833; Eglwysfach county, Denbigh, Wales
- Died: 26 November 1906 (aged 73); Walla Walla County, Washington, United States
- Resting place: Lyons Creek Cemetery; 46.0754°N 118.1579°W

William Walter Davies (9 August 1833 – 25 November 1906) was the leader of a Latter Day Saint schismatic group called the Kingdom of Heaven, which was located near Walla Walla, Washington, from 1867 to 1881.

Davies was born in Eglwysfach county of Denbigh, Wales to a Methodist family. He converted to Mormonism; was baptized on 11 November 1849; emigrated from Wales to the United States in 1854; and emigrated to Utah Territory in July-October 1855 as a Mormon pioneer to join the gathering of the members of The Church of Jesus Christ of Latter-day Saints (LDS Church). In 1857, Davies became disillusioned with the leadership of the LDS Church after the Mountain Meadows Massacre, and he became a follower of the schismatic leader Joseph Morris.

After the 1862 Morrisite War, Davies moved with a number of Morrisites to Deer Lodge County, Montana. While in Montana, Davies claimed to have had a series of revelations which instructed him to establish the "Kingdom of Heaven" on Mill Creek near Walla Walla, Washington. Davies and forty of his followers moved there in 1866 and established a communal society on 80 acres. Davies held legal title to all property of the Kingdom of Heaven.

Davies's main departure from mainstream Mormonism was his teaching of reincarnation. He taught his followers that he was the archangel Michael, who had previously lived lives as the biblical Adam, Abraham, and David. When his son Arthur was born on 11 February 1868, Davies declared that the infant was the reincarnated Jesus Christ; the child came to be called "Walla Walla Jesus". After the announcement, the size of Davies's followers doubled; most of the new converts came from San Francisco, California, and Portland, Oregon. When Davies's second son, David, was born in 1869, he was declared to be God the Father.

The Kingdom of Heaven began to collapse in 1880, when both Davies children died of diphtheria. Some of Davies's followers sued him and won a $3,200 judgment against him. As a result, Davies was forced to sell the Kingdom's property, which essentially brought the Kingdom to a close. At the time of its break-up, there were 43 members of the group. Davies moved to a camp he owned on Mill Creek and briefly attempted to revive his following, but eventually gave up and moved to San Francisco. Davies returned to Walla Walla shortly before his death in 1906, and is buried at the Lyons Cemetery north of Mill Creek Road. The cabin Davies and his family lived in now resides on the grounds of Fort Walla Walla Museum, in Walla Walla, Washington.

== See also ==
- God complex
- List of people claimed to be Jesus
