= Church of Jesus Christ in Zion =

Church in the Latter Day Saint movement

The Church of Jesus Christ in Zion is a small church in the Latter Day Saint movement based on the teachings of "latter day prophet" Kenneth Asay. The church is based on early teachings of the Church of Jesus Christ of Latter-day Saints.

== History ==
The Church of Jesus Christ in Zion was established in 1984. Asay died in 1985, after which the church was taken over by Roger Billings. Billings incorporated the church in Missouri in 1989. As of 2004, the church was based in Independence, Missouri.

== Doctrine ==
According to Church doctrines, there was not to be a formal Church organization but rather individual families were to be the organizational units, presided over by a father or a family patriarch. The Church of Jesus Christ does not consider itself to be a Church organization as is the conventional model of our day. Rather, the Church claims to be a concept or a life plan by which individual families may find encouragement and support in their religious practice.

The Church adopted all of the teachings of the Prophet Joseph Smith, including the teaching that any person who can "bear testimony of Jesus Christ by the power of the Holy Ghost" is a prophet.
