= William C. Conway =

American LDS bishop and sect leader

William C. Conway (May 15, 1865 – 1969) was an American neo-Druid and the leader of a mystical sect in the Latter Day Saint movement.

A native of Redondo Beach, California, Conway was a member of the Church of Jesus Christ of Latter-day Saints (LDS Church) and held the office of high priest in the Melchizedek priesthood and bishop in the Aaronic priesthood.

In the early 1950s, Conway began to claim that he had possession of the Urim and Thummim and the seer stone that Joseph Smith used to translate the Book of Mormon. He generally accepted the teachings of Mormonism, but began to teach that the LDS Church had been incorrect to abandon the practice of plural marriage, which Smith had taught.

In 1955, a Zapotec tribe of the Yucatan Peninsula in Mexico declared Conway to be a prophet and the mouthpiece of Jesus Christ. Conway began claiming that he was the reincarnation of Moroni, a prophet in the Book of Mormon, and that a reincarnated Joseph Smith, "Our Druid Brother", had visited him.

In 1958, Conway published an open letter wherein he set out a number of his beliefs. He taught that menstrual blood was corrupt and that menstruation could be eliminated through righteousness. He also taught that through priesthood alchemy, common metals could be transmutated into gold and that a Book of Mormon prophet named Mulek had blessed Los Angeles to be a holy gathering place. Conway taught that the "One Mighty and Strong" prophesied of in Mormon scripture was a nineteenth-century "young white Indian" from Yucatan named Eachta Eachta Na.

Conway established a church which he called the Perfected Church of Jesus Christ of Immaculate Latter-day Saints, which he sometimes referred to as the Restored Apostolic Church of Jesus Christ of Immaculate Latter-day Saints.

Conway died at the age of 104.

== General references ==
- Carter, Kate B. (1969). Denominations that Base their Beliefs on the Teachings of Joseph Smith, the Mormon Prophet. Salt Lake City, Utah: Daughters of Utah Pioneers.
- Rich, Russell R. (1967). Those Who Would be Leaders: Offshoots of Mormonism (2nd ed.). Provo, Utah: Brigham Young University.
- Shields, Steven L. (1990). Divergent Paths of the Restoration (4th ed.). Independence, MO: Herald House. ISBN 0-942284-13-5.
- Tanner, Jerald and Sandra (1988). The Lucifer–God Doctrine. Salt Lake City, Utah: Utah Lighthouse Ministry.
