= Zion's Order, Inc. =

Latter Day Saints movement sect

Zion's Order
- Classification: Latter Day Saint
- Polity: Hierarchical
- Founder: Marl Kilgore
- Origin: 1951; Bicknell, Utah
- Separated from: Aaronic Order
- Congregations: 1
- Members: 30

Zion's Order, Inc. is a sect in the Latter Day Saint movement that was founded by Marl Kilgore (also known as Merl Kilgore) in 1951.

Kilgore was a member of the Church of Jesus Christ of Latter-day Saints until 1950, when he left the church to join the Aaronic Order. He moved to Bicknell, Utah, where he and another member of the Aaronic Order left that church and formed Zion's Order of the Sons of Levi. In 1953, the church and its followers moved to Mansfield, Missouri.

The new church regarded Kilgore as a prophet, and he recorded over 650 revelations from God. In 1969, Kilgore resigned as the president of the church to focus on performing missionary work among Native Americans in the southwestern United States. In 1975, Zion's Order of the Sons of Levi incorporated and became known simply as Zion's Order, Inc.

The church teaches that the Latter Day Saints must return to the practices of the United Order in preparation for the Second Coming of Jesus. The church uses the same scriptures that are used by the LDS Church, with the exception of section 132 of the Doctrine and Covenants, which sets out the doctrines of plural marriage and celestial marriage.

The church is composed of one congregation of approximately 30 people and are governed by a First Presidency, a presiding bishop, and a presiding patriarch.

In the early 1950s, Theron Drew, a member of the Church of Jesus Christ of Latter Day Saints (Strangite), identified Kilgore as the "One Mighty and Strong" that was prophesied by Joseph Smith to come forward to put the church in order. Drew's enthusiasm for Kilgore and his church were short-lived, however, and Drew went on to found the Church of Jesus Christ (Drewite).

== In literature ==
- "Notes from Out of the Shadows" Garnet June author, name used in book is Spring Haven(eldest daughter of Marl Kilgore, Leader of Zion's Order of the Son's of Levi, Inc, Zion's Order, Inc Mansfield, Missouri
- In "Walking the Trail", a 1991 book by Jerry Ellis the author describes his visit to the Zion's Order compound in Missouri.
