= Independent Church (Hoton) =

Schismatic group in the Church of Christ (Latter Day Saints)

The Independent Church was organized in 1832 in Kirtland, Ohio as a schism in the Church of Christ (Latter Day Saints). Little is known about this second schismatic sect of the Latter Day Saint movement apart from the date of establishment, the surname of its founder, and that Hoton denounced Joseph Smith Jr. and the Book of Mormon. Hoton's movement self-destructed when he and his bishop had disagreements.

== See also ==
- History of the Latter Day Saint movement
- List of sects in the Latter Day Saint movement
