= James Brighouse =

19th century leader of a Latter Day Saint sect

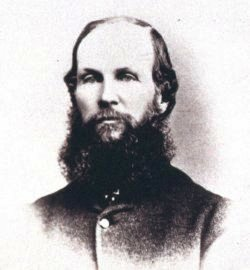
Possibly a photo of Brighouse, ca 1890

James Brighouse (14 September 1841 in Loughborough, Leicestershire, England – 17 July 1916 in South Cottonwood, Utah, United States) was a late-nineteenth-century American leader of a splinter sect in the Latter Day Saint movement called the Order of Enoch. Brighouse was one of the first people to claim to be the "One Mighty and Strong" that Joseph Smith had prophesied of in 1832.

== Order of Enoch ==
On December 7, 1884, a few members of the Reorganized Church of Jesus Christ of Latter Day Saints met in Independence, Missouri to organize what they called the Order of Enoch or the Church or Kingdom of Christ. The leaders of group were Brighouse and Lars Peterson.

Brighouse and Peterson published The Voice at Midnight on December 25, 1884, in Independence, Missouri. This 4-page tract called for a return to the law of consecration. A form titled "Deed or Covenant" is part of the tract. This form provided for the consecration of property to the Bishop. The tract also called for the followers of Christ to devote themselves to Christ's teachings and become sanctified and pure in heart.

== Teachings ==
Brighouse taught that Brigham Young had led the majority of Latter Day Saints astray by teaching plural marriage. Brighouse claimed that he was the "One Mighty and Strong" that Joseph Smith had prophesied would come to "set in order the house of God".

In 1891, Brighouse traveled to Salt Lake City, Utah Territory. It was believed by some Latter Day Saints that Joseph Smith had prophesied that Jesus Christ would return to earth by 1891; Brighouse went to the incomplete Salt Lake Temple and declared that he was Jesus, whose coming had been prophesied. Brighouse preached in Salt Lake City for a few days and converted a handful of followers. One of those followers, Dr. Henry I. Doremus, a prominent educator in Utah, assisted with Brighouse's publications. Doremus was excommunicated by the Church, for non-conformity to the tenets of that sect, particularly for his refusal to recognize the leaders of the church as the inspired agents and representatives of the Divinity.

In Utah Territory in 1892, Brighouse published a book called The Voice of the Seventh Angel, Proclaiming the End of Time! The Resurrection of the Dead! The Day of Final Judgment! and the Rule of Righteousness and Peace!. The following are some of the primary teachings in the book:

- The Latter-day Saints have only the priesthood of Aaron, and no longer have the higher priesthood, known as the Melchizedek priesthood.
- After the death of Joseph Smith, the Twelve Apostles had no right to create a higher quorum or president of the Church. Brigham Young was chosen to lead them to Utah, but he has taught false doctrines and led the Saints astray. He sinned in appointing himself the President of the Church in 1847, without a Revelation from the Lord.
- Regarding resurrection and reincarnation, Brighouse taught that eternal life is the possession of power to always live, or to be changed in the twinkling of an eye, or to immediately enter another tabernacle.
- The interior of the earth is inhabited with its teeming millions of human life and other creatures and it is where Jesus went to preach to the spirits in prison. It is in the earth, in darkness. It is the bottomless pit, spoken of in the Book of Revelation. It is the open space through the center of the earth, an atmosphere or space hundreds of miles across.
- America is the land the sheep of the Lord should flock to. It is their land. It was once the location of the Garden of Eden where Adam lived. Zion should be established in that same area in the center of the Western Continent (near Independence, Missouri).
- Heaven is on the earth; and not far away, as the blind guides teach and preach; it is not beyond the sky or on some other planet; but it is immediately where we dwell; the very globe upon which we find ourselves today has all the conditions and elements of our eternal heaven or hell, and so hath every other earth throughout boundless space.
- Every government on earth is bound, controlled, or influenced by a secret combination (secret organizations); paralyzing the very lifestrings of freedom and liberty; working behind the scenes in secret conclaves, and beyond the reach of the laws of any nation or kingdom on earth.
- Zion must be built on the correct principles of government which is the preservation of agency, freedom, and righteousness. Also by love and not unrighteous authority.
- A man can become a god by obtaining a fullness of light, love, and truth, in union with the eternal principles that govern heaven and earth.

Little is known of Brighouse's life after 1892, but his following remained small.
