= Holy Church of Jesus Christ =

- Classification: Latter Day Saint
- Polity: Hierarchical
- Founder: Alexandre Caffiaux
- Origin: 1964
- Separated from: Church of Jesus Christ of Latter Day Saints (Strangite)

Holy Church of Jesus Christ was a schismatic sect in the Latter Day Saint movement that formed under the leadership of Alexandre Caffiaux, a French member of the Church of Jesus Christ of Latter Day Saints (Strangite).

In 1963, Caffiaux travelled from France to Wisconsin to become a member of the Strangite church. In Wisconsin, he was baptized and was ordained to the priesthood. On his return flight to France, Caffiaux reported receiving a revelation from God that he was the rightful successor to Joseph Smith, Jr. and James J. Strang and that he should become the head of the church.

In 1964, while visiting Iran, Caffiaux reported being visited by an angel in a vision and being ordained a prophet, seer, and revelator and the embodiment of the First Presidency of the Melchizedek priesthood. Other Strangite adherents in France supported Caffiaux in his claims.

Although Caffiaux called for a general church conference to consider his claims, none was called. At a conference of the Strangite church in France, the Strangite adherents voted to rename their congregation "Église sainte de Jésus Christ" — the "Holy Church of Jesus Christ". In 1978, the Strangite church formally rejected Caffiaux's claims.

In 1966, the Holy Church of Jesus Christ had congregations in France and in New Mexico in the United States. The organization is now defunct.
