= Irene Spencer =

American author (1937–2017)

- Born: Irene Kunz; February 1, 1937; Salt Lake City, Utah
- Died: March 12, 2017; Mexico
- Occupation: Author
- Spouse(s): Verlan LeBaron (July 3, 1953 until his death in 1981); Lane Stubbs (1981-1984); Hector J. Spencer
- Relatives: Former sister in-law : Susan Ray Schmidt
- Website: www.irenespencerbooks.com

Irene Spencer (née Kunz; February 1, 1937 – March 12, 2017) was an American author and a widow of Verlan LeBaron, brother of former prophet Joel LeBaron of the Church of the Firstborn of the Fulness of Times, a fundamentalist Mormon offshoot.

== Early life ==
Irene Golda Kunz was born in Salt Lake City, Utah on February 1, 1937, one of 31 children born to polygamist Morris Kunz. She was the fifth generation of her family to live in polygamy. Her ancestors were members of the LDS Church who believed that they could not attain the highest rewards of heaven unless they were in plural marriages. When the LDS Church banned the practice of polygamy, her family refused to abandon their beliefs and became fundamentalist Mormons.

Utah periodically targeted polygamists for breaking the law against plural marriages, and in 1944, Morris Kunz was jailed for practicing polygamy. When he finished his two-year prison sentence, he returned to the polygamous lifestyle. The Kunz family were related to members of most of the major fundamentalist groups. Spencer's uncle, Rulon Allred, became a leader of the Apostolic United Brethren. As a child, Spencer would visit family in the FLDS communities, and was courted by a younger brother of Merrill Jessop, who became a leader in the FLDS church. In 1953, at only 16, Spencer became the second wife of Verlan LeBaron. His first wife was her older half-sister Charlotte. LeBaron was the youngest son of Alma Dayer LeBaron, who had organized a polygamous community, Colonia LeBaron, in the foothills of the Sierra Nevada in Mexico after being excommunicated by the mainstream LDS Church for practicing polygamy. When Alma LeBaron died in 1951, he passed leadership of the polygamist community down to his son Joel, who formally organized the Church of the Firstborn in the Fullness of Times with himself as head prophet.

== Married life ==
Following her marriage to Verlan, Spencer relocated to Colonia LeBaron. Verlan became a leader within the church, becoming the President of the Twelve Apostles. Around 1960, he moved his family to Ensenada. When the church started a second colony, Los Molinos, on the Baja California peninsula, Verlan moved Spencer and another wife, Ester, into tents on the property. After Verlan built a home, he moved his sixth wife, Susan Ray Schmidt, to Los Molinos to join Spencer and her children.

Verlan worked in Las Vegas, Nevada during the week to earn money to build homes for his wives. He came to Mexico to visit his wives every few weeks, but spent more time in Ensenada than he did with Spencer and Ester in Los Molinos. Spencer was often lonely or jealous.

Spencer and Verlan's other wives had very little money, most of it provided by Charlotte, Spencer's sister and Verlan's first wife, who worked as a preschool teacher in San Diego while her children were raised by another wife, Lucy. Spencer was forced to become very creative to make ends meet.

Over 28 years of marriage, Spencer bore Verlan 13 children, and adopted another child.

A power struggle ensued between the sons of Alma Dayer LeBaron. A younger son, Ervil, founded his own church, the Church of the Lamb of God, in 1972 in San Diego, California, and later that year ordered the murder of his brother Joel, claiming justification based on the doctrine of blood atonement. Ervil's hit list would eventually reach the hundreds and include John F. Kennedy and the President of the Church of Jesus Christ of Latter Day Saints. Besides Joel, he would succeed in murdering his pregnant daughter Rebecca and Rulon C. Allred, the President of the Apostolic United Brethren, another key polygamist group. Rulon Allred was Irene's mother's brother, and one of the reasons Ervil had him killed was so he could kill Verlan at Rulon's funeral.

After Joel's death, Verlan was tapped for leadership of the Church of the Firstborn, so Ervil added Irene's family to his hit list. To escape the death threats, Irene and her children were forced to move to Nicaragua, where they lived in huts without electricity or indoor plumbing, battled ticks and jungle insects, and were infected by intestinal worms.

The living conditions in Nicaragua nearly broke Irene, but she finally left Verlan in 1978 when, despite the family's abject poverty, he married a 10th wife, Priscilla. After seeking spiritual advice outside of the polygamist community, she was convinced to return to Verlan in 1980. One year later, on August 16, 1981, Verlan died in an automobile accident. His brother Ervil, had died 2 days prior in the Utah State Penitentiary, where he was serving a life sentence for the murder of Rulon Allred.

== Later years ==
After Verlan's death in 1981, according to church historian Thomas J. Liddiard, Spencer did not leave polygamy: she became a plural wife of Lane Stubbs. In 1986, this marriage had ended as well. She then entered a monogamous marriage around 1988 to Hector J. Spencer, who had been an apostle in the Quorum of Twelve Apostles in the LeBaron Church of the Firstborn. Spencer became a born-again Christian at the urging of one of her sons and became an outspoken critic of polygamy. She wrote several books, including Shattered Dreams: My Life as a Polygamist's Wife and Cult Insanity: A Memoir of Polygamy, Prophets, and Blood Atonement to shed light on the realities of polygamy in modern America.

Hector Spencer died on January 21, 2013, at their home in Mexico, where he was buried.

== Sources ==
- Schmidt, Susan Ray (2009), Favorite Wife: Escape from Polygamy, Guilford, CT: The Lyons Press, ISBN 978-1-59921-494-8
