= Le Baron =

Le Baron, le Baron, or LeBaron may refer to:

- Chrysler LeBaron, a car model produced by Chrysler
- Church of the Firstborn (LeBaron order), principal enclave of the LeBaron Mormon fundamentalist group, in Galeana, Chihuahua
- LeBarón family massacre
- LeBaron Incorporated, a car design and body builder established in 1920
- The Phantom Baron (Le baron fantôme), French drama film
- Imperial Le Baron, a model of Imperial
- A lieu-dit in Ledringhem, Nord, France

== People ==
=== Surname ===
- Alma Dayer LeBaron Sr. (1886–1951), founder of precursor to Church of the Firstborn
- Anne LeBaron (born 1953), American composer and harpist
- Benjamin LeBarón (1976–2009), anti-crime activist Galeana, Chihuahua, Mexico
- Eddie LeBaron (1930–2015), professional American NFL football player
- Emily LeBaron (1906–1983), an artist, antique dealer, art teacher and community organizer from North Hatley, Quebec, Canada
- Ervil LeBaron (1925–1981), leader of a fundamentalist Mormon polygamous cult
- Gaye LeBaron, American journalist
- Heber LeBaron, cult leader, Church of the First Born of the Lamb of God, and convicted murderer
- Joel LeBaron (1923–1972), Mormon fundamentalist leader in northern Mexico
- Joseph LeBaron (born 1947), American ambassador
- Louis LeBaron (1898–1989), Justice of the Territorial Supreme Court of Hawaii
- Louise Le Baron (1874–1918), American contralto singer
- Percy LeBaron Spencer (1894–1970) is an American inventor known for inventing the microwave oven
- Richard LeBaron, United States Ambassador to Kuwait (2004–2007)
- Vincent Le Baron (born 1989), French footballer
- William LeBaron (entomologist) (1814–1876), American entomologist
- William LeBaron, (1883–1958) American film producer
- William Le Baron Jenney (1832–1907), American architect and engineer
- William LeBaron Putnam (1835–1918), American jurist

=== Given name ===
- LeBaron Russell Briggs (1855–1934), American educator
- LeBaron B. Colt (1846–1924), American politician and judge
- LeBaron Hollimon (born 1969), American soccer coach
- LeBaron Hart Lindauer (1878–1945), American groundskeeper
- LeBaron Bradford Prince (1840–1922), American lawyer and politician

== See also ==
- The Brainiac (El Baron del Terror), a 1962 Mexican film
- Baron (disambiguation)
