= Heber LeBaron =

Mormon fundamentalist cult leader

William Heber LeBaron is a convicted murderer who once led the cult Church of the Lamb of God.

== Early years ==
William Heber LeBaron was one of 54 children sired by Ervil LeBaron, a member of a polygamous Mormon fundamentalist group. The LeBarons were descendants of Benjamin F. Johnson, one of the earliest followers of Latter Day Saint movement founder Joseph Smith. When the Church of Jesus Christ of Latter-day Saints renounced polygamy, Johnson and his family became Mormon fundamentalists and continued the practice.

Johnson's grandson, Alma Dayer LeBaron Sr., believed that Johnson was the rightful successor to Smith, and that Johnson had appointed Alma to follow him. Alma LeBaron moved his family to Mexico, where the government showed no interest in prosecuting polygamists. After Alma's death, his son Joel founded The Church of the Firstborn of the Fulness of Times and named himself the One Mighty and Strong. Ervil LeBaron served as his brother's second-in-command for several years, but in 1967 began preaching that he, and not Joel, was the true leader of the church.

By 1972, Ervil founded his own sect, the Church of the First Born of the Lamb of God. He preached the importance of blood atonement, a long-renounced Mormon principle that required that the blood of sinners be shed to ensure that they have a place in Heaven. Ervil LeBaron also claimed that he was the true leader of all polygamous Mormon sects, and that they should all tithe to support him and his church. Those who refused were threatened with violence. Ervil died in jail in 1981, after being convicted of plotting the murder of Rulon C. Allred, leader of one of the largest polygamous sects. While incarcerated, Ervil crafted a list of people who deserved blood atonement, consisting of people who had left his church or otherwise upset him. Ervil's manifesto also included a list of men who would succeed him as leader of the cult. His son Heber was listed second, after Ervil's eldest son Arturo.

== Cult leader ==
Heber LeBaron was 20 years old when he assumed leadership of the cult after his elder half-brother's death. Under his leadership, the cult fully embraced criminal enterprises. He was convicted in Arizona of operating a large auto theft ring. He was also charged with attempted murder of a guard during a bank robbery in Texas.

LeBaron committed to enforcing his father's wish to blood atone perceived traitors. After his younger half-brother Richard agreed to testify against him, LeBaron was convicted of killing former cult member Mark Chynoweth in one of what was known as the 4 O'Clock murders. Chynoweth's brother Duane, Duane's 8-year-old daughter Jennifer, and LeBaron's half-brother Ed Marston were also killed at approximately the same time, 4 pm on June 27, 1988.

== Post-conviction ==
LeBaron claims to have converted to evangelical Protestantism and to be ashamed of his actions while with the cult.

== Sources ==
Anderson, Scott (1992), The 4 O'Clock Murders: The True Story of a Mormon Family's Veneance, Doubleday, ISBN 9780385419048
