= Lebron (disambiguation) =

LeBron James (born 1984) is an American professional basketball player.

Lebron or LeBron may also refer to:

- Betty LeBron, lead singer of the freestyle group Sweet Sensation
- Bronny James (LeBron James Jr.) (born 2004), American basketball player and son of LeBron James Sr.
- Lebrón, Spanish surname
- LeBron Bond (born 2007), American college football player
- Lebron Shields (born 1937), American football player
- Justin Lebron (born 2004), American baseball player
- The LeBrons, a mock family based on the basketball player
- LeBron James of Soccer, nickname of Christian Pulisic

== See also ==
- Leebron, surname
- Lebrun, given name and surname
- Le Baron (disambiguation), includes list of people with name Le Baron
