= 4 O'Clock murders =

1988 coordinated murders

- Location: Houston, Texas, Irving, Texas
- Date: June 27, 1988; 38 years ago 4:00 PM (Central Time Zone)
- Attack type: Murder by shooting
- Weapon: Guns
- Deaths: 4
- Victims: Mark Chynoweth (38), Duane Chynoweth, Jennifer Chynoweth (8), and Eddie Marston
- Perpetrator: Aaron LeBaron
- Assailants: William Heber LeBaron, Douglas Lee Barlow, and Patricia LeBaron
- Motive: Following commands of religious leader to punish specific apostates.

The 4 O'Clock murders were the coordinated shootings of four people at the same time on June 27, 1988, at three locations in Texas led by Mormon fundamentalist leader Heber LeBaron of the Church of the Firstborn. Heber was the successor as church leader to Ervil LeBaron (nicknamed the "Mormon Manson" after Charles Manson) of the similarly named Church of the First Born of the Lamb of God. Ervil had previously orchestrated the murder of several others he perceived as apostates. Authorities say the religious organizations were responsible for over 20 deaths over several decades.

Aaron LeBaron was sentenced to forty-five years in prison as the orchestrator of the murders. The assailants Heber LeBaron and Patricia LeBaron were given life in prison, while Douglas Lee Barlow served a five year sentence due to reaching a plea deal.

== Depictions ==
The murders were depicted in the 2024 Hulu documentary Daughters of the Cult, and the 1992 book The 4 O'Clock Murders: The True Story of a Mormon Family's Vengeance.

== See also ==
- Blood atonement
- Christian terrorism
- Cult
- Honor killing
- Mass shooting
- Mormonism and polygamy
- Mormonism and violence
