= Church of the Firstborn =

Church of the Firstborn or Church of the First Born may refer to:

== "Morrisite" Latter Day Saint sect ==
- Church of the Firstborn (Morrisite), a Latter Day Saint sect formed in 1861 and extant until 1969

== LeBaron Mormon fundamentalist group factions ==
- Church of the Firstborn (LeBaron family)
  - Church of the Firstborn of the Fulness of Times, a Latter Day Saint sect formed in the 1950s by Joel LeBaron
  - Church of the First Born of the Lamb of God, founded in 1972 by Ervil LeBaron

== Dalton Mormon fundamentalist group ==
- Church of the First Born and General Assembly of Heaven, a Latter Day Saint sect formed by Terrill Dalton in 2004

== See also ==
- General Assembly and Church of the First Born
