= Daniel Ben Jordan =

American Mormon fundamentalist

Daniel Ben Jordan (May 20, 1934 – October 16, 1987) was an American Mormon fundamentalist. He was a follower of Joel LeBaron, until his brother Ervil LeBaron formed the splinter group The Church of the Lamb of God.

== Murder of Joel LeBaron ==
In 1972, Ervil LeBaron orchestrated the murder of his brother Joel, the first victim of the fundamentalist blood atonement policy. Jordan was arrested for the murder, but he was released because witnesses were too afraid to testify against him. The murder, and Jordan's alleged involvement, is portrayed in the 2024 Hulu Documentary Daughters of the Cult.

== Death ==
Daniel Ben Jordan was shot multiple times and killed on October 16, 1987, while on a deer-hunting trip with at least two of his wives and other family members in the Beaver Creek area of Twelve-mile Canyon near Manti, Utah. Sanpete County Sheriff Chuck Ramsey stated, "Certain members of Ervil LeBaron's family are considered to be prime suspects in the apparent execution of Dan Jordan." Shortly after Jordan's funeral in Colorado, Ervil LeBaron's son Aaron was arrested for menacing Jordan's family. According to reports, he allegedly brandished weapons and claimed to have received divine revelations granting him life-and-death authority over the family. The charges were later dropped.
