= Rena Chynoweth =

American murderer (born 1958)

- Born: 1958 (age 67–68); Ogden, Utah, U.S.

Details
- Victims: Rulon C. Allred, 71
- Date: May 10, 1977
- Country: United States
- Location: Murray, Utah

Rena Chynoweth (born 1958) is an American former Mormon fundamentalist who shot and killed Rulon C. Allred in 1977. Acquitted of murder in a criminal trial, Chynoweth later admitted to killing Allred.

== Early life ==
When she was three years old, Rena Chynoweth's parents were converted to the Mormon fundamentalist Church of the Firstborn of the Fulness of Times, based in Colonia LeBaron in northern Mexico. The Chynoweths moved to Colonia LeBaron to join the rest of the polygamist sect, which was at the time led by Joel LeBaron. Joel's leadership was soon challenged by his younger brother, Ervil, who believed that he was the "One Mighty and Strong" chosen by God to lead the Latter-day Saints. The Chynoweths followed Ervil when he eventually broke away from Joel's church. The Chynoweths, especially young Rena, were devout followers of Ervil. Ervil proposed to Rena when she was only 16. In a proxy interview with Doris Hanson in 2009, Rena claimed that Ervil told her she would go to hell if she did not accept the proposal. As she believed Ervil to be a true prophet she did not doubt this, so she accepted the proposal. She became his thirteenth wife and had two children by him.

== Allred's death and trial ==
Ervil soon organized his followers into a new church, the Church of the Lamb of God. Its members were known as the 'Lambs of God'. Ervil used the doctrine of blood atonement to justify the murders of other polygamist leaders whom he believed were enemies of his church, and therefore, enemies of God. One of his prime targets was Doctor Rulon Clark Allred, leader of the Apostolic United Brethren. As one of Ervil's most devout and "prettiest" followers the nineteen-year-old Chynoweth, along with Ramona Marston, were chosen to carry out the murder of Allred.

In May 1977 Chynoweth and Marston travelled from Mexico to Murray, Utah, where Allred's office was, stopping to buy weapons and disguises en route. They reached Murray on May 10 and entered Allred's office disguised in wigs and sunglasses. Chynoweth shot him seven times, fatally wounding him, before the pair fled. They hid out in Mexico but were soon apprehended and brought back to Utah.

Chynoweth was tried for the murder of Allred in March 1979 in a Utah court. After two weeks of testimony, the jury acquitted her of murder. Dorothy Allred Solomon, daughter of victim Rulon Allred, gives a number of reasons for Chynoweth's acquittal. These include her convincing lies during the trial, sympathy for her pregnancy and the fact that she could not be identified by witnesses as she was disguised when the shooting took place. Solomon also accuses the "Lambs of God" of intimidating the jury at the trial, and suggests that in patriarchal Utah, "a society harbouring sexual discrimination would try to compensate in a court of law".

== Leaving polygamy and civil trial ==
With her husband imprisoned, Chynoweth began to change her mind about polygamy and left the Church of the Lamb of God. In 1990, knowing that it was highly unlikely that she would be tried again, she published a "breezy, tell all memoir" about her life with Ervil LeBaron, in which she admitted to shooting Rulon Allred. While being interviewed on Sally, Chynoweth was served with a summons to answer civil claims of causing the unlawful death of Rulon C. Allred. The claims were filed by the Allred family, who still sought justice for Rulon's death. The trial took place in February 1992. Chynoweth did not appear at the trial, as she claimed that the Lambs of God were still after her for leaving the church. Chynoweth was found liable for the wrongful death of Rulon Allred and ordered to pay $52 million in damages to the Allred family. The Allreds never collected the money. Fred Goldman later cited this case as a precedent for not collecting any money from his son's death when O. J. Simpson was found liable for the wrongful death of Ron Goldman.

Chynoweth later remarried. She claims to have been controlled by Ervil LeBaron through fear. She now works to help children who have suffered from involvement in polygamy. She strongly supported the actions of Texas during the YFZ Ranch raid.
