= Lebrón =

Lebrón is a Spanish surname. Notable people with the name include:

- Antonio de Padua María Severino López de Santa Anna y Pérez de Lebrón (1794–1876) a.k.a. "Santa Anna", Mexican political leader, general and president
- Benjamín Cintrón Lebrón, Puerto Rican politician
- Jools Lebron, American TikToker
- Juan Manuel Lebrón (born 1947), Puerto Rican actor, model, scriptwriter, television producer
- Lolita Lebrón (1919–2010), Puerto Rican activist and revolutionary
- Luisa Lebrón (born 1949), Puerto Rican judge and politician
- Mariano Lebrón Saviñón (1922–2014), Dominican writer
- Mariasela Álvarez Lebrón, Miss World 1982 and Miss Dominican Republic 1982
- Maybell Lebron (born 1923), Argentine-Paraguayan writer
- Michael A. Lebron, petitioner in the Supreme Court case Lebron v. National Railroad Passenger Corp.
- Michael William Lebron a.k.a. "Lionel" (born 1958), American radio and television personality
- Mike Lebrón a.k.a. "Spanish Mike" (born 1934), Puerto Rican pool player
- Sergio Calatayud Lebrón (born 1990), Spanish footballer
- Lebrón Brothers, Puerto Rican musicians

== See also ==
- Lebron (disambiguation)
- Leebron, surname
- Lebrun, given name and surname
- Le Baron (disambiguation), includes list of people with name Le Baron
