= Church of the First Born of the Lamb of God =

Violent Latter Day Saint fringe group

The Church of the First Born of the Lamb of God (commonly shortened to Church of the Lamb of God) was a violent Latter Day Saint fringe group founded by Ervil LeBaron in the late 1960s. After LeBaron’s death in 1981, his cult splintered into multiple factions, which were run by Daniel Ben Jordan and several of LeBaron’s teenage sons. There ensued a bloody battle as the factions vied for power, each claiming to be led by LeBaron’s true successor. The group was responsible for dozens of deaths over two decades.

== Background ==
When Joseph Smith founded the Latter Day Saint movement, Benjamin F. Johnson was one of his earliest followers. Johnson followed the church's original teachings and practiced polygamy, taking multiple wives. When the Church of Jesus Christ of Latter-day Saints renounced polygamy, Johnson and his family, like many Mormon fundamentalists, continued the practice. In 1924, Johnson's grandson, Alma Dayer LeBaron, Sr. moved his family to Mexico, where the government showed no interest in prosecuting polygamists, settling near Colonia Juárez, Chihuahua.

Alma believed that Johnson was the rightful successor to Smith, and that Johnson had appointed Alma to follow him. After Alma's death in 1951, several of his sons claimed to be his true successor. In 1955, his son Joel founded The Church of the Firstborn of the Fulness of Times and named himself as president. His brother Ervil became second-in-command, with full authority over their new settlement, known as Colonia LeBaron. A third brother, Verlan, also held a high position in the church.

By 1967, tensions were rising between Joel and Ervil. Joel rejected Ervil's advocacy for the return of the former Mormon principle of blood atonement, which required that a sinner must have their blood shed in order for them to earn a place in heaven, effectively requiring a death penalty. The brothers also argued about the fate of their second Mexican colony, a ranch known as Los Molinos, in Baja California; Joel intended the land to support future church recruits, while Ervil wanted to develop the land as a resort.

== Foundation and fratricide ==
By the late 1960s, Ervil began preaching against Joel, accusing his brother of crimes against their faith. Proclaiming that he was the true successor to his father, Ervil began the Church of the Lamb of God and named himself as president. Some of Joel's followers, including Daniel Ben Jordan and the Chynoweth and Rios families, switched their allegiance to Ervil. In 1972, Ervil orchestrated the murder of Joel — the first victim of the blood atonement policy. Jordan, one of the two assassins, was later arrested for the murder but was released when fearful witnesses refused to testify against him. The other killer, Gamaliel Rios, remained free.

To Ervil's surprise, Joel's followers did not flock to his side; instead they advocated for Ervil's arrest. He was convicted of planning the murder, but freed a year later by a Mexican appellate court. During his imprisonment, Ervil continued to release pamphlets and books insisting that he was the Mormon One Mighty and Strong and that, as God's representative on earth, he could decide who should die for their sins.

Ervil began to focus executing his brother Verlan, who Joel's followers had elected as their new leader. Fearing for his life, Verlan went into hiding. On December 26, 1974, in an effort to flush him out, Ervil's underage thirteenth wife Rena Chynoweth and her brothers Mark and Duane (Note: Ervil LeBaron was also married to another Chynoweth sibling, Lorna.) raided Los Molinos. The party threw firebombs at houses and shot at residents, killing two young men and injuring thirteen. They failed in their primary goal; Verlan had just moved his families out of his church's colony to Nicaragua. Ervil was arrested for masterminding the raid, but was released due to lack of evidence.

Increasingly upset by the violence, Noemi Zarate, a wife of Bud Chynoweth (father of two of Ervil's wives), threatened to leave Ervil's church and go to the police. On Ervil's orders, his tenth wife Vonda White drove Zarate into the desert and killed her. Her body has never been found.

== 1975-1980 ==
Following his release from prison, Ervil moved part of his family to San Diego, California. Ervil wrote letters to and visited many polygamist leaders, threatening their lives if they did not switch their allegiance to his church and tithe accordingly. Robert Simons, a leader of a small polygamous sect in Utah, denounced Ervil after learning that he wanted to marry one of Simons' wives. Simons was murdered in April 1975 by Mark Chynoweth and Eddie Marston, on Ervil's orders.

That same year, another of Ervil's followers, Dean Vest, prepared to leave the church. Ervil was already angry with Vest for refusing to sell a houseboat that he owned and tithe half of the proceeds. On Ervil's orders, White executed Dean in her kitchen, for which she was later convicted. Ervil told White that with this murder she had ensured her presence in heaven.

In 1977, Ervil ordered the death of his pregnant teenage daughter Rebecca, the wife of Mark Chynoweth. Angry that she had been separated from her infant son, Rebecca threatened to go to police about the group's activities. A witness later testified that Rebecca's body was stuffed into the trunk of a car and that Ervil drove it around town for the afternoon. When Rebecca's mother, Ervil's first wife Delfina, discovered that her daughter had been murdered on the orders of her husband, she strongly objected. Another of her daughters, Lillian (who was also married to Mark) warned her that if she did not accept the righteousness of Rebecca's death, she would also be marked for blood atonement. Believing her son-in-law and daughter were preparing to murder her, Delfina and her youngest daughter snuck out of Lillian's house and fled to Mexico.

Still seeking to kill his brother Verlan, Ervil hatched a plan to flush him out of hiding. He convinced Rena Chynoweth, now aged 18, and his stepdaughter Ramona Marston, Jordan's wife, to kill Rulon C. Allred, the leader of the Apostolic United Brethren, one of the largest polygamist sects. Three of Ervil's other followers, including Ramon's brother Ed, attended Allred's funeral with orders to kill Verlan and anyone else who got in their way. They aborted their mission when they realized that police were stationed all around the funeral area to protect the mourners.

Ervil was captured in Mexico and tried and convicted in the United States for planning Allred's murder. It was the first time he had been charged with a crime in the U.S. Rena Chynoweth and Ramona Marston were acquitted by a jury for their role in the murder.

While he was incarcerated in Utah, Ervil continued to write testaments for his followers. One of these, the Book of New Covenants, contained a list of fifty people that Ervil marked for blood atonement. The book also contained a list of who should succeed Ervil as leader of the Church of the Lamb of God. Ervil died in jail in August 15, 1981. His brother Verlan died in a car crash in Mexico several days later.

== Arturo LeBaron ==
Ervil's book had named his eldest son, Arturo, as his immediate successor. Under Arturo, the Church of the Lamb of God openly embraced the criminal enterprises that they had previously dabbled in, specifically auto theft. As a result, Ervil's wife Lorna Chynoweth became disillusioned and decided to leave the church; on Arturo's orders, she was killed by her son Andrew.

Another of Ervil's followers, Leo Evoniuk, also claimed to have been given the authority to lead the church. After a months-long dispute, the men agreed to meet to resolve their differences. At that meeting, Arturo was murdered, most likely by followers Gamaliel and Raul Rios.

During Arturo's reign, some of the group's adherents, including Rena Chynoweth and her two children, drifted away. Her brothers, Mark and Duane, and their mother Thelma moved to Texas. Jordan moved his family to Utah.

== Heber LeBaron ==
After Arturo's death, leadership of the Church of the Lamb of God fell to the next son on Ervil's list, 20-year-old Heber LeBaron. At this point, the church consisted primarily of Ervil's surviving wives, their children, and Ervil's stepchildren. Heber revived the policy of blood atonement, and over the next few years followers took revenge on those they blamed for Arturo's death. Gamaliel and Raul Rios were murdered, and their two sisters, who had been married to Ervil, disappeared. Heber had accused the women of knowing about Arturo's death in advance, and authorities believe Heber's followers killed them in retaliation.

Although Heber did not spend a great deal of time proselytizing to his followers, he fully embraced polygamy and used it to tighten his influence over the church. In 1983, Heber married two women from Guatemala. Within the next few years, he also married several of his half-sisters and stepsisters, including Patricia LeBaron. To gain favor with Mexican politicians and get cover for the family's criminal enterprises, Heber sometimes pimped out his sisters/wives.

In 1987, the Church of the Lamb of God ostensibly split into two. Heber took Ervil's wives and teenaged children with him to the U.S., where they established a large auto theft ring. The younger children stayed in Mexico with Heber's younger brother Aaron, the son of Lorna Chynoweth. In August 1987, Aaron took the younger children to Jordan's home, asking for shelter and sanctuary from the other family members. Although Jordan did not fully trust Aaron, he allowed them all to move in. Two months later, Jordan took his family and the LeBaron children with him on a camping trip. He was shot and killed at the campground. A week later, Aaron was arrested after pulling a gun on Jordan's wives and children and telling them he had been given a revelation giving him authority over the family.

On June 27, 1988, the church targeted three names from Ervil's blood atonement list. Within the span of a few minutes around 4pm, followers killed four people in three different locations in Texas. Ed Marston, Ervil's stepson, was killed in Irving by another stepson, Douglas Barlow. Heber, accompanied by his half-sister and wife Patricia, shot Mark Chynoweth at his appliance repair shop in northern Houston. Another brother, Richard, killed Duane Chynoweth and his eight-year-old daughter Jennifer after luring them to an empty house on Rena Street in Houston.

A few weeks later, Heber and four of his siblings were arrested in Arizona for auto theft. Shortly after, Aaron and two others were arrested in Chicago and charged with having false identification. Richard eventually pled guilty to his role in the so-called 4 O'Clock murders and agreed to testify against his siblings. Heber, Patricia and Barlow were convicted. Aaron and Jacqueline Tarsa LeBaron were indicted for helping plan the murders but couldn't be found.

Six of the younger LeBaron children, aged 12–18, were placed in separate foster homes in Utah. Authorities hoped that by separating them and showing them a normal life, the children could be deprogrammed and end the cycle of violence. All of the children disappeared from their foster homes on a single night at the end of September 1989.

== Further Information ==
- Janet Bennion (2004). Desert Patriarchy: Mormon and Mennonite Communities in the Chihuahua Valley (Tucson: University of Arizona Press) ISBN 0-8165-2334-7
- Ben Bradlee Jr. and Dale Van Atta (1981). Prophet of Blood: The Untold Story of Ervil Lebaron and the Lambs of God (New York: Putnam), ISBN 978-0-399-12371-9
- Jesse Hyde (Host) (2022). "Deliver Us From Ervil" [Audio Podcast]. In iHeart. Novel. https://www.iheart.com/podcast/1119-deliver-us-from-ervil-96084334/
