= Righteous Branch of the Church of Jesus Christ of Latter-day Saints =

Fundamentalist Mormon sect based in Iron County, Utah

Coordinates: 37.708384°N 113.816949°W

Christ's Church
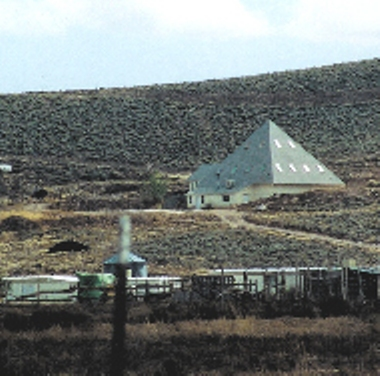
- Pyramid-shaped temple located near Modena, Utah, west of Cedar City, Utah.
- Classification: Mormonism
- Orientation: Fundamentalist Mormon
- Leader: Michael Peterson
- Region: Iron County, Utah
- Founder: Gerald Peterson Sr.
- Origin: April 6, 1978; 48 years ago Iron County, Utah
- Separated from: Apostolic United Brethren and the Church of Jesus Christ of Latter-day Saints
- Congregations: 4
- Members: 200–300
- Missionaries: 4
- Official website: www.christschurchthebranch.org

The Righteous Branch of the Church of Jesus Christ of Latter-day Saints, also known as The Righteous Branch, The Branch Church, The Peterson Group and Christ's Church, is a fundamentalist Mormon denomination of the Latter Day Saint movement. It is based in Iron County, Utah.

The Righteous Branch has approximately 100 to 200 members, most near Modena on Utah State Route 56 in Iron County, 7 miles (11 km) west of Beryl. The church's property was originally part of its founder's property outside of Cedar City, and is not part of the incorporated city. Some sect members live near Tonopah in Nye County, Nevada as well as across the US and internationally.

== History ==
The Righteous Branch was organized on April 6, 1978, by Gerald Wilbur Peterson Sr. (born October 8, 1917, in Lusk, Wyoming, died January 1981).

Peterson joined The Church of Jesus Christ of Latter-day Saints after affiliating with its members as a young man. Peterson eventually joined the Apostolic United Brethren and claims to have developed a close working relationship with its leader Rulon Allred. Being asked to work in Allred's office in Murray where he claims Rulon gave him more information and instruction than he gave to the Priesthood Council and that he had a special role in the work they would do together in future.

Peterson claimed to have received a patriarchal blessing that confirmed what he believed his spiritual calling was; this was followed by claimed condemnation from the other leads within the Apostolic United Brethren. Later, he was counselled by Rulon Allred to stop paying tithing to the council, to open a mission in Richmond, Utah, to establish a community in Cedar Valley, and to begin receiving revelation to guide this group as its leader.

After several spiritual experiences he claimed to have been ordained to a High Priest Apostle, to have been given the sealing keys by Rulon Allred, and that the sealing authority would not remain with the Apostolic United Brethren's priesthood council. Charging them with apostasy. Peterson further claimed that after Rulon Allred was killed (by followers of Ervil LeBaron) that he was seen entering his office within an hour of his death. In this meeting Peterson claims Allred re-confirmed his calling and set him apart to his responsibilities. Peterson claims that Allred healed him of long-term, intense, pain in his back as confirmation that this was an authentic experience.

Peterson further claimed that he had been instructed to become the President of the Priesthood with the priesthood authority of the Apostolic United Brethren and the LDS Church being annulled.

Peterson claimed to have met God the Father, Joseph Smith as a resurrected being (who dictated 160 songs by revelation titled "Songs of Zion"), the angel Moroni, Moses, Elijah, and Jesus Christ.

Peterson organised the Righteous Branch on April 6, 1978, two months before the LDS Church's 1978 revelation, which allowed priesthood ordination to black people. Peterson claimed he foresaw this "apostasy" through revelation. The Righteous Branch is organized similarly to the LDS Church with a First Presidency, Quorum of Twelve Apostles, Presiding Bishopric and other priesthood and auxiliary organizations. The Righteous Branch also actively proselytizes and performs proxy baptism for the dead.

As with other Mormon fundamentalist groups, the Righteous Branch believed a priesthood organization and council existed outside of the Church of Jesus Christ of Latter-day Saints (LDS Church), which passed from John Woolley to Joseph Musser, then Rulon Allred, next to Gerald Peterson Sr., next to his son, Gerald W. Peterson Jr. DO (1939-2018), who moved their headquarters to St. George, Utah, and finally to his son Michael Peterson.

== Doctrines and practices ==
In addition to standard Mormon doctrines, ordinances, and practices, the Righteous Branch also practices plural marriage, teaches the Adam–God doctrine, the Curse of Cain doctrine, and lives the United Order. Adherents wear modern dress and do not allow women under 18 to be sealed into plural marriages.

The sect uses a pyramid-shaped temple near Modena in Iron County, thus one of seven Latter Day Saint denominations to have built a temple. (Note: The other six are the Church of Christ, the LDS Church, the Community of Christ, the Apostolic United Brethren, the Church of Christ (Wightite), and the FLDS Church.) They also have a temple in the area they have settled outside of Tonopah, Nye County, Nevada, which they refer to as "the Building." It is a series of modular buildings that have been converted into a large structure that contains a chapel or assembly hall, a relief society room, a cultural hall, a baptistry and other temple rooms similar to the LDS Church. The building also contains a commercial kitchen where the sisters get together.

== Prominent members ==
Sect founder Gerald Peterson Sr. practiced homeopathic medicine. His son Gerald Peterson Jr., who led the group after his father, was also a doctor of osteopathic medicine, practicing homeopathy in Tonopah, Nye County, Nevada. Peterson first studied and served as a medical officer in the United States Army. He died on May 25, 2018.

Tom Green was an ex-member of the church. Green was baptized into the group on April 6, 1980 by Gerald Peterson Sr. Green was ordained to group's Quorum of Twelve Apostles and Church Historian. Green claims to have been assigned to research the Lorin Woolley's claims by Gerald Peterson; subsequently producing research that doubted Woolley's claims. Green claims to have presented this to Gerald Sr. and other leadership before leaving the group who did not publish it.

Benjamin Shaffer, who has a strong public presence on the internet, is also a member of the group. He joined from mainstream LDS Church.

== See also ==
- List of Mormon fundamentalist sects
- List of Mormon fundamentalist leaders
- List of denominations in the Latter Day Saint movement
