= Susan Ray Schmidt =

American author, lecturer, and anti-polygamy activist

- Born: Susan B. Ray; 1953 (age 72–73); Utah, United States
- Occupations: Author, activist, lecturer
- Known for: Memoirs
- Relatives: Ervil LeBaron; Rena Chynoweth

Susan Ray Schmidt (née Ray, born 1953) is an American author, activist and lecturer, notable for her memoir and anti-polygamy activism.

Schmidt's memoir, Favorite Wife: Escape from Polygamy, describes the abuses she suffered while practicing polygamy and adopts a firm anti-polygamy stance. It details leaving Mormon fundamentalism for mainstream Christianity and her beliefs on spirituality.

== Early life ==
Schmidt was born in Southern Utah in 1953 as the seventh child to parents who were members of the Church of Jesus Christ of Latter-day Saints (LDS Church). After receiving revelation about "the principal", Schmidt's parents moved the family to the Mormon fundamentalist community Colonia LeBaron, located in Chihuahua, Mexico. By the time the Schmidts moved to Colonia LeBaron, the fundamentalist church there was called Church of the Firstborn of the Fulness of Times, headed by prophet and president Joel LeBaron. Schmidt was married off to the prophet's brother Verlan LeBaron at the age of 15.

Schmidt had five children with LeBaron, the first being born just before her sixteenth birthday. At age 23, Schmidt escaped from the fundamentalist sect and moved back up to Southern Utah with her five children. Self described as "naive and uneducated", Schmidt eventually graduated high school and then college. During her marriage to LeBaron, Schmidt was sister-wife of fellow author Irene Spencer and sister-in-law to Ervil LeBaron, Rena Chynoweth and Joel LeBaron.

== In media ==
Irene Spencer mentions Schmidt in books Shattered Dreams: My Life as a Polygamist's Wife, Cult Insanity: A Memoir of Polygamy, Prophets and Blood Atonement, and His Favorite Wife: Trapped in Polygamy (2006).

In trying to educate the public, Schmidt appears for multiple talking segments in the 2007 documentary Lifting the Veil of Polygamy. She has also appeared on Rachael Ray, Anderson Live with Anderson Cooper, and the television show Polygamy: What Love Is This?.

Schmidt currently is lobbying the LDS Church to provide aid to those that leave polygamy and speaks at seminars and churches.
