= Susan Schmidt (disambiguation) =

Susan Schmidt is a journalist.

Susan Schmidt may also refer to:

- Susan Schmidt Bies, member of the Board of Governors of the Federal Reserve System
- Susan Ray Schmidt, memorist and anti-polygamy activist
- Susan Schmidt of Chi-Pig
