= Hermenegildo Galeana, Chihuahua =

Town in the Mexican state of Chihuahua

Galeana
- Town
- Location in Mexico
- Coordinates: 30°06′46″N 107°36′58″W
- Country: Mexico
- State: Chihuahua
- Municipality: Galeana

Population (2010)
  - Total: 926

Galeana is a town and seat of Galeana Municipality, in the northern Mexican state of Chihuahua. As of 2010, the town had a population of 926.

It is named after Hermenegildo Galeana.
