= Janet Bennion =

American anthropologist

Janet Benson Bennion
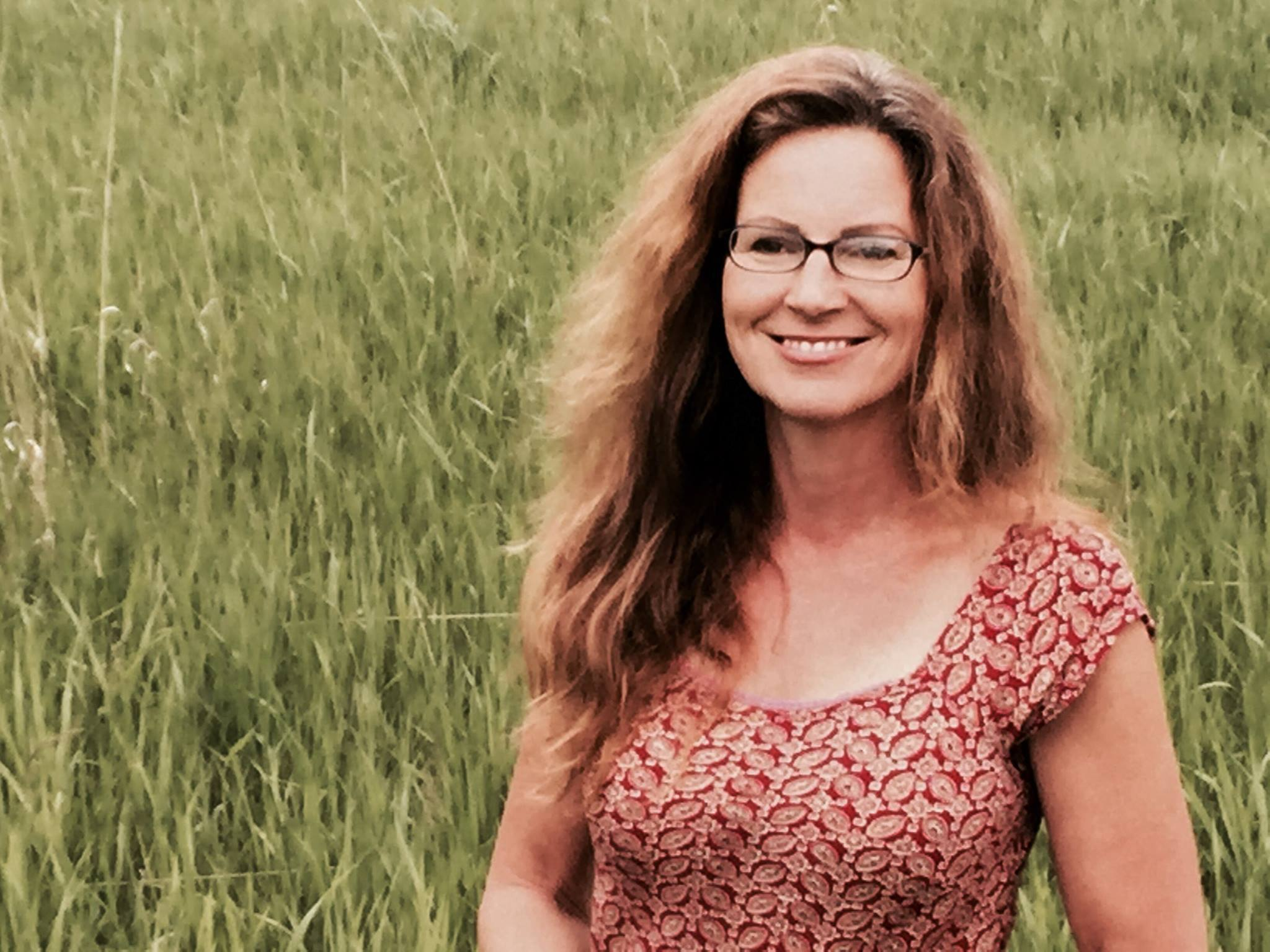
- Born: October 2, 1964 (age 61); Vernon, Utah
- Citizenship: American
- Occupation: Professor of Anthropology

Janet Benson Bennion (born October 2, 1964) is Professor of Anthropology at Lyndon State College, Vermont, United States. She specializes in gender dynamics in Mormon fundamentalist communities which practice polygamy. Bennion is one of the world's leading ethnographers of North American plural marriage. She has raised the question of decriminalization of plural marriage in a variety of radio and television forums and several international scholar venues at Brandeis University and the European University Institute in Florence, Italy.

== Early life and education ==
Born in Vernon, Utah, Bennion received her B.A. in anthropology at the Utah State University, an M.A. in Social Organization at Portland State University, and her Ph.D. in Cultural Anthropology at the University of Utah. She splits her time between her home in Vermont and a cabin in the Beartooth Mountains of Montana.

In 1994, Bennion received a Dean's Scholarship Award for her ethnography, published by Oxford University Press, Women of Principle: Female Networking in Contemporary Mormon Polygyny. At the time of book's publication, Bennion was an assistant professor of anthropology at the Utah Valley University. With her appointment to Lyndon State College, in Northeast Vermont, she received the Vermont Women in Higher Education Scholarship and the Carol E. Moore Merit Award. Most recently, she was recognized as an individual of distinction for her latest comprehensive look at polygamy, Polygamy in Primetime, published in 2012 with Brandeis University Press. The book covers twenty years of ethnographic work, examining the variability within fundamentalist polygamist societies in the Intermountain West.

== Professional work ==
Until the last decade, North American polygamy was seriously examined by only a handful of scholars, including Bennion. In her first book, Women of Principle, she recorded the experiences of female converts in the Montana Allredite order, finding that many women are attracted to polygamy because of the socioeconomic support it offers, replacing a rather difficult life in the mainstream where their status as divorcees, single mothers, widows, and "unmarriageables" limited their access to good men and the economic and spiritual affirmation that comes from a community of worship. In addition to using polygamy as a tool for marginalized women to marry and improve their social standing, she found that women in some communities hold positions of religious or political power in the community, often exercising considerable independent power. They can raise their children with minimal oversight by their husband, manage their household, and work in the all-important female support networks. Finally, Mormon fundamentalism balances the deprivations and difficulties of the lives of polygamous wives with a promise of an afterlife as queens and priestesses. In Desert Patriarchy, Bennion examines the lives of women in the LeBaron polygamous group, located in northern Mexico, where she finds an interplay of the desert and the unique social traditions and gender dynamics embedded in Anglo patriarchal fundamentalism. Bennion identifies the variability in all four major polygamous movements in the West in her latest volume, Polygamy in Primetime (2012), finding that some Mormon women experience more individual satisfaction within the dynamics of a polygamous family than they could in any other marital form. Polygamy in Primetime responds to [polygamy's] new visibility [in the media] with an overview of the subject that, despite occasional academic language, will appeal to general readers seeking more details than the soap operatics of Big Love can provide.

In her early work, she produced the first ethnography of modern-day Mormon polygyny in her masters' thesis. For her dissertation, she explored the factors contributing to female conversion patterns and investigating the intimacies between co-wives in the holy wedding ceremony which bonds women to each other and to one man. She also contributed to several chapters in books. Her examination of the atrocities following the Texas raid on the YFZ Ranch, where 460 children were removed from their homes is found in Cardell Jacobson's anthology and in her Mellen book. Her analysis of O'Dea's shortcomings in evaluating the experiences of women can be found in another of Cardell Jacobson's works. Bennion also evaluating the factors causing sexual molestation among Mormon polygynists in an Oxford work.

== Works ==
- The Polygamy Question (with Lisa Fishbayn Joffe), 2016, Utah State University Press. ISBN 978-0874219975
- Polygamy on Primetime: Gender, Media, and Politics in Mormon Fundamentalism, 2012, University Press of New England. ISBN 978-1611682625
- Desert Patriarchy: Gender Dynamics in the Chihuahua Valley, 2004, University of Arizona Press. ISBN 978-0816523344
- Women of Principle: Female Networking in Contemporary Mormon Polygyny, 1998, Oxford University Press. ISBN 978-0195120707
- "History, Culture, and Variability of Mormon Schismatic Groups" and "The Many Faces of Polygamy: An Analysis of the Variability in Modern Mormon Fundamentalism in the Intermountain West", in Modern Polygamy in the United States: Historical, Cultural, and Legal Issues Surrounding the Raid on the FLDS in Texas, ed. Cardell Jacobson, 2011, Oxford University Press. ISBN 978-0199746385
- "Mormon Women in the 21st Century: A Critical Analysis of O’Dea’s Work", in Revisiting Thomas O’Dea’s The Mormons, eds. Jacobson et al., 2008, University of Utah Press. ISBN 978-0874809206
- "Female Networking as a Factor of Female Status in Mormon Polygyny", in Mixed Blessings: A Study of Women in Fundamentalism, ed., Judy Brink, 1996, Routledge Press. ISBN 978-0415911665
- "Abbas Raptus: Exploring Factors Contributing to the Sexual Abuse of Females in Rural Mormon Fundamentalist Communities," Fall 2007, The Forum on Public Policy: A Journal of the Oxford Round Table.
- As Janet Cannon: "My Sister, My Wife: An Examination of Sororal Polygyny in a Contemporary Mormon Fundamentalist Commune", 1992, Syzygy: Journal of Alternative Religion and Culture.

== See also ==
- Mormonism and polygamy
