= Daughters of the Cult =

2024 American TV documentary series

- Genre: Documentary
- Directed by: Sara Mast
- Music by: Jimmy Stofer
- Country of origin: United States
- Original language: English
- No. of episodes: 5

Production
- Executive producers: Sara Mast; Emily Bon; Jimmy Fox; Beth Hoppe; Jacob Cohen-Holmes
- Cinematography: Anton Floquet
- Editors: Rob Traegler; Adrienne Salisbury; Jose Pulido; Glenn Morgan; Ben Simoff; Dave Wadsworth
- Running time: 43-48 minutes
- Production companies: ABC News Studios; All3Media; Main Event Media

Original release
- Network: Hulu
- Release: January 4, 2024

Daughters of the Cult is a documentary television series directed and produced by Sara Mast. It explores the life of Ervil LeBaron, the leader of a Mormon fundamentalist group who ordered the murders of his opponents, told through the eyes of former members, and children of LeBaron.

It premiered January 4, 2024, on Hulu.

== Premise ==
Explores the life of Ervil LeBaron, the leader of Church of the First Born Lamb of God, who ordered the murders of his opponents, practicing blood atonement, including Rulon C. Allred, and a hit-list carried out by followers of LeBaron, years after his death, told through the eyes of his children, Anna and Celia LeBaron.

== Episodes ==
No.	Title	Directed by	Original release date
1	"Blood Atonement"	Sara Mast	January 4, 2024
2	"The Mormon Manson"	Sara Mast	January 4, 2024
3	"Manhunt"	Sara Mast	January 4, 2024
4	"The Hit List"	Sara Mast	January 4, 2024
5	"The 4 O'Clock Murders"	Sara Mast	January 4, 2024

== Reception ==
Joe Reid of Primetimer praised the series and its approach writing: "So many elements of the Daughters of the Cult story resonate today: the notion that cult followers don't necessarily disband just because the leader goes away; the omnipresence of guns, demonstrated by how easily the LeBaron family was able to arm themselves. It doesn't let the viewer sit easily with just another murder show. The violence sparked by Ervil LeBaron and broken families he left behind still linger, both on screen and off."

Johnny Loftus of Decider.com also praised the series approach writing: "A true crime docuseries done right. Never elevating the violent, sexually controlling cult leader at its center to some ghoulish pedestal, it instead uses a journalistic eye to focus on the people he hurt most, his very children, who are given the space to share their perspectives."
