= Lebrun =

Lebrun, LeBrun, or Le Brun is a surname and a given name meaning "'the brown". Notable people with the name include:

== Surname ==
- Albert Lebrun (1879–1950), French politician and President of France
- Alexis Lebrun (born 2003), French table tennis player
- Céline Lebrun (born 1976), French judoka
- Charles Le Brun (1619–1690), French painter
- Charles-François Lebrun (1739–1824), 1st duc de Plaisance, French statesman
- Christopher Le Brun (born 1951), British artist, primarily a painter
- Claude LeBrun (born 1956), American mathematician
- Élisabeth Vigée Le Brun (1755–1842), French painter
- Eugénie Le Brun (died 1908), French-born Egyptian feminist intellectual and salon host
- Félix Lebrun (born 2006), French table tennis player
- Francesca Lebrun (1756–1791), German singer and composer
- Fromund Le Brun (died 1283), cleric and judge in Ireland and Lord Chancellor of Ireland
- Garin lo Brun or le Brun (died 1156/1162), French troubadour
- Jean Lebrun (born 1950), French journalist and radio producer
- Jean-Baptiste-Pierre Lebrun (1748–1813), French painter, art collector and art dealer
- Julie Le Brun (1780–1819), French painter and frequent model for her mother, Élisabeth Vigée Le Brun
- Louis-Sébastien Lebrun (1764–1829), French opera composer and tenor
- Ludwig August Lebrun (1752–1790), German composer and oboist
- Maurice le Brun, 1st Baron Brun (before 1279–1354/1355), English baron
- Napoleon LeBrun (1821–1901), American architect
- Pierre-Antoine Lebrun (1785–1873), French poet
- Ponce Denis Écouchard Lebrun (1729–1807), French lyric poet
- Raymond Lebrun (1932–2017), Canadian sportscaster
- Richard Lebrun, Canadian historian
- Rico Lebrun (1900–1964), Italian artist

== Given name ==
- Lebrun Constantine (1874–1942) West Indian cricketer

== See also ==
- Lebrón, given name and surname
