= Tom Green (polygamist) =

American Mormon fundamentalist (1948–2021)

- Born: June 9, 1948
- Died: February 28, 2021 (aged 72); Salt Lake City, Utah, U.S.
- Spouses: Lynda Penman (div. 1984): Beth Cook; Linda Kunz; Shirley Beagley; June Johnson; LeeAnn Beagley; Cari Bjorkman; Hannah Bjorkman
- Children: 35

Thomas Arthur Green (June 9, 1948 – February 28, 2021) was an American Mormon fundamentalist in Utah who was a practitioner of plural marriage. After a high-profile trial, Green was convicted by the state of Utah on May 18, 2001, of four counts of bigamy and one count of failure to pay child support. This decision was upheld by the Utah State Supreme Court in 2004. He was also convicted of child rape, on the basis that he had impregnated his wife Linda when she was 13. The wife in question was his stepdaughter before they were married; she was the daughter of his first polygamous wife. In total, he served six years in prison and was released in 2007.

== Religion ==
Green was raised as a member of the Church of Jesus Christ of Latter-day Saints (LDS Church). He served as a Mormon missionary in the church's Great Lakes Mission (Indiana and Michigan) from June 1967 to June 1969. In the 1980s, while in his thirties, Green left the LDS Church and converted to a type of Mormon fundamentalism, which teaches that its adherents should practice plural marriage. (The LDS Church stopped allowing polygamy in the 1890s.) He eventually took seven wives. He was also a one-time apostle for the Righteous Branch of the Church of Jesus Christ of Latter-day Saints, a fundamentalist group that split from the Apostolic United Brethren, another fundamentalist group.

== Trial and conviction ==
The prosecution, led by Juab County Attorney David Leavitt, alleged that Green married teenagers, divorced them, and then collected the welfare payments they received as "single mothers" while he continued living with them. Utah officials typically do not prosecute polygamy per se in the absence of other crimes (such as marriage of underage girls or financial crimes), and the Green case was described as "Utah's first high-profile bigamy case in half a century." Green's trial attracted substantial national attention and some international media coverage. His other wives also all refused to testify against him.

On June 24, 2002, Green was convicted of child rape for having sex with 13-year-old Linda Kunz, who ultimately was his legal wife. Kunz, who refused to testify against Green at the trial, was born in 1972, and gave birth to her first child with Green in 1986. Green had four other wives and 35 children in all. Tom Green was sentenced to five years in prison for the first conviction, and five years to life in prison for the second conviction. While he was in jail, one of his wives reportedly left him and took their children with her. Green was released from prison on parole on August 7, 2007.

== Documentary film ==
Green and his lifestyle were the subject of the British-made documentary One Man, Six Wives and Twenty-Nine Children in 2000, at the New York International Documentary Film Festival.

== Death ==
Green died from COVID-19 pneumonia in Salt Lake City at age 72 during the COVID-19 pandemic in Utah.

== See also ==
- Polygamy
- Polygyny
- Short Creek raid
- Legal status of polygamy
- List of polygamy court cases
