= Benjamin LeBarón =

Mormon anti-crime activist and murder victim

Personal details
- Born: Benjamín Franklin LeBarón Ray; October 4, 1976
- Died: July 7, 2009 (aged 32)
- Cause of death: Killed by drug cartel members during the 2009 Mexican drug war
- Known For: Founder of the Sociedad Organizada Segura and Anti-crime activism.
- Residence: Colonia LeBarón, Galeana, Chihuahua, Mexico
- Occupation: Pecan farming and trade between Mexico and the US
- Relatives: Brother-in-law of fellow murder victim Luis Widmar

Benjamín "Benji" Franklin LeBarón Ray (October 4, 1976 – July 7, 2009) was an anti-crime activist and community leader in a Colonia LeBarón community, Galeana, Chihuahua, Mexico, who had founded the advocacy group SOS Chihuahua (Sociedad Organizada Segura or Secure Organized Society). LeBarón, a citizen of both Mexico and the United States, was murdered, along with his brother-in-law, Luis Carlos "Wiso" Widmar Stubbs, aged 29, on 7 July 2009, by a group of assailants.

== Activism ==
After LeBarón's death, the movement has operated without a single figurehead. Mexico has strict gun control laws but began to train and supervise armed citizen's patrols among the Chihuahua religious enclaves. This would be an extension of an existing program that trains members of remote Mexican indigenous tribes to man such patrols. SOS Chihuahua's media contact, Karyn Longhurst of Nuevo Casas Grandes, Chihuahua, said the group desires rapid response to kidnappings (presently the police must await a police report's being filed), the forfeiture of the assets of convicted kidnappers, mechanisms for reparations to victims, tightening of judicial and sentencing loopholes used by those suspected or convicted of kidnapping, increased prosecutions and punishments for those aiding and abetting kidnapping, including through official corruption.

== Death ==
Benjamin was killed on July 7, 2009, by a local drug cartel. Benjamin was captured and beaten by the cartel, which included 10 men, all armed, in front of his family. They terrorized the wife and children and took him outside. When one of his brothers-in-law, Luis Carlos "Wiso" Widmar Stubbs (29), heard the commotion, he ran to help Benjamin. They were both taken by the cartel and were later found beaten and shot to death outside of town.

== See also ==
- Mexican drug war
- Timeline of the Mexican drug war
- Home Invasion
- Kidnapping
- LeBarón family massacre
