= Leebron =

Leebron is a surname. Notable people with the surname include:

- David Leebron (born 1955), American attorney and legal scholar
- Fred G. Leebron, American short story writer and novelist

== See also ==
- Lebrón
