= Ervil LeBaron =

American murderer (1925–1981)

- The LeBaron family (left to right); Ervil, Joel, Verlan, Alma, and Floren
- Born: Ervil Morrell LeBaron; February 22, 1925; Galeana Municipality, Chihuahua, Mexico
- Died: August 15, 1981 (aged 56); Utah State Prison, Draper, Utah, US
- Other name: The Mormon Manson
- Spouse: At least 13
- Children: 50+
- Penalty: Life imprisonment

Details
- Victims: 25+
- Span of crimes: 1974–1981
- Country: Mexico, United States
- States: California, Utah
- Date apprehended: June 1, 1979

Ervil Morrell LeBaron (February 22, 1925 – August 15, 1981) was the leader of a polygamous Mormon fundamentalist group who ordered the killings of many of his opponents, both within his own sect and in rival polygamous groups, using the religious doctrine of blood atonement to justify the murders. He was sentenced to life in prison for orchestrating the murder of an opponent, and died there in 1981.

He had at least 13 wives in a plural marriage, several of whom he married while they were still underage, and several of whom were involved in the murders.

== History ==
After the Church of Jesus Christ of Latter-day Saints (LDS Church) officially abandoned the practice of polygamy with the 1890 Manifesto, and made the practice ground for expulsion in 1904, some polygamous Mormons, from the LDS Church, moved south to Mexico to continue the practice without the interference of U.S. law enforcement. One of these Mormons, Alma Dayer LeBaron, Sr., moved his family, which included his two wives and eight children, to northern Mexico in 1924. There, they started a farm called "Colonia LeBaron" in Galeana, Chihuahua.

When Alma died in 1951, he passed the leadership of the community on to his son Joel LeBaron, who eventually incorporated the community as the Church of the Firstborn of the Fulness of Times in Salt Lake City, Utah. Ervil LeBaron, Joel's younger brother, was his second in command during the early years of the church's existence. The group ultimately numbered around thirty families who lived in both Utah and a community called "Los Molinos" on the Baja California Peninsula.

== Killings ==
In 1972, the LeBaron sect suffered a schism when Ervil fell out with Joel and started the Church of the First Born of the Lamb of God in San Diego, California. Later that year, Ervil ordered Joel's murder in Mexico. Leadership of the Baja California church passed to the youngest LeBaron brother, Verlan, whom Ervil tried to have killed over the next decade.

In 1974, Ervil was tried and convicted in Mexico for Joel's murder. His conviction was overturned on a technicality; some have alleged this resulted from a bribe. Ervil's followers subsequently raided Los Molinos to kill Verlan; Verlan was in Nicaragua, but the town was destroyed and two men were killed.

Ervil LeBaron's attention was also focused on rival polygamous leaders. In April 1975, he ordered the killing of Bob Simons, a polygamist who sought to minister to Native Americans. In 1977, LeBaron ordered the killing of Rulon C. Allred, leader of the Apostolic United Brethren, another Mormon fundamentalist sect. Ervil LeBaron's 13th wife, Rena Chynoweth, carried out the murder with Ervil's stepdaughter, Ramona Marston. Although Chynoweth was tried and acquitted for Allred's murder, she confessed in her memoir, The Blood Covenant (1990). She also described her experiences in LeBaron's group, which she characterized as using mind control and fear to control its followers.

Ervil LeBaron also ordered the murders of members of his own family and those of his supporters. His 10th wife, Vonda White, was convicted and sentenced to life in prison for the murder of Dean Grover Vest, one of LeBaron's henchmen, who had attempted to leave the church. Vonda White is also said to have killed Noemi Zarate Chynoweth, the plural wife of Ervil's father-in-law through his wife, Lorna Chynoweth. Noemi had been critical of Ervil LeBaron's practices and snubbed him at her wedding to Bud Chynoweth. According to witnesses, Thelma Chynoweth (Bud Chynoweth's first wife, who was Lorna's mother and Noemi's sister-wife) helped kill Noemi. Ervil LeBaron has also been linked to the death of his own 17-year-old daughter Rebecca, who was pregnant with her second child and hoped to leave the group; it is alleged that his stepson Eddie Marston and brother-in-law Duane Chynoweth strangled her in April 1977.

On June 1, 1979, Ervil LeBaron was apprehended by police in Mexico and then extradited to the United States, where he was convicted of having ordered Allred's death. In 1980, he was sentenced to life imprisonment at the Utah State Prison in Draper, Utah, where he died on August 16, 1981, from an apparent suicide. Ervil's brother Verlan (whom Ervil had tried to murder) died in an auto accident in Mexico City two days after Ervil's body was discovered in his cell. In an October 2012 interview with Vice Magazine, Verlan LeBaron's grandson Brent LeBaron stated that at least some in the LeBaron family believe this may not have been a coincidence.

== Continued murder spree ==
While in prison, LeBaron wrote a 400-page scriptural text known as The Book of the New Covenants, which included a commandment to kill disobedient church members who were a list of individuals whom he designated for execution. Some 20 copies were printed and distributed.

Three of the murders were carried out simultaneously on June 27, 1988, at 4:00 pm, later dubbed the "4 O'Clock Murders". Duane Chynoweth, one of LeBaron's former followers, was shot and killed with his 8-year-old daughter, Jennifer, while running errands. Eddie Marston, one of LeBaron's stepsons and former thugs, was killed in the same manner, and Mark Chynoweth, a father of six, was shot multiple times in his office in Houston, Texas.

Of the seven killers involved in the "4 O'Clock Murders," five were found guilty of murder. One, Cynthia LeBaron, testified against her siblings and was granted immunity. The final suspect, Jacqueline LeBaron, was captured by the FBI in May 2010. She initially pled not guilty to the charge of murder, but on June 16, 2011, she accepted a plea deal with a reduced charge of conspiracy to obstruct religious beliefs, for which she was sentenced to three years in prison. She was released from federal custody several months earlier than her original sentence was calculated. Although her plea agreement is public information, many docket entries are sealed. Since release, one 2014 report from a U.S. Probation Officer about her supervised release states that Jacqueline Tarsa LeBaron had not made any payment toward the $134,000 restitution imposed by the Court; simultaneously, the officer's report states that she "has severe mental health issues" including mania requiring psychotropic medication and which have led her to seek Social Security Disability Insurance.

It has been estimated that more than 25 people were killed as a result of LeBaron's prison-cell orders. Many of his family members and other ex-members of the group remain in hiding for fear of retribution from LeBaron's remaining followers. However, when LeBaron's daughter Anna LeBaron, who escaped from the cult aged 13, published an account of her life and the cult in 2017, when she was 48, she said that the blood-letting was over and family members were no longer in danger.

== Wives and children ==
Ervil LeBaron married 13 women and fathered more than 50 children. He also raised several stepchildren.

^{*} stepchild

^{+} Chynoweth sibling

^{++} Rios sibling

^{!}cult leader

^{i} Incest

Wives
Wife	Age at marriage	Killed on behalf of the cult?	Left the cult:			Comments
Wife	Age at marriage	Killed on behalf of the cult?	Murdered	Imprisoned	Escaped before 1992	Comments
Delfina Salido					Y	Went to the authorities, in fear for her life, after her daughter Rebecca was murdered.
Marilu Vega		N				
Joy Marston		N			Y	Left Ervil after 3 months of marriage
Anna Mae (Stephens) Marston		N				Anna Mae left her second husband, Nephi Marston, to marry Ervil, bringing her children with her.
Lorna Chynoweth^{+}		N	Y [1983]			Lorna's body was never recovered. She was likely killed by one of her sons.
Kristina Jensen		N			Y	
Rosemary (Worley) Barlow		N				Brought 3 children with her to the marriage
Linda Johnson						
Debra Bateman	16	N			Y	
Vonda White		Y		Y		Convicted of killing Dean Grover Vest, a cult member who tried to leave. Also killed Neomi Zarate Chynoweth, a plural wife of Bud Chynoweth, Ervil's father-in-law twice over. Brought 4 children with her from her first marriage.
Teresa Rios^{++}			Y			
Yolanda Rios^{++}			Y [1984]			
Rena Chynoweth^{+}	16	Y		Y	Y	Killed Rulon Allred, but acquitted for the crime. Left the cult after Ervil's arrest.

Children
Mother	Child Name	Child Spouse	Polygamist?	Killed on behalf of the cult?	Left the cult:				Comment
Mother	Child Name	Child Spouse	Polygamist?	Killed on behalf of the cult?	Murdered	Imprisoned	Suicide	Escaped before 1992	Comment
Delfina Salido	Sylvia Esther	Thomas Liddiard	Y	N					
Delfina Salido	Sarah			N					
Delfina Salido	Alice			N					
Delfina Salido	Lillian	Mark Chynoweth^{+}	N				Y [1989]		Helped several siblings leave the cult; suspected of being involved in the death of her brother Isaac or other siblings.
Delfina Salido	Arturo ("Arthur")^{!}		Y	Y	Y [Dec 1983]				Left cult following the death of Ervil
Delfina Salido	Rebecca	Victor Chynoweth^{+}	Y	N	Y [1977]				Pregnant at the time of her murder. Her body has never been recovered.
Delfina Salido	Jonathan "Isaac"	-	N	N	?		? [1983]	Y [1979]	Testified in court against many cult members. After a stint in a mental health institution, he moved in with his sister Lillian and Mark Chynoweth. He died several days later. Official records say suicide, but authors such as Scott Anderson believe the Chynoweths likely murdered him.
Delfina Salido	Paul								
Delfina Salido	Delia							Y [1978]	Escaped with her mother
Marilu Vega	Elsa	Dan Jordan	Y						
Marilu Vega	Jorge				Y [1984]				Body never recovered
Marilu Vega	Patricia	Heber Lebaron^{i}	Y			Y [1992]			Sentenced to life in prison for her role in the murders of Ed Barlow, and Mark, Duane, and Jenny Chynoweth. Released in 2023.
Marilu Vega	Benjamin								
Marilu Vega	Virginia			N					
Marilu Vega	Ruben								
Anna Mae Marston	David Marston^{*}								
Anna Mae Marston	Edward Thomas Marston^{*}		N	Y	Y [1988]				
Anna Mae Marston	Ramona Marston ^{*}	Dan Jordan	Y	Y		Y		Y [1982]	Assisted Rena Chynoweth in killing Rulon Allred. Acquitted. Married to Dan Jordan on the same day as her sister Fay.
Anna Mae Marston	Faye Marston^{*}	Dan Jordan	Y						Married to Dan Jordan on the same day as her sister Ramona
Anna Mae Marston	Kathleen		N					Y [1982]	Ran away from the cult to get married at age 18.
Anna Mae Marston	William "Heber"^{!}	multiple half-sisters^{i}	Y	Y		Y [1992]			Sentenced to life in prison for his role in the murders of Ed Marston and Mark, Duane, and Jenny Chynoweth.
Anna Mae Marston	Marilyn		N	N				Y [1982]	Ran away from her mother in 1982; assisted by sister Lillian and stepsister Ramona Marston
Anna Mae Marston	Celia Kristina		N	N				Y [late 1980s]	
Anna Mae Marston	Anna Keturah		N	N				Y [1982]	Ran away to live with her sister Lillian.
Anna Mae Marston	Hyrum		N	N					
Anna Mae Marston	Adine			N					
Lorna Chynoweth	Andrew		N	Y	Y				Body never recovered
Lorna Chynoweth	Jacqueline Tarsa			Y		Y			Indicted in the 1990s; on the FBI Most Wanted List for years until finally arrested in the 2000s
Lorna Chynoweth	Aaron Morel "Mo"^{!}			Y		Y [1997]			Sentenced to 45 years in prison for his role in the murders of Ed Barlow and Mark, Duane, and Jenny Chynoweth.
Lorna Chynoweth	Natasha								
Lorna Chynoweth	Andrea Monique								
Lorna Chynoweth	Bridget Veronica								
Lorna Chynoweth	Leland Jared								
Lorna Chynoweth	Joshua								
Christina Jensen	Tabitha							Y [1970s]	Escaped with her mother
Christina Jensen	Shoshanna							Y [1970s]	Escaped with her mother
Rosemary Barlow	Douglas Barlow^{*}			Y					Sentenced to life in prison for his role in the murders of Ed Marston and Mark, Duane, and Jenny Chynoweth.
Rosemary Barlow	Annalee Barlow^{*}								
Rosemary Barlow	Ellen Barlow^{*}								
Rosemary Barlow	Nathaniel								
Rosemary Barlow	David								
Rosemary Barlow	Eva								
Linda Johnson	Thomas Anthony								
Linda Johnson	Cynthia			Y		Y [1992]			Granted immunity to testify against her siblings in the murders of her stepbrother Ed Marston and Mark and Duane Chynoweth, and Duane's 8-year-old daughter.
Linda Johnson	Richard			Y		Y [1992]			Pled guilty to murder of 8-year-old Jenny Chynoweth and received a 5-year sentence.
Debra Bateman	Jeremy			N				Y	Escaped with his mother
Debra Bateman	Craig			N				Y	Escaped with his mother
Vonda White	Craig White^{*}								After his mother's imprisonment, he was raised by Anna Mae Marston
Vonda White	Audrey White^{*}								After her mother's imprisonment, raised by Anna Mae Marston
Vonda White	Evelyn White^{*}								After her mother's imprisonment, raised by Anna Mae Marston
Vonda White	Janet White^{*}								After her mother's imprisonment, raised by Anna Mae Marston
Vonda White	Mimi								After her mother's imprisonment, raised by Anna Mae Marston
Vonda White	Nathan								After his mother's imprisonment, he was raised by Anna Mae Marston
Teresa Rios	Gladys Elva								
Teresa Rios	Estephania Norma								Featured in the true crime series Evil Lives Here, season 3, episode 9, telling her story about growing up in the LeBaron family.
Teresa Rios	Jenny								
Teresa Rios	Gabriela R.								
Yolanda Rios	Sandra								
Yolanda Rios	Danny								
Rena Chynoweth	Erin							Y [1981]	Escaped with her mother
Rena Chynoweth	John Ryan							Y [1981]	Escape with his mother

== Depictions ==
Films

- Prophet of Evil: The Ervil LeBaron Story (1993) at IMDb, directed by Jud Taylor

Television

- "Murderous Mormons". Deadly Devotion. Season 3. Episode 4. August 24, 2015. Investigation Discovery.
- "Blood Atonement". Evil Lives Here. Season 3. Episode 9. March 4, 2018. Investigation Discovery.
- Under the Banner of Heaven, 2022 miniseries based on the book by John Krakauer
- Daughters of the Cult, 2024 Hulu documentary series

Nonfiction

- Bradlee, Ben; Van Atta, Dale (1981). Prophet of blood: the untold story of Ervil LeBaron and the lambs of God. Putnam. ISBN 978-0-399-12371-9.
- Chynoweth, Rena (1990). The Blood Covenant. Diamond Books. ISBN 978-0-89015-768-8.
- Anderson, Scott (1994). The 4 O'Clock Murders: The True Story of a Mormon Family's Vengeance. Random House. ISBN 978-0-440-21629-2.
- Krakauer, Jon (2004). Under the banner of heaven: a story of violent faith. Knopf Doubleday Publishing. ISBN 978-1-4000-7899-8.
- Schmidt, Susan Ray (2008). Shattered Dreams: My Life as a Polygamist's Wife. Kassidy Lane Publishing. ISBN 978-0-9779-7300-2.
- Spencer, Irene (2009). Cult Insanity: A Memoir of Polygamy, Prophets, and Blood Atonement. Hachette Book Group. ISBN 978-1-59995-213-0.
- Spencer, Irene (2008). Shattered Dreams: My Life as a Polygamist's Wife. Center Street. ISBN 978-1-5999-5719-7.
- Wariner, Ruth (2016). The Sound of Gravel: A Memoir. Flatiron Books (Macmillan Publishers. ISBN 978-1-250-07769-1.
- LeBaron, Anna (2017). The Polygamist's Daughter. Tyndale House Publishers, Inc. ISBN 978-1-4964-1755-8.
- Denton, Sally (2022). The Colony: Faith and Blood in a Promised Land. New York, NY: Liveright. ISBN 978-1-63149-807-7. LCCN 2021062619.

== See also ==
- Factional breakdown: Mormon fundamentalist sects
- Mormon fundamentalism
- List of Mormon fundamentalist churches
- List of Mormon fundamentalist leaders
