= Galeana, Chihuahua =

Municipality in the Mexican state of Chihuahua

Galeana
- Municipality
- Municipality of Galeana in Chihuahua

- Location in Mexico
- Coordinates: 30°7′N 107°38′W
- Country: Mexico
- State: Chihuahua
- Municipal seat: Hermenegildo Galeana

Area
  - Total: 1,529 km^{2} (590 sq mi)

Population (2010)
  - Total: 5,892

Galeana is one of the 67 municipalities of Chihuahua, in northern Mexico. The municipal seat lies at Hermenegildo Galeana. The municipality covers an area of 1,529 km^{2}.

As of 2010, the municipality had a total population of 5,892, up from 3,774 as of 2005.

The municipality had 109 localities, the largest of which (with 2010 populations in parentheses) were: Abdenago C. García (Lagunitas) (2,113) and Colonia Le Barón (2,104), classified as rural.
