= Joel LeBaron =

American religious leader and Mormon fundamentalist

- The LeBaron family (left to right); Ervil, Joel, Verlan, Alma, and Floren

President of the Church of the Firstborn of the Fulness of Times
- September 21, 1955 – August 20, 1972
- Predecessor: Benjamin F. Johnson (as claimed by LeBaron Family)
- Successor: Disputed: (including); Verlan LeBaron; Ervil LeBaron; Ross Wesley LeBaron
- End reason: Killed by brother

Personal details
- Born: Joel Franklin LeBaron; June 9, 1923; La Verkin, Utah, United States
- Died: August 20, 1972 (aged 49); Ensenada, Baja California, Mexico
- Cause of death: Gunshot
- Parents: Alma Dayer LeBaron, Sr. Maude Lucinda McDonald

Joel Franklin LeBaron (June 9, 1923 – August 20, 1972) was a Mormon fundamentalist leader in northern Mexico. He was murdered by a member or members of a rival church which was headed by his brother Ervil LeBaron.

== Early life ==
LeBaron was born in La Verkin, Utah, the eighth of 13 children born to Alma Dayer LeBaron, Sr. and Maude Lucinda McDonald. At the time of Joel's birth, the LeBaron family were members of the Church of Jesus Christ of Latter-day Saints (LDS Church). Joel was baptized into the LDS Church in 1931 in Colonia Juárez, Chihuahua, Mexico, where the LeBarons had moved when Joel was an infant.

Beginning in 1936, the LeBaron family became close to Joseph White Musser, a leader of the young Mormon fundamentalist movement in Mexico. In 1944, the family was excommunicated from the LDS Church for teaching and practicing plural marriage. For the next 11 years, the family were members of Rulon C. Allred's Apostolic United Brethren.

== Church leadership ==
In 1955, Joel LeBaron and two of his brothers established the Church of the Firstborn of the Fulness of Times in Salt Lake City, Utah with Joel as President of the Church. Upon returning to northern Mexico, their parents and most of the members of the LeBaron family joined the new church. In 1967, Joel's brother Ervil LeBaron was removed from leadership in the church when he began to preach that he, and not Joel, was the proper leader of the church.

== Murder ==
In 1972, Ervil LeBaron established the rival Church of the Lamb of God and began teaching his followers that in accordance with the doctrine of blood atonement, Joel had to be executed for his sins. On 20 August 1972, in Ensenada, Baja California, Mexico, one of Ervil's followers, Daniel Jordan (who was married to one of their nieces), shot Joel LeBaron in the head while Joel's young son was asleep in a car in the driveway. Ervil was tried and convicted in Mexico for Joel's murder, but the conviction was overturned. Ervil LeBaron was eventually convicted in Utah for ordering the killing of rival Mormon fundamentalist leader Rulon C. Allred. Joel LeBaron was succeeded as president of the church by his brother Verlan.

Church of the Firstborn of the Fulness of Times titles
Preceded by Benjamin F. Johnson (as claimed by LeBaron Family)	President of the Church; September 21, 1955 – August 20, 1972	Succeeded by Verlan LeBaron; Church of the Firstborn of the Fulness of Times
Preceded by Benjamin F. Johnson (as claimed by LeBaron Family)	President of the Church; September 21, 1955 – August 20, 1972	Succeeded by Ervil LeBaron; Church of the Lamb of God
Preceded by Benjamin F. Johnson (as claimed by LeBaron Family)	President of the Church; September 21, 1955 – August 20, 1972	Succeeded by Ross Wesley LeBaron; Church of the Firstborn
