= Church of the Firstborn (LeBaron family) =

Grouping of competing factions of a Mormon fundamentalist religious lineage

Church of the Firstborn of the Fulness of Times
- Type: Latter Day Saint movement
- Classification: Mormon fundamentalism
- Theology: Nontrinitarian
- Governance: Hierarchical
- Headquarters: Colonia LeBarón, Chihuahua, Mexico
- Founder: Joel LeBaron
- Origin: September 21, 1955; Salt Lake City, Utah, United States
- Branched from: Apostolic United Brethren and mainstream LDS Church
- Separations: Church of the Firstborn (Rival entity founded by Ross Wesley LeBaron, December 1955. By 1962 its missionary work subsumed to a degree into that of the Fulness of Times'); Church of the First Born of the Lamb of God (founded by Ervil LeBaron, 1972); Informal schisms: Unknown
- Number of followers: "A few hundred" in Chihuahua and as many in the Salt Lake City area to, perhaps, 1,000
- Other names: Church of the Firstborn, or "LeBaron group"
- Publications: Thus Joel taught. 1983. Church Of The Firstborn Of The Fulness Of Times, Ingólfur Guðbrandsson (2008). Thus saith the Lord. ISBN 9780615213903.

Church of the Firstborn (Ross Wesley LeBaron's and mutually rival successors)
- Headquarters: Originally Salt Lake City, Utah (present headquarters disputed)
- Founder: Ross Wesley LeBaron
- Origin: December 1955; Salt Lake City, Utah, United States
- Branched from: Apostolic United Brethren and mainstream LDS Church
- Number of followers: Unknown. (Note: Includes a hundred or more in Collier group; additional number in Green group)
- Other names: "Order of God," "Collier group," "Green group" etc.
- Publications: Doctrine of the priesthood. Vol. 1–18 (+?). ISBN 9780934964425.
- Official website: Church-of-the-Firstborn.org

The Church of the Firstborn (or the "LeBarón family") is a grouping of competing factions of a Mormon fundamentalist polygamous family community that had settled in Chihuahua, Mexico, by Alma Dayer LeBaron Sr. by 1924.

Factions accepting leadership succession by some of Alma Dayer LeBaron Sr.'s sons self-describe as members of the Church of the Firstborn, without a legally formalized organization. What became over time the most substantial faction is that of Church of the Firstborn of the Fulness of Times, often shortened as the Church of the Firstborn, which was founded in September 1955 by three of Alma's sons, Joel, R. Wesley, and Floren LeBaron.

Since its founding, the order's most notable enclave has been within the jurisdiction of Galeana Municipality, Chihuahua. The LeBarons christened the LeBaron ranch Colonia LeBarón in the 1950s. Especially in more recent years, it is a minor segment of the order that engages in the practice of polygamy.

A substantial fraction of residents residing on and nearby order members' landholdings at Colonia LeBarón are not affiliated with the order, many of them identifying themselves on census reports as Roman Catholic and most of the remainder as evangélico (Protestant). A community that has inter-married but separate beliefs to Colonia LeBarón's is a three-hour drive away in rancho La Mora, 150 full-time residents strong, in Sonora.

== Establishment ==
The LeBaron family, led by Alma Dayer LeBaron Sr., affiliated with the leadership of Mormon fundamentalist leader Joseph White Musser beginning in 1936. In June 1944, five of Dayer LeBaron's sons, Alma Jr., Benjamin T., Ervil, Ross Wesley, and Joel, were excommunicated from the Church of Jesus Christ of Latter-day Saints (LDS Church) for teaching and practicing plural marriage. For the next 11 years, a number of LeBarons associated themselves to various degrees with Rulon C. Allred's Apostolic United Brethren.

On December 9, 1957, Dayer's son Ben T. LeBaron said, wrote Samuel W. Taylor a letter saying that Ben believed himself to have received the birthright from his father and also believed Ben was to be the One Mighty and Strong of Joseph Smith's 1832 prophesy, sent to redeem LDS people from spiritual bondage.

Soon thereafter, various LeBarons declared that their family was possessed of especial priesthood keys of authority to a pre-millennial demi-messianic office or offices, in the restored earthly kingdom of God, with their ultimate leader said to possess this Right of the Firstborn becoming variously titled for example the One Mighty and Strong, the Presiding Patriarch in All the World, and so forth, the LeBarons' believing him the rightful heir of Joseph Smith Jr.'s mantle as leader of the early Latter Day Saints' Council of Fifty (via early Latter Day Saint Council of Fifty member Benjamin F. Johnson).

On September 21, 1955, Joel LeBaron and his brothers Ross and Floren visited Salt Lake City, Utah, and there organized the Church of the Firstborn of the Fullness of Times; Joel was ordained President of the Church, with Floren as first counselor in the First Presidency and Ross as head patriarch. Shortly thereafter, Joel reported being visited by nineteen former prophets, including Jesus, Abraham, Moses, Elijah, and Joseph Smith. In early 1956, the LeBaron brothers returned to Chihuahua. Their father Alma and brother Ervil became the fourth and fifth members of the new church; their mother Maud also eventually joined. Several months later, Ervil LeBaron published a pamphlet titled "Priesthood Expounded", which became a foundational text for the order.

A rival organizational structure for the order – which is named, in full, the Church of the Firstborn – additionally was formed in 1955 by Ross Wesley LeBaron, which Wesley thereafter led from its headquarters in Salt Lake City, Utah. Wesley believed he had been sent to prepare the way for the One Mighty and Strong, who would be "an Indian prophet" Joel and R. Wesley respectively claimed their especial "Firstborn order" priesthood lines of authority from Alma Dayer LeBaron, who had been ordained by Dayer's grandfather Benjamin F. Johnson, who had received these priesthood keys from Joseph Smith. LeBaron invited Allred and his followers to join their new order, but their invitation was rejected.

Three notable followers have been Fred Collier, Tom Green, and Robert Rey Black. This sect has attracted fewer adherents than had the earlier Firstborn faction co-founded by Wesley and headed by his brother Joel. Since Wesley's passing, some would-be successor groups generally are not termed as being "LeBarons" or the like; e.g., as of 2004, there were about 100 members of the Collier branch of the Firstborn order branch in Hanna, Utah with additional sect members living in Mexico; likewise, the Tom Green group consider themselves heirs to the Wesley LeBaron-founded organization.

== Name ==
According to the Encyclopedia of Mormonism, within mainstream Latter-day Saint beliefs, The Church of the Firstborn refers to "Christ's heavenly church: [...] exalted beings who gain an inheritance in the highest heaven of the celestial world." In LeBaron order belief, the Church of the Firstborn refers to those led by ones holding the "patriarchal order of priesthood" (which the LeBaron order holds as the key to over-all leadership of God's pre-Millennial kingdom) passed down via a chain of succession from Joseph Smith.

The phrase fulness of times refers to the Gospel dispensation of the fulness of times within Latter Day Saint belief.

== Colonia Le Barón ==
Colonia Le Barón is located in the northwest of the state of Chihuahua, near the towns of Nuevo Casas Grandes, Colonia Juárez and Colonia Dublán. It lies thirteen kilometers (8.1 miles) south of the county seat of Galeana and twenty-one kilometers (13 miles) north of San Buenaventura, its main means of access from Mexican Federal Highway 10. Its geographical coordinates are 30°00′45″N 107°34′03″W and is located at an altitude 1,480 meters (4,860 feet) above sea level. According to the results of the Census of Population and Housing 2005 by the National Institute of Statistics and Geography, the population of Le Baron is 1,051 inhabitants, of which 496 are men and 555 are women.

The population of Colonia Le Barón includes several hundred practitioners of the Church of the Firstborn faith, along with additional followers in Baja California, California, Central America, and Utah.

According to the Instituto Nacional para el Federalismo y el Desarrollo Municipal, Gobierno del Estado de Chihuahua, Colonia LeBaron's population was 1,137. Galeana (which includes LeBaron)'s population was 3,763 in 1996. The predominant religion was Roman Catholic, at 80.9% of the population of people over 15, with the remainder principally Mormon (viz., "Latter Day Saint movement members") and evangelico ("Protestant").

== Missionary work ==
The Church of the Firstborn is one of the few Mormon fundamentalist churches to have engaged in active proselytization. While most of their efforts have been focused on attracting Mormon fundamentalists from other groups to join their order, missionaries of the church have preached and distributed tracts at the LDS Church strongholds of Brigham Young University in Provo, Utah, and outside the gates of Temple Square in Salt Lake City. The church's pamphlet "Priesthood Expounded" and other tracts became instrumental in the conversion of nine LDS Church missionaries of the church's French Mission to the LeBaron order, an incident that has been described as the "worst missionary apostasy in the history of the [LDS] Church".

== 1970s–Church of the Lamb of God ==
Church of the Lamb of God
- Headquarters: Los Molinos, Baja California, Mexico
- Founder: Ervil LeBaron
- Origin: Salt Lake City, Utah, United States
- Separated from: Church of the Firstborn of the Fulness of Times
- Number of followers: Unknown, may have a few adherents in Los Molinos, Baja California, and elsewhere

By 1962, Ervil LeBaron was the Presiding Patriarch of the church and number two in authority to Joel LeBaron. By 1967 he was teaching that he, not Joel, was the proper head of the church. Joel and other leaders of the church denounced Ervil and released him from his position.

In August 1972, Ervil LeBaron and his followers established the rival Church of the Lamb of God. (The designation Church of the Lamb alludes to the Book of Mormon prophesy holding there to eventually be only two groups in the end times, the Church of the Lamb of God and the church of the devil; see, e.g. 1 Ne. 14: 12.) Ervil began teaching his followers that he was the "One Mighty and Strong" prophesied of in the Doctrine and Covenants, and he prophesied that "Joel will be put to death". On 20 August 1972, Joel LeBaron was shot in the head by one of Ervil's followers, becoming one of the victims of the Ervil LeBaron murders (in which members of the Church of the Lamb of God committed dozens of assassinations of both members of its parent LeBaron sect and of other Mormon fundamentalist groups).

Abel LeBaron was arrested on family violence and attempted murder charges in Galeana, Chihuahua, on December 9, 2020.

== Recent history ==
=== Succession ===
The Church of the Firstborn has experienced ongoing leadership succession controversies following its founder's assassination. Joel was succeeded by his brother Verlan, who was killed in an automobile accident in 1981. Joel LeBaron, Jr. and Siegfried Josef Widmar headed rival factions of the Church of the Firstborn of the Fulness of Times. Additionally a new Church of the Firstborn faction had arisen under Alma LeBaron, Jr., referred to as the Economic Government of God; and Floren LeBaron had helped to form a loosely organized faction recognizing no formal leader.

=== Attacks by Juárez or Sonoran narcoterrorists ===
In 2009, the LeBaron enclave in Mexico received national attention in Mexico within the context of war against drug trafficking in Mexico, especially in the northwestern region of the state of Chihuahua. On May 2, Erick Le Baron, 17, was kidnapped for an attempted ransom of US$1 million. However, the spokesman of the LeBaron community had previously announced its decision not to pay any ransom but instead to seek the release of the man, who was freed by his captors on May 10 without a ransom being paid. Throughout this event, the community spoke out publicly, both in the state capital, Chihuahua, and national and international media against the growing insecurity experienced in the region and maintained its intention to continue a policy of refusal to pay ransoms in cases of possible kidnappings.

On July 6, 2009, Erick's brother, Benjamin, and another order member, Luis Widmar Stubbs, were kidnapped and soon thereafter were murdered on the streets of Colonia LeBaron by a group of armed assailants, who left a written message with the victims' bodies which stated that this crime was in retaliation for Benjamin's activism against the traffickers.

In the immediate aftermath, the Mexicans manned a garrison in the town. In 2012, Chihuahua state legislator Alex LeBaron began campaigning for change to Mexican gun laws to legalize arming citizens for self-defense.

A dispute over water between the LeBaron "family" and neighboring people belonging to El Barzon broke out in violence when members of the family shot at a group of 500 people who wanted to destroy illegal wells on the ranch. In May 2018 El Barzon accused the LeBaron family and other large agribusinesses of violating a 1957 agreement by drilling 395 illegal wells in Namiquipa, Riva Palacio, Buenaventura, and Ahumada municipalities. They are also accused of using false documents to back their claims. Heraclio Rodríguez of El Barzon says the LeBaron family are protected by 40 state and federal police.

Three women and six children from La Mora, Sonora, all "independent Mormons" with intermarriage ties to the Church of the Firstborn and who hold dual US-Mexican citizenship, were victims of a massacre, shot and burned alive in three vehicles on a road in Sonora on November 4, 2019. Authorities speculated that the group, which was driving from Bavispe, Sonora, to a wedding in LeBaron, was mistakenly ambushed by one of the rival drug cartels that are fighting for territory in the area. In addition to the nine people who were killed, six children were injured, one was unharmed, and one was missing. United States President Donald Trump offered to send troops to Mexico to "wage war" on drug cartels, an offer that was quickly rejected by Mexican President Andrés Manuel López Obrador, who thanked foreign nations for their offers of aid while also saying "War is irrational. We are for peace." Five children injured in the attack were sent to a hospital in the United States.

=== Memoirs ===
In 2006, Susan Ray Schmidt, sixth wife of Verlan LeBaron, published His Favorite Wife, revised in 2009. In 2007, Irene Spencer, wife of Verlan LeBaron, published Shattered Dreams, and Cult Insanity in 2009. A rebuttal by Thomas J. Liddiard, Shedding Light: Some Observations of a Book Entitled 'Cult Insanity', was published in 2009. In 2016, Ruth Wariner, daughter of Joel LeBaron, published The Sound of Gravel about her experience in the group.

== Further information ==
- Janet Bennion (2012). "The Church of the Firstborn of the 'Fulness' of Times (The LeBarons)". Polygamy in Primetime: Media, Gender, and Politics in Mormon Fundamentalism. Brandeis University Press. pp. 43–50. ISBN 9781611682960.
- Verlan M. LeBaron & Charlotte K. LeBaron (1981). The LeBaron Story (a free Kindle edition). Keels & Co. ASIN B0006E53ZM.
- Robert Rey Black (2006). The New and Everlasting Covenant (2nd ed.). Robert Rey Black AuthorHouse. ISBN 978-1425920913.
- Brian C. Hales (2006). "The LeBarons". Modern Polygamy and Mormon Fundamentalists: The Generations After the Manifesto. Kofford Books. ISBN 9781589580350.
- Brian C. Hales. "MF0224 LeBarons, research file" (PDF). Fundamentalist Documents. MormonPolygamyDocuments.org.
- Charlotte K. LeBaron (2014). Maud's Story: With entire sections in her own words (PDF). AuthorHouse. ISBN 9781491874233.
- "The Mexican Mormon War" (documentary on the Mormon vigilante militia fighting a drug cartel in Chihuahua). Vice.com. 2012.

== See also ==
- Factional breakdown: Mormon fundamentalist sects
- List of Mormon fundamentalist sects
- List of Mormon fundamentalist leaders
- Mormon colonies in Mexico
- Benjamin LeBaron
- Mexican drug war
- Gun politics in Mexico
- Ervil LeBaron
