= Alma Dayer LeBaron Sr. =

American Mormon leader (1886–1951)

The LeBaron family Ervil, Joel, Verlan, Alma, Floren (left to right)

Alma Dayer LeBaron Sr. (March 15, 1886 – 1951) was a Mormon fundamentalist who was the father of a number of leaders and church founders in Mormon fundamentalism.

LeBaron was generally known as Dayer LeBaron and was the grandson of Benjamin F. Johnson, who was a confidential secretary and part-time business partner to Joseph Smith, the founder of the Latter Day Saint movement.

LeBaron was a member of the Church of Jesus Christ of Latter-day Saints (LDS Church) until he was excommunicated on February 17, 1924, for practicing plural marriage. LeBaron made a written request for permission to return to the church on March 24, 1934, but he died in 1951 without being readmitted to the LDS Church.

LeBaron's childhood was spent in Mesa, Arizona, living not far from his grandfather Benjamin F. Johnson. He later moved to Colonia Juárez, Chihuahua, Mexico, to continue his education, and there met his first wife, Barbara Baily. Married in 1904, they had one son. However, LeBaron's religious beliefs soon alienated his wife who left him, taking their child and moving to Salt Lake City to be with her mother.

Moving back to Utah, LeBaron met Maude Lucinda McDonald, and the two were wed in 1910. Together they had thirteen children, five girls and seven boys. In 1923, Dayer approached Nathan Clark, who performed his sealing to Onie Jones. The following year, both he and his wives were excommunicated "for violative conduct", the LDS Church disciplinary council being held at La Verkin, Utah, Onie Jones's hometown. In response, LeBaron and his two wives and eight children moved back to Colonia Juárez, where he sought work as a painter and doing odd jobs and was described as an "energetic" and "hard-working" man. Purchasing a "fixer-upper" home, he rebuilt it little by little as his families expanded. Onie bore six children and eventually separated herself and her children from LeBaron and his fundamentalist activities.

== Children ==
LeBaron's seven sons with Maud McDonald included Benjamin Teasdale LeBaron, Ross Wesley LeBaron, Alma Dayer LeBaron Jr., Floren LeBaron, Verlan LeBaron, Joel F. LeBaron and Ervil LeBaron. At various times, seven of them would believe himself to fulfill the premillennial demi-messianic priesthood office or offices such as the One Mighty and Strong, the Presiding Patriarch in All the World, according to a professed Right of the Firstborn (equating to Joseph Smith Jr.'s mantle as leader of the early Latter Day Saint Council of Fifty).
