= Rulon C. Allred =

American polygamist (1906–1977)

Rulon Clark Allred
- Allred in 1975

President of the Priesthood of the Apostolic United Brethren
- March 29, 1954 – May 10, 1977
- Called by: Joseph White Musser
- Predecessor: Joseph White Musser
- Successor: Owen A. Allred (AUB); Gerald Peterson (Righteous Branch)

First Counselor to the President of the Priesthood
- September 18, 1950 – 1954
- Called by: Joseph White Musser

Personal details
- Born: March 29, 1906; Colonia Dublán, Chihuahua, Mexico
- Died: May 10, 1977 (aged 71); Murray, Utah, U.S.
- Cause of death: Homicide
- Resting place: Larkin Sunset Lawn Cemetery; 40.741°N 111.823°W
- Occupation: homeopath chiropractor
- Spouse(s): 18
- Children: At least 48

Rulon Clark Allred (March 29, 1906 – May 10, 1977) was an American homeopath and chiropractor in Salt Lake City and the leader of what is now the Apostolic United Brethren, a breakaway sect of polygamous Mormon fundamentalists in Utah, Colorado, and Arizona, United States. He was murdered by Rena Chynoweth on the orders of Ervil LeBaron, the head of a rival polygamous sect.

== See also ==
- Daughters of the Cult
- Mormon fundamentalism
- Apostolic United Brethren
- Factional breakdown: Mormon fundamentalist sects
- List of Mormon fundamentalist churches
- List of Mormon fundamentalist leaders

Apostolic United Brethren titles
Preceded by Joseph White Musser as Senior Member of the Priesthood Council	President of the Priesthood; March 29, 1954–May 10, 1977	Succeeded by Owen A. Allred; As President of the Priesthood of the Apostolic United Brethren
Preceded by Joseph White Musser as Senior Member of the Priesthood Council	President of the Priesthood; March 29, 1954–May 10, 1977	Succeeded by Gerald Peterson, Sr. As President of the Priesthood of the Righteous Branch of the Church of Jesus Christ of Latter-day Saints
