= Blood atonement =

Doctrine in the history of Mormonism

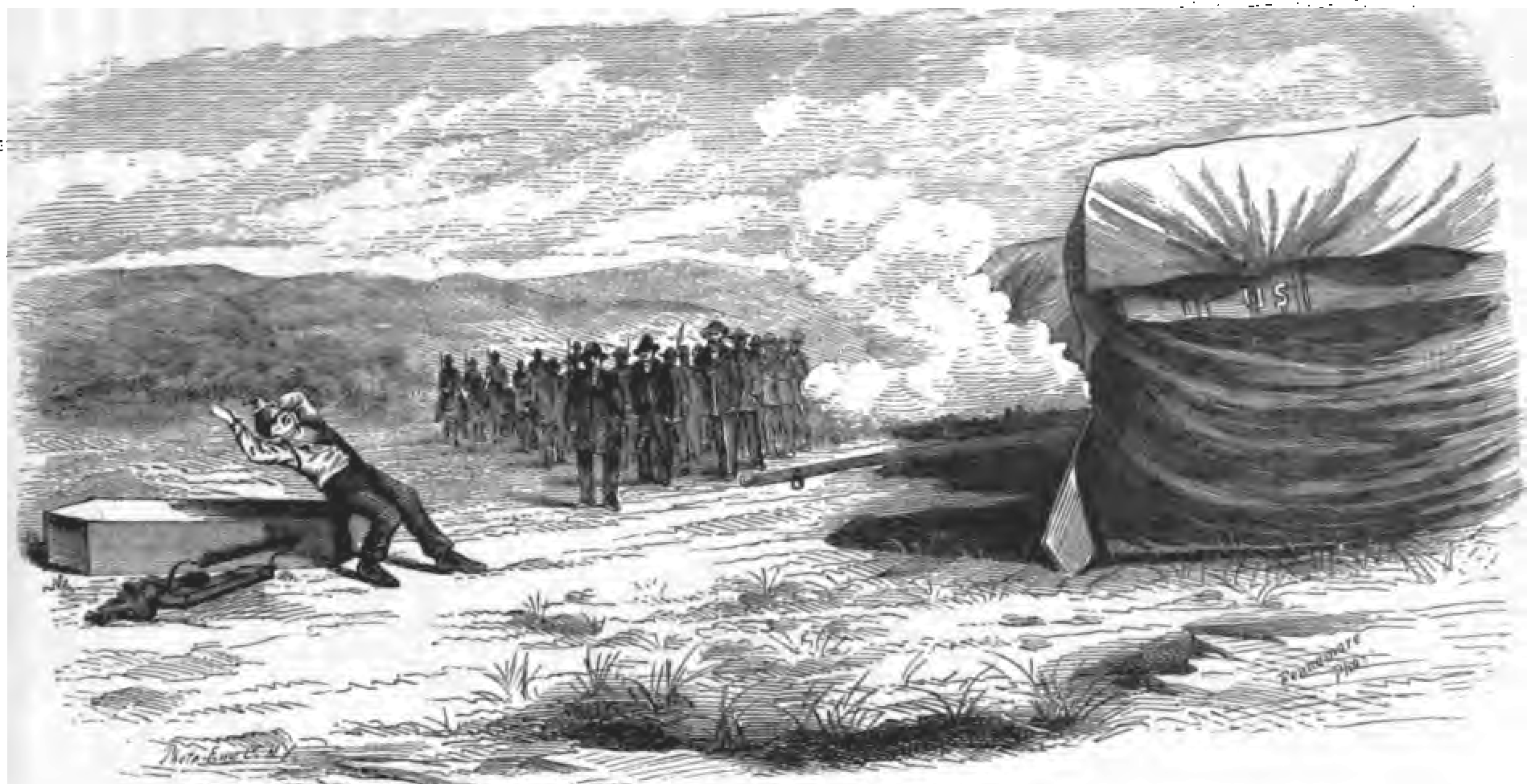
Execution by firing squad of John D. Lee for his role in the Mountain Meadows massacre. Lee's blood was shed on the ground where the massacre had taken place 20 years earlier; nevertheless, Brigham Young said that Lee "has not half atoned for his great crime."

Blood atonement was a practice in the history of Mormonism still adhered to by some fundamentalist splinter groups, under which the atonement of Jesus does not redeem an eternal sin. To atone for an eternal sin, the sinner should be killed in a way that allows their blood to be shed upon the ground as a sacrificial offering, so they do not become a son of perdition. The largest Mormon denomination, the Church of Jesus Christ of Latter-day Saints (LDS Church), has denied the validity of the doctrine since 1889 with early church leaders referring to it as a "fiction" and later church leaders referring to it as a "theoretical principle" that had never been implemented in the LDS Church.

The doctrine arose among early Mormon leaders and it was significantly promoted during the Mormon Reformation, when Brigham Young governed the Utah Territory as a near-theocracy. According to Young and other members of his First Presidency, eternal sins that needed blood atonements included apostasy, theft, fornication and adultery (sodomy was one sin that did not need blood atonements).

Young taught that sinners should voluntarily choose to practice the doctrine but he also taught that it should only be enforced by a complete theocracy (a form of government which has not existed in modern times). Young considered it more charitable to sacrifice a life than to see them endure eternal torment in the afterlife. In Young's view, in a full Mormon theocracy, the practice would be implemented by the state as a penal measure.

The blood atonement doctrine was the impetus behind laws that allowed capital punishment to be administered by firing squad or decapitation in both the territory and the state of Utah. Though people in Utah were executed by firing squad for capital crimes under the assumption that this would aid their salvation, there is no clear evidence that Young or other top theocratic Mormon leaders enforced blood atonement for apostasy. There is some evidence that the doctrine was enforced a few times at the local church level without regard to secular judicial procedure. The rhetoric of blood atonement may have contributed to a culture of violence leading to the Mountain Meadows massacre.

Blood atonement remains an important doctrine within Mormon fundamentalism and is often referenced by alt-right Mormon groups (such as the DezNat community online). Nonetheless, the LDS Church has formally repudiated the doctrine multiple times since the days of Young. LDS apostle Bruce R. McConkie, speaking on behalf of church leadership, wrote in 1978 that while he still believed that certain sins are beyond the atoning power of the blood of Christ, the doctrine of blood atonement is only applicable in a theocracy, like that during the time of Moses. Nevertheless, given its long history, up until at least 1994 potential jurors in Utah have been questioned on their beliefs concerning the blood atonement prior to trials where the death penalty may be considered. In 1994, when the defense in the trial of James Edward Wood alleged that a local church leader had "talked to Wood about shedding his own blood", the LDS First Presidency submitted a document to the court that denied the church's acceptance and practice of such a doctrine, and included the 1978 repudiation. Arthur Gary Bishop, a convicted serial killer, was told by a top church leader that "blood atonement ended with the crucifixion of Jesus Christ."

== Historical and doctrinal background ==
In its early days, Mormonism was a Restorationist faith, and leaders of it such as Joseph Smith and Brigham Young frequently discussed efforts to re-introduce social, legal, and religious practices described in the Bible, such as temple building, polygamy, and a patriarchal, theocratic governing structure. The term "blood atonement" does not appear in Mormon scripture. In the Book of Mormon, however, there are verses which clearly state that "the law of Moses" requires capital punishment for the crime of murder and they also state that Jesus' death and atonement "fulfills" the law of Moses such that there should be no more blood sacrifices.

The concept of blood atonement for adultery was less clearly articulated in LDS scripture. In Doctrine and Covenants 132, Joseph Smith wrote that people who break the "New and Everlasting Covenant" (Celestial marriage) would be "destroyed in the flesh" and be punished until they received their exaltation at the Last Judgment.

The requirement that blood should be shed as an atonement for capital crimes grew into the idea that salvation would be blocked unless this penalty was adhered to, because the "law" would remain "unfulfilled." The belief in the necessity of spilled blood and death in order to make restitution for adultery and murder was aided by a generally favorable view of capital punishment, the idea that spilled blood "cries out" for retribution, the "blood for blood" doctrine that says crimes of bloodshed should be punished by the spilling of blood, and the concept that repentance requires restitution. Although the scriptures in Alma 34 of the Book of Mormon speak of the "requirement" in terms of a legal obligation, Brigham Young described blood atonement-worthy crimes as precluding Eternal Progression offered to the faithful, stating that a sinner's crimes "will deprive him of that exaltation which he desires." In Mormon theology, Salvation is not the same as Exaltation, which has more to do with "where in heaven" whereas Salvation is "being in heaven."

=== Capital punishment in Mormon scripture and ritual ===
Mormonism's teachings regarding capital punishment originated in older Jewish and Christian teachings. For example, in 1 Corinthians 5:5, Paul discusses a man who copulated with his father's wife and commands church members to "deliver such an one unto Satan for the destruction of the flesh, that the spirit may be saved in the day of the Lord Jesus." The Doctrine & Covenants also has passages favoring capital punishment, saying "And now, behold, I speak unto the church. Thou shalt not kill; and he that kills shall not have forgiveness in this world, nor in the world to come. And again, I say, thou shalt not kill; but he that killeth shall die." Elsewhere, though, people are portrayed as having been forgiven for murders.

Underlying the blood atonement concept is the idea that spilled blood "cries out" for retribution, an idea that is advocated in several passages of Mormon scripture. In the Bible, the blood of Abel ascended to the ears of God after he was killed by Cain. In the Book of Mormon, the "blood of a righteous man" (Gideon) was said to "come upon" the theocratic leader Alma "for vengeance" against the murderer (Nehor). Mormon scripture also refers to the "cry" of the blood of the saints ascending from the ground up to the ears of God as a testimony against those who killed them. After the death of Joseph Smith, Brigham Young added an Oath of Vengeance to the Nauvoo Endowment ritual. Participants in the ritual made an oath to pray that God would "avenge the blood of the prophets on this nation." The prophet was Smith and "this nation" was the United States. (That oath was removed from the ceremony in the 1920s.) In 1877, Brigham Young described what he viewed as a similarity between Joseph Smith's death and the blood atonement doctrine, in that "whether we believe in blood atonement or not", Joseph Smith and other prophets "sealed their testimony with their blood."

==== Temple penalties ====
Before 1990, the LDS temple rituals provided examples in which violent penalties are contemplated instead of violating covenants made in the Endowment ritual. These penalties were intended to protect the ritual's secrecy. In keeping with the idea that grievous crimes must be answered with bloodshed and that blood atonement should be voluntary, participants made an oath that rather than ever revealing the secret gestures of the ceremony, they would rather let "my throat ... be cut from ear to ear, and my tongue torn out by its roots"; "our breasts ... be torn open, our hearts and vitals torn out and given to the birds of the air and the beasts of the field"; "your body ... be cut asunder and all your bowels gush out." The gory wording was removed early in the 20th century and changed to a less explicit reference to "different ways in which life may be taken." Vestigial accompanying suggestive gestures were removed by the LDS Church in 1990.

==== Reactions ====
Writer J. Aaron Sanders stated that the temple penalties were a form of blood atonement. Author Peter Levenda linked Smith's introduction of the Masonic blood oaths into the temple endowment as a step towards later threats of blood atonement for other perceived crimes in Utah territory. Historian Wallace Stegner wrote "It would be bad history to pretend that there were no holy murders in Utah and ... no mysterious disappearances of apostates". Another historian Juanita Brooks stated that violent enforcement of religious oaths was a "literal and terrible reality" advocated by Brigham Young "without compromise". One example cited by historians is in March 1857 when an elderly church member of high standing William R. Parrish decided to leave Utah with his family when he "grew cold in the faith", but had his throat slit near his Springville, Utah home.

=== "Blood for blood" doctrine and retributive capital punishment ===
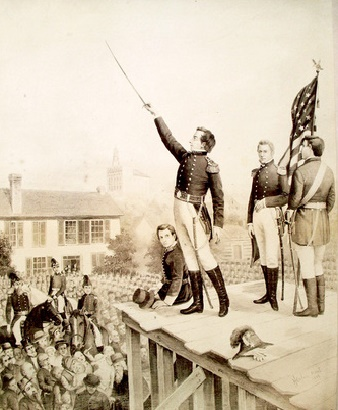
Joseph Smith did not teach blood atonement, but taught a "blood for blood" law of God's retribution, stating that if he could enact a death penalty law, "I am opposed to hanging, even if a man kill another, I will shoot him, or cut off his head, spill his blood on the ground and let the smoke ascend thereof up to God ..."

Joseph Smith, the founder of the Latter Day Saint movement, was a strong proponent of capital punishment, and favored execution methods that involved the shedding of blood as retribution for crimes of bloodshed. In 1843, he or his scribe commented that the common execution method in Christian nations was hanging, "instead of blood for blood according to the law of heaven." Years before making this remark, however, Smith was quoted as saying that the hanging of Judas Iscariot was not a suicide, but an execution carried out by Saint Peter. In a March 4, 1843, debate with church leader George A. Smith, who argued against capital punishment, (Note: George A. Smith later changed his views on capital punishment, and would write the first criminal code in Utah, which allowed execution by firing squad and decapitation.) Joseph Smith said that if he ever had the opportunity to enact a death penalty law, he "was opposed to hanging" the convict; rather, he would "shoot him, or cut off his head, spill his blood on the ground, and let the smoke thereof ascend up to God." In the church's April 6, 1843 general conference, Smith said he would "wring a thief's neck off if I can find him, if I cannot bring him to justice any other way." Sidney Rigdon, Smith's counselor in the First Presidency, also supported capital punishment involving the spilling of blood, stating, "There are men standing in your midst that you can't do anything with them but cut their throat and bury them." On the other hand, Smith was willing to tolerate the presence of men "as corrupt as the devil himself" in Nauvoo, Illinois, who "had been guilty of murder and robbery," in the chance that they might "come to the waters of baptism through repentance, and redeem a part of their allotted time."

Brigham Young, Smith's successor in the LDS Church, initially held views on capital punishment similar to those of Smith. On January 27, 1845, he spoke approvingly of Smith's toleration of "corrupt men" in Nauvoo who were guilty of murder and robbery, on the chance that they might repent and be baptized. On the other hand, on February 25, 1846, after the Saints had left Nauvoo, Young threatened adherents who had stolen wagon cover strings and rail timber with having their throats cut "when they get out of the settlements where his orders could be executed." Later that year, Young gave orders that "when a man is found to be a thief,...cut his throat & thro' him in the River." Young also stated that decapitation of repeated sinners "is the law of God and it shall be executed." There are no documented instances, however, of such a sentence being carried out on the Mormon Trail.

In the Salt Lake valley, Young acted as the executive authority while the Council of Fifty acted as a legislature. One of his main concerns in the early Mormon settlement was theft, and he swore that "a theif [sic] should not live in the Valley, for he would cut off their heads or be the means of having it done as the Lord lived." In Utah, there existed a law from 1851 to 1888 allowing persons convicted of murder to be executed by decapitation.

=== Being "destroyed in the flesh" for violation of celestial marriage covenants ===
The most immediate precursor to the blood atonement doctrine stems from a controversial section of Mormon scripture dictated by Smith in 1843 commanding the practice of plural marriage. This revelation stated that once a man and a woman enter the "New and Everlasting Covenant" (a celestial marriage), and it is "sealed unto them by the Holy Spirit of promise" (which Smith later taught was accomplished through the second anointing ritual). If a sealed person shed innocent blood, they would suffer the fate of David, who was redeemed, but fell short of his exaltation, and did not become a joint-heir with Christ, since a murderer is not forgiven in the sense that he will not enter the Celestial kingdom. Nonetheless, although his sins fall under the category of unpardonable, he is not considered a son of perdition because he sought repentance at the hand of God carefully with tears all his life afterward. Therefore, he was promised that though he would go through hell, his soul would not be left there.

If a sealed and anointed person broke their covenants to any extent short of unpardonable sin, they could possibly still gain their exaltation and become joint-heirs with Christ in the afterlife, conditional upon the utmost efforts possible being given to repentance, up to and possibly including forsaking one's life for forgiveness. They would be "destroyed in the flesh, and shall be delivered unto the buffetings of Satan unto the day of redemption". The revelation did not, however, specify the mechanism by which such people would be "destroyed in the flesh," and it did not indicate whether that "redemption" would be the result of the sinner's own blood or the result of the atonement of Jesus.

== Blood atonement teachings during the Brigham Young administration ==
=== Teachings by the First Presidency and Quorum of the Twelve ===
As far as scholars can tell, the author of the blood atonement doctrine was LDS Church president Brigham Young, who first taught the doctrine after the death of Joseph Smith. The doctrine first began to be taught during the Mormon Reformation (1856–1858), particularly by Jedediah M. Grant of the First Presidency, when Young was Governor of the Utah Territory. Public talk of blood atonement diminished substantially by the end of the Mormon Reformation in 1858 when Young was replaced as territorial governor by Alfred Cumming. The subject of blood atonement remained largely dormant until the 1870s, when the issue was revived by the national media during the John D. Lee trials for his role in the Mountain Meadows massacre.

==== Development of the doctrine in the 1840s and early 1850s ====
When Young led the Saints from Nauvoo, Illinois to the Salt Lake valley beginning in the mid-1840s, he and his followers intended to establish a theocracy independent of the United States, where there would be no distinction between church and state. (For Mormon theocratic political theory, see Theodemocracy). Young's first recorded teachings on the blood atonement doctrine were in 1845, when Young had stepped into the shoes of Joseph Smith, the previous leader who had been killed in 1844. That year, he was said to have approved of a Mormon being killed by an unknown assailant in Nauvoo, Illinois, an act he characterized as "a deed of charity" because "he might now possibly be redeemed in the eternal world".

In the Salt Lake valley, Young maintained a Council of Fifty composed of religious leaders as a kind of legislature, but this body's power was limited. In 1849, as Young and the Council of Fifty were drafting a plan for a proposed State of Deseret, Young spoke to the Council about what to do with thieves, murderers, and adulterers, and said, "I want their cursed heads to be cut off that they may atone for their crimes." The Council voted the next day that an imprisoned man "had forfeited his head" and to "dispose of him privately" (March 4 entry). Two weeks later, Young recommended decapitation for the man and a fellow prisoner, but the Council decided to let them live. Later in 1851, the General Assembly of the State of Deseret, picked by the Council of Fifty, adopted a capital punishment provision allowing decapitation as a means of execution, which would remain in force until 1888.

In a speech before the Utah Territory's legislature on February 5, 1852, Young appeared to advocate the passage of a law that required decapitation for whites who were "condemned by the Law" for miscegenation with black people. (Note: Earlier, when Young had heard that a black Mormon in Massachusetts had married a white woman, he told the Quorum of the Twelve Apostles that he would have them killed "if they were far away from the Gentiles.") He told the legislature that miscegenation was a grave sin that would bring a curse upon a man and all of his children that were produced as a result of the union. He said that if a white Mormon "in an unguarded moment should commit such a transgression", decapitation "would do a great deal towards atoning for the sin...it would do them good that they might be saved with their Bre[theren]". He said, "It is the greatest blessing that could come to some men to shed their blood on the ground, and let it come up before the Lord as an atonement".

==== Impending theocratic blood atonement for "covenant breaking" Mormons ====
During the Mormon Reformation, church leaders began to criss-cross Mormon communities in a dramatic call for greater orthodoxy and religious purity. Brigham Young, who was then a theocratic leader, began preparing church members for what they thought was the quickly approaching Second Coming, and a time of "Celestial law" in the Utah Territory. According to Young: "The time is coming when justice will be laid to the line and righteousness to the plummet; when we shall take the old broadsword and ask, Are you for God? And if you are not heartily on the Lord's side, you will be hewn down."

The most vocal proponent of the blood atonement doctrine was Jedediah M. Grant, Young's second counselor in the First Presidency from 1854 to 1856. Grant, a firebrand preacher, rose to the First Presidency after the death of Willard Richards in 1854 and became the main force behind the Mormon Reformation. His teachings in 1854 related to "covenant breakers," people who had broken their covenants made in the Endowment or Celestial marriage. At a meeting in the Salt Lake Tabernacle on March 12, 1854, Grant asked, "What disposition ought the people of God to make of covenant breakers?" In answer to his question, he stated that they should be put to death. He lamented on the difficulty in applying this in a secular democracy, stating, "I wish we were in a situation favorable to our doing that which is justifiable before God, without any contaminating influences of Gentile amalgamation, laws, and traditions." Arguing for a purer theocracy, he stated that it is the right of the church "to kill a sinner to save him, when he commits those crimes that can only be atoned for by shedding his blood.... We would not kill a man, of course, unless we killed him to save him."

Parley P. Pratt, a prominent member of the Quorum of the Twelve Apostles, was also a proponent of the blood atonement doctrine. On December 31, 1855, Pratt pressed the Utah Territory legislature to "[m]ake death the penalty for fornication and adultery." He cited 1 Cor. 5:5, calling on early Christians "[t]o deliver [an adulterer] unto Satan for the destruction of the flesh, that the spirit may be saved in the day of the Lord Jesus," as a Biblical justification for the blood atonement doctrine. Pratt stated, "This destruction of the flesh must have had reference to the death of the body; the man having justly forfeited his life in accordance with the law of God."

On March 16, 1856, Young acknowledged that it might seem, based on rhetoric from the pulpit, that "every one who did not walk to the line was at once going to be destroyed," but thus far, he said, nobody had been killed. He warned them, however, that the time "is not far distant" when the LDS Church would enforce the law of blood atonement against covenant breakers. One of the temple covenants at the time was, "I will never have anything to do with any of the daughters of Eve, unless they are given to me of the Lord." Though the "strict penalty of the law" dictated death to atone for breaking this covenant, Young said that the church would "not yet" enforce it.

On January 11, 1857 Heber C. Kimball, a member of the First Presidency, spoke about the adulterers within the church and warned that "[t]hey are worthy of death, and they will get it. That time is near by, and God has spoken from the heavens, and when certain things are about right, we shall make a public example of those characters, ...and the time is just at our doors." In the meantime, rather than atoning for sins with blood, Kimball taught that it was possible to at least partially atone for sins by means other than blood, and encouraged covenant breakers to "pay all you can, that there may not be much against you when the accounts are settled up."

Echoing Kimball's words, on February 8, 1857, Young warned the church that institution of the "celestial law" requiring mandatory blood atonement was "nigh at hand," and that under this law, covenant breakers guilty of adultery would be "hewn down." In the meantime, he said, "if this people will sin no more, but faithfully live their religion, their sins will be forgiven them without taking life."

==== Voluntary blood atonement and enforcement by individuals ====
In addition to talk about blood atonement as a theocratic form of capital punishment whose time was "nigh at hand," church leaders also discussed unofficial blood atonement. According to one interpretation of Brigham Young's sermon on March 16, 1856, the sermon encouraged enforcement of the doctrine by individuals in certain situations. He said that if "you found your brother in bed with your wife, and put a javelin through both of them, you would be justified, and they would atone for their sins, and be received into the kingdom of God." He said, "under such circumstances, I have no wife whom I love so well that I would not put a javelin through her heart, and I would do it with clean hands." But he warned anyone who intended to "execute judgment" that he or she "has got to have clean hands and a pure heart, ...else they had better let the matter alone." If the adulterous couple were not actually caught in the act, Young recommended to "let them live and suffer in the flesh for their sins." According to Young, when any person violates a covenant with God, "The blood of Christ will never wipe that out, your own blood must atone for it" either in this life or the next.

At a meeting on September 21, 1856, attended by both Young and Grant, Grant stated that there were a great many covenant-breaking members in the church "who have committed sins that cannot be forgiven through baptism." These people, Grant said, "need to have their bloodshed, for water will not do, their sins are too deep a dye." Therefore, Grant advised these people to volunteer to have a committee appointed by the First Presidency to select a place and "shed their blood." Brigham Young spoke in agreement, stating: "There are sins that men commit for which they cannot receive forgiveness in this world, or in that which is to come, and if they had their eyes open to see their true condition, they would be perfectly willing to have their blood spilt upon the ground, that the smoke thereof might ascend to heaven as an offering for their sins, and the smoking incense would atone for their sins." Indeed, Young claimed that men had actually come to him and offered their blood to atone for their sins. For these sins, which Young did not specify, the shedding of blood is "the only condition for which they can obtain forgiveness," or to appease the wrath that is kindled against them, and that the law might have its course." The atonement of Jesus, Young said, was for "sins through the fall and those committed by men, yet men can commit sins which it can never remit."

On February 8, 1857, Brigham Young stated that if a person "overtaken in a gross fault" truly understood that "by having his blood shed he will atone for that sin, and be saved and exalted with the Gods," he would voluntarily ask to have his blood shed so he could gain his exaltation. He framed blood atonement as an act of selfless love, and asked the congregation, "Will you love that man or woman well enough to shed their blood?" As a matter of love, he said, "if [your neighbor] needs help, help him; and if he wants salvation and it is necessary to spill his blood on the earth in order that he may be saved, spill it."

==== Blood atonement for apostasy ====
Most discussion of blood atonement during the Mormon Reformation concerned the killing of "covenant breakers." The greatest covenant breakers were thought to be "apostates," who according to early Mormon doctrine would become sons of perdition and for whom "there is no chance whatever for exaltation." Nevertheless, Brigham Young believed that blood atonement would have at least some benefit. Young's first discussion of blood atonement in 1845 concerned a man who may have been considered an apostate in Nauvoo, Illinois. On February 8, 1857, Young said, regarding apostates, that "if their blood had been spilled, it would have been better for them." Young warned these apostates that although "[t]he wickedness and ignorance of the nations forbid this principle's being in full force, ...the time will come when the law of God will be in full force," meaning that apostates would be subject to theocratic blood atonement. In August 1857, Heber C. Kimball echoed Young's statements about apostates, stating that "if men turn traitors to God and His servants, their blood will surely be shed, or else they will be damned, and that too according to their covenants."

According to the LDS Church's 12th president, Spencer W. Kimball, the extent of the religious enlightment of the apostates during the lifetime of Joseph Smith is not known, and they cannot be identified individually. According to the church's 10th president, Joseph Fielding Smith, a member who leaves the church does not become son of perdition, "unless he has had enough light" to become one.

=== Properly practiced blood atonement ===
Blood atonement as taught above was not to be used as a way to punish, but as a way for the sinner to make restitution for his sins. One hearsay account was given by John D. Lee, who was killed for his involvement in the Mountain Meadows massacre (see below). Lee stated in his memoirs that he had heard of only one person who had properly received death by blood atonement - by willingly atoning for the crime:

Rosmos Anderson was a Danish man who had come to Utah...He had married a widow lady...and she had a daughter that was fully grown at the time of the reformation...

At one of the meetings during the reformation Anderson and his step-daughter confessed that they had committed adultery, believing when they did so that Brigham Young would allow them to marry when he learned the facts. Their confession being full, they were rebaptized and received into full membership. They were then placed under covenant that if they again committed adultery, Anderson should suffer death. Soon after this a charge was laid against Anderson before the Council, accusing him of adultery with his step-daughter...the Council voted that Anderson must die for violating his covenants. Klingensmith went to Anderson and notified him that the orders were that he must die by having his throat cut, so that the running of his blood would atone for his sins. Anderson, being a firm believer in the doctrines and teachings of the Mormon Church, made no objections, but asked for half a day to prepare for death. His request was granted. His wife was ordered to prepare a suit of clean clothing, in which to have her husband buried, and was informed that he was to be killed for his sins, she being directed to tell those who should enquire after her husband that he had gone to California.

Klingensmith, James Haslem, Daniel McFarland and John M. Higbee dug a grave in the field near Cedar City, and that night, about 12 o'clock, went to Anderson's house and ordered him to make ready to obey the Council. Anderson got up, dressed himself, bid his family good-bye, and without a word of remonstrance accompanied those that he believed were carrying out the will of the "Almighty God." They went to the place where the grave was prepared; Anderson knelt upon the side of the grave and prayed. Klingensmith and his company then cut Anderson's throat from ear to ear and held him so that his blood ran into the grave. As soon as he was dead they dressed him in his clean clothes, threw him into the grave and buried him. They then carried his bloody clothing back to his family, and gave them to his wife to wash, when she was again instructed to say that her husband was in California .... The killing of Anderson was then considered a religious duty and a just act.

Lee refused to be killed in the same manner for his conviction, requesting instead that he be executed by firing squad, rejecting the notion that he needed to atone for the Mountain Meadows massacre.

=== Mountain Meadows massacre ===
The Mountain Meadows massacre of September 7–11, 1857 was widely blamed on the church's doctrine of blood atonement and the anti-United States rhetoric of LDS Church leaders during the Utah War. The widely publicized massacre was a mass killing of Arkansan emigrants by a Mormon militia led by prominent Mormon leader John D. Lee, who was later executed for his role in the killings. After escalating rumors that the emigrants participated in early Mormon persecution, the militia conducted a siege, and when the emigrants surrendered, the militia killed men, women, and children in cold blood, adopted some of the surviving children, and attempted a cover-up.

The Doctrine of Vengeance and Blood Atonement may have been a motivation behind the massacre, as the wagon train had accepted disillusioned Mormons (or "apostates" as they are known) into their midst. Philip Klingensmith, a Bishop in the church and a private in the militia and the only Mormon who admitted to obeying direct orders that commanded the murder of unarmed men, reported that he saw one man beg for life, saying, "'Higbee, I wouldn't do this you.' He knew Higbee it appears." John H Higbee allegedly replied, "you would have done the same to me or just as bad" and cut the man's throat. Another account tells that many apostates were killed, "when their dead bodies were found, after the massacre, it is said they were clothed in their endowment shirts."

Even though the massacre was widely connected with the blood atonement doctrine by both the United States press and the general public, there is no direct evidence to suggest that it was related to "saving" the emigrants by the shedding of their blood (because they had not entered into Mormon covenants); rather, most commentators view it as an act of intended retribution. Young was accused of either directing or being complicit in the massacre after the fact. When Brigham Young was interviewed about the matter and asked if he believed in blood atonement 20 years later, however, he replied, "I do, and I believe that Lee has not half atoned for his great crime." He said "we believe that execution should be done by the shedding of blood instead of by hanging," but only "according to the laws of the land."

=== Rumors of blood atonement enforcement by Utah-era Danites ===
Many of these rumors were centered around a group called the Danites. The Danites were a fraternal organization which was founded by a group of Latter-day Saints in June 1838, at Far West in Caldwell County, Missouri. The Danites operated as a vigilante group and they also played a central role in the events of the Mormon War. Although the organization ceased to formally exist in Missouri, the name "Danites" may have been used in both Nauvoo and Utah. It is not certain whether the Danites continued to exist as a formal organization in Utah.

During the 1860s and 1870s, there were widespread rumors that Brigham Young led a Danite organization that was enforcing the blood atonement doctrine. Evidence of this, however, never rose above the level of rumor. Responding to this, Brigham Young stated on April 7, 1867:

Is there war in our religion? No; neither war nor bloodshed. Yet our enemies cry out "bloodshed," and "oh, what dreadful men these Mormons are, and those Danites! how they slay and kill!" Such is all nonsense and folly in the extreme. The wicked slay the wicked, and they will lay it on the Saints.

Disaffected Mormon Fanny Stenhouse, a Godbeite dissenter and a prominent critic of Brigham Young, described the Danites as "Avenging Angels" who murdered disaffected Mormons and she blamed their disappearance on Indians. Ann Eliza Young, an ex-wife of Brigham Young and author of the exposé Wife No. 19, also described the Danites as still being organized after reaching Utah, and murdering dissenters and church enemies. While their claims remain controversial among Mormon historians, their writing does indicate that the concept of Danites remained in currency as late as the 1870s.

==== Murder of Thomas Coleman ====
In 1866, Thomas Coleman (or Colburn), a former slave who was in good standing as a member of the LDS Church, was murdered. As the Mormon historian D. Michael Quinn has documented, Coleman was apparently secretly courting a white Mormon woman, contrary to both territorial law and contemporaneous Mormon teachings regarding people of African descent.

At one of their clandestine meetings behind the old Arsenal (on what is now Capitol Hill in Salt Lake) on December 11, Coleman was discovered by "friends" of the woman. The group of vigilantes hit Coleman with a large rock. Using his own bowie knife, his attackers slit his throat so deeply from ear to ear that he was nearly decapitated, as well as slicing open his right breast, in what some believe was a mimicry of penalties which are illustrated in the temple ritual. Not all of Coleman's wounds correlated with the temple ritual, however, since he was also castrated. A pre-penciled placard which read "NOTICE TO ALL NIGGERS - TAKE WARNING - LEAVE WHITE WOMEN ALONE" was then pinned to his corpse. Even though it was the middle of winter, a grave was dug and Coleman's body was buried in it. The body was disposed of in less than three hours after it was discovered. Less than twelve hours after that, Judge Elias Smith, first cousin of Joseph Smith, appointed George Stringham (a Mormon ruffian and vigilante with ties to Porter Rockwell, Jason Luce, and William Hickman) as the foreman of the Coroner's Jury; they briefly met and summarily dismissed the case as a crime that was either committed by a person or persons who were unknown to the jury, abruptly ending all official enquiries into the bizarre murder.

The ritualistic way in which Coleman was murdered may have been inspired by a public sermon which was delivered by Brigham Young three years earlier, on March 3, 1863. In that sermon, Young states, "I am a human being, and I have the care of human beings. I wish to save life, and I have no desire to destroy life. If I had my wish, I should entirely stop the shedding of human blood." Following this statement, however, Young made the following statement about interracial relationships, "Shall I tell you the law of God in regard to the African race? If the white man who belongs to the chosen seed mixes his blood with the seed of Cain, the penalty, under the law of God, is death on the spot. This will always be so." Young continues his sermon by condemning whites for their abuse of slaves with the proclamation, "for their abuse of that race, the whites will be cursed, unless they repent." (Note: Young also declared that he is "neither an abolitionist nor a pro-slavery man" but that if he had to choose, he would "be against the pro-slavery side of the question.")

Regarding the murder of Coleman, LDS apologists state that the practice of "blood atonement" is said to apply to endowed Mormons who apostatized. Coleman was a member in good standing but he was not endowed, suggesting that his death may have actually been the result of racism. The LDS apologist organization FAIR has claimed that Young's statement was not made out of racist leanings but rather "Brigham Young's comments were a condemnation of abuse and rape of helpless black women, and not an overtly racist statement condemning interracial marriage."

==== Other killings ====
One of the examples cited by people interested in Utah history is a set of murders in Springville, Utah of individuals who, according to historical documents and court records, were "very questionable characters." Judge Elias Smith stated in regard to the case: "We have carefully examined all the evidence furnished by a remarkably accurate stenographic reporter, and can only conclude that evidence before the court goes to show that Durfee, Potter and two of the Parrishes got into a row about matters best, if not only, known to themselves, and for that Potter and two Parrishes were killed." – Records published in the Deseret News, April 6, 1859.

== Blood atonement after Brigham Young ==
By 1877, when Brigham Young died, the blood atonement doctrine, whether or not it was properly understood by the public, had "done more than any other thing save polygamy to bring Mormonism into disrepute". In response, church leaders and journalists took an active interest in explaining and justifying the doctrine, and in countering the negative press. John Taylor, Young's successor, acknowledged in the North American Review "we believe some crimes can only be atoned for by the life of the guilty party"; he also said, "all culprits worthy of death...should be executed by the proper civil officer, not by any exercise of the lex talionis or the intervention of ecclesiastical authority".

Chief among the Latter-day Saint writers defending the doctrine in the late 19th century was Charles W. Penrose, editor of the church-owned Deseret News, who would later become a member of the Quorum of the Twelve Apostles and the First Presidency.

=== Blood atonement for murder ===
Prior to the death of Brigham Young, blood atonement doctrine was taught primarily as a means for Mormon "covenant breakers" (usually adulterers and apostates) to pay for their sins, but a full list of sins requiring blood atonement was never given. In at least one instance, Heber C. Kimball suggested that the principle would apply to the sin of murder. After Young's death, blood atonement continued to be taught as a necessary means to pay for the sin of adultery, but blood atonement teachings largely ignored the penalty for apostates and lesser "covenant breakers", and focused primarily on the sin of murder, emphasizing that it was intended to be operative only within the context of legal capital punishment.

According to Penrose, "Murder is a 'sin unto death,' which prayers and repentance and ordinances will not wash away". Therefore, "the only valid offering that the criminal can make is his own life's blood poured out upon the ground in willing expiation." That is why, Penrose said, the Utah Territory gave convicted murderers a choice between hanging and shooting (id.)

As Mormon thinkers recognized, application of the blood atonement doctrine to the sin of murder seemingly created some difficulties. The Book of Mormon states that murderers can receive forgiveness by repentance. Nevertheless, a passage in the Doctrine and Covenants says that murder is unpardonable. Attempting to resolve this seeming conflict in a Deseret News article on July 4, 1883, Apostle Charles W. Penrose taught that in some cases such as murder done in anger or provocation, murder might be forgiven, but only after the guilty party atones for the murder by the shedding of blood.

=== Repudiation of allegations of the practice by the LDS church in 1889 ===
The practice of "blood atonement" was formally denied and repudiated by the church in a statement issued in 1889:

MANIFESTO OF THE PRESIDENCY AND APOSTLES "SALT LAKE CITY, Dec. 12th, 1889. To Whom It May Concern: In consequence of gross misrepresentations of the doctrines, aims and practices of the Church of Jesus Christ of Latter-day Saints, commonly called the 'Mormon' church, which have been promulgated for years, and have recently been revived for political purposes and to prevent all aliens, otherwise qualified, who are members of the 'Mormon' church from acquiring citizenship, we deem it proper on behalf of said church to publicly deny these calumnies and enter our protest against them. We solemnly make the following declarations, viz.: That this church views the shedding of human blood with the utmost abhorrence. That we regard the killing of a human being, except in conformity with the civil law, as a capital crime, which should be punished by shedding the blood of the criminal after a public trial before a legally constituted court of the land. We denounce as entirely untrue the allegation which has been made, that our church favors or believes in the killing of persons who leave the church or apostatize from its doctrines. We would view a punishment of this character for such an act with the utmost horror; it is abhorrent to us and is in direct opposition to the fundamental principles of our creed. The revelations of God to this church make death the penalty of capital crime, and require that offenders against life and property shall be delivered up and tried by the laws of the land.’’ We declare that no bishop's or other court in this church claims or exercises civil or judicial functions, or the right to supersede, annul or modify a judgment of any civil court. Such courts, while established to regulate Christian conduct, are purely ecclesiastical, and their punitive powers go no further than the suspension or excommunication of members from church fellowship. [Signed]: WILFORD WOODRUFF, GEORGE Q. CANNON, JOSEPH F. SMITH, Presidency of the Church of Jesus Christ of Latter-day Saints. LORENZO SNOW, FRANKLIN D. RICHARDS, BRIGHAM YOUNG, MOSES THATCHER, FRANCIS M. LYMAN, JOHN HENRY SMITH, GEORGE TEASDALE, HEBER J. GRANT, JOHN W. TAYLOR, M. W. MERRILL, A. H. LUND, ABRAHAM H. CANNON, Members of the Council of the Apostles. JOHN W. YOUNG, DANIEL H. WELLS, Counselors.

LDS Church general authority B.H. Roberts responded to Young’s statements, stating:

The doctrine of "blood atonement," then, is based upon the scriptural laws considered in the foregoing paragraphs. The only point at which complaint may be justly laid in the teaching of the "Reformation" period is in the unfortunate implication that the Church of the Latter-day Saints, or individuals in that church, may execute this law of retribution. Fortunately, however, the suggestions seemingly made in the overzealous words of some of these leading elders were never acted upon. The church never incorporated them into her polity. Indeed, it would have been a violation of divine instruction given in the New Dispensation had the church attempted to establish such procedure. As early as 1831 the law of the Lord was given to the church as follows: "And now, behold, I speak unto the church: Thou shalt not kill; and he that kills shall not have forgiveness in this world, nor in the world to come."

=== William Hooper Young and the Pulitzer murder ===
In 1902, the police and press initially speculated that blood atonement might have been a motive for the New York City "Pulitzer Murder" committed by William Hooper Young, a grandson of Brigham Young. This speculation was largely fueled by the fact that a notebook belonging to Hooper Young had been found at the scene of the crime, and "blood atonement" and supporting scriptural references was scrawled on one of the pages. Because Young pleaded guilty to murder, his exact motive for the crime was never determined, but medical experts and the judge were of the opinion that Young was medically—though probably not legally—insane. Hooper Young's case and contemporary blood atonement are discussed in detail in Brian Evenson's 2006 novel The Open Curtain.

=== Accusation by R. C. Evans ===
In 1920, R. C. Evans, a former member of the First Presidency of the Reorganized Church of Jesus Christ of Latter Day Saints who had left the church, wrote a book titled Forty Years in the Mormon Church: Why I Left It!. Evans accused both the RLDS Church and the Utah-based LDS Church of advocating "blood atonement" and he also associated the alleged practice with the "Danites." In response to denials that the practice had ever been implemented by both churches, Evans wrote:

Thus we have the President of the Reorganized Church and son of Joseph Smith admitting, as well as apologizing for the rash statements of his father and other leaders in the old church, and then we have Joseph F. Smith of the Utah church using about the same argument to excuse the language and murderous conduct of the Danites in Utah. All we care to say is reply to both of these descendants of the original prophet and organizer of the Danite Band is, that when the leading members and officers of the church for many years teach and practice, by threats and murders, ascribed to the Danite Band, then we believe the public is justified in denouncing such language and conduct, and affirming it to be the doctrine of the church.

=== Response by Joseph Fielding Smith ===
Responding to Evans’s accusations regarding the alleged implementation of the practice of "blood atonement", Joseph Fielding Smith restated the doctrine, but denied that it had ever been practiced by the church, claiming that any such accusation was a "damnable falsehood." Smith wrote,

Through the atonement of Christ all mankind may be saved, by obedience to the laws and ordinances of the gospel... Man may commit certain grievous sins - according to his light and knowledge - that will place him beyond the reach of the atoning blood of Christ. If then he would be saved he must make sacrifice of his own life to atone - so far as the power lies - for that sin, for the blood of Christ alone under certain circumstances will not avail... But that the Church practices "Blood Atonement" on apostates or any others, which is preached by ministers of the ‘Reorganization’ is a damnable falsehood for which the accusers must answer.

=== Statements which were made in the late twentieth century ===
Like several teachings enunciated by Brigham Young (see, e.g., Adam-God theory), blood atonement has been widely criticized by Latter Day Saints. The status of the teaching has been addressed by modern leaders in the LDS Church. As late as 1970, the church's First Presidency authorized a church publication that interpreted D&C 132:26 (Joseph Smith's written revelation authorizing plural marriage in 1843) as saying that even after repentance, "some sins may call for a most dreadful punishment even then—the destruction in the flesh and being turned over to the buffetings of Satan until the day of redemption. This punishment is most severe."

In 1954, church historian Joseph Fielding Smith taught the following about blood atonement:

Man may commit certain grievous sins—according to his light and knowledge—that will place him beyond the reach of the atoning blood of Christ. If then he would be saved, he must make sacrifice of his Own life to atone—so far as in his power lies—for that sin, for the blood of Christ alone under certain circumstances will not avail. Joseph Smith taught that there were certain sins so grievous that man may commit, that they will place the transgressors beyond the power of the atonement of Christ. If these offenses are committed, then the blood of Christ will not cleanse them from their sins even though they repent. Therefore their only hope is to have their own blood shed to atone, as far as possible, in their behalf.

In addition, Apostle Bruce R. McConkie agreed with Brigham Young and Joseph Fielding Smith that "under certain circumstances there are some serious sins for which the cleansing of Christ does not operate, and the law of God is that men must then have their own blood shed to atone for their sins."

=== McConkie's repudiation of the need to practice the doctrine ===
In 1978, Bruce R. McConkie, acting under the direction of President of the Church Spencer W. Kimball and the First Presidency, repudiated the blood atonement doctrine:

You note that I and President Joseph Fielding Smith and some of our early church leaders have said and written about this doctrine and you asked if the doctrine of blood atonement is an official doctrine of the Church today. If by blood atonement is meant the atoning sacrifice of Christ, the answer is Yes. If by blood atonement is meant the shedding of the blood of men to atone in some way for their own sins, the answer is No. We do not believe that it is necessary for men in this day to shed their own blood to receive a remission of sins. This is said with a full awareness of what I and others have written and said on this subject in times past. In order to understand what Brigham Young, Heber C. Kimball, Charles W. Penrose and others have said, we must mention that there are some sins for which the blood of Christ alone does not cleanse a person. These include blasphemy against the Holy Ghost (as defined by the Church) and that murder which is the unlawful killing of a human being with malice. However, and this cannot be stressed too strongly, this law has not been given to the Church at any time in this dispensation. It has no application whatever to anyone now living whether he is a member or a non-member of the Church.

=== Blood atonement in a theocracy ===
In McConkie's letter, he suggested that the doctrine could, in fact, be valid, but only in a pure theocracy, although he also stated that "Brigham Young and the others were speaking of a theoretical principle that operated in ages past and not in either their or our day." He further stated:

There simply is no such thing among us as a doctrine of blood atonement that grants a remission of sins or confers any other benefit upon a person because his own blood is shed for sins. Let me say categorically and unequivocally that this doctrine can only operate in a day when there is no separation of Church and State and when the power to take life is vested in the ruling theocracy as was the case in the day of Moses.

Regarding "blood atonement" in a theocracy, the Encyclopedia of Mormonism states:

Several early Church leaders, most notably Brigham Young, taught that in a complete theocracy the Lord could require the voluntary shedding of a murderer's blood-presumably by capital punishment-as part of the process of Atonement for such grievous sin. This was referred to as "Blood Atonement." Since such a theocracy has not been operative in modern times, the practical effect of the idea was its use as a rhetorical device to heighten the awareness of Latter-day Saints of the seriousness of murder and other major sins. This view is not a doctrine of the Church and has never been practiced by the Church at any time.

== Relationship to capital punishment in Utah ==
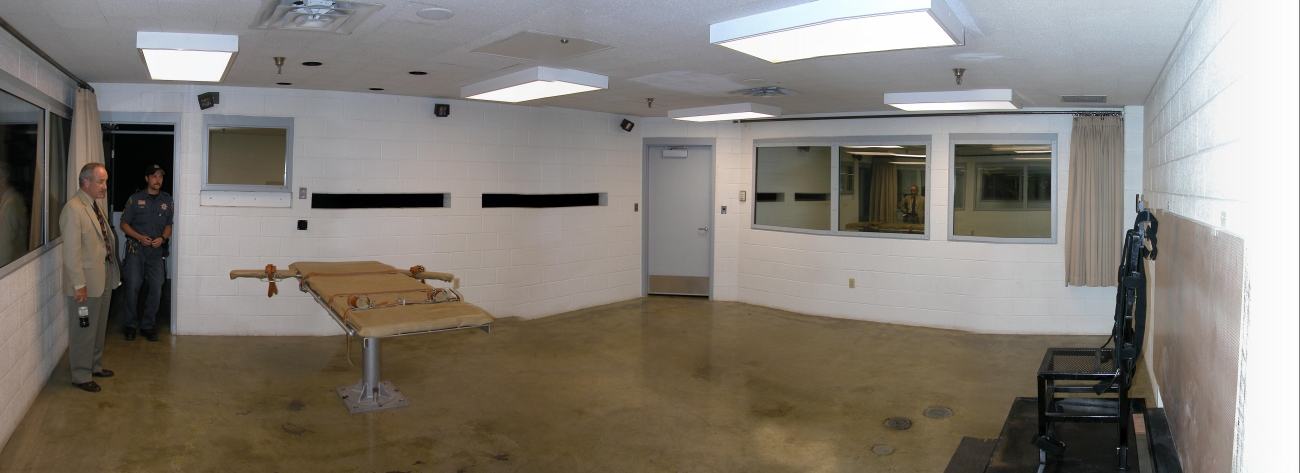
The execution chamber in Utah State Prison. The platform to the left is used for lethal injection. The metal chair to the right is used for execution by firing squad.

Joseph Fielding Smith stated:

[T]he founders of Utah incorporated in the laws of the Territory provisions for the capital punishment of those who wil[l]fully shed the blood of their fellow men. This law, which is now the law of the State, granted unto the condemned murderer the privilege of choosing for himself whether he die by hanging, or whether he be shot, and thus have his blood shed in harmony with the law of God; and thus atone, so far as it is in his power to atone, for the death of his victim. Almost without exception the condemned party chooses the latter death. This is by authority of the law of the land, not that of the Church.

In addition, in his first edition of the book Mormon Doctrine, McConkie opined that because blood atonement requires the "spilling of blood upon the ground", execution by firing squad was superior to execution by hanging, which would not suffice to create a blood atonement. Regarding this, McConkie commented:

As far as I can see there is no difference between a firing squad, an electric chair, a gas chamber, or hanging. Death is death and I would interpret the shedding of man's blood in legal executions as a figurative expression which means the taking of life. There seems to me to be no present significance as to whether an execution is by a firing squad or in some other way. I, of course, deleted my article on "hanging" from the Second Edition of Mormon Doctrine because of the reasoning here mentioned.

In an interesting contradiction, author Sally Denton in her book American Massacre, states that execution by firing squad was not considered a valid method for performing "blood atonement," claiming instead that "beheading was the preferred method." Denton recounts the execution of John D. Lee for his role in the Mountain Meadows massacre. When offered a choice of execution by hanging, firing squad or beheading, Denton claims that Lee’s "choice of execution by firing squad sent a clear signal to the faithful that he rejected a spiritual need to atone for any sins."

Execution by firing squad was banned by the state of Utah on March 15, 2004, but because the law was not retroactive, four inmates then on Utah's death row could still opt for this method of execution. Ronnie Lee Gardner, who had been sentenced to death in October 1985, cited his "Mormon heritage" for choosing to die by firing squad and fasted for two days before his execution. He felt that lawmakers had been trying to eliminate the firing squad in opposition to popular opinion in Utah because of concern over the state's image during the 2002 Winter Olympics. On the day before Gardner's execution in June 2010, the LDS Church released the following statement:

In the mid-19th century, when rhetorical, emotional oratory was common, some church members and leaders used strong language that included notions of people making restitution for their sins by giving up their own lives.

However, so-called "blood atonement," by which individuals would be required to shed their own blood to pay for their sins, is not a doctrine of The Church of Jesus Christ of Latter-day Saints. We believe in and teach the infinite and all-encompassing atonement of Jesus Christ, which makes forgiveness of sin and salvation possible for all people.

== The practice of "blood atonement" by Mormon fundamentalist groups ==
In modern times, the concept of "blood atonement" has been used by a number of fundamentalist splinter groups as an excuse to justify the murder of those who disagree with their leaders or attempt to leave their churches. These groups all claim to follow the "original" teachings of Joseph Smith and Brigham Young, and they also claim that the LDS Church has strayed from the proper path by banning these practices. This concept is attributable to a tendency towards extreme "literalism" that exists with regard to the interpretation of early doctrines.

=== Warren Jeffs and the Fundamentalist Church of Jesus Christ of Latter Day Saints ===
Warren Jeffs, leader of the LDS splinter-group Fundamentalist Church of Jesus Christ of Latter Day Saints (FLDS), a polygamous sect based in Arizona and Utah, USA, has allegedly indicated his desire to implement the doctrine in his church. Former FLDS member Robert Richter reported to the Phoenix New Times that in his sermons, Jeffs repeatedly alluded to blood atonement for serious sins such as murder and adultery. Richter also claims that he was asked to design a thermostat for a high temperature furnace that would be capable of destroying DNA evidence if such "atonements" were to take place.

=== Ervil LeBaron and the Church of the Lamb of God ===
Ervil LeBaron, the leader and prophet of the Church of the Lamb of God, initiated a series of killings that ultimately resulted in his being sentenced to life in prison. Before his death in prison, LeBaron wrote a document he called The Book of the New Covenants. This document listed a number of people who had been disloyal and "deserved to die." Copies of this list fell into the hands of LeBaron's followers, who proceeded to administer what they called "blood atonement" to the individuals listed.

One of LeBaron's daughters, Lillian Chynoweth, related an account of some of these killings in the film The God Makers II. Chynoweth discussed the murder of her husband, her brother-in-law and his 8-year-old daughter by her half brothers on 27 June, the 144th anniversary of the death of Joseph Smith. She stated that their names were "on the list to be atoned for" because her father believed that they were "traitors to God’s cause." Not explicitly named in the film, this list was Ervil LeBaron's ‘‘The Book of the New Covenants’’. Chynoweth added that if anything happened to her, the "Mormon" church would be responsible. Shortly after the interview, according to the film, she was found dead in her home from a self-inflicted gunshot wound.

== References to "blood atonement" in modern literary works ==
A number of modern authors refer to "blood atonement," usually in association with "Danites." These references often appear in works that are critical of the LDS Church, and rumors of "Danites" practicing some form of "blood atonement" often play a significant role in these accounts.

In her book Leaving the Saints, Martha Beck postulates the existence of a "Danite" band "disposing" of people who opposed Brigham Young:

Brigham Young formalized and anointed these assassins as the Danites, whose mission included espionage, the suppression of information, and quietly, permanently disposing of people who threatened the Mormon prophet or the Latter-day Saint organization. Again, not many Mormons know this detail of Church history, but every now and then, Utah papers record murders with uniquely Mormon flavoring (death by temple-sanctioned methods, for example), and the word that goes out on the Latter-day grapevine is Danite. (Note: LDS scholars describe a contradiction between the existence of a "Latter-day grapevine" that is aware of "Danites" and the statement that "not many Mormons know this detail of Church history")

In her book American Massacre, Sally Denton claims that the Danites and "blood atonement" played a prominent role in 19th century Utah society. Denton attributes the creation of the Danites to Joseph Smith and believes that he considered them to be his "secret group of loyalists." She also suggests that they became "one of the most legendarily feared bands in frontier America." According to Denton, this "consecrated, clandestine unit of divinely inspired assassins" introduced "the ritualized form of murder called blood atonement-providing the victim with eternal salvation by slitting his throat." Denton claims that "blood atonement" was one of the doctrines Mormons held "most sacred" and "[t]hose who dared to flee Zion were hunted down and killed." Denton implies that large numbers of such "atonements" occurred during the Mormon reformation of 1856, although "none of the crimes were ever reported in the Deseret News," and the "bloody regime...ended with [Jedediah] Grant’s sudden death, on December 1, 1856."

Blood atonement has been a part of works such as Levi S. Peterson's The Backslider (1986) and Richard Dutcher's "Expiation" (2013).

Corb Lund's 2007 album Horse Soldier! Horse Soldier! contains a song "Brother Brigham, Brother Young" which describes a man confessing to Brigham Young that he has sinned greatly (revealed temple secrets, apostatized, doubted, adulterized, and married interracially) and requesting that he be subject to blood atonement.

For water cannot save me, Brother Brigham, Brother Young
Baptismal water cannot save me, Brigham Young
My sins are just too deep a dye, o Brother Brigham, Brother Young
My sins are just too deep a stain, o Brother Young

So send Avenging Angels, Brother Brigham, Brother Young
Won't you send Destroying Danites, Brother Young
To spill my blood upon the earth, o Brother Brigham, Brother Young
I beg you spill my blood, o Brother Young

And let its smoke ascend to heaven. Brother Brigham, Brother Young
And let my breast be cut asunder, Brother Young
As an offering for my sins, a smoking incense, Brother Young
A blood atoning for my sinning, Brother Young

The line "let its smoke ascend to heaven" borrows language from a Joseph Smith quote, as well as a 1856 sermon by Brigham Young. The line "let my breast be cut asunder" borrows the language from the Penalties.

The 2024 short film The Angel depicts two sister wives in the 1870s who receive a supernatural visitation from what may-or-may-not be an angel, who asks them kill their husband. "Shed his blood, that the smoke thereof might ascend to heaven. When it spills upon the ground, ye shall be made free." This borrows much of the language of blood atonement, although it is not a typical case as the supernatural figure threatens a curse if it is not fulfilled.

== See also ==
- Capital punishment
- Gladdenites (Attempted move to Utah)
- Honor killing, comparable practice observed in several regions of the world
