= Alma A. Timpson =

Fundamentalist Mormon church leader (1909–2002)

Priesthood Head of the Centennial Park group
- 1988 – 1997
- Successor: John W. Timpson

Personal details
- Born: March 28, 1905; Iona, Idaho, United States
- Died: April 2, 1997 (aged 92)
- Resting place: Centennial Park Cemetery, Mohave County, Arizona
- Spouse(s): June Greenwood Waters (m. 1930) Guinevere Woolley (m. 1944) Arvena "Ruth" Smith (m. 1953): Kathy Jessop; Margery DeHart
- Children: 66, including William E. Jessop
- Parents: John Herbert Timpson; Jeanetta Ann Timpson

Alma Adelbert "Del" Timpson (March 28, 1905 – April 2, 1997), was an American Mormon fundamentalist leader. He was involved with a number of Mormon denominations, including the mainstream LDS Church, followed by the Council of Friends, and eventually heading the Centennial Park group, a fundamentalist sect headquartered in Centennial Park, Arizona. In each denomination, he held positions of importance within the priesthood and leadership structures.

As a practitioner of plural marriage, Timpson had at least five wives throughout his life. At the time of his death in 1997 at age 92, he was survived by over 550 descendants.

== Biography ==
=== Early life ===
Alma Adelbert Timpson was born to English-immigrant John Herbert Timpson and Jeanetta Ann Timpson on March 28, 1905, in Iona, Idaho. His family were practicing polygamists and members of the Church of Jesus Christ of Latter-day Saints; his father had wives Jeanetta and Sarah from before the church disavowing plural marriage with the 1890 Manifesto. Timpson served a mission for the LDS Church in England for two years starting in 1925. Since Timpson was dedicated to practicing plural marriage like his family, he did not agree with mainstream LDS doctrine. Timpson's son John stated "He had a great love for the church. Turning his back on the church wasn't an easy thing for him to do."

By 1941, Timpson had risen to a Seventy. On February 13, 1941, he was excommunicated from the LDS Church for advocating for plural marriage. In 1945, then aged 40, Timpson and 14 other high-profile polygamists were convicted of "unlawful cohabitation" and other crimes, and were sent to prison for up to five years. They started their sentences in May 1945. After eight months, in December, Timpson and nine others (including John Y. Barlow; Joseph White Musser; and Rulon C. Allred) signed an "oath pledging to not advocate, teach or "countenance" the practice" of polygamy and were released. Musser died nine years later in 1954, and Timpson was a pall-bearer at his funeral service along with Leroy S. Johnson, Rulon Jeffs, and Richard Jessop.

=== Split from Council of Friends ===
Timpson became a member of the Council of Friends, an organization that became the Fundamentalist Church of Jesus Christ of Latter-Day Saints, though it was not known by that name at that time. The council was then headed by prophet John Y. Barlow who called Timpson to the group's Priesthood Council. After Barlow's death, the group was headed by Leroy S. Johnson. Johnson viewed Timpson as a threat, and expelled him and J. Marion Hammon from the congregation during a sermon, stating, "The Lord gave you men five and a half years to change your thinking on this principle of having one man holding the sealing powers in the earth at a time, and you have made a mess of it." Timpson's wife Kathy did not follow him, and she stayed in the Council of Friends with their son William; when Kathy remarried Merril Jessop, William took his new father's surname. On May 13, 1984, Timpson and Hammon held their first priesthood meeting outside the council, and they soon founded their own sect which came to be called the Centennial Park group. As both the Council and the Centennial Park group were located in the Short Creek Community, members of different factions live among one another.

=== Centennial Park group ===
About 80 percent of the Council group stayed under Johnson's leadership (referred to as the "First Ward"), while the other 20 percent followed Hammon and Timpson in what they came to call the Centennial Park group, or "Second Ward". Hammon and Timpson led the Centennial Park group until Hammon's death in 1988. That left Timpson as the presiding priesthood holder. After Timpson was left in control, a splinter group of about 200 people left the group and formed The Church of Jesus Christ of Latter-day Saints and the Kingdom of God, or the "Third Ward", another fundamentalist sect. As sole leader of the Centennial group, Timpson soon called his son John as an apostle. Timpson controlled the community until his death.

=== Family and death ===
Timpson died on April 2, 1997, after which his son John Timpson assumed control of the community. At the time of his death, Timpson had over 550 descendants: 66 children; "approximately" 347 grandchildren; and 151 great-grandchildren. His wives are listed by chronological marriage date (if known):

- June Greenwood Waters. Waters and Timpson married 1930. She was listed as a victim in the 1944 plural marriage case against Timpson, who "attempted to convert June Greenwood Waters Timpton to believe in and live polygamy." That charge led to his 1945 prison sentence.
- Guinevere Woolley Timpson (also spelled Guenevere in some sources), who was born on January 20, 1914, in Ogden, Utah to Franklin Benjamin Woolley and Ellie Seegmiller Woolley as the youngest of their 12 children. She first married John C. Cawley before he died in a car accident in December 1937. She then married Timpson on April 25, 1944. She outlived Timpson by 15 years and died on March 17, 2012, in Colorado City.
- Arvena "Ruth" Smith Timpson, who was born on August 18, 1913, in Chester, Idaho to Samuel Houston Smith and Ethel Cooke. She first married Karl Hammond on November 22, 1932, and after that divorce married Timpson on August 22, 1953. She outlived her husband by four years, and died on January 20, 2001.
- Kathy, who split from Timpson in the 1980s and remarried Merril Jessop, taking the latter's last name. She became a sister-wife of Carolyn Jessop, another of Merril's multiple wives.
- Margery DeHart Timpson, who was born April 2, 1908, to Peter and Annie Kershaw DeHart in Ogden, Utah. She died at her home on September 3, 1990, in Colorado City, predeceasing her husband by seven years.

== See also ==
- List of Mormon fundamentalist leaders
