= List of former Mormon fundamentalists =

List of former members of Mormon fundamentalist groups

This is a list of former members of Mormon fundamentalism churches.

== Former members ==
=== Fundamentalist Church of Jesus Christ of Latter-Day Saints (FLDS) ===
- Brent W. Jeffs
- Carolyn Jessop
- Flora Jessop
- Ruby Jessop
- Rebecca Musser
- Elissa Wall

=== Apostolic United Brethren (AUB) ===
- Lance Allred
- Dorothy Allred Solomon

=== Church of the Firstborn of the Fulness of Times ===
- Susan Ray Schmidt
- Irene Spencer

=== Others ===
These former members belonged to different polygamist groups; FLDS, AUB, Church of the Firstborn of the Fulness of Times and other LDS polygamist groups.

- Cathleen Hansen
- Doris Hanson
- Janis Hutchinson
- Howard Mackert
- Mary Mackert
- David McGaughey
- Paul Owen
