= Polygamy in North America =

Polygamy is the practice of having more than one spouse at the same time. Specifically, polygyny is the practice of one man taking more than one wife while polyandry is the practice of one woman taking more than one husband. Polygamy is a common marriage pattern in some parts of the world. In North America, polygamy has not been a culturally normative or legally recognized institution since the continent's colonization by Europeans.

Polygamy became a significant social and political issue in the United States in 1852, when the Church of Jesus Christ of Latter-day Saints (LDS Church) made it known that a form of the practice, called plural marriage, was part of its doctrine. Opposition to the practice by the United States government resulted in an intense legal conflict, and culminated in LDS Church president Wilford Woodruff announcing the church's official abandonment of the practice on September 25, 1890. However, breakaway Mormon fundamentalist groups living mostly in the western United States, Canada, and Mexico still practice plural marriage. In the United States, de facto polygamy is illegal under federal law, under the Edmunds Act, and all states have laws against bigamy.

== Definition ==
Polygamy is defined as the practice or condition of one person having more than one spouse at the same time, conventionally referring to a situation where all spouses know about each other, in contrast to bigamy, where two or more spouses are usually unaware of each other. Polyandry is the name of the practice or condition when one female has more than one male spouse at the same time.

== Legality ==
=== Canada ===
In Canada, polygamy is a criminal offence under section 293 of the Criminal Code, which provides for a penalty of up to five years imprisonment, but prosecutions are rare. As of January 2009, no person had been prosecuted for polygamy in Canada in over sixty years. This changed in 2014, when polygamy charges were brought against Winston Blackmore and James Oler. On March 9, 2018, the Supreme Court of British Columbia reaffirmed the constitutionality of Canada's anti-polygamy laws, upholding the July 2017 polygamy convictions of Winston Blackmore and James Oler.

The federal Criminal Code applies throughout the country. It extends the normal definition of polygamy to having any kind of conjugal union with more than one person at the same time. Anyone who assists, celebrates, or is a part to a rite, ceremony, or contract that sanctions a polygamist relationship is also guilty of polygamy. Polygamy is an offence punishable by up to five years in prison.

Edith Barlow, a mother of five in the polygamous community of Bountiful, B.C., was denied permanent residence and was asked to leave the country after ten years in Canada.

==== Alberta ====
A 2005 report by the Alberta Civil Liberties Research Centre recommended that Canada decriminalize polygamy, stating: "Criminalization is not the most effective way of dealing with gender inequality in polygamous and plural union relationships. Furthermore, it may violate the constitutional rights of the parties involved."

==== British Columbia ====
In 2007, the Attorney General of British Columbia expressed concerns over whether this prohibition is constitutional, and an independent prosecutor in British Columbia recommended that Canadian courts be asked to rule on the constitutionality of laws against polygamy. The Supreme Court of British Columbia upheld Canada's anti-polygamy section 293 of the Criminal Code and other ancillary legislation in a 2011 reference case. On March 9, 2018, the Supreme Court of British Columbia upheld the constitutionality of Canada's anti-polygamy laws again.

=== Mexico ===
Prior to Spanish colonization, polygamy (polygyny) was widely accepted and practiced by the indigenous people of what is now Mexico. In contrast to Eurocentric views of marriage and property in which land and other belongings were perceived as being owned by individuals or couples, indigenous people regarded property in a more communal manner, facilitating the existence of polygamy. This practice was most commonly practiced amongst the elites of the Aztecs (pipiltin), whereas average members of the society (macehualtin) were more likely to keep to monogamous relationships. Because the number of wives that one could marry was based on the male's economic capacity, calpulli leaders and pipiltin were the only members of the community capable of maintaining multiple wives.

At the turn of the 16th century, the Catholic Monarchs of Spain, Queen Isabella I of Castille and King Ferdinand II of Aragon, began their imposition and conquest on indigenous peoples. Citing the Sixth Commandment of the Roman Catholic Bible as reason for prohibition of polygamy, the so-called Laws of Toro (1505) were instituted. These gave the Roman Catholic Church exclusive control over the statues for legitimization of marriage, and declared monogamy to be the only legitimate form of marriage.

In 1876, Anglo-Saxon Mormons from the United States fled to the Mexican states of Sonora and Chihuahua after the prohibition of polygamy in the United States. Ten years later, the Book of Mormon was translated to Spanish by Meliton G. Trejo and Jamie Z. Stewart. In 1895, Mormonism in Mexico took root with its own colony in Ciudad Juárez. In 1937, Nahua-Mexican evangelist, Margarito Bautista, presented himself among the Third Convention, advocating for the reinstatement of plural marriage. However, Bautista's plead was quickly rejected and he was expelled from the movement.

Today, polygamy is illegal in Mexico and its consequences are outlined in the 16th Title of the 2nd Volume of the Federal Penal Code, called "Against Civil Status and Bigamy" under Article 279. The marriage of more than one partner can result in up to a five year sentence in federal prison. However, some unofficial cases of polygamy remain present in the country.

=== United States ===
Bigamy laws throughout the United States Infraction Misdemeanor Felony All forms of cohabitation outlawed

Polygamy is a crime and punishable by a fine, imprisonment, or both, according to the law of the individual state and the circumstances of the offense. Polygamy was outlawed in federal territories by the Edmunds Act, and there are laws against the practice in all 50 states, as well as the District of Columbia, Guam, and Puerto Rico. Because state laws exist, polygamy is not actively prosecuted at the federal level, but the practice is considered "against public policy".

Many US courts (e.g. Turner v. S., 212 Miss. 590, 55 So.2d 228) treat bigamy as a strict liability crime: in some jurisdictions, a person can be convicted of a felony even if he reasonably believed he had only one legal spouse. For example, if a person has the mistaken belief that their previous spouse is dead or that their divorce is final, they can still be convicted of bigamy if they marry a new person.

Utah reduced polygamy from a third-degree felony to a minor infraction on May 13, 2020.

==== Polygamy and immigration ====
Accordingly, the U.S. government does not recognize bigamous marriages for immigration purposes (that is, would not allow one of the spouses to petition for immigration benefits for the other), even if they are legal in the country where the bigamous marriage was celebrated. Any immigrant who is coming to the United States to practice polygamy is not eligible for permanent resident immigrant status.

== History ==
Scots-Irish settlers, and some Welsh emigrants, carried long-standing multiple partner traditions from Europe to the Americas. Utopian and communal groups which were established during the mid-19th century had varying marriage systems, including group marriage and polygyny. There is also some evidence for the existence of multiple marriage partners in the American South, particularly after the Civil War.

Polygamy has also been practiced, discreetly, by some Muslims who are living in America. Among American Muslims, a small minority of around 50,000 to 100,000 people are estimated to live in families with a husband maintaining an informal polygamous relationship. However, these polygamous marriages are not recognized by American law.

Because polygamy has been illegal throughout the United States since the mid-19th century, and because it was illegal in many individual states before that period of time, sources on alternative marriage practices are limited. Consequently, it is difficult to get a clear picture of the extent of the practice both in the past and the present.

=== Early Latter Day Saint practice ===
The Mormon practice of plural marriage was officially introduced by Joseph Smith, the founder of the Latter Day Saint movement, on July 12, 1843. Because polygamy was illegal in the state of Illinois, it was practiced in secret during Smith's lifetime. During the 1839–1844 Nauvoo era, while several Mormon leaders (including Smith, Brigham Young and Heber C. Kimball) took plural wives, any Mormon leaders who publicly taught the polygamous doctrine were disciplined. For example, Hyram Brown was excommunicated on February 1, 1844. In May 1844 Smith declared, "What a thing it is for a man to be accused of committing adultery, and having seven wives, when I can only find one."

After the death of Joseph Smith, the practice of polygamy continued to exist in the Church of Jesus Christ of Latter-day Saints (LDS Church), which was then led by Brigham Young. In the territory that became Utah, and some surrounding areas, plural marriage was openly practiced by LDS Church adherents. In 1852, Young felt the LDS Church in Utah was secure enough to publicly announce their practice of polygamy. However opposition from the U.S. government threatened the legal standing of the LDS Church. President Wilford Woodruff announced the LDS Church's official abandonment of the practice on September 25, 1890. Woodruff's declaration was formally accepted in an LDS Church general conference on October 6, 1890. The LDS Church's position on the practice of polygamy was reinforced by another formal statement in 1904 called the Second Manifesto, which again renounced polygamy.

Although the Second Manifesto ended the official practice of new plural marriages, existing plural marriages were not automatically dissolved. Many Mormons, including prominent LDS Church leaders, maintained existing plural marriages well into the 20th century. A small percentage of adherents rejected the change, identifying as Mormon fundamentalists and leaving the mainstream LDS Church to continue practicing plural marriage.

=== Mormon fundamentalism ===
Some sects that practice or at least sanction polygamy are the Fundamentalist Church of Jesus Christ of Latter-Day Saints (FLDS), the Latter-day Church of Christ and the Apostolic United Brethren. Polygamy among these groups persists today in Utah, Arizona, Colorado, Canada, and some neighboring states, as well as up to 15,000 isolated individuals with no organized church affiliation. Polygamist churches of Latter Day Saint origin are often referred to as "Mormon fundamentalist"; however, the main LDS Church has rejected polygamy since the early 20th century. Mormon fundamentalists often use an ambiguous September 27, 1886 revelation to John Taylor as the basis for continuing the practice of plural marriage.

The Salt Lake Tribune estimates there may be as many as 37,000 Mormon fundamentalists, with less than half living in polygamous households. Most polygamous groups are composed of about a dozen extended Mormon fundamentalist organizations. The LDS Church asserts it is improper to call any of these splinter polygamous groups "Mormon."

== Current polygamist groups ==
Members of the Fundamentalist Church of Jesus Christ of Latter-Day Saints (FLDS) practice polygamy in arranged marriages that often, but not always, place young girls with older men. Most FLDS members live in Hildale, Utah, and Colorado City, Arizona, about 350 miles southwest of Salt Lake City, with other communities in Canada, Texas, North Dakota, and other areas of the North American west.

In 1998, about 40,000 people living in Utah were part of a polygamist family, or about 1.4 percent of the population. Polygamists have been difficult to prosecute because many only seek marriage licenses for their first marriage, while the other marriages are secretly conducted in private ceremonies. Thereafter, secondary wives attempt to be seen in public as single women with children.

Mormon fundamentalist sects tend to aggregate in individual communities of their own specific sect and basis for polygamy. These small groups range from a few hundred up to 10,000, and are located across Western North America, including:

- Bountiful, British Columbia
- Pringle, South Dakota
- Ozumba, State of Mexico
- Centennial Park, Arizona
- Colorado City, Arizona
- Bonners Ferry, Idaho
- Lovell, Wyoming
- Pinesdale, Montana
- Mancos, Colorado
- Davis County, Utah
- Salt Lake County, Utah
- Tooele County, Utah
- Utah County, Utah
- Motaqua, Utah
- Cedar City, Utah
- Hanna, Utah
- Hildale, Utah
- Manti, Utah
- Rocky Ridge, Utah
- Sanpete Valley, Utah
- Modena, Utah
- Eldorado, Texas
- Preston, Nevada
- Lund, Nevada

== Recent cases ==
The practice of informal polygamy among fundamentalist groups presents several legal issues. It has been considered difficult to prosecute polygamists for bigamy, in large part because they are rarely formally married under state laws. Without evidence that suspected offenders have multiple formal or common-law marriages, these groups are merely subject to the laws against adultery or unlawful cohabitation – laws which are not commonly enforced because they also criminalize other behavior that is otherwise socially sanctioned. However, some "Fundamentalist" polygamists marry girls prior to the age of consent, or commit fraud to obtain welfare and other public assistance.

In 1953, the state of Arizona investigated and raided a group of 385 people in the polygamist-practicing colony of Hildale and Colorado City, straddling the Utah-Arizona border. All the men were arrested and the children were placed with foster families. A judge eventually ruled this action illegal, and everyone returned to the community, which now contains about 10,000 people.

In 2001, in the state of Utah in the United States, Juab County Attorney David O. Leavitt successfully prosecuted Thomas Green, who was convicted of criminal non-support and four counts of bigamy for having five serially monogamous marriages, while living with previous legally divorced wives. His cohabitation was considered evidence of a common-law marriage to the wives he had divorced while still living with them. That premise was subsequently affirmed by the Utah Supreme Court in State v. Green, as applicable only in the State of Utah. Green was also convicted of child rape and criminal non-support.

In 2005, the state attorneys-general of Utah and Arizona issued a primer on helping victims of domestic violence and child abuse in polygamous communities. It was subsequently updated four times, the latest in 2011. Enforcement of crimes such as child abuse, domestic violence, and fraud were emphasized over the enforcement of anti-polygamy and bigamy laws. The priorities of local prosecutors are not covered by this statement.

In 2008, starting on April 4, Texas State officials took 436 women and children into temporary legal custody after Rozita Swinton, a 33-year-old woman living in Colorado Springs, Colorado, called both Texas Social Services and a local shelter claiming to be a 16-year-old girl. She made a series of phone calls to authorities in late March, claiming she had been beaten and forced to become a "spiritual" wife to an adult man. Acting on her calls, authorities raided the ranch in Eldorado, about 40 miles south of San Angelo. The YFZ Ranch is owned by the Fundamentalist Church of Jesus Christ of Latter Day Saints (FLDS), a Mormon offshoot that practices polygamy. Two men were arrested for obstructing the raid but were later released. Several men were found guilty and convicted of sexual assault, rape, and bigamy involving underage girls.

The stars of the TLC show Sister Wives challenged the state of Utah's bigamy laws, though also acknowledging that the state's constitutional ban of plural marriage licenses would remain regardless of the lawsuit's outcome. On December 13, 2013, US Federal Judge Clark Waddoups ruled in Brown v. Buhman that the portions of Utah's anti-polygamy laws which prohibit multiple cohabitation were unconstitutional, but also allowed Utah to maintain its ban on multiple marriage licenses. Unlawful cohabitation, where prosecutors did not need to prove that a marriage ceremony had taken place (only that a couple had lived together), had been a major tool used to prosecute polygamy in Utah since the 1882 Edmunds Act. The United States Court of Appeals for the Tenth Circuit reversed the decision on April 11, 2016 On January 23, 2017, the Supreme Court of the United States declined to hear arguments from the husband and four wives who star in the television show Sister Wives, letting stand a lower court ruling that kept polygamy a crime in Utah.

Views on polygamy in the United States

== Public opinion ==
In the United States, 23% of people believe that polygamy is morally acceptable, according to a 2022 Gallup poll; this is an increase from 7% in 2003.

== See also ==
- Alamo Christian Foundation
- Big Love
- Darger family
- David Koresh
- Legal status of polygamy
- List of polygamy court cases
- Oneida Community
- Polygamy in Christianity
- Polygyny in Islam
- Sister Wives
- Sons of Perdition (film)
