= The Church of Jesus Christ of Latter-day Saints and the Kingdom of God =

Fundamentalist church in the Latter-day Saint movement

The Church of Jesus Christ of Latter-day Saints and the Kingdom of God is a Mormon fundamentalist church which is not affiliated with the Church of Jesus Christ of Latter-day Saints. The sect was founded by Frank Naylor and Ivan Nielsen, who split from the Centennial Park group, another fundamentalist church over issues with another prominent polygamous family. The church is estimated to have 200–300 members, most of whom reside in the Salt Lake Valley. The group is also known as the Nielsen Naylor Group.

The church holds weekly meetings alternating between Malad, Idaho and the Church-house in Bluffdale, Utah.

== Polygamist roots ==
The Church of Jesus Christ of Latter-day Saints and the Kingdom of God's claims of authority are based around the accounts of John Wickersham Woolley, Lorin Calvin Woolley, and others of a meeting in September 1886 between LDS Church President John Taylor, the Woolleys, and others. Prior to the meeting, Taylor is said to have met with Jesus Christ and the deceased church founder Joseph Smith, and to have received a revelation commanding that plural marriage should not cease, but be kept alive by a group separate from the LDS Church. The following day, the Woolleys, as well as Taylor's counselor George Q. Cannon, and others, were said to have been set apart to keep "the principle" alive.

== Split from the Centennial Park group ==
The Centennial Park group is a polygamist sect based in the Arizona Strip. This group is itself a split from the Fundamentalist Church of Jesus Christ of Latter-Day Saints (FLDS Church). The Centennial Park group refers to itself as the "Second Ward" and refers to the FLDS Church as the "First Ward". When Alma A. Timpson became leader of the Second Ward in 1988, he appointed Frank Naylor as apostle and Ivan Nielsen as high priest and later as bishop. Naylor and Nielsen disagreed with Timpson's leadership and they split from the Second Ward in 1990 with Naylor as leader.

Much of the rivalry was based between interactions between Timpson's sons and Neilsen and Naylor's families.

== The new church ==
Naylor and Nielsen were able to gather a number of followers from both the Centennial Park group and the FLDS Church. Most of the members of the new group migrated north to the Salt Lake Valley in Utah where they have built a meeting house. They continue to practice polygamy as well as other fundamentalist doctrines such as the Adam–God doctrine. The church has also formed a close relationship with the Church of Jesus Christ (Original Doctrine) Inc., an FLDS Church-offshoot based in Bountiful, British Columbia.

== Endowment house ==
In 2008, they began offering an Endowment ritual. After careful consideration among the presidency, one of the homes owned by their leaders was renovated for use in giving Endowments.

== See also ==
- Factional breakdown: Mormon fundamentalist sects
- List of fundamentalist sects in the Latter Day Saint movement
- Big Love HBO series about a fictional independent polygamous Mormon fundamentalist family
