= Escape (Jessop and Palmer book) =

2007 autobiography centered around upbringing in the FLDS polygamous cult

- Author: Carolyn Jessop, Laura Palmer
- Cover artist: Elmer Hader
- Language: English
- Subject: Autobiography
- Publisher: Broadway Books
- Publication date: October 16, 2007
- Publication place: United States
- Media type: Print (hardcover)
- ISBN: 0-7679-2756-7
- OCLC: 153581188

Escape is a book by Carolyn Jessop and Laura Palmer. It discusses Jessop's upbringing in the Fundamentalist Church of Jesus Christ of Latter-Day Saints (FLDS) polygamous community. Her childhood was affected by the sect's suspicion of outsiders, the division that took place in that FLDS in the 1970s and '80s and by the increasing strictness of the sect her family belonged to. She experienced life with a mother who suffered from depression and was violent with her children. She observed conflict between her parents over celebrating Christmas and the effect of her surroundings and the strictness of the sect on her mother's mental condition and on her mother's relationship with her husband. She learned how to work around her mother's mood swings and observed how other children responded to spanking, so as to mitigate some of the violence. She also learned from her grandmother to take great pride in her church's tradition of plural marriage.

Carolyn wanted to go to college and study medicine, but when her father went to seek permission for her to go to college, the condition was that she marry Merril Jessop. It was arranged that she marry Jessop in two days, and to prevent her running away, she had to sleep in her parents' bedroom. She wrote, "The idea of sexual or physical contact with a man thirty-two years my senior was terrifying". Merril Jessop already had three other wives.

The book portrays Jessop's experience of a loveless and dysfunctional plural marriage, her eight pregnancies, four of which were life-threatening, and the last of which very nearly killed her. It describes her thwarted ambitions, her growing disillusionment with her husband, her conflict with Merril Jessop's older daughters, and the actions of the other wives. It also reveals step by step, how she came to reject the beliefs of the sect. When she decided that her only option was to escape, the book describes her meticulous planning and her willingness to seize the moment. The book also reveals the determination of the sect to control and suppress dissent in its ranks.

After Carolyn Jessop escaped with her eight children, the book describes her challenges in evading sect members who went looking for her and the children, how she won legal custody of her children, how she coped with post-traumatic stress and how she helped the children to adapt to life in the wider community. This was complicated by the fact that her eldest daughter, who was her father's favorite, was opposed to what her mother had done and was determined to return to the community. Her eldest son was also torn between loyalty to his mother and father. Jessop used her eldest son as bait to serve court papers on his father. Despite this, she was able to preserve her relationship with her son and he decided to become a pilot and break his ties with the sect. With the younger children she systematically weaned them away from the beliefs of the sect and into a more mainstream way of life.

The book reveals how others rallied round and helped Carolyn, and how the sect did its best to get her and the children back.

The book is published by Random House under the Doubleday/Broadway Books imprint and is also available in an audio format.

== See also ==
- Dorothy Allred Solomon
- Flora Jessop
- Stolen Innocence
