= Marriage in Canada =

The Parliament of Canada has exclusive legislative authority over marriage and divorce in Canada under section 91(26) of the Constitution Act, 1867. However, section 92(12) of the Constitution Act, 1867 gives the provincial legislatures the power to pass laws regulating the solemnization of marriage.

The marriage rate in Canada has been declining over the years. In 2001, there were 146,618 marriages in Canada, down 6.8% from 157,395 in 2000, but by 2020, there were only 98,355 marriages registered in Canada, which was the lowest total since 1938. Prince Edward Island had the highest crude marriage rate (6.5 per 1,000 people) and Quebec had the lowest (3.0).

Marriage ceremonies in Canada can be either civil or religious. Marriages may be performed by members of the clergy, marriage commissioners, judges, justices of the peace or clerks of the court, depending on the laws of each province and territory regulating marriage solemnization. In 2001, the majority of Canadian marriages (76.4%) were religious, with the remainder (23.6%) being performed by non-clergy.

Same-sex marriage has been legal in Canada nationally since 2005. Court decisions, starting in 2003, had already legalized same-sex marriage in eight out of ten provinces and one of three territories.

== Restrictions ==
=== Consanguinity ===
The federal Marriage (Prohibited Degrees) Act, Section 2 prevents the following persons from getting married:

1. Subject to subsection (2), persons related by consanguinity, affinity or adoption are not prohibited from marrying each other by reason only of their relationship.
2. No person shall marry another person if they are related lineally, or as brother or sister or half-brother or half-sister, including by adoption.

=== Consent of spouses ===
Both parties must freely consent. Forcing somebody to get married is a criminal offence under s. 293.1 of the Criminal Code. In addition, s. 2.1 of the Civil Marriage Act stipulates, "Marriage requires the free and enlightened consent of two persons to be the spouse of each other."

=== Age of spouses ===
Since 2015, federal law has set the absolute minimum marriageable age at 16. Provinces and territories may set a minimum age higher than that. In Canada the age of majority is set by province/territory at 18 or 19, so persons under this age have additional restrictions (i.e. parental and court consent). Section 293.2 of the Criminal Code also addresses marriages of individuals under the age of 16, reading: Everyone who celebrates, aids or participates in a marriage rite or ceremony knowing that one of the persons being married is under the age of 16 years is guilty of an indictable offence and liable to imprisonment for a term not exceeding five years. Section 2.2 of the Civil Marriage Act also states: No person who is under the age of 16 years may contract marriage. These provisions were enacted in 2015. Before 2015, it was possible for children less than 16 years old to get married in some jurisdictions of Canada, with parental consent or a court order. (The legal marriage age with parental consent was possibly as low as 7 in some Canadian jurisdictions.)

==== Minimum age by province and territory ====
- British Columbia: 19, or 16 with parental consent.
- Alberta: 18, or 16 with consent of all parents and legal guardians.
- Saskatchewan: 18, or 16 with a "Consent to Marriage of a Minor" form signed and completed by the parent(s) or guardian(s) in the presence of a Saskatchewan marriage licence issuer, clergy or any person authorized to take affidavits. "If the parent(s) or guardian(s) refuse to consent to the marriage, the minor can apply to a judge of either the provincial or Queen's Bench court for an order dispensing with their consent. The minor may obtain the judge's order by applying to a court house in Saskatchewan."
- Manitoba: 18, or 16 (with judicial consent).
- Ontario: 18, or 16 with written consent from both sets of parents.
- Quebec: 18, or 16 with authorization from the courts.
- New Brunswick: 18, or 16 with an affidavit of consent signed by parents or guardians.
- Nova Scotia: 19, or 16 with a signed consent form.
- Prince Edward Island: 18, or 16 with a consent form signed by parent(s).
- Newfoundland and Labrador: 19, or younger wherein "special consents may be required."
- Yukon: 19, or younger with consent of parent(s) or legal guardian(s).
- Northwest Territories: 19, or younger with parental consent.
- Nunavut: 19, or 16 with parental consent.

== Divorce ==
Divorce rates in Canada per 100,000 (Note: Divorce rates are per 100,000 residents in Canada)
Year	Rate
1950	39.3
1951	37.6
1952	39.1
1953	41.5
1954	38.7
1955	38.6
1956	37.3
1957	40.3
1958	36.8
1959	37.4
1960	39.1
1961	36.0
1962	36.4
1963	40.6
1964	44.7
1965	45.7
1966	51.2
1967	54.8
1968	54.8
1969	124.2
1970	139.8
1971	135.2
1972	145.8
1973	163.2
1974	197.4
1975	218.7
1976	231.2
1977	233.4
1978	238.5
1979	245.7
1980	253.0
1981	272.6
1982	280.4
1983	270.3
1984	254.5
1985	239.8
1986	300.0
1987	363.8
1988	311.7
1989	296.9
1990	283.4
1991	274.7
1992	278.6
1993	272.7
1994	272.0
1995	264.9
1996	241.6
1997	225.4
1998	229.1
1999	233.2
2000	231.8
2001	229.2
2002	223.8
2003	223.9
2004	218.0
2005	221.0
2006	229.3
2007	222.2
2008	210.8
2009	206.9
2010	204.9
2011	199.6
2012	197.4
2013	187.6
2014	177.0
2015	170.8
2016	172.8
2017	170.4
2018	165.5
2019	151.4
2020	112.9

Termination of marriage in Canada is covered by the federal Divorce Act.

A divorce may be granted for one of the following reasons:

- the marriage has irretrievably broken down, and the two parties have been living apart for a year (s.8(2)(a) of the Act)
- one party has committed adultery (s.8(2)(b)(i) of the Act)
- one party has treated the other party "with physical or mental cruelty of such a kind as to render intolerable the continued cohabitation of the spouses" (s.8(2)(b)(ii) of the Act)

Key headings of the Divorce Act:

- Interpretation
- Jurisdiction
- Divorce
- Child support orders
- Spousal support orders
- Priority
- Custody orders
- Variation, rescission or suspension of orders
- Provisional orders
- Appeals
- General

=== Divorce rates by year ===
This chart, with data from Statistics Canada, shows the amount of divorces per 100,000 residents of Canada from 1950 to 2020.

View source data.

=== Divorce rates in Canada by year of marriage ===
This chart, with data from Statistics Canada, shows the amount of marriages from 1955 to 2004 that ultimately ended in divorce. The data was collected in 2004.

View source data.

== Polygamy ==
In Canada, polygamy is a criminal offence, but prosecutions are rare. In March 2014, Winston Blackmore and James Oler were charged with polygamy; their prosecutions were the first such cases in Canada in over sixty-five years. In 2007, an independent prosecutor in British Columbia recommended that Canadian courts be asked to rule on the constitutionality of laws against polygamy. The Supreme Court of British Columbia upheld Canada's polygamy laws in a 2011 reference case.

On March 9, 2018, the Supreme Court of British Columbia reaffirmed the constitutionality of Canada's anti-polygamy laws, upholding the July 2017 polygamy convictions of Winston Blackmore and James Oler.

== See also ==
- Concubinage in Canada
