= Frank Naylor =

Frank Naylor may refer to:

- Frank Naylor, founder of The Church of Jesus Christ of Latter-day Saints and the Kingdom of God
- Frank Naylor (American football) (born 1959), player in the United States Football League
