= Ruby Jessop =

American former Mormon fundamentalist

- Born: May 3, 1986 (age 39)
- Known for: 2013 escape from FLDS
- Relatives: Flora Jessop; Carolyn Jessop; John Horne Blackmore; Winston Blackmore

Ruby Jessop (born May 3, 1986) is an American former member of the Fundamentalist Church of Jesus Christ of Latter Day Saints (FLDS) and child bride known for her family connections, her 2013 escape from an FLDS-controlled polygamous community, and the criminal probe prompted by her escape.

Ruby is the sister of author and ex-FLDS member Flora Jessop. In Flora's book, Church of Lies, she recounts how 14-year-old Ruby called her asking to help her escape after learning that she was to be married off to her second cousin and stepbrother, Haven Barlow. Flora writes that while the authorities were contacted, they were unable to locate Ruby, who was being moved from place to place to avoid contact with Flora.

FLDS Prophet Warren Jeffs officiated at the wedding of 14-year-old Ruby and Barlow, who was then in his mid-20s. When the two were married, this made Barlow her brother-in-law, second cousin, stepbrother, and husband. The intermarrying of Fundamentalist Mormon members is very common, as families have many members and only people inside the faith are deemed marriageable. This can result in inbreeding and can cause genetic defects.

After Ruby's escape, a press conference was held by Arizona Attorney General Tom Horne with Ruby and her sister Flora to announce not only the escape, but also a probe into the alleged FLDS practice of holding women against their will and an investigation of the police force in Colorado City.

Ruby has appeared on Katie Couric, Oprah, Anderson Cooper: 360°, Keep Sweet: Pray and Obey, and appears in Jon Krakauer's non-fiction book Under the Banner of Heaven: A Story of Violent Faith.

Ruby is cousin-by-marriage of Carolyn Jessop, author of the New York Times Best Seller Escape and ex-FLDS member. She is a relative of Winston Blackmore, the leader of a Canadian polygamous group, and also his uncle John Horne Blackmore, first leader of what became the Social Credit Party of Canada.
