= Marriageable age =

Age where marriage is allowed by law

Marriageable age is the minimum legal age of marriage. Age and other prerequisites to marriage vary between jurisdictions, but in the vast majority of jurisdictions, the marriageable age as a right is set at the age of majority. Nevertheless, most jurisdictions allow marriage at a younger age with parental or judicial approval, especially if the female is pregnant. In industrialized cultures, the age of marriage is most commonly 18 years old, but there are variations, and the marriageable age should not be confused with the age of majority or the age of consent, though they may be the same.

The 55 parties to the 1962 Convention on Consent to Marriage, Minimum Age for Marriage, and Registration of Marriages have agreed to specify a minimum marriageable age by statute law‚ to override customary, religious, and tribal laws and traditions. When the marriageable age under a law of a religious community is lower than that under the law of the land, the state law prevails. However, some religious communities do not accept the supremacy of state law in this respect, which may lead to child marriage or forced marriage.

The 123 parties to the 1956 Supplementary Convention on the Abolition of Slavery have agreed to adopt a prescribed "suitable" minimum age for marriage. In many developing countries, the official age prescriptions stand as mere guidelines. UNICEF, the United Nations children's organization, regards a marriage of a minor (legal child), a person below the adult age, as child marriage and a violation of rights.

Until recently, the minimum marriageable age for females was lower in many jurisdictions than for males, on the premise that females mature at an earlier age than males. This law has been viewed by some to be discriminatory, so that in many countries the marriageable age of females has been raised to equal that of males.

== History and social attitudes ==
=== Classical antiquity ===
==== Greece ====
In Greece females married as young as 14 or 16. In Spartan marriages, females were around 18 and males were around 25.

==== Rome ====
In the Roman Empire, the Emperor Augustus introduced marriage legislation, the Lex Papia Poppaea, which rewarded marriage and childbearing. The legislation also imposed penalties for both men and women who remained unmarried, or who married but for whatever reason failed to have children. For men it was between the ages of 25 and 60 while for women it was between ages 20 and 50. Girls who were Vestal Virgins were selected between the ages of 10 and 13 to serve as priestesses in the temple of goddess Vesta in the Roman Forum for 30 years, after which they could marry.

In Roman law the age of marriage was 12 years for females and 14 years for males, and age of betrothal was 7 years for both males and females. The father had the right and duty to seek a good and useful match for his children. To further the interests of their birth families, daughters of the elite would marry into respectable families. If a daughter could prove the proposed husband to be of bad character, she could legitimately refuse the match. Individuals remained under the authority of the pater familias until his death, and the latter had the power to approve or reject marriages for his sons and daughters, but by the late antique period, Roman law permitted women over 25 to marry without parental consent.

Noblewomen were known to marry as young as 12 years of age, whereas women in the lower social classes were more likely to marry slightly further into their teenage years. 43% of Pagan females married at 12–15 years and 42% of Christian females married at 15–18 years.

In late antiquity, most Roman women married in their late teens to early twenties, but noble women married younger than those of the lower classes, as an aristocratic girl was expected to be virgin until her first marriage. In late antiquity, under Roman law, daughters inherited equally from their parents if no will was produced. In addition, Roman law recognized wives' property as legally separate from husbands' property, as did some legal systems in parts of Europe and colonial Latin America.

In 380 C.E., the Emperor Theodosius issued the Edict of Thessalonica, which made Nicene Christianity the official religion of the Roman Empire. The Holy See adapted Roman law into Canon law.

=== Medieval Europe ===
After the fall of the Western Roman Empire and the rise of the Holy Roman Empire, manorialism also helped weaken the ties of kinship and thus the power of clans. As early as the 9th century in northwestern France, families that worked on manors were small, consisting of parents and children and occasionally a grandparent. The Roman Catholic Church and State had become allies in erasing the solidarity and thus the political power of the clans; the Roman Catholic Church sought to replace traditional religion, whose vehicle was the kin group, and substitute the authority of the elders of the kin group with that of a religious elder. At the same time, the king's rule was undermined by revolts by the most powerful kin groups, clans or sections, whose conspiracies and murders threatened the power of the state and also the demands by manorial Lords for obedient, compliant workers.

As the peasants and serfs lived and worked on farms that they rented from the lord of the manor, they also needed the permission of the lord to marry. Couples therefore had to comply with the lord of the manor and wait until a small farm became available before they could marry and thus produce children. Those who could and did not delay marriage were presumably rewarded by the landlord and those who did not marry were presumably denied that reward. For example, marriageable ages in Medieval England varied depending on economic circumstances, with couples delaying marriage until their early twenties when times were bad, but might marry in their late teens after the Black Death, when there was a severe labour shortage; by appearances, marriage of adolescents was not the norm in England.

In medieval Western Europe, the rise of Catholicism and manorialism had both created incentives to keep families nuclear, and thus the age of marriage increased; the Western Church instituted marriage laws and practices that undermined large kinship groups. The Roman Catholic Church prohibited consanguineous marriages, a marriage pattern that had been a means to maintain clans (and thus their power) throughout history. The Roman Catholic Church curtailed arranged marriages in which the bride did not clearly agree to the union.

In the 12th century, the Roman Catholic Church drastically changed legal standards for marital consent by allowing daughters over 12 years old and sons over 14 years old to marry without their parents' approval, which was previously required, even if their marriage was made clandestinely. Parish studies have confirmed that in the late medieval period, females did sometimes marry without their parents' approval in England.

In the 12th century, Canon law jurist Gratian, stated that consent for marriage could not take place before the age of 12 years old for females and 14 years old for males; also, consent for betrothal could not take place before the age of 7 years old for females and males, as that is the age of reason. The Church of England, after breaking away from the Roman Catholic Church, carried with it the same minimum age requirements. Age of consent for marriage of 12 years old for girls and of 14 years old for boys were written into English civil law.

The first recorded age-of-consent law, in England, dates back 800 years. The age of consent law in question has to do with the law of rape and not the law of marriage as sometimes misunderstood. In 1275, in England, as part of the rape law, the Statute of Westminster 1275, made it a misdemeanor to have sex with a "maiden within age", whether with or without her consent. The phrase "within age" was interpreted by jurist Sir Edward Coke as meaning the age of marriage, which at the time was 12 years old. A 1576 law was created with more severe punishments for having sex with a girl for which the age of consent was set at 10 years old. Under English common law the age of consent, as part of the law of rape, was 10 or 12 years old and rape was defined as forceful sexual intercourse with a woman against her will. To convict a man of rape, both force and lack of consent had to be proved, except in the case of a girl who is under the age of consent. Since the age of consent applied in all circumstances, not just in physical assaults, the law also made it impossible for an underage girl (under 12 years old) to consent to sexual activity. There was one exception: a man's acts with his wife (females over 12 years old), to which rape law did not apply. Jurist Sir Matthew Hale stated that both rape laws were valid at the same time. In 1875, the Offence Against the Persons Act raised the age to 13 years in England; an act of sexual intercourse with a girl younger than 13 was a felony.

There were some fathers who arranged marriages for a son or a daughter before he or she reached the age of maturity, which is similar to what some fathers in ancient Rome did. Consummation would not take place until the age of maturity. Roman Catholic Canon law defines a marriage as consummated when the "spouses have performed between themselves in a human fashion a conjugal act which is suitable in itself for the procreation of offspring, to which marriage is ordered by its nature and by which the spouses become one flesh." There are recorded marriages of two- and three-year-olds: in 1564, a three-year-old named John was married to a two-year-old named Jane in the Bishop's Court in Chester, England.

=== Modern history ===
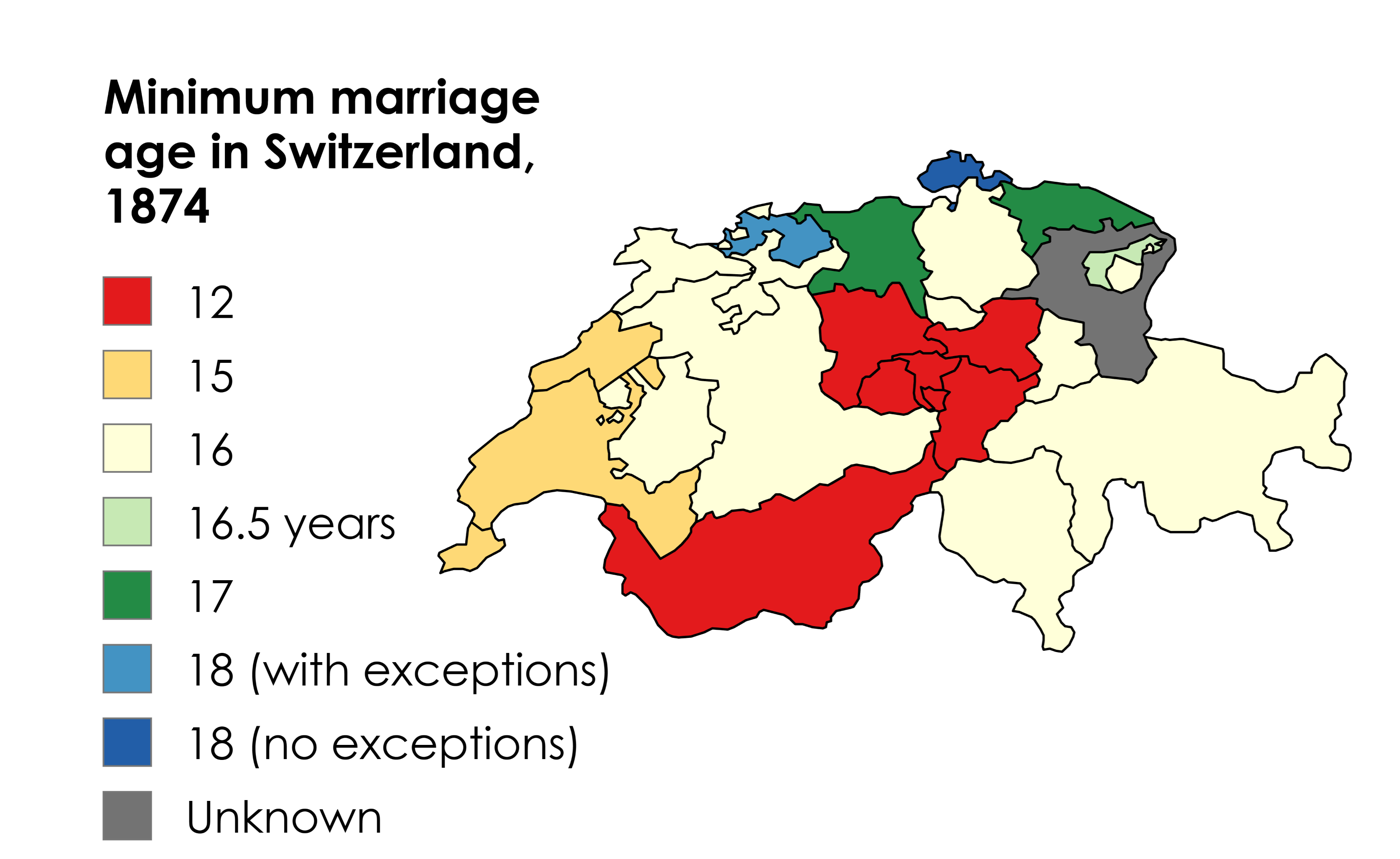
Map of female marriageable age in Switzerland in 1874

The policy of the Roman Catholic Church, and later various Protestant churches, of considering clandestine marriages and marriages made without parental consent to be valid was controversial, and in the 16th century both the French monarchy and the Lutheran Church sought to end these practices, with limited success.

In most of Northwestern Europe, marriages at very early ages were rare. One thousand marriage certificates from 1619 to 1660 in the Archdiocese of Canterbury show that only one bride was 13 years old, four were 15, twelve were 16, and seventeen were 17 years old; while the other 966 brides were at least 19 years old.

In England and Wales, the Marriage Act 1753 required a marriage to be covered by a licence (requiring parental consent for those under 21) or the publication of bans (which parents of those under 21 could forbid). Additionally, the Church of England dictated that both the bride and groom must be at least 21 years of age to marry without the consent of their families. In the certificates, the most common age for the brides is 22 years. For the grooms 24 years was the most common age, with average ages of 24 years for the brides and 27 for the grooms. While European noblewomen often married early, they were a small minority of the population, and the marriage certificates from Canterbury show that even among nobility it was very rare to marry women off at very early ages.

The minimum age requirements of 12 and 14 were eventually written into English civil law. By default, these provisions became the minimum marriageable ages in colonial America. On the average, marriages occurred several years earlier in colonial America than in Europe, and much higher proportions of the population eventually got married. Community-based studies suggest an average age at marriage of about 20 years old for women in the early colonial period and about 26 years old for men. In the late 19th century and throughout the 20th century, U.S. states began to slowly raise the minimum legal age at which individuals were allowed to marry. Age restrictions, as in most developed countries, have been revised upward so that they are now between 15 and 21 years of age.

Before 1929, the Scottish law adopted the Roman law in allowing a girl to marry at twelve years of age and a boy at fourteen, without any requirement for parental consent. However, in practice, marriages in Scotland at such young ages was almost unknown.

=== Netherlands ===
The highest average age at first marriage was in the Netherlands: on average 27 years for women and 30 years for men in both the rural and urban population from the late 1400's onward till the end of WWII, rising at times to 30 years for women and 32 years for men. On average 25-30% of people in the Netherlands remained unmarried throughout their life between 1500 and 1950. In Amsterdam the mean age at first marriage for women fluctuated between 23.5 and 25 years old from the late 15th century until the 1660s, when it started to rise even further.

From early on the Roman Catholic Church promoted sexual abstinence over marriage, but marriage over sexual promiscuity. This meant that remaining unmarried became socially acceptable in Western Europe. In the Middle Ages marriage was often not recorded and therefore could depend on the word of the couple that could either confirm or deny it having taken place. A majority of unmarried women would be in the service of the church as nuns or as lay women. A vast number of women also provided for themselves in specialised professions until the financial freedoms of women were curtailed by the guilds in the late Middle Ages. This meant that until the late Middle Ages many women could also run businesses to sustain themselves outside of marriage.

After the 1400's the first marriage age became better recorded and seems to be influenced largely by the economic situation. In times of economical uncertainty both women and men tended to marry younger (between 20–25 years old for women) but the age gap was somewhat larger. A major factor was that by marrying their daughter off young the parents had one mouth less to feed and the dowry was often lower for younger girls who had learned less skills and build up less savings. This also explains the larger age gap between husband and wife in economical harsher times: an older husband would already have established himself an income to sustain a wife and thus children. Though for political reasons nobility often engaged and married far younger than the general population in many cases the actual consummation of the marriage was postponed until both marriage partners had reached a more mature age.

Another contributing factor to later marriage age is that in the Middle Ages a culture of nuclear family structures developed from the multiple generational extended family structures that were common in pre-Christian tribal societies in Western Europe. Both men and women would typically spend several years of working as a maid, farmhand, labourer or apprentice in order to gain work experience, develop skills and save up money to sustain their own nuclear family, rather than continuing to live in multigenerational household. This development raised the socially accepted first marriage age of women from puberty onset (12–14 years old) in the early Middle Ages up to their late teens and older by the late medieval period, and during the renaissance up to their middle twenties on average. This development also brought the first marriage age of women and men far closer together. The great general wealth in the Netherlands from the spice trade also meant that women married later in life. The highest marriage ages for both men and women was passed 30 years old and are found in times of national financial prosperity.

An other contributing reason was that late marriage age was a recognised method of birth control. The later a woman married the less children she would birth and the less children a couple had to raise. It was also generally recognised that giving birth at a very young age was detrimental for the woman's health and therefore socially disapproved of. Social disapproval of a young marriage age for the woman and a large age gap between the marriage partners can still be recognised in sayings originating in those centuries. A well known example from neighbouring Britain is the cautionary tale of the play Romeo and Juliet by William Shakespeare of whom the young ages were considered scandalous at the time.

=== France ===
In France, until the French Revolution, the marriageable age was 12 years for females and 14 for males. Revolutionary legislation in 1792 increased the age to 13 years for females and 15 for males. Under the Napoleonic Code in 1804, the marriageable age was set at 15 years old for females and 18 years old for males. In 2006, the marriageable age for females was increased to 18, the same as for males. In jurisdictions where the ages are not the same, the marriageable age for females is more commonly two or three years lower than that of males.

=== Poland ===
In 17th century Poland, in the Warsaw parish of St John, the average age of women entering marriage was 20.1, and that of men was 23.7. In the second half of the eighteenth century, women in the parish of Holy Cross married at 21.8, while men at 29.

=== Eastern Europe ===
In medieval Eastern Europe, the Slavic traditions of patrilocality of early and universal marriage (usually of a bride aged 13–15 years, with menarche occurring on average at age 14) lingered; the manorial system had yet to penetrate into Eastern Europe and generally had less effect on clan systems there. The bans on cross-cousin marriages had also not been firmly enforced.

In Russia, before 1830 the age of consent for marriage was 15 years old for males and 13 years old for females (though 15 years old was preferred for females, so much so that it was written into the Law Code of 1649). Teenage marriage was practised for chastity. Both the female and the male teenager needed consent of their parents to marry because they were under 20 years old, the age of majority. In 1830, the age of consent for marriage was raised to 18 years old for males and 16 years old for females Though 18 years old was preferred for females, the average age of marriage for females was around 19 years old.

=== Mesoamerica ===
==== Aztec society ====
Aztec family law generally followed customary law. Men got married between the ages of 20–22, and women generally got married at 15 to 18 years of age.

==== Mayan civilization ====
Maya family law appears to have been based on customary law. Maya men and women usually got married at around the age of 20, though women sometimes got married at the age of 16 or 17.

== Marriageable age as a right vs exceptions ==
In majority of countries, a right to marry at age 18 is enshrined along with all other rights and responsibilities of adulthood. However, most of these countries allow those younger than that age to marry, usually with parental consent or judicial authorization. These exceptions vary considerably by country. The United Nations Population Fund stated:

In 2010, 158 countries reported that 18 years was the minimum legal age for marriage for women without parental consent or approval by a pertinent authority. However, in 146 [of those] countries, state or customary law allows girls younger than 18 to marry with the consent of parents or other authorities; in 52 countries, girls under age 15 can marry with parental consent. In contrast, 18 is the legal age for marriage without consent among males in 180 countries. Additionally, in 105 countries, boys can marry with the consent of a parent or a pertinent authority, and in 23 countries, boys under age 15 can marry with parental consent.

In recent years, many countries in the EU have tightened their marriage laws, either banning marriage under 18 completely, or requiring judicial approval for such marriages. Countries which have reformed their marriage laws in recent years include Sweden (2014), Denmark (2017), Germany (2017), Luxembourg (2014), Spain (2015), Netherlands (2015), Finland (2019) and Ireland (2019). Many developing countries have also enacted similar laws in recent years: Honduras (2017), Ecuador (2015), Costa Rica (2017), Panama (2015), Trinidad & Tobago (2017), Malawi (2017).

The minimum age requirements of 12 years old for females and 14 years old for males were written into English civil law. By default, these provisions became the minimum marriageable ages in colonial America. This English common law inherited from the British remained in force in America unless a specific state law was enacted to replace them. In the United States, as in most developed countries, age restrictions have been revised upward so that they are now between 15 and 21 years of age.

In Western countries, marriages of teenagers have become rare in recent years, with their frequency declining during the past few decades. For instance, in Finland, where in the early 21st century underage youth could obtain a special judicial authorization to marry, there were only 30–40 such marriages per year during that period (with most of the spouses being aged 17), while in the early 1990s, more than 100 such marriages were registered each year. Since 1 June 2019 Finland has banned marriages of anyone under 18 with no exemptions.

== Relation to the age of majority ==
Marriageable age as a right is usually the same with the age of majority which is 18 years old in most countries. However, in some countries, the age of majority is under 18, while in others it is 19, 20 or 21 years. In Canada, for example, the age of majority is 19 in Nova Scotia, New Brunswick, British Columbia, Newfoundland and Labrador, the Northwest Territories, Yukon and Nunavut. Marriage under 19 years in these provinces requires parental or court consent (see Marriage in Canada). In the United States, for example, the age of majority is 21 in Mississippi and 19 in Nebraska and requires parental consent. In many jurisdictions of North America, married minors become legally emancipated.

== Listed by country ==
=== Maps ===
Minimum marriage age without parental consent by country; strip pattern indicates different ages for men and women

Minimum marriage age with parental consent (but without judicial approval) by country; strip pattern indicates different ages for men and women

Minimum marriage age with judicial approval by country; strip pattern indicates different ages for men and women

=== Africa ===
Country	Without parental or judicial consent		With parental consent		With judicial consent		Notes
Country	Male	Female	Male	Female	Male	Female	Notes
Algeria	19				None		(Article 7 of the Family Code)
Angola	18		16	15	–		
Benin	18				None		
Botswana	18				–		
Burkina Faso	18					16	
Burundi	21			18	–		
Cameroon	21		18	15	–		
Central African Republic	18						Family Code 1998 and the Code de Protection de l'enfant, 2020
Chad	18						
Democratic Republic of Congo	18						
Djibouti	18				None		
Egypt	18						
Equatorial Guinea	18				14		
Eritrea	18					16	Pregnant girls may be given permission to marry at 16.
Eswatini	21		18	16	–		
Ethiopia	18 (15 in Somali state)				16 (15 in Somali state)		In Somali region which has not yet domesticated the new Family law, the minimum age is still 15
Gabon	21		18		None		Law No. 006/2021, Article 203 of the Civil Code
Guinea	21		18		None		Marriage below 18 may be allowed by the President of Guinea by request of the Minister of Justice.
Guinea-Bissau	18		16				
Ivory Coast	18						Law No. 2019-570
Kenya	18						As per section 4, Marriage Act 2014.
Lesotho	21		18	16	–		
Liberia	21	18	18	16	–		
Libya	20 (eastern Libya); 18 (western Libya)	Not allowed	20 (eastern Libya); 18 (western Libya)		None		Muslim women require consent of male guardian (wali) at any age, but it can be overriden by a judge. Judge can authorize a marriage of a woman below 18 with no minimum age stipulated.
Mauritius	18						Civil Code 1990 and Children's Act 2020
Madagascar	18				None		
Mali	18	16	18	16	15		
Mauritania	18	Not allowed	None				Muslim women require consent of male guardian (wali) at any age, but this can be overriden by a judge. Guardian can permit a marriage of a minor, with no minimum age stipulated.
Morocco	18				None		
Mozambique	18						In July 2019, Mozambique passed a law to ban child marriage outright. It was signed by the President on 14 October 2019 and it became a law after being published in "Boletim da República" on 22 October.
Namibia	21		18		None		Under the age of 18 with the written permission of the Minister or any staff member in the Public Service authorized by the Minister.
Niger	21		18	15	–		
Nigeria	18 in most of Southern states, 16 in Kwara and Akwa Ibom states, puberty in northern Sharia states						
Republic of the Congo	21	18	21	18	None		
Rwanda	21						
São Tomé and Príncipe	18						Since 2018 marriage under 18 prohibited without exceptions.
Senegal	18			16	None		President of the regional court after investigation may allow marriage for a boy under 18 and girl under 16.
Sierra Leone	18						Prohibited without exceptions since 2024.
Somalia	18	Not allowed	No minimum				While 1975 Family Code provides minimum age of marriage at 18 for men and 16 for women, it has never been implemented or enforced. Muslim customary law applies.
South Africa	18			15	None		Under the Marriage Act, 1961, parental consent is required for the marriage of a party under the age of majority, which was formerly 21 but is now 18. The special consent of the Minister of Home Affairs is also required for the marriage of a girl under the age of 15 or a boy under the age of 18.; Under the Civil Union Act, 2006, which allows for same-sex or opposite-sex marriages, both parties must be 18 or older.; Under the Recognition of Customary Marriages Act, 1998, a customary marriage entered into after the passage of the act will only be recognised if both parties were 18 or older.
South Sudan	18						
Sudan	Puberty (Muslim religious marriages)				10		The Personal Status Law of Muslims, 1991, allows Muslim religious marriages from puberty. All other marriages include civil marriages between Muslims, civil marriages between non-Muslims, civil marriages between Muslim men and non-Muslim women, and non-Muslim religious marriages. All civil marriages require two (2) Muslim witnesses. Sudan forbids marriage between a Muslim woman and a non-Muslim man.
Sudan	18 (other marriages)	16 (other marriages)	18 (other marriages)	16 (other marriages)	10		The Personal Status Law of Muslims, 1991, allows Muslim religious marriages from puberty. All other marriages include civil marriages between Muslims, civil marriages between non-Muslims, civil marriages between Muslim men and non-Muslim women, and non-Muslim religious marriages. All civil marriages require two (2) Muslim witnesses. Sudan forbids marriage between a Muslim woman and a non-Muslim man.
Tanzania	18			15	14		
Togo	18				16		
Tunisia	18				None		Below 18 marriage allowed with parental and judicial consent in "extremely serious" cases.
Uganda	21		18				Civil marriage
Uganda	21		18	16	18	16	Customary marriage
Uganda	18	Not allowed	No minimum				Muslim marriage
Zambia	21		18				In 2023 marriages under 18 banned.
Zimbabwe	18						In 2016, the Constitutional Court ruled that the Marriage Act, which permitted girls (not boys) aged 16 to be married with their parents' consent, was unconstitutional and recognised 18 years as the legal minimum age of marriage.

=== Americas ===
Country	Without parental or judicial consent		With parental consent		With judicial consent		Notes
Country	Male	Female	Male	Female	Male	Female	Notes
Antigua and Barbuda	18						Section 25 of The Marriage Act, as amended by Section 3 of the Marriage (Amendment) Act, 2019, reads: "A marriage solemnized between persons either of whom is under the age of eighteen shall be null and void."
Argentina	18		16		None		(Art 403 and 404 of Código Civil y Comercial de la Nación).
Bahamas	18		15		13		The Marriage Act (1908) provides a minimum age of 13 with judicial consent; the age with parental consent is 15 (Marriage Act, Sec. 20(2), 50 and Schedule M).
Barbados	18		16		–		
Belize	18						Since 2024, the minimum age is 18.
Bolivia	18						Since 25 September 2025 18 with no exceptions. Before allowed for 16 year olds with parental consent.
Brazil	18		16				
Canada	18/19		16				Marriage in Canada is governed by both federal and provincial laws. The minimum age to marry is set at 16 by a federal statute, the Civil Marriage Act, which states: "No person who is under the age of 16 years may contract marriage." In addition, the provinces may impose procedural requirements for the marriage of a minor who is over 16 but under the age of majority (18 or 19), such as requiring parental consent or permission from a judge. The Criminal Code also prohibits marriage under the age of 16: "Everyone who celebrates, aids or participates in a marriage rite or ceremony knowing that one of the persons being married is under the age of 16 years is guilty of an indictable offence and liable to imprisonment for a term not exceeding five years."
Chile	18						Since 2022, the minimum age is 18.
Colombia	18						Before 2025 allowed at age of 14 with parental approval, now prohibited without exceptions.
Costa Rica	18						
Cuba	18						Since 2022, the minimum age is 18.
Dominica	18		16		–		
Dominican Republic	18						Since 2021, the minimum age is 18.
Ecuador	18						Since 2015, the minimum age is 18.
El Salvador	18						Since 2017, the minimum age is 18.
Grenada	18						
Guatemala	18						Since 2017 all under-18 marriage prohibited.
Guyana	18		16		–		
Haiti	18			15	–		
Honduras	18						Since 2017, the minimum age is 18. Before 2017 females could marry from 16, with parental consent.
Jamaica	18		16		–		
Mexico	18						Varies by state. The General Law on the Rights of Children and Adolescents 2014 establishes 18 years as the general age of marriage, but allows girls to marry at 14 and boys at 16 with parental consent. At state level, as of May 2017, 22 states have made marriage before 18 illegal, while another ten allow it under certain circumstances. As of June 1, 2020 marriageable age in all states is 18 without exceptions.
Nicaragua	18		16		–		Under the new 2014 Código de Familia, Articles 54, 57(a) and 58(c).
Panama	18						Since 2015, the minimum age is 18; prior to that date girls could marry from age 14 years and boys from age 16, with parental consent.
Paraguay	18		16		–		
Peru	18						Since 2023 all marriage under 18 prohibited, before marriage was allowed with parental consent for 14 year olds
Puerto Rico	21		18		None		(Younger parties may obtain license in case of pregnancy or birth of child), and 18 with parental consent. Puerto Rico is a territory of the United States.
Saint Kitts and Nevis	18						
Saint Lucia	18		16		–		
Saint Vincent and the Grenadines	18		–		–		
Suriname	21		18				Since 2025 the age is 21 without parental consent and 18 with.
Trinidad and Tobago	18						Since 2017, the minimum age is 18.
United States	18 in most states/territories 19 in Nebraska; 21 in Mississippi 21 in Puerto Rico		Varies by state				Main article: Age of marriage in the United States The minimum marriageable age requirements of 12 years old for females and 14 years old for males were written into English civil law. By default, these provisions became the minimum marriageable ages in colonial America. English common law inherited from the British remained in force in America unless a specific state law was enacted to replace them. In the United States, as in most developed countries, age restrictions have been revised upward so that they are now between 15 and 21 years of age. Minors under 18 cannot marry in the states of New York State, Pennsylvania, New Jersey, Delaware, Minnesota, Rhode Island, Connecticut, Massachusetts, Virginia, New Hampshire, Washington State, Michigan and Vermont under any circumstance. This also holds true for the territories of the U.S. Virgin Islands and American Samoa.
Uruguay	18				16		In 2025 the age of marriage was raised to 18 but from the age of 16 still possible with judicial consent.
Venezuela	18		16				Articles 18, 46, 59–65 of the Civil Code, decision of the Supreme Tribunal of Justice.

=== Asia ===
Country	Without parental or judicial consent		With parental consent		With judicial consent		Notes
Country	Male	Female	Male	Female	Male	Female	Notes
Afghanistan	18		18		16		
Armenia	18						The age was set at 18 for both sexes in 2012, prior to that date it was 17 for females and 18 for males. On June 7, 2024, the law on marriage exceptions was repealed. Previously, marriage at the age of 17 was permitted with the consent of the parents, and at the age of 16 - with the consent of the parents and provided that the other willing spouse had reached the age of at least 18 years.
Azerbaijan	18						The marriageable age for females was raised to 18 in 2011, equalizing it to that of males; prior to that date, it was set at 17 years. On June 11, 2024, the law on marriage exceptions was repealed. Previously, marriage at 17 years was permitted in special cases with judicial authorization according to Article 10 of the Family Code.
Bahrain	18	Not allowed	None	16	None		Muslim women require consent of male guardian (wali) at any age. Guardian can permit a marriage of a minor, with no minimum age stipulated.
Bangladesh	21	18	None				Bangladeshi law provides penal sanctions for the contraction of under-age marriages, although such unions are not considered invalid. Despite the law, child marriage rates in Bangladesh are among the highest in the world. Every 2 out of 3 marriages involve child marriages.
Bhutan	18						Since June 2025 18 with no exceptions, before girls could marry from 16.
Brunei	18	18	14 (Christian marriage)				
Brunei	18	Not allowed	None (Muslim marriage)				Muslim women require consent of male guardian (wali) at any age, but this can be overriden by a judge. No minimum age is stipulated.
Brunei	18	18	None	15	None	15	For Chinese marriages minimum age is 15 for women but no minimum is stipulated for men
Cambodia	18		16				
China	22	20	22	20	–		China is the only country to have the highest set marriageable age for men. The sign painted on a building in a village in Hubei, China, informs of the marriageable age in the country (22 for men, 20 for women).
Cyprus	18						Since 2023, marriage under 18 is prohibited.
East Timor	17		16		–		
Georgia	18						Since 2017, marriage under 18 is prohibited.
Hong Kong	21		16		–		
India	21	18	None				The Prohibition of Child Marriage Act, 2006 (PCMA) provides that the minimum age of marriage is 21 years in case of males, and 18 years in case of females. On 30 November 2022, The High court of Jharkhand reported that a Muslim Woman can marry a person of her choice after attaining 15 years. In 2025 the Supreme Court upheld validity of underage marriage of Muslims.
India	15 for Muslims		None				The Prohibition of Child Marriage Act, 2006 (PCMA) provides that the minimum age of marriage is 21 years in case of males, and 18 years in case of females. On 30 November 2022, The High court of Jharkhand reported that a Muslim Woman can marry a person of her choice after attaining 15 years. In 2025 the Supreme Court upheld validity of underage marriage of Muslims.
Indonesia	21		19		None		The 2019 revision of the Marriage Law (1974) raised the marriageable age for female from 16 to 19 years, put it equally to that of males. However, grooms and brides under the age of 21 are required to get their parents' permission before marriage. While parents can ask the court to grant permission in the case of the grooms or the brides under the age of 19, the revision stipulated that the court can grant such permission only if there are urgent reasons as well as supporting evidences to back them. The law revision also stresses that the court must consider the spirit of preventing child marriage, as well as moral, religious, cultural, psychological, and health considerations before granting the permission.
Iran	18	15	15	13	None		Ways around these regulations include temporary marriages (Nikah mut'ah). With the permission of a court girls may marry at a younger age. In 2010 as many as 42,000 children aged between 10 and 14 years were married, and 716 girls younger than 10 had wed.
Iraq	18				15		15 with judicial permission if fitness, physical capacity and guardian's consent (or unreasonable objection on part of guardian) are established. In January 2025, the Iraqi Council of Representatives passed a law amending the Personal Status Law; the age of marriage was not changed and its reduction is expressly prohibited in the amendment.
Israel	18				16		Minimum marriageable age increased from 17 to 18 years in November 2013. Family courts are able to recognise marriage for 16 years and above in special cases.
Japan	18						
Jordan	18	Not allowed	18		15		Muslim women require consent of male guardian (wali) at any age.
Kazakhstan	18		17		16		
Kuwait	18	Not allowed	18				Since 2025 all marriage under 18 prohibited, before that boys could marry from 17 and girls from 15 with parental permission. Muslim women require consent of male guardian (wali) at any age.
Kyrgyzstan	18				17		Local self-government agencies may, at the request of the parties entering the marriage, provided that justifiable reasons exist, lower the marriageable age. The marriageable age may not be lowered by more than 1 year.
Laos	18		15		–		
Macau	18		16				Articles 1478, 1479 and 1482 of the Civil Code.
Malaysia	21 (civil marriage)		18			16	
Malaysia	21 (Muslim marriage)	Not allowed	18	16	None		Muslim women require consent of male guardian (wali) at any age, but this can be overriden by a judge. Men under 18 and women under 16 can marry with judicial approval, no minimum age is stipulated.
Maldives	18						Since 2019 marriage under 18 prohibited without exceptions.
Mongolia	18				16		Under the Family Law 1999, Art. 9.1.2 the minimum legal age of marriage is 18 years. However, the next article allows persons between the ages of 16–18 to be married if they have been "commissioned the right of full legal capacity" in accordance to the Civil Code.
Myanmar	18						Since 2019 marriage under 18 prohibited.
Nepal	20		20		–		(Civil Code 2017, Section 70 and 71) Marriage may be concluded if both have attained twenty years of age. Notwithstanding anything contained in clause (b) of sub-section (1), nothing shall bar the conclusion, or causing the conclusion of, a marriage within the relationship that is allowed to marry in accordance with the practices prevailing in their ethnic community or clan.
North Korea	18	17	18	17	–		
Oman	18	Not allowed	18		None		Muslim women require consent of male guardian (wali) at any age. Guardian can permit a marriage of a minor, with no minimum age stipulated.
Pakistan	18	16/18, depending on the province. 18 in Punjab and Sindh.	18	16/18	–		Despite the law against child marriage, the practice is widespread. According to two 2013 reports, nearly 20% of all marriages in Pakistan involve girls less than 18 years old. However, in Punjab and Sindh, severe punishments are given for marriages before the age of 18.
Palestine	18	Not allowed	18		None		Since 2019 marriage below 18 years is allowed only with religious court permission. Regardless of age women require male guardian (wali) permission to marry
Philippines	21		18		–		
Qatar	18	Not allowed	18	16	None		Muslim women require consent of male guardian (wali) at any age. Guardian can permit a marriage of a minor, with no minimum age stipulated.
Saudi Arabia	18	Not allowed	18		15		Muslim women require consent of male guardian (wali) at any age, but this can be overriden by a judge.
Singapore	21		18		None		
South Korea	19		18				
Sri Lanka	18		12		None		However, the parties must have a Qadi's permission to marry before contracting into marriage if they are Muslims.
Syria	18				15		Consent of male guardian (wali) not required for woman's marriage but his opinion must be heard by judge. Thomson Reuters Foundation notes that child marriage occurs from 13 years.
Taiwan	18						Starting 1 January 2023, the legal age of adulthood was lowered from 20 to 18 years; in the same amendment, the marriageable age was also increased to 18 years in order to be consistent with the legal age of adulthood. Therefore the case of marriage with parental consent no longer exists.
Tajikistan	18		17		–		
Thailand	18				–		
Turkey	18		17		16		
Turkmenistan	18		17				
United Arab Emirates	18	Not allowed	18		None		Muslim women require consent of male guardian (wali) at any age, but this can be overriden by a judge. No minimum stipulated with judge's permission.
Uzbekistan	18				18	17	
Vietnam	20	18	20	18	20	18	
Yemen	15	Not allowed	None				HRW notes no legal minimum age for marriage under Yemeni law, and UNSD notes that child marriage is permitted where "such marriage will entail some clear benefit." Muslim women require consent of male guardian (wali) at any age, but this can be overriden by a judge.

==== Lebanon ====
Community	Without judicial consent		With judicial consent		Notes
Community	Male	Female	Male	Female	Notes
Sunni	18	17	17	15	Raised to 15 in 2021
Shi'a	Puberty	Puberty	15	9	
Druze	18	17	16	15	
Catholic Church	16	14	-	-	
Armenian Orthodox	18	14	16	14	
Syrian Orthodox	18	14	-	-	
Evangelical	18	16	16	14	
Assyrian Church of the East	18	15	Unspecified		
Jewish	18	12.5	13	12.5	

=== Europe ===
The marriageable age as a right is 18 years in all European countries, with the exception of Scotland where it is 16 (regardless of gender). Existing exceptions to this general rule (usually requiring special judicial or parental consent) are discussed below. In both the European Union and the Council of Europe the marriage act states: The Istanbul convention, the first legally binding instrument in Europe in the field of violence against women and domestic violence, only requires countries which ratify it to prohibit forced marriage (Article 37) and to ensure that forced marriages can be easily voided without further victimization (Article 32), but does not make any reference to a minimum age of marriage.

Country	Without parental or judicial consent		With parental consent		With judicial consent		Notes
Country	Male	Female	Male	Female	Male	Female	Notes
Albania	18						
Andorra	18						
Austria	18						Since 2025 child marriage is prohibited.
Belarus	18						
Belgium	18				None		With parental consent, serious reasons are required for a minor to marry; without parental consent, the unwillingness of the parents has to constitute an abuse.
Bosnia and Herzegovina	18				16		In both entities and the Brčko District.
Bulgaria	18						Since 2023 18 without exceptions,
Croatia	18				16		Croatian Family Act, Article 25
Czech Republic	18				16		Article 672 of Act No. 89/2012 Coll. the Civil Code (which came into force in 2014) states that the court may, in exceptional cases, allow a marriage of a 16 year old, if there are serious reasons for it. Moreover, a minor can marry if he or she has been granted full capacity by a court decision as given by Article 37 of the Civil Code.
Denmark	18						
Estonia	18						Since 2022, marriage under 18 is prohibited.
Finland	18						In Finland, all marriages under 18 years is completely legally banned with no exemptions since June 1, 2019.
France	18				16		Under 18, permission from a court or one parent. In France the legal age for marriage was equalized for both sexes at 18 in 2006, but in exceptional cases a court may allow marriage at younger ages.
Germany	18						The minimum age was explicitly set to 18 on July 22, 2017. (Before this day, a Family Court could issue an exception for 16–18 year-olds if one party was over 18.) Marriages with a spouse under 16 are legally void. For a 16–17 year old spouse the marriage is repealed.
Gibraltar	18				16		
Greece	18				None		Under 18 requires court permission, which may be given if there are serious reasons for such a marriage.
Hungary	18				16		16 years with authorization from the guardianship authority.
Iceland	18						Since 2022, marriage under 18 is prohibited.
Ireland	18						Since 2019, marriage under 18 is prohibited.
Italy	18				16		
Latvia	18		16				
Liechtenstein	18				None		
Lithuania	18				15	None	Minors can only marry below 15 years with court permission if they are pregnant females.
Luxembourg	18				None		New laws of 2014 fixed the marriageable age at 18 years for both sexes; prior to these regulations, the age was 16 for females and 18 for males. The new laws still allow both sexes to obtain judicial consent to get married under 18.
Malta	18						Since 2025, marriage under 18 banned without exceptions. Prior to 2025, 16 years with parental consent, specifically for "a person who is subject to paternal authority or to tutorship", however, if this was unattainable, the court was able to provide the consent.
Moldova	18				16		16 years if there are valid reasons with both judicial and parental permission.
Montenegro	18				16		
Netherlands	18						Marriage under 18 is prohibited. Exceptions were removed by a change in the law in 2015.
North Macedonia	18				16		16 years with court approval for male and female, their consent and their parents' consent is needed.
Norway	18						Prior to 2018 16 years with consent from parents (guardian) and permission from the County Governor. Since 2018, marriage under 18 banned without exceptions.
Poland	18					16	Article 10. §1. No one under the age of eighteen can enter into marriage. However, if there are important reasons, the guardianship court may permit a woman who has reached the age of sixteen to marry where the circumstances show that the marriage would be in the best interests of the newly established family.
Portugal	18						Since 2 April 2025, the minimum legal age is 18 in all circumstances. Previously, 16 year-olds could marry with parent or judicial consent.
Romania	18				16		16, if there are valid reasons, with both judicial and parental permission, as well as medical approval.
Russia	18		16		15 or 14 depending on region		14 in Adygea, the Republic of Tatarstan, Vladimir, Vologda, Kaluga, Magadan, Moscow, Nizhny Novgorod, Novgorod, Oryol, Sakhalin, Tambov, Tula, Samara and Tyumen Oblasts, the Jewish Autonomous Oblast, and the Khanty-Mansi and Chukotka Autonomous Okrugs; 15 in Murmansk, Ryazan, Tver, and Chelyabinsk Oblasts, the Kabardino-Balkaria, Bashkortostan and Karachay-Cherkess Republics
San Marino	18				16		
Serbia	18				16		
Slovakia	18				16		
Slovenia	18				None		Under 18 years may be approved by the Social Work Center if there are "well founded reasons" arising upon investigation of the situation of the minor. (Art 23, 24 of the Law on Marriage and Family Relations).
Spain	18				16		
Sweden	18						Not possible to marry under the age of 18 since July 1, 2014.
Switzerland	18						To be able to marry, the prospective spouses must have reached 18 years of age and have the capacity of judgement.
Ukraine	18				16		In 2012 the Family Code of Ukraine was amended to allow persons aged 16 to marry under certain circumstances if issued by a court (article 23).
United Kingdom	16 in Scotland and Northern Ireland		See notes				England and Wales: 18 Scotland: 16 Northern Ireland: 16 years with parental consent (with the court able to give consent in some cases).
United Kingdom	18 in England and Wales		See notes				England and Wales: 18 Scotland: 16 Northern Ireland: 16 years with parental consent (with the court able to give consent in some cases).

=== Oceania ===
Country	Without parental or judicial consent		With parental consent		With judicial consent		Notes
Country	Male	Female	Male	Female	Male	Female	Notes
Australia	18				16		16 years with permission from a court and both parents (only granted in exceptional circumstances). Also in its external territories.
Fiji	18						
Kiribati	21		18		–		
Micronesia	18		18	16	–		
Nauru	18						
New Zealand	18				16		16 years with permission from a court and both parents.
Niue	18						Family Relationships Act 2022
Palau	18	16	18	16	–		
Papua New Guinea	21		18	16	16	14	
Samoa	21		18				
Solomon Islands	18		15		–		
Tonga	18						Since 2026, marriage under 18 is prohibited.
Tokelau	21	19	18	16	–		
Tuvalu	21		18				
Vanuatu	21		18	16	–		

== By religion ==
=== Judaism ===
==== Classical Antiquity ====
In ancient Israel men twenty years old and older would become warriors and when they get married they would get one year leave of absence to be with their wife.

Rabbis estimated the age of maturity from about the beginning of the thirteenth year for women and about the beginning of the fourteenth year for men.

On the practice of Levirate marriage, the Talmud advised against a large age gap between a man and his brother's widow. A younger woman marrying a significantly older man, however, is especially problematic: marrying one's young daughter to an old man was declared by the Sanhedrin as reprehensible as forcing her into prostitution.

==== Post-Classical period ====
In Rabbinic Judaism, males cannot consent to marriage until they reach the age of 13 years and a day and have undergone puberty and females cannot consent to marriage until they reach the age of 12 years and a day and have undergone puberty. Males and females are considered minors until the age of twenty. After twenty, males are not considered adults if they show signs of impotence. If males show no signs of puberty or do show impotence, they automatically become adults by age 35 and can marry. Marriage involved a double ceremony, which included the formal betrothal and wedding rites.

The minimum age for marriage was 13 years old for males and 12 years old for females but formal betrothal could take place before that and often did. Talmud advises males to get married at 18 years old or between 16 years old and 24 years old.

A ketannah (literally meaning "little [one]") was any girl between the age of 3 years and that of 12 years plus one day; she was subject to her father's authority, and he could arrange a marriage for her without her agreement, and that marriage remains binding even after reaching the age of maturity. If a girl was orphaned from her father, or she was married by his authority and subsequently divorced, she, her mother, or her brother could marry her in a quasi-binding fashion. Until the age of maturity, she could annul the marriage retroactively. After reaching the age of maturity, intercourse with her husband renders her officially married.

=== Christianity ===
Catholic Canon law adopted Roman law, which set the minimum age of marriage at 12 years old for females and 14 years old for males. The Roman Catholic Church raised the minimum age of marriage to 14 years old for females and to 16 years old for males in 1917 and lowered the age of majority to 18 years old in 1983. The Code of Canons of the Eastern Churches states the same requirements in canon 800.

blank	Without parental or ordinary officer consent		With parental consent		With ordinary officer consent		Notes
blank	Male consent	Female consent	Male consent	Female consent	Male consent	Female consent	Notes
Roman Catholic Church	18	18	16	14	16	14	The minimum ages of consent for marriage in the Catholic Church are 14 for girls and 16 for boys. Being underage constitutes a diriment impediment. That is, a marriage involving an underage bride or groom is canonically invalid. A Conference of Bishops may adopt a higher age for marriage, but in that case, the higher age only creates a prohibitive impediment, that is, a marriage involving a bride or groom above the Church's minimum age but below that set by the Conference is valid but illicit. Permission to marry against a civil authority's directive requires the permission of the Ordinary, which, in the case of sensible and equal laws regarding marriageable age, is not usually granted. The permission by the Ordinary is also required in case of a marriage of a minor when their parents are unaware of his marriage or if their parents reasonably oppose the marriage.
United Methodist Church	18						Since 2024 the church disavows any marriages under the age of 18.

==== Higher ages set by Conferences of Bishops ====
	Male consent	Female consent	Notes
Canada	18		
England and Wales	16		
Gambia	18	16	
Liberia	18	16	
New Zealand	16		
Nigeria	see note		Each bishop has the authority to set a higher prohibitive minimum age.
Philippines	21	18	
Sierra Leone	18	16	

=== Islam ===
Büchler and Schlater state that "marriageable age according to classical Islamic law coincides with the occurrence of puberty. The notion of puberty refers to signs of physical maturity such as the emission of semen or the onset of menstruation". Hanafi school of classical Islamic jurisprudence interpret the "age of marriage", in the Quran (24:59;65:4), as the beginning of puberty.

Shafiʽi, Hanbali, Maliki, and Ja'fari schools of classical Islamic jurisprudence interpret the "age of marriage", in the Quran (24:59), as completion of puberty. For Shafiʽi, Hanbali, and Maliki schools of Islamic jurisprudence, in Sunni Islam, the condition for marriage is physical (bulugh) maturity and mental (rushd) maturity.

Marriages are traditionally contracted by the father or guardian of the bride and her intended husband.

The 1917 codification of Islamic family law in the Ottoman Empire distinguished between the age of competence for marriage, which was set at 18 years for boys and 17 years for girls, and the minimum age for marriage, which followed the traditional Hanafi minimum ages of 12 for boys and 9 for girls. Marriage below the age of competence was permissible only if proof of sexual maturity was accepted in court, while marriage under the minimum age was forbidden.

During the 20th century, most countries in the Middle East followed the Ottoman precedent in defining the age of competence, while raising the minimum age to 15 or 16 for boys and 15–16 for girls. Marriage below the age of competence is subject to approval by a judge and the legal guardian of the child. Egypt diverged from this pattern by setting the age limits of 18 years for boys and 16 years for girls, without a distinction between competence for marriage and minimum age.

Many senior clerics in Saudi Arabia have opposed setting a minimum age for marriage, arguing that a girl reaches adulthood at puberty.

However in 2019, members of the Saudi Shoura Council in 2019 approved fresh regulations for child marriage that will see to outlaw marrying off 15-year-old children and force the need for court approval for those under 18 years. The Chairman of the Human Rights Committee at the Shoura Council, Dr. Hadi Al-Yami, said that introduced controls were based on in-depth studies presented to the body. He pointed out that the regulation, vetted by the Islamic Affairs Committee at the Shoura Council, has raised the age of marriage to 18 years and prohibited it for those under 15 years.

=== Baháʼí Faith ===
In the Baháʼí Faith's religious book Kitáb-i-Aqdas, the age of marriage is set at 15 years for both boys and girls. It is forbidden to become engaged before the age of 15 years.

=== Hinduism ===
Hindu text Manusmriti states that a female aged 8 year should marry a man aged 24, while a 12 year old female should marry a 30 year old man.

== See also ==
- List of countries by age at first marriage
- Age disparity in sexual relationships
- Arranged marriage
- Child marriage
- Convention on Consent to Marriage, Minimum Age for Marriage and Registration of Marriages (UN treaty)
- Legality of polygamy
- Mature minor doctrine
- Polygamy
- Teenage marriage
