= Darger family =

American polygynist family from Utah

Darger
- Current region: Utah
- Members: Joe, Vicki, Valerie, Alina, and their kids
- Traditions: Fundamentalist Mormonism, polygamy

The Darger family (Joe, Vicki, Valerie, and Alina Darger) is an independent fundamentalist Mormon polygamous family living in Utah, United States. They went public after years of being secretive about their polygamous lifestyle to promote the decriminalization of polygamy in the United States as well as to help reshape the perception of polygamy following the prosecution of Warren Jeffs. In 2013, the Darger family met with Utah legislators in an effort to persuade them to change the laws against polygamy in the state.

Aspects of the HBO series Big Love were inspired by the family, including storylines which mirrored events in their lives. They have also been featured on the TLC series Sister Wives, which follows the Browns, another polygamous family. They also appeared on a TLC special called My Three Wives.

== History ==
Joe, Vicki, Valerie, and Alina all grew up in polygamist families. Joe Darger was 20 years old when he married Alina and Vicki in 1990. In a move that is unusual even in polygamous communities, he courted and married Vicki and Alina simultaneously. Joe married Valerie 10 years later, following her divorce from another polygamous family. Valerie and Vicki are identical twin sisters. Together, the family has 25 children, including five children from Valerie's previous marriage. They describe themselves as independent fundamentalist Mormons.

Like many polygamous families, the Dargers lived a secretive lifestyle for many years because of the fear of discrimination and of criminal charges. At the time, polygamy was a third degree felony which carried a sentence of up to five years in prison. In March 2001, Kyra Darger, the five-month-old daughter of Joe and Alina, died suddenly. It was later discovered that she was born with a heart defect that went undiagnosed. Despite the determination that she died from natural causes, there was no abuse or neglect, and the child received regular medical care, the family underwent a long investigation on the basis that they were polygamists. Their anger over the treatment of their family inspired the Dargers to work to change the way polygamous families were treated. They did a series of national interviews, often using aliases to protect their privacy.

The perception of polygamy in United States took a blow in 2006 when the criminal prosecution of FLDS leader Warren Jeffs uncovered widespread sexual abuse of minors in the sect. Following the negative publicity of polygamy within the FLDS, the Dargers decided to come forward in an effort to reshape how society views polygamous families. They wrote a book entitled Love Times Three: Our True Story of a Polygamous Marriage.
