= Centennial Park group =

Fundamentalist Mormon community

The Centennial Park group is a fundamentalist Mormon group, with approximately 1,500 members that is headquartered in Centennial Park, Arizona. The Centennial Park group broke with Leroy S. Johnson, leader and senior member of the Priesthood Council of the Fundamentalist Church of Jesus Christ of Latter-Day Saints (FLDS Church), in the early 1980s. There is no formal relationship between the FLDS Church and the Centennial Park community. The group is also known as the "Second Ward", "The Work of Jesus Christ" and "The Work".

The Centennial Park group was profiled on the ABC television program Primetime in a story entitled "The Outsiders", and also on The Oprah Winfrey Network's Our America with Lisa Ling. It was also featured in Dawn Porter's television documentary, Dawn Porter: Extreme Wife and on the National Geographic Channel series Polygamy, USA.

== History ==
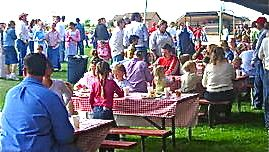
A community event in Centennial Park

The Centennial Park group's claims of authority are based around the accounts of John Wickersham Woolley, Lorin Calvin Woolley and others of a meeting in September 1886 between LDS Church President John Taylor, the Woolleys, and others. Prior to the meeting, Taylor is said to have met with Jesus Christ and the deceased church founder Joseph Smith and to have received a revelation commanding that plural marriage should not cease, but be kept alive by a group separate from the LDS Church. The following day, the Woolleys, and others, were said to have been set apart to keep "the principle" alive.

Members of the Centennial Park group see their history as going back to Joseph Smith and to the beliefs he espoused and practices he established. Until the 1950s, Mormon fundamentalists were largely one group.

=== Priesthood Council split ===
In the early 1980s, significant disagreement arose regarding the question of the presiding authority of the FLDS Church. This disagreement was over what is called the "one man doctrine". The "one man doctrine" refers to section 132:7 of the Doctrine and Covenants, a part of the open scriptural canon of several denominations of the Latter Day Saint movement, which states that "there is never but one on the earth at a time on whom this power and the keys of this priesthood are conferred".

After two council members, Carl Holm and Richard Jessop, died, Leroy Johnson, as senior member of the Priesthood Council, was responsible for recommending new replacements. However Johnson, believing in the "one man doctrine", made no recommendations for new Priesthood Council members.

Then, on 11 July 1983, Guy Musser died, leaving the council evenly split between those who believed in the one man doctrine and those who did not. The remaining council members who opposed the one man doctrine were Marion Hammon and Alma Timpson.

In February 1984, Johnson's health improved enough for him to speak to the FLDS Church membership. Johnson had seldom participated in fundamentalist meetings for quite some time due to illness. He stated,

"I want to say a few words to these men who sit here on the stand today. [He turned to face J. Marion Hammon and Alma A. Timpson.] The Lord gave you men five and a half years to change your thinking on this principle of having one man holding the sealing powers in the earth at a time, and you have made a miserable mess of it by coming here and preaching over this pulpit that I was about to die because of my attitude towards this principle."

Six days later, he declared, "I want to tell you, the first thing that is going to take place is the cleaning up of the Priesthood Council. I want to tell these men on the stand, B Brother J. Marion Hammon, and Brother Alma Adelbert Timpson, that from now on, I am throwing you off my back, and I am not going to carry you any more."

Then Johnson dismissed Hammon and Timpson as members of the Priesthood Council and attempts were made to evict residents siding with Hammon and Timpson from their properties owned by the United Effort Plan, which was once a subsidiary organization of the FLDS Church that owns most of the property in Hildale and Colorado City.

=== Centennial Park ("Second Ward") ===
On 13 May 1984, the portion of Johnson's followers who were dismissed or left on their own held their first Priesthood Meeting just outside town. They named their group the "Second Ward" and began to refer to those who followed Johnson as the "First Ward." Initially, the Second Ward met in the home of Alma Timpson.

By 27 September 1986, the Centennial Park group had built a meeting house and, in 2003, a charter school was built for the town's growing elementary-age population.

Most of this group lives in Centennial Park City, Arizona (36°57′21.96″N 112°58′59.64″W), a town approximately three miles (five km) south of the twin communities of Colorado City, Arizona, and Hildale, Utah, with a small number living in the Salt Lake Valley.

=== The Church of Jesus Christ of Latter-day Saints and the Kingdom of God ===
The Church of Jesus Christ of Latter-day Saints and the Kingdom of God, also known as the Nielsen/Naylor Group, is a group based in the Salt Lake Valley and has around 200 members. It broke with the Centennial Park group after Hammon died in 1988, leaving Alma Timpson as the presiding priesthood leader. Timpson called Frank Naylor as an apostle and Ivan Neilsen as a high priest and later as bishop. Eventually, Naylor and Nielsen disagreed with Timpson's leadership, prompting them to migrate north to Salt Lake County with Frank Naylor presiding.

== Doctrines and practices ==
The Centennial Park group is led by a Priesthood Council and teaches the doctrine of plural marriage. This doctrine states that a man having multiple wives is ordained by God. The doctrine requires multiple wives in order for a man and his wives to receive the highest form of salvation. Like the members of the FLDS Church, the members of the Centennial Park group practice a form of placement marriage, but men do not solicit marriage. That decision is usually left up to the women, who pray for inspiration from God to show them whom they are meant to marry. The exception to this practice is demonstrated on Polygamy, USA when a young woman in the community requests that the men of the church take over this task, having already prayed for divine inspiration for two years without discovering the identity of her intended spouse. If the Priesthood Council gives a young woman a name the woman is supposed to pray for confirmation from God.

== Leaders ==
- J. Marion Hammon (1983–1988)
- Alma A. Timpson (1988–1997)
- John W. Timpson (1997–present)

== See also ==
- Factional breakdown: Mormon fundamentalist sects
- List of Mormon fundamentalist churches
- List of Mormon fundamentalist leaders
- Mormon fundamentalism
