= Rebecca Musser =

American author and activist

- Born: Rebecca Wall; August 31, 1976 (age 50); Hildale, Utah, U.S.
- Education: Alta Academy (Grades 2–12)
- Occupations: Author and activist
- Known for: Involvement in the Fundamentalist Church of Jesus Christ of Latter-Day Saints
- Spouse: Rulon Jeffs (m. 1995; died 2002) Ben Musser (m. 2004, divorced)
- Relatives: Elissa Wall (sister)

Rebecca Musser (née Wall, formerly Jeffs; born 1976) is an American author and activist. She was a wife of the late Fundamentalist Church of Jesus Christ of Latter Day Saints prophet Rulon Jeffs and escaped the compound before bringing legal proceedings against the church.

== Early life, FLDS life, and first marriage ==
Rebecca Wall was born to Sharon Steed and Lloyd Wall, both of whom were members of the Fundamentalist Church of Jesus Christ of Latter-Day Saints (FLDS) and had a polygamous family. At the time of her birth, Musser's father had two wives; his first wife was Myrna and his second was Sharon. Musser remembers her father being frustrated with only having two wives, as other men in the religion had many more.

Lloyd had nine children with Myrna and 14 with Sharon. As Sharon was the second wife, she was lower in rank than Myrna; Sharon and her children lived in the family's basement while Myrna and her children lived upstairs. One of Musser’s sisters is Elissa, author of the memoir Stolen Innocence, an account of her own escape from the church. Musser is mentioned in the book, including her reaction to the fact that Elissa had to marry their cousin at age 14. At around age five, Musser was the victim of sexual abuse along with some of her sisters by an upstairs half-brother. She stated that when Myrna found out about the abuse Musser was "threatened" and did not tell anyone again until she was an adult.

Musser recounts her experience in the FLDS being extremely regimented, stating, "They didn't let us work, they didn't let us go to school. Our sole purpose was to be in religious prayer and to be obedient, adoring." When she turned 19, she became the 19th bride of Rulon Jeffs after he received "divine inspiration" that she was to be his new wife. Rulon was 85 at the time. Musser stated, "I was scared, I was terrified of marrying this man, and yet I could not say no because it would bring a tremendous amount of shame on my family." After Musser was given to Rulon by her father Lloyd, Lloyd was "gifted a third wife" by Rulon. Musser endured years of sexual abuse by Jeffs until his death in 2002 at age 92. By that time, 63 other women were her "sister-wives", a designation given to the polygamous wives of one man in the FLDS. After Jeffs' death, Musser was told by Jeffs' son and new church leader Warren Jeffs that she needed to remarry. Warren threatened her with her life if she did not obey. Musser was able to escape the compound by scaling a wall which surrounded the house and slipping past Jeffs' armed guards. After her escape, Musser traveled to Oregon to live with her brother.

== Testifying against Warren Jeffs and media exposure ==
Musser testified against Warren Jeffs a total of 20 times and helped prosecutors to win 11 convictions against him. During one of the days testifying for the trial, she showed up in a sleeveless red dress. This was significant because the color red had previously been banned by Jeffs for all church members. Author Debra Weyermann stated, "As the wife of a former prophet, Rebecca had credibility compounded by her collected, steady, and unflappable demeanor in the witness box." After testifying, Musser made headlines in the New York Daily News, AOL, and Marie Claire among others.

In 2013 Musser wrote the memoir The Witness Wore Red: The 19th Wife Who Brought Polygamous Cult Leaders to Justice along with author M. Bridget Cook, which was released by Grand Central Publishing. The title referenced when Musser wore her red dress to Jeffs' trial. The book received a positive welcome from The Today Show and was featured in their 'Today Books' section. The Witness Wore Red was also featured on NPR, Secular News Daily, and others. Publishers Weekly called the memoir a "harrowing account" of FLDS life.

Musser is a member of Sheroes United, a non-profit organization that embraces female role models in communities. Musser is featured as a Shero on their website with a biography focusing on life after leaving the Fundamentalist Church of Jesus Christ of Latter-Day Saints. She has also founded the non-profit organization ClaimRED, an organization dedicated to those who have become victims of human trafficking.

Actress Sabina Gadecki portrays Musser in the 2014 film Outlaw Prophet: Warren Jeffs. Musser recounts her experiences in the 2022 Netflix documentary Keep Sweet: Pray and Obey, directed by Rachel Dretzin.

== Post-FLDS family life ==
After leaving the church, Musser married Rulon Jeffs's grandson Ben Musser and had two children, son Kyle and daughter Natalia, before divorcing.

== Bibliography ==
- Musser, Rebecca; Cook, M. Bridget (2013). The Witness Wore Red: The 19th Wife Who Brought Polygamous Cult Leaders to Justice. Grand Central Publishing. ISBN 978-1455527854.

== Filmography ==
Television
Year	Title	Role	Notes
2013	Piers Morgan Live	Self	Episode: "Starbucks and Guns"
2013	Inside Edition	Self	Episode: "Caught on Tape"
2020	Dateline NBC	Self	Episode: "Unbreakable"
2022	Keep Sweet: Pray and Obey	Self	Documentary series
