= Stolen Innocence =

2008 book by Elissa Wall with Lisa Pulitzer

- Author: Elissa Wall
- Language: English
- Publisher: William Morrow
- Publication date: May 13, 2008
- Publication place: United States
- Media type: Print (Hardcover and Paperback)
- Pages: 448
- ISBN: 978-0-06-162801-6

Stolen Innocence: My Story of Growing Up in a Polygamous Sect, Becoming a Teenage Bride, and Breaking Free of Warren Jeffs is an autobiography by American author Elissa Wall detailing her childhood in the Fundamentalist Church of Jesus Christ of Latter Day Saints (FLDS) and subsequent later life outside of the church. It was first published by William Morrow and Company in 2008.

Wall was born into a polygamous family in Salt Lake City and grew up attending the FLDS-run Alta Academy. She describes her living situation as tense; familial relations were further complicated when her mother was reassigned to marry another man in Hildale, Utah. FLDS leaders orchestrated a marriage between Wall, then 14, and her 19-year-old cousin, Allen Steed, an arrangement she vehemently opposed. During their four-year marriage, Steed abused her sexually and psychologically, and Wall eventually began an affair with Lamont Barlow, a 25-year-old former member of the FLDS. Barlow later persuaded her to leave the church and to press charges against Steed and Warren Jeffs, the FLDS "prophet" who performed the wedding ceremony.

Stolen Innocence sold well, reaching number six on the New York Times bestseller list, but received mixed reviews. Critics were interested in the story but criticized Wall's writing style. Sharp Independent and Killer Films optioned the film rights shortly after its publication and discussed possibly creating a movie adaption of the book.

== Background ==
Elissa Wall was born in Salt Lake City, Utah, on July 7, 1986 to Lloyd (called Douglas in the book) and Sharon (Steed) Wall, both members of the Fundamentalist Church of Jesus Christ of Latter Day Saints (FLDS). The FLDS is a Mormon denomination that split from the mainstream Church of Jesus Christ of Latter-day Saints (LDS) following the latter's decision to outlaw polygamy in 1890. Wall's family practiced polygamy, and Sharon was the second of three wives. As is typical among the FLDS, Wall's parents produced a large number of children. Elissa was raised with 14 siblings born to her mother, Sharon and 10 half siblings by her father. Female members of the FLDS wore "long pioneer style dresses" and styled their hair in traditional buns and braids. The mandated undergarments covered their full form, "from the wrist to the ankle and right up to the neck", while makeup, tattoos, and piercings were not permitted. Wall, along with other FLDS children, grew up attending the Alta Academy, which was owned and run by the church. Warren Jeffs, a leader in the community, read from the Book of Mormon at eight in the morning. "No matter what age you were, you were expected to attend and take notes," said Wall. "It was a very religious education...As a child in that society, you hung on every word. I remember believing in it so much it would almost consume me." She later referred to her education as "brainwashing".

The first major crisis in Wall's early life occurred when she was 13 and her mother was reassigned to marry another man, Fred Jessop. Wall, along with her mother and sisters, moved to Hildale in the year 2000. The new family was particularly large, so the children were required to eat meals in shifts. She compared the experience to starting a new school in terms of aspects of life that she had to become re-accustomed to. Over time, several of her brothers and sisters left or were expelled from the church.

In 2001, FLDS leader Warren Jeffs arranged for a then 14-year-old Wall to marry her 19-year-old cousin, Allen Steed. Wall stated that she despised her cousin and asked that she be given more time or another possible husband. Her stepfather and mother were supportive of the marriage and encouraged her to go through with it, sewing her wedding dress and organizing her honeymoon. She and Steed were married at the Hotsprings Motel in Caliente, Nevada. Warren Jeffs, who had previously insisted that the wedding move forward, performed the ceremony.

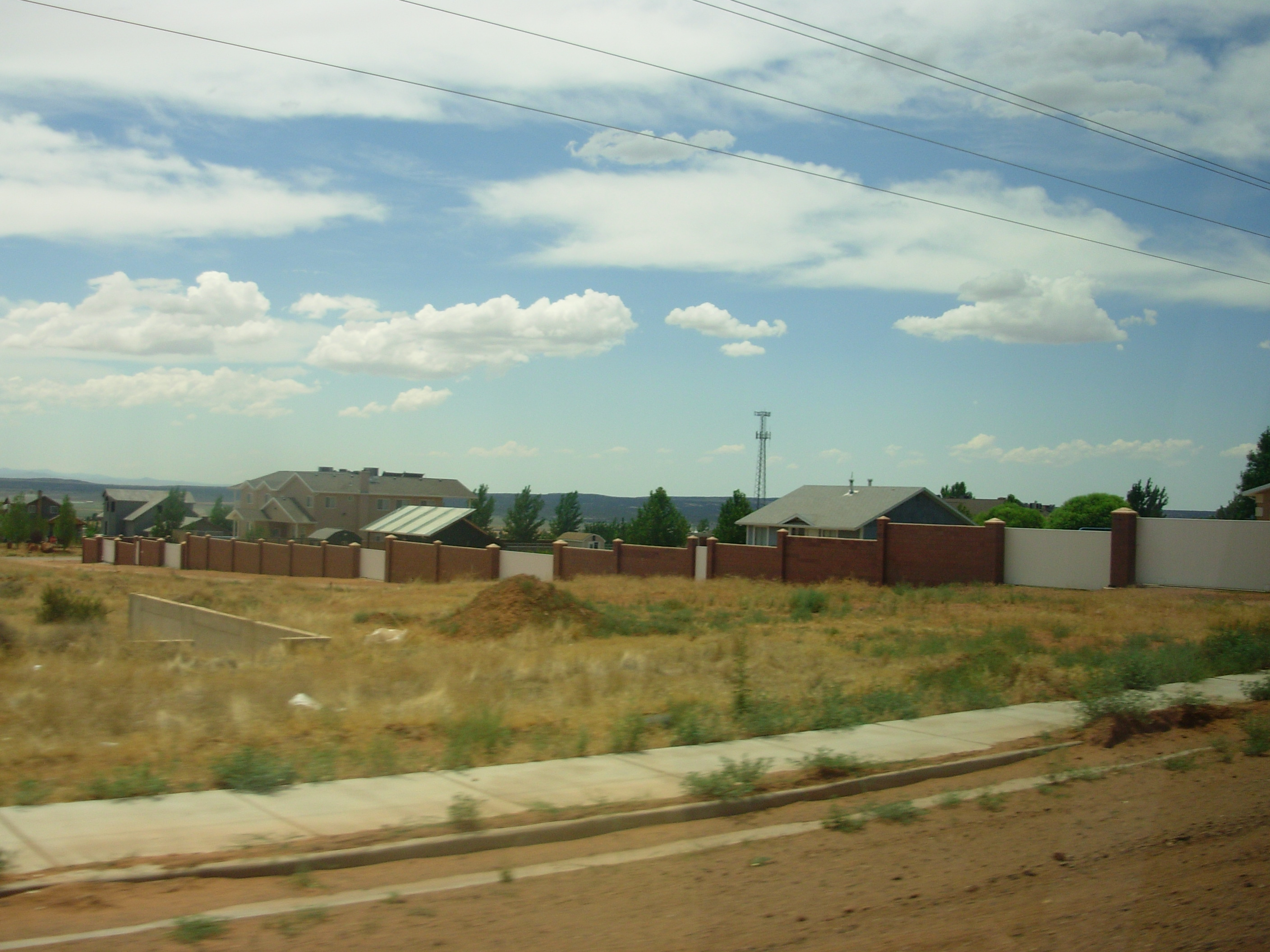
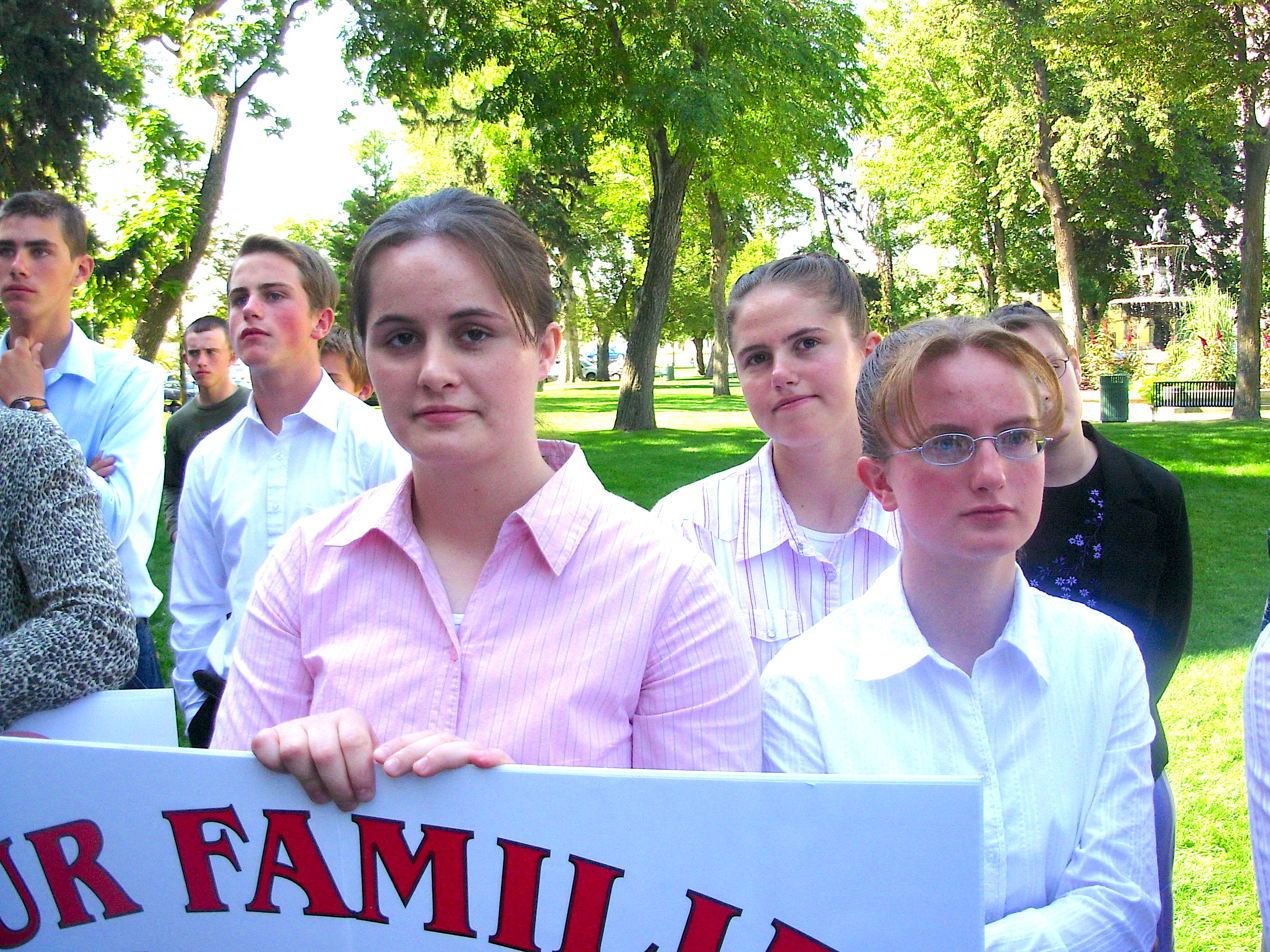
Home of Warren Jeffs (left) and teenagers from the FLDS protesting in favor of plural marriage (right)

Wall describes the marriage as traumatic, with frequent rapes and miscarriages. She recounts that she did not receive any sex education while in school and as a result was unable to understand her husband's advances. As her marriage with her cousin fell apart, she began to spend nights sleeping in her truck, and at that point met former FLDS member Lamont Barlow. Wall, then 17, began an affair with the then 25-year-old Barlow, who encouraged her to leave the church with him. The affair was eventually uncovered when she became pregnant by him, and Jeffs had the marriage to Steed annulled. Wall left the FLDS and married Barlow, having two children with him.

In 2006, Wall pressed charges against Jeffs, who was put on the FBI's Most Wanted list. He was arrested in August of the same year while travelling in Nevada "in a red Cadillac found to contain $54,000 in cash, 15 mobile phones, three iPods, laptop computers, a police scanner, a stack of credit cards and two female wigs, one blonde and one brunette". While testifying, Wall was referred to as Jane Doe IV, though she later asked that her name be published. In September 2007, Jeffs was convicted for two counts of being an accomplice to rape.

== Writing ==
In January 2008, HarperCollins publishers confirmed that Elissa Wall was writing a "tell-all" memoir that was scheduled to be released in April of that year. She chose to use pseudonyms for most of the people who appear in the book but kept the names of the plaintiffs and a few other members of the church unaltered. The book provided the background for Wall's life inside of the FLDS and focused on her marriage to Allen Steed, whom she portrayed as "boorish and odd". She further discussed her opinions on polygamy and the difficulties it caused in her early childhood.

HarperCollins asked Lisa Pulitzer to audition to act as a ghost writer for Wall. Pulitzer describes herself as "the official cult gal" as she enjoys writing escape stories and is able to make the subjects of her work more comfortable during the process. "Elissa called three women mother," she said. "But I come from a blended family, so I understand complicated relations and loyalties."

Wall's attorney commented, "It's going to be a great book. She's never told her story. She's only told little pieces of it." Attorneys for Steed and Warren Jeffs were dismayed by the decision to publish the book before the conclusion of the court case, believing that it would hinder their clients from receiving a fair trial.

== Subsequent events ==
=== 2008 raid ===
State authorities raided the Yearning for Zion Ranch in Schleicher County, Texas in April 2008 after Texas Child Protective Services (CPS) and other authorities received a number of phone calls from Rozita Swinton, an adult Colorado resident. Swinton falsely claimed to be a 16-year-old victim of physical and sexual abuse named "Sarah" who was living at the ranch. Subsequent reports stated that Swinton had repeatedly posed as a child victim. A girl matching "Sarah's" description was not found, and authorities rounded up members of the church. Subsequently, the children—213 boys and 250 girls—were separated from their parents and transported to Fort Concho, "a military facility with inadequate food, lavatories or bathing facilities, and little privacy for people to whom modesty was a basic dignity". After it was determined that there was no evidence that the children were unhealthy, mistreated, or in danger of suffering abuse at the hands of the FLDS, they were returned to the ranch.

Elissa Wall, who participated in the raid by "[educating] the Texas officials on the people", publicly defended the state's actions, saying, "They have reason to fear that the girls are being married and having children at way too young of an age. They have reason to fear that children are in a dangerous place. It doesn't mean the mothers don't love their children. It doesn't mean they don't want to be good mothers. It just means there are reasons for what Texas is doing."

=== Legal proceedings ===
Warren Jeffs' prison life has been tumultuous. At Utah's Purgatory Correctional Facility, he suffered from infected ulcers on his knees, which resulted from praying days on end during solitary confinement. He attempted to commit suicide by hanging himself at one point. In August 2008, Jeffs went into convulsions after banging his head against the walls of his cell repetitively and had to be taken to a hospital by helicopter.

On July 27, 2010, the conviction of Jeffs as an accomplice to Elissa Wall's rape was overturned because "instructions given to jurors were erroneous." State authorities considered retrying Jeffs in Utah, though the matter was complicated when Wall was accused of fabricating a key piece of evidence during the first trial; Wall's attorneys had used medical records for proof of a 2002 miscarriage, and thus proof of intimacy in the marriage. Michael Piccarreta, Jeffs' defense attorney, interviewed Jane Blackmore, Wall's midwife at the time of the miscarriage, in November 2010 and alleged that Wall had requested that she recreate the detailed records when she could not find them. Wall's attorneys responded that she had only "unwittingly" replied to Blackmore's questions during a phone call.

In 2011, Jeffs was convicted in Texas on sexual assault charges unrelated to Wall's case, namely rape of a 15 year old girl and rape of a 12 year old girl. He was sentenced to life in prison plus 20 years. Since Jeffs would therefore be 100 years old by the earliest time he could be released from prison, Utah decided to drop the retrial.

Elissa Wall's cousin and ex-husband Allen Steed was charged with first-degree felony rape after Jeffs' first conviction in 2007. The rape charges were later dropped in favor of Steed entering a plea bargain by confessing to the charge of engaging in sexual relations with a minor. As a result, he would serve 30 days in prison and three years on probation as well as pay $10,000 in fines. Wall was pleased with the outcomes and commented, "This is a good day. I'm grateful for where we're at."

=== Lawsuit ===
In 2005, Elissa Wall filed a multimillion-dollar lawsuit against the FLDS, Jeffs and the UEP Trust with the expressed intention to assist other members of the FLDS in leaving the community. The suit was ongoing for several years afterwards, and a CPA filed a counter-lawsuit in response, charging that Wall's family, not the FLDS or the UEP Trust, was responsible for her underage marriage. In June 2009, she offered to settle the suit for $308,000, the land her family lives on, and some other properties.

== Reception ==
Stolen Innocence reached number six on the New York Times best seller list, and 400,000 copies were confirmed to have been printed by March 2013. Critically, it received mixed reactions. Dwight Garner from The New York Times found the story "both creepy...and quite moving". Caroline Leavitt from People Magazine wrote, "Coming on the heels of the raid on the FLDS compound in Eldorado, Wall's story couldn't be more timely. Her descriptions of the polygamous sect's rigidity are shocking, but what's most fascinating is the immensely likeable author's struggle to reconcile her longing for happiness with her terror of its consequences."

Fritz Lanham of the Houston Chronicle felt that book was too long and that the narrative proceeded at too slow a pace. He was also critical of the reconstructed conversations that appear in the book, describing them as often sounding "contrived".

== Film ==
The film rights were optioned by Sharp Independent and Killer Films in 2008. Jeffrey Sharp and Christine Vachon agreed to collaborate in the creation of a film adaption of the book, and Vachon said that she was "excited about helping to bring this amazing and timely story to the screen".

== See also ==
- Carolyn Jessop
- Escape (Jessop and Palmer book)
- Flora Jessop
