= Church of Jesus Christ (Original Doctrine) Inc. =

Latter-Day Saint denomination

- Classification: Restorationist
- Orientation: Latter Day Saint movement
- Theology: Mormon fundamentalism
- Polity: Hierarchical
- Leader: Winston Blackmore
- Headquarters: Bountiful, British Columbia
- Founder: Winston Blackmore
- Origin: September 2002; Bountiful, British Columbia
- Separated from: FLDS Church
- Members: Approx. 700 members

The Church of Jesus Christ (Original Doctrine) Inc. is a Mormon fundamentalist denomination in the Latter Day Saint movement, and is also known as the Blackmore Group. There are approximately 700 members of this group.

== Establishment of Bountiful, British Columbia ==
In 1946, Harold (aka Michael) Blackmore, a member of the Fundamentalist Church of Jesus Christ of Latter-Day Saints (FLDS Church), bought property near Lister, British Columbia, and moved there with his family. Other members of the church who believed in the principles of plural marriage soon followed. After Winston Blackmore became the bishop in the 1980s, the group took the name of Bountiful, British Columbia. In 1998, the estimated population of Bountiful was 600 and has since grown to about 1,000. Most of the residents are descended from only half a dozen men.

In September 2002, Mormon fundamentalists in Bountiful divided into two groups when Winston Blackmore split with the FLDS Church. Blackmore concluded that Warren Jeffs had exceeded his authority and become too dictatorial; as a result, Blackmore was excommunicated from the FLDS Church. About 700 people broke away and followed Blackmore to form what would eventually be named the Church of Jesus Christ (Original Doctrine) Inc. About 500 people in Bountiful remained members of the FLDS Church.

== See also ==
- List of Mormon fundamentalist churches
- List of Mormon fundamentalist leaders
- Mormon fundamentalism
- Plural marriage
