= Bountiful, British Columbia =

Settlement in Canada

- Settlement
- Location of Bountiful in British Columbia
- Coordinates: 49°01′06″N 116°25′46″W
- Country: Canada
- Province: British Columbia
- Region: Kootenays
- Regional district: Central Kootenay

Population (2007)
  - Total: 1,000 estimated
- Time zone: UTC-7 (MST)
- Area codes: 250, 778

Bountiful is a settlement in the Creston Valley of southeastern British Columbia, Canada, near Cranbrook and Creston. The closest community is Lister, British Columbia.

Bountiful is made up of members of two polygamist Mormon fundamentalist groups. The settlement is named after Bountiful in the Book of Mormon.

== History ==
The first member of the group that bought property near Lister was Harold Michael Blackmore, who moved there with his family in 1946. Other members of the church who believed in the principle of plural marriage soon followed. After Winston Blackmore became the bishop in the 1980s, the group took the name of Bountiful.

Bountiful's estimated population was 600 in 1998 and has since grown to about 1,000. Most of the residents are descended from only half a dozen men.

Bountiful's Mormon fundamentalists have divided into two groups: about half are members of the Fundamentalist Church of Jesus Christ of Latter-Day Saints (FLDS Church), and the rest are members of the Church of Jesus Christ (Original Doctrine) Inc., an FLDS offshoot based on the teachings of Blackmore, who split with the FLDS Church after concluding the president of the church, Warren Jeffs, had exceeded his authority and become too dictatorial. The FLDS bishop is James Oler.

== Allegations of abuse ==
On April 19, 2005, Bountiful's leaders held an extensive press conference in an effort to dispel many of the allegations of abuse that had surrounded their community.

Bountiful has come under intense scrutiny for its involvement in the polygamous FLDS Church. Warren Jeffs, who was one of the FBI's Ten Most Wanted Fugitives, is thought to have visited a dozen or so times in 2005. On January 28, 2006, the Vancouver Sun released information that Utah's attorney general was collaborating with British Columbia's attorney general in attempting to deal with polygamy and the alleged abuse in these communities. Jeffs was captured by the authorities outside Las Vegas in August 2006 during a routine traffic stop. On September 25, 2007, he was found guilty of being an accomplice to rape. Prosecutors said Jeffs forced a 12-year-old girl into marriage and sex with her 19-year-old first cousin. Jeffs faced five years to life in prison on each of two felony charges. Utah Attorney General Mark Shurtleff said, "Everyone should now know that no one is above the law; religion is not an excuse for abuse, and every victim has a right to be heard."

On May 16, 2006, Blackmore's family invited the media to visit in response to a recent visit by the Royal Canadian Mounted Police, indicating that they felt persecuted. Three of Blackmore's putative wives could face deportation, as they are U.S. citizens and would not be considered legally married to a Canadian.

On June 6, 2007, the province of British Columbia announced the appointment of high-profile Vancouver criminal lawyer Richard Peck as a special prosecutor to review the results of a police investigation into possible polygamous activity or other offences by members of the community. On August 1, 2007, Peck concluded that there was not enough evidence to charge the group with sexual abuse or exploitation charges, as it had been extraordinarily difficult to find victims willing to testify, and the defendants were likely to claim "religious freedom" as a defense.

Peck suggested that British Columbia ask the courts whether current polygamy laws, specifically section 293 of the Criminal Code, are constitutional. Peck said that it was time to find out whether Canada's polygamy laws would stand. He said, "If the law is upheld, members of the Bountiful community will have fair notice that their practice of polygamy must cease." The Supreme Court of British Columbia upheld Canada's polygamy laws in a 2011 reference case.

In July 2017, two men from the FLDS community, Blackmore and Oler, were convicted of one count each of polygamy. Blackmore and Oler are the third and fourth people in Canadian history to be convicted of polygamy. Blackmore was found to have married 24 women and fathered 149 children. In June 2018, both men were given house arrest as a result of their convictions. Blackmore received six months of house arrest followed by 18 months of probation, while Oler received three months of house arrest and 12 months of probation.

In August, 2017, Brandon James Blackmore and Emily Ruth Gail Blackmore were convicted of removing an underage girl from Canada for marriage in the United States. They were sentenced to 12 months and seven months in jail, respectively, followed by probation of 18 months, for transporting a 13-year-old girl to the U.S. in 2004 for marriage to Warren Jeffs. Oler was a third defendant in this case and was acquitted, which was successfully challenged by the Crown. In an August 2019 new trial, Oler was convicted of the same child removal charge and sentenced to 12 months in jail and 18 months of probation. During the trial, records revealed that Jeffs had directed Oler on June 23, 2004, to bring a 15-year-old to the U.S. for marriage. As of August 2011, Jeffs had been sentenced to life in prison for sexually assaulting two underage followers taken as brides.

== See also ==
- Factional breakdown: Mormon fundamentalist sects
- Fundamentalist Church of Jesus Christ of Latter-Day Saints
- Human rights in Canada
- List of denominations in the Latter Day Saint movement
- List of Mormon fundamentalist leaders
- Mormon fundamentalism
- Mormonism and polygamy
- Polygamy in North America: Canada
