= Flora Jessop =

American social activist and author (born 1969)

Flora Jessop (born 1969) is an American social activist, author, and advocate for abused children.

== Biography ==
Jessop was born and raised in Colorado City, Arizona. She was raised in a polygamous family, with two mothers and twenty-seven siblings, all members of the Fundamentalist Church of Jesus Christ of Latter-Day Saints (FLDS).

When she was sixteen years old, after years of abuse, including being impregnated at 12 years of age by her father and being forced to marry her first cousin, Phillip Jessop, she fled her family and faith. After many years as a vagabond in Middle and Southwest America, Jessop finally sought legal justice and was awarded $10,000 in a lawsuit against the State of Arizona for failing to protect her from the abuse she suffered.

Jessop finally settled in Galena, Kansas, where she soon met a man named Tim and started a family with him and their daughters, Shauna and Megan. Jessop's divorce from her cousin Philip was finalized in 1995.

In February 2001, Jessop and Tim married in Baxter Springs, Kansas. In April 2001, her younger 14-year-old sister Ruby was forced to marry her stepbrother, Haven Barlow. The ceremony, officiated by Warren Jeffs, would be the catalyst that turned Jessop into an advocate against child abuse in the FLDS community. She helped, in large part, to create the Child Protection Project.

Flora is the cousin-by-marriage of Carolyn Jessop, another former FLDS member who wrote Escape, an autobiographical account of her upbringing in the polygamist sect and later flight from that community.

Flora has been active since the early 2000s in anti-child abuse work, mainly focusing on the plight of women and children in the FLDS. She founded an organization, "Help the Child Brides" (later dissolved), and later joined "Child Protection Project" with fellow activist Linda Walker.

Jessop is the author of a book, Church of Lies, telling her story. She wrote in her book that her goals are to end child abuse in polygamous cults and also to give a name to all child abuse victims in the United States.

== See also ==
- Dorothy Allred Solomon
- Mormon fundamentalism
- Polygamy and the Latter Day Saint movement
- Current state of polygamy in the Latter Day Saint movement
- List of Latter Day Saint practitioners of plural marriage
- List of former Mormon fundamentalists
