= Dorothy Allred Solomon =

American author and educator

Dorothy Allred Solomon is an American author and educator committed to informing people about the pros and cons of polygamous lifestyles.

== Biography ==
Dorothy Allred was born to Mormon fundamentalist leader Rulon C. Allred and his fourth plural wife. She was the 28th of her father's 48 children. In 1977, her father was murdered by agents of violent polygamist leader Ervil LeBaron.

In her memoirs, Allred is open about and critical of the many problems posed by polygamy as practiced by fundamentalist Mormon sects. These problems include the secrecy that necessitated lying to friends and neighbors about their father, constant poverty, jealousy among wives and siblings, an inability to have an emotionally healthy father-child relationship, sexual repression, violent schisms both from internal and external rivals to leadership, and other issues rarely encountered in monogamy. In the same memoirs, she makes very clear that she had great love and respect for her father, a complex man who was as honorable as his patriarchal position allowed and whose sincerity of belief she never doubted.

As a teenager, Dorothy Allred broke with her father's group, the Apostolic United Brethren, and became a member of the Church of Jesus Christ of Latter-day Saints (LDS Church), which officially renounced polygamy in 1890. She entered into a monogamous marriage and was educated at the University of Utah. Unlike the experience of many apostates from polygamous communities and sects, she did continue a relationship with her parents and many members of her extended family, who continued to accept her as their daughter despite their disappointment that she did not continue the practice of plural marriage.

Solomon was the first contemporary writer to give an insider account of modern-day polygamy. She is the author of five books, including two that describe aspects of her life growing up in fundamentalist Mormon polygamy. She is active in Utah's movement to educate people about polygamy. She has been a guest on The Oprah Winfrey Show, the Today Show, Larry King Live, Hannity & Colmes, and other talk and news programs.

Solomon lives with her husband in Saint George, Utah.

== Publications ==
- (1984). In My Father's House: An Autobiography of Dorothy Allred Solomon (New York: Franklin Watts, ISBN 0-531-09763-3)
- (1984). Inside Out: Creative Writing in the Classroom (Salt Lake City: Utah Arts Council)
- (2003). Predators, Prey, and Other Kinfolk: Growing Up in Polygamy (New York: W. W. Norton, ISBN 0-393-04946-9)
- (2004). Daughter of the Saints: Growing Up In Polygamy (New York: W. W Norton, ISBN 0-393-32577-6)
- "Very Big Love", Marie Claire, 2007-11-15
- (2008). The Sisterhood: Inside the Lives of Mormon Women (New York: Palgrave Macmillan, ISBN 0-230-60786-1)
- (2009). In My Father's House: A Memoir of Polygamy (Texas: Texas Tech University, ISBN 978-0896726468)
- (2020). Finding Karen: An Ancestral Mystery (Texas: Texas Tech University Press, ISBN 978-1-68283-061-1)

== See also ==
- Rena Chynoweth
- Carolyn Jessop
- Flora Jessop
- List of former Mormon fundamentalists
