= Lister, British Columbia =

- Location within British Columbia
- Coordinates: 49°03′00″N 116°28′00″W
- Country: Canada
- Province: British Columbia
- Region: Kootenays
- Regional district: Central Kootenay
- Time zone: UTC-7 (MST)
- Postal code span: V0B 1Y0
- Area codes: 250, 778

Lister, British Columbia is a small community in the Kootenays region of British Columbia, Canada. It is located 10 miles (16 km) southeast of Creston and is just north of the Canada–US border.

Originally known as Camp Lister, it was established by Colonel Fred Lister after the First World War as a soldiers' settlement. He later became the MLA for the Nelson-Creston riding. The community's name was officially changed to Lister on November 29, 1984. Lister is the closest community to the Bountiful commune.

== Climate ==
Climate data for Lister (1981-2010)
Month	Jan	Feb	Mar	Apr	May	Jun	Jul	Aug	Sep	Oct	Nov	Dec	Year
Record high °C (°F)	12.0 (53.6)	14.5 (58.1)	23.0 (73.4)	26.0 (78.8)	33.0 (91.4)	36.5 (97.7)	38.0 (100.4)	37.5 (99.5)	36.0 (96.8)	26.0 (78.8)	16.5 (61.7)	10.5 (50.9)	38.5 (101.3)
Mean daily maximum °C (°F)	0.9 (33.6)	3.4 (38.1)	8.7 (47.7)	14.4 (57.9)	18.8 (65.8)	22.4 (72.3)	27.8 (82.0)	27.6 (81.7)	22.1 (71.8)	13.1 (55.6)	5.1 (41.2)	0.5 (32.9)	13.7 (56.7)
Daily mean °C (°F)	−1.9 (28.6)	−0.3 (31.5)	3.9 (39.0)	8.5 (47.3)	12.5 (54.5)	16.0 (60.8)	20.0 (68.0)	19.7 (67.5)	15.0 (59.0)	8.0 (46.4)	2.0 (35.6)	−2.1 (28.2)	8.4 (47.2)
Mean daily minimum °C (°F)	−4.7 (23.5)	−4.0 (24.8)	−1.0 (30.2)	2.6 (36.7)	6.2 (43.2)	9.6 (49.3)	12.2 (54.0)	11.8 (53.2)	7.9 (46.2)	3.0 (37.4)	−1.1 (30.0)	−4.8 (23.4)	3.1 (37.7)
Record low °C (°F)	−26.5 (−15.7)	−24.5 (−12.1)	−16.5 (2.3)	−5.0 (23.0)	−2.0 (28.4)	2.0 (35.6)	4.5 (40.1)	1.5 (34.7)	−2.5 (27.5)	−13.0 (8.6)	−19.0 (−2.2)	−27.5 (−17.5)	−27.5 (−17.5)
Average precipitation mm (inches)	57.0 (2.24)	33.0 (1.30)	42.3 (1.67)	40.1 (1.58)	69.3 (2.73)	66.6 (2.62)	37.2 (1.46)	28.0 (1.10)	31.5 (1.24)	39.7 (1.56)	68.0 (2.68)	64.8 (2.55)	577.5 (22.73)
Source: Environment Canada
