= Special prosecutor (Canada) =

Lawyer in Canada

In Canada, a special prosecutor is a lawyer appointed in certain circumstances to ensure the fairness of a prosecution.

In British Columbia, appointments of special prosecutors are governed by Section 7 "Special prosecutors" of the Crown Counsel Act, Chapter 87. The Assistant Deputy Attorney General may appoint a lawyer not employed by the Ministry of Attorney General as a special prosecutor, if he or she "considers it is in the public interest".

In military prosecutions in Canadian Armed Forces, Special Prosecutors are appointed in the circumstances of an actual or perceived conflict of interest during the prosecution. A Special Prosecutor is an officer of the Forces who is a member of the bar of a province in good standing and who is not a member of the Legal Branch of the Forces.
