= Chester, Idaho =

Unincorporated community in the state of Idaho, United States

- Unincorporated community
- Location within Idaho Location within the United States
- Coordinates: 43°59′58″N 111°34′12″W
- Country: United States
- State: Idaho
- County: Fremont
- Elevation: 5,072 ft (1,546 m)
- Time zone: UTC-7 (Mountain (MST))
  - Summer (DST): UTC-6 (MDT)
- ZIP code: 83421
- Area codes: 208, 986
- GNIS feature ID: 371984

Chester is an unincorporated community in Fremont County, Idaho, United States. Chester is located on U.S. Route 20, 6 miles (9.7 km) northeast of St. Anthony. Chester has a post office with ZIP code 83421.

== History ==
Chester's population was estimated at 250 in 1909, and was 100 in 1960.

== Climate ==
According to the Köppen climate classification, Chester has a warm-summer humid continental climate (Köppen climate classification: Dfb).

Climate data for Chester, Idaho, 1991–2020 simulated normals (5066 ft elevation)
Month	Jan	Feb	Mar	Apr	May	Jun	Jul	Aug	Sep	Oct	Nov	Dec	Year
Mean daily maximum °F (°C)	28.6 (−1.9)	33.1 (0.6)	43.7 (6.5)	54.5 (12.5)	64.8 (18.2)	72.9 (22.7)	82.9 (28.3)	82.8 (28.2)	72.5 (22.5)	57.6 (14.2)	41.4 (5.2)	29.5 (−1.4)	55.4 (13.0)
Daily mean °F (°C)	19.8 (−6.8)	23.5 (−4.7)	33.1 (0.6)	41.9 (5.5)	50.9 (10.5)	58.3 (14.6)	65.7 (18.7)	64.8 (18.2)	56.1 (13.4)	43.9 (6.6)	31.3 (−0.4)	21.0 (−6.1)	42.5 (5.8)
Mean daily minimum °F (°C)	10.9 (−11.7)	14.0 (−10.0)	22.5 (−5.3)	29.5 (−1.4)	37.0 (2.8)	43.5 (6.4)	48.6 (9.2)	46.8 (8.2)	39.6 (4.2)	30.2 (−1.0)	22.5 (−5.3)	12.4 (−10.9)	29.8 (−1.2)
Average precipitation inches (mm)	1.48 (37.56)	1.03 (26.13)	1.07 (27.17)	1.39 (35.20)	1.96 (49.90)	1.60 (40.62)	0.58 (14.68)	0.70 (17.68)	1.07 (27.29)	1.36 (34.61)	1.10 (27.82)	1.56 (39.67)	14.9 (378.33)
Average dew point °F (°C)	15.8 (−9.0)	17.8 (−7.9)	22.8 (−5.1)	26.1 (−3.3)	33.1 (0.6)	38.8 (3.8)	40.6 (4.8)	38.7 (3.7)	33.6 (0.9)	28.2 (−2.1)	22.5 (−5.3)	16.5 (−8.6)	27.9 (−2.3)
Source: Prism Climate Group
