= James Oler =

Canadian religious leader and criminal (born 1964)

- Born: James Marion Oler; 4 June 1964 (age 61); British Columbia, Canada
- Occupation: Bishop
- Known for: Practicing polygamy
- Children: 13

James Marion Oler (born 1964) is the bishop of the Fundamentalist Church of Jesus Christ of Latter-Day Saints (FLDS Church) in Canada and has been convicted of being a practicing polygamist. The polygamy case brought against Oler in 2009 was considered "the first major test of Canada's polygamy law." As of 2014, he is reported to have 13 children.

== FLDS schism in Canada ==
James Oler is the current bishop of the Canadian FLDS, who are centered in Bountiful, British Columbia, Canada. In 2002, Winston Blackmore was excommunicated from the FLDS, and the community of Bountiful, where most members live, divided between Blackmore and Warren Jeffs. Following this schism, Jeffs appointed Oler as the new bishop.

== Polygamy trial in Canada ==
Oler and Blackmore were arrested by the Royal Canadian Mounted Police in January 2009 and charged with polygamy. The charges were later thrown out owing to questions about how the Crown selected its prosecutors. On 23 September 2009, criminal polygamy charges against Winston Blackmore and Oler were thrown out by B.C. Supreme Court Judge Sunni Stromberg-Stein.

Polygamy charges were brought against Blackmore and Oler again in August 2014 without the procedural errors that caused the previous charges to have been thrown out of court.

On 24 July 2017, James Oler was found guilty of polygamy in the B.C. Supreme Court. He, along with Winston Blackmore, face up to five years in prison for violation of Section 293 of the Criminal Code of Canada.

On 15 May 2018, in Cranbrook, British Columbia, special prosecutor Peter Wilson recommended a jail sentence of one month to 90 days for Oler and a term between 90 days and six months for Blackmore. On 27 June 2018, Justice Sheri Ann Donegan sentenced Blackmore to six months' house arrest. Oler was sentenced to three months' house arrest.

In May 2019, Oler was found guilty of taking a 15-year-old girl to the USA in 2004 to be married to an older man (a member of the FLDS Church), with Justice Martha Devlin saying there was "no room for doubt" that Oler knew the underage girl would be subject to sexual contact. In August 2019, Oler was sentenced to 12 months in jail and 18 months probation.

== See also ==
- Marriage in Canada
