= Winston Blackmore =

Canadian polygamist

- Born: August 25, 1956 (age 69); British Columbia, Canada
- Occupation: Polygamous church leader
- Known for: "Canada's best-known avowed polygamist"
- Spouses: 27
- Children: 150
- Parents: Ray Blackmore (father); Anna Mae (mother)

Winston Blackmore (born August 25, 1956) is the leader of a polygamous Fundamentalist Latter Day Saint religious group in Bountiful, British Columbia, Canada. He is described as "Canada's best-known avowed polygamist". He has 150 children with his 27 "spiritual" wives, some of whom he has admitted were underage.

== Leadership and excommunication ==
The polygamous community at Bountiful was founded by Blackmore's father, Ray Blackmore, and his older cousin, Harold Wooley Blackmore. Ray later removed Harold and took full control of Bountiful.

Winston Blackmore was born to Ray and Anna Mae Blackmore on August 25, 1956. He was the ninth of her 13 children. Anna Mae was the first of Ray's six wives and the only one he was legally married to.

For two decades, Blackmore was the bishop of the Bountiful, British Columbia group of the Fundamentalist Church of Jesus Christ of Latter-Day Saints (FLDS Church), a polygamist community in the Creston Valley. Upon the death of Rulon Jeffs, Winston Blackmore was considered as one of two potential successors for the role of the president of the Fundamentalist Church of Jesus Christ of Latter-Day Saints, with the other being Warren Jeffs. Jeffs ultimately succeeded his father, largely due to having played an increasingly significant role in the church during the period preceding Rulon's death. More than half of the Canadian branch members left the FLDS Church to stay with Blackmore as their leader.

In September 2002, Warren Jeffs excommunicated Blackmore; however, Blackmore asserts that he left the church of his own accord. The community of Bountiful was split nearly in half—about 400 people followed Blackmore, and the rest followed Jeffs. Blackmore went on to found the Church of Jesus Christ (Original Doctrine) Inc.

== Canadian polygamy case ==
Blackmore and another community leader, James Oler who had replaced Blackmore as FLDS bishop, were arrested by the Royal Canadian Mounted Police in January 2009 and charged with polygamy. The charges were later thrown out owing to questions about how the Crown selected its prosecutors.

The case was reopened by the provincial government in 2014, with the British Columbia Supreme Court confirming that polygamy is against the law in a constitutional case. Blackmore's lawyers attempted to appeal the case, which was overruled in May 2016. Blackmore's trial began on April 18, 2017.

On July 24, 2017, Blackmore was found guilty of polygamy in the British Columbia Supreme Court. He and Oler faced up to five years in prison for violation of Section 293 of the Criminal Code of Canada.

On May 15, 2018, in Cranbrook, British Columbia, special prosecutor Peter Wilson recommended a jail sentence of between 90 days and six months for Blackmore and a term of one month to 90 days for Oler. On 27 June 2018, Justice Sheri Ann Donegan sentenced Blackmore to six months' house arrest. Oler was sentenced to three months' house arrest.

== Family ==
As of August 31, 2019, Blackmore has married 27 wives and has 150 children.

He is the nephew of former Social Credit Party of Canada leader John Horne Blackmore who, though not a polygamist himself, was excommunicated by the Church of Jesus Christ of Latter-day Saints in 1947 for "teaching and advocating the doctrine of plural marriage". As an MP, the elder Blackmore urged Parliament to repeal the anti-polygamy law and succeeded in removing specific references to Mormons in the law.

Blackmore is also related to anti-polygamy activists Carolyn Jessop, a former FLDS member and author, and Ruby Jessop. His family operates J R Blackmore & Sons Ltd, a timber milling business.
