= Centennial Park, Arizona =

Town in Mohave County, Arizona

- Census-designated place
- Location within Arizona Location within the United States
- Coordinates: 36°57′14″N 112°58′53″W
- Country: United States
- State: Arizona
- County: Mohave

Area
  - Total: 2.17 sq mi (5.62 km^{2})
  - Land: 2.17 sq mi (5.62 km^{2})
  - Water: 0 sq mi (0.00 km^{2})
- Elevation: 4,915 ft (1,498 m)

Population (2020)
  - Total: 1,578
  - Density: 727.6/sq mi (280.92/km^{2})
- Time zone: UTC-7 (MST)
- ZIP code: 86021
- Area code: 928
- FIPS code: 04-11500
- GNIS feature ID: 2582750

Centennial Park is an unincorporated community and census-designated place (CDP) in Mohave County, Arizona, United States. The population was 1,578 at the 2020 census, up from 1,264 at the 2010 census. It is the central location for the Centennial Park group, a fundamentalist Mormon group.

== Geography ==
Centennial Park is located in northeastern Mohave County and is bordered to the north by the town of Colorado City. Arizona State Route 389 passes through the CDP, leading east 28 miles (45 km) to Fredonia and northwest into Utah, where it becomes Utah State Route 59, leading 26 miles (42 km) to Hurricane.

According to the United States Census Bureau, the Centennial Park CDP has a total area of 2.17 square miles (5.6 km^{2}), all land.

== Demographics ==
Historical population
Census	Pop.	Note	%±
2010	1,264		—
2020	1,578		24.8%
U.S. Decennial Census

=== Racial and ethnic composition ===
Centennial Park CDP, Arizona – Racial composition Note: the US Census treats Hispanic/Latino as an ethnic category. This table excludes Latinos from the racial categories and assigns them to a separate category. Hispanics/Latinos may be of any race.
Race (NH = Non-Hispanic)	% 2020	% 2010	Pop 2020	Pop 2010
White alone (NH)	98.9%	93.8%	1,561	1,186
Black alone (NH)	0%	0.2%	0	3
American Indian alone (NH)	0.1%	0%	1	0
Asian alone (NH)	0.1%	0.2%	1	2
Pacific Islander alone (NH)	0%	0.1%	0	1
Other race alone (NH)	0%	0%	0	0
Multiracial (NH)	0.4%	0.6%	7	7
Hispanic/Latino (any race)	0.5%	5.1%	8	65

=== 2020 census ===
As of the 2020 census, Centennial Park had a population of 1,578. The median age was 17.0 years. 52.6% of residents were under the age of 18 and 3.7% were 65 years of age or older. For every 100 females there were 94.3 males, and for every 100 females age 18 and over there were 83.3 males age 18 and over.

0.0% of residents lived in urban areas, while 100.0% lived in rural areas.

There were 267 households in Centennial Park, of which 65.9% had children under the age of 18 living in them. Of all households, 58.1% were married-couple households, 13.9% were households with a male householder and no spouse or partner present, and 21.0% were households with a female householder and no spouse or partner present. About 13.1% of all households were made up of individuals and 4.9% had someone living alone who was 65 years of age or older.

There were 285 housing units, of which 6.3% were vacant. The homeowner vacancy rate was 0.5% and the rental vacancy rate was 6.6%.

The most reported ancestries in 2020 were:

- English (46.6%)
- German (15.5%)
- Scottish (6.5%)
- Danish (2.7%)
- Swedish (2.7%)
- Irish (2.7%)
- Scandinavian (2.6%)
- Dutch (2%)

=== 2010 census ===
As of the 2010 census, there were 1,264 people living in the CDP: 569 male and 695 female. 781 were 19 years old or younger, 242 were ages 20–34, 153 were between the ages of 35 and 49, 67 were between 50 and 64, and the remaining 21 were aged 65 and above. The median age was 15.0 years.

The racial makeup of the CDP was 94.6% White, 0.2% Black or African American, 0.2% Asian, 0.1% Native Hawaiian, 2.0% Other, and 2.9% two or more races. 5.1% of the population were Hispanic or Latino of any race.

There were 207 households in the CDP, 187 family households (90.3%) and 20 non-family households (9.7%), with an average household size of 6.11. Of the family households, 127 were married couples living together, with 20 single father and 40 single mother households, while the non-family households included 17 adults living alone: 5 male and 12 female.

The CDP contained 225 housing units, of which 207 were occupied and 18 were vacant.

== Education ==
It is zoned to Colorado City Unified School District.
