= Carolyn Jessop =

American author and former FLDS member (born 1968)

- Born: January 1, 1968 (age 58); Hildale, Utah
- Known for: Author; Custody suit involving FLDS
- Spouses: Merril Jessop, fourth wife (1986 - 2003); Brian Moroney (2015-present)
- Children: 8
- Parent(s): Arthur & Nurylon and Rosie Blackmore
- Relatives: Flora Jessop (cousin)

Carolyn Jessop (born January 1, 1968) is an American author and former Fundamentalist Church of Jesus Christ of Latter Day Saints member who wrote Escape, an autobiographical account of her upbringing in the polygamist sect and later flight from that community. She is the cousin, by marriage, of Flora Jessop, another former FLDS member and advocate for abused children. Carolyn Jessop now lives in the Salt Lake City area with her children.

== Autobiography ==
=== Escape ===
On April 21, 2003, when Jessop was 35, she left her husband's family and the FLDS church, fleeing to a safehouse in Salt Lake City. Subsequently, she sued for custody of her children, and in 2003 became "the first woman ever granted full custody of her children in a contested suit involving the FLDS."

In 2007, she co-authored her book Escape with Laura Palmer, which chronicled her life in the FLDS organization, her adulthood and disillusionment, and her eventual flight. It was published by the Broadway division of Random House. She followed its publication with a book tour. In 2008, actress Katherine Heigl announced she had contracted to produce and star in a feature film based on the memoir.

Jessop was born Carolyn Blackmore and raised by her parents in Hildale, Utah, with her older sister and younger siblings. She is a sixth-generation descendant of a polygamous family, all of whom were faithful members of the FLDS church. She is a relative of Winston Blackmore, leader of a Canadian polygamous group and also a relative of his American-born Uncle John Horne Blackmore, first leader of what became the Social Credit Party of Canada. Her father became a polygamist when he married his wife's niece when Carolyn was a child. Jessop describes her relationship to her parents as emotionally distant, with her father dominating her mother, and her mother taking out her anger on the children with such regularity that the children soon devised a strategy to get their beatings "out of the way" in the mornings.

The autobiography describes a year-long stint in Salt Lake City, Utah, which gave her a taste of the world outside her religious community. She spent most of her childhood in Colorado City, Arizona.

As Jessop relates, a rift in her religious community at about the time she completed middle school led to the leaders pulling children out of the local high school. She graduated from high school at the age of 17. Jessop intended to attend college and then go to medical school to study pediatric medicine; instead, she was forced into an arranged marriage to Merril Jessop at age 18. Merril Jessop was 32 years her senior and already had three wives and more than 30 children, several of them his new wife's age and older; some had been her classmates. Once married, Carolyn Jessop did get to attend college, but her husband decided that she would study elementary education, not medicine. Just months into the marriage, the FLDS's new leader, Rulon Jeffs, gave Merril two new wives.

Carolyn Jessop stated in her book that she endured regular unwanted sexual relations with Jessop in exchange for better emotional treatment. Jessop had eight children with her husband, the last four after her doctors had warned her against further pregnancies. The final pregnancy was life-threatening and required an emergency hysterectomy, during which time, as Jessop maintains, her husband and his family regarded her condition with disinterest. Jessop contends that the resulting freedom from pregnancy helped her escape from her abusive marriage and volatile home situation.

=== Triumph: Life After the Cult, a Survivor's Lessons ===
On May 4, 2010, Jessop released Triumph: Life After the Cult, a Survivor's Lesson, the autobiographical sequel to Escape. Triumph details Jessop's unique insights and inside information regarding the Texas FLDS Raid and its aftermath, as well as Jessop's struggle to come to terms with her oldest daughter's return to the cult. Jessop also reveals the various sources of strength and resources on which she has drawn as she overcame the obstacles to achieving success after a lifetime of trauma living inside a cult. Triumph concludes with Jessop's victorious court battle to win back child support for the years since her escape, as well as lifetime support for her severely disabled son, Harrison.

== April 2008 YFZ Ranch raid ==
Texas law enforcement officers began a raid of the YFZ Ranch on April 3, 2008, following a phone call with allegations of physical and sexual abuse of a 16-year-old girl. Children from the community had been placed in state custody because authorities believed they "had been abused or were at immediate risk of future abuse," a state spokesman said. As of April 8, as many as 533 women and children had been removed from the ranch by authorities. Officers later learned that the phone call was a hoax perpetrated by an adult woman outside the FLDS.

Jessop arrived on-site Sunday, April 6, in hopes of reuniting two of her daughters with their half-siblings. She stated her opinion that the action in Texas was unlike the 1953 Short Creek raid in Arizona. On April 8 she was interviewed by the NBC Today Show regarding the event, and described life at a FLDS community. Jessop had also been in Texas the prior month at a speaking engagement, where she said, "[i]n Eldorado, the crimes went to a whole new level. They thought they could get away with more" but "Texas is not going to be a state that's as tolerant of these crimes as Arizona and Utah have been."

== Legal proceedings ==
Carolyn Jessop has been involved in several legal proceedings arising from her departure from and knowledge of the FLDS community. With assistance from Utah Attorney General Mark Shurtleff, in 2003 Carolyn became the first woman who left an FLDS community to be awarded full custody of all of her children. In 2009, Carolyn Jessop won a child support judgment against Merril Jessop in the approximate amount of $148,000 for support Merril Jessop failed to provide his children between 2003 and 2009 after they fled the FLDS community. As of February 2010, Merril Jessop had still not paid any of the child support he owed, and according to Carolyn Jessop's attorney, Natalie Malonis, Merril Jessop's failure to support his children could result in jail time.

In several criminal trials in Texas resulting from the April 2008 seizure of evidence at the YFZ Ranch, Carolyn was called as a witness for the State. In the case of Texas v. Raymond Merril Jessop, Carolyn, Raymond's stepmother, testified about her knowledge of Raymond Jessop as well as her knowledge of church teachings. Raymond Jessop was ultimately convicted of sexual assault of a child and sentenced to 10 years in prison. Carolyn also testified for the State of Texas in criminal trials against Leroy Jessop and Allan Keate. Leroy Jessop, another of Carolyn's stepchildren, was convicted of sexual assault of a child and sentenced to 75 years in prison. Allan Keate was convicted of sexual assault of a child and sentenced to 33 years in prison.

== Betty Jessop ==
Carolyn's second child, Betty Jessop, turned eighteen in 2007 and returned to the FLDS. As was acknowledged by both parties, Carolyn had to physically force her to leave the FLDS when she was thirteen. Since returning to the FLDS, Betty has openly disputed the claims in Carolyn's book, particularly those alleging that Merril Jessop was abusive, saying, "it just makes me want to laugh." She describes her years outside the sect as traumatic, explaining that public school was a shock and that the task of caring for her siblings fell to her due to her mother's health problems: "With the responsibility landing on me so hard every morning, I was an emotional wreck, and after a while, I hardened into a frazzled bundle of nerves." She added, "I was such a representation of everything [Carolyn] hated so much. I just couldn't deny what was in my heart -- my belief in my religion and my love for my father and my family. I spent four years [in mainstream society], and there is nothing there for me."

== Personal life ==
Jessop currently resides in West Jordan, Utah.

== See also ==
- Dorothy Allred Solomon
- List of former Mormon fundamentalists
- Mormon fundamentalism
