= Erle Whiting =

5th President of The Church of Jesus Christ (Cutlerite)
- April 10, 1955 – August 15, 1958
- Called by: Emery Fletcher
- Predecessor: Emery Fletcher
- Successor: Rupert Fletcher

Personal details
- Born: January 2, 1876; Clitherall, Minnesota, United States
- Died: August 15, 1958 (aged 82); Independence, Missouri, United States
- Resting place: Mound Grove Cemetery
- Spouse(s): Gertrude Blanche Cruzan
- Parents: Isaac Morley Whiting; Sarah Jane Talcott

Ivan Erle Whiting, Sr. (January 2, 1876 – August 15, 1958) was the fifth president of The Church of Jesus Christ (Cutlerite), a branch of the Latter Day Saint movement. His short tenure in office was marred by a dispute between the Independence, Missouri congregation of the church, where he and the church headquarters were located, and the branch at Clitherall, Minnesota, which rejected his election to office and chose Clyde Fletcher from their own congregation as president of the church. When the Independence branch (which was much more numerous) refused to accept this unlawful development, the Minnesota branch broke away under Clyde's leadership as the True Church of Jesus Christ (Cutlerite). A battle between the two branches for church properties and leadership was resolved in the Independence branch's favor by a Minnesota court, and Clyde Fletcher's schismatic sect ceased to exist with his death, when both congregations were reunited under Erle's successor, Rupert Fletcher.

== Early years ==
Erle Whiting was born in Clitherall, Minnesota on 2 January 1876. His father, Isaac Whiting, served as the third president of the Cutlerite church, and he married Blanche Gertrude Cruzan in Clitherall on 19 October 1910.

== Presidency ==
Whiting succeeded to the presidency of the Cutlerite church upont he death of his predecessor, Emery Fletcher, in 1955. Ever since a majority of Cutlerites had relocated to Independence in the 1920s, living there in a much more urban environment than in rural Clitherall, differences had arisen between the two congregations. According to Whiting's successor Rupert Fletcher, author of Alpheus Cutler and The Church of Jesus Christ (a history of the Cutlerite church), the schism that led to the founding of Clyde Fletcher's church was precipitated by what he called "the lack of communication and a wide difference in environment." While the Minnesota congregation were primarily "members of a rural society, engaged in agrarian pursuits," the Missourians lived and worked "in an urban community." "The problems and needs of each have little in common with the other", wrote Fletcher, and this had often "caused disunity."

Matters came to a head in April 1955, when Erle was elected by the Independence congregation (which held the majority of Cutlerites) to succeed Emory Fletcher. While the Independence church held that this was in keeping with Cutlerite tradition—which passed the office of Church President down to the predecessor's First Counselor—the Minnesota group insisted that Clyde Fletcher was the true President. Fletcher excommunicated the leaders of the Missouri congregation for refusing to follow his leadership. The Missouri Culterites refused to accept this act as legitimate, or Fletcher's election to the presidency by a minority of the total Cutlerite membership.

Fletcher subsequently insisted that his was the sole true continuation of Alpheus Cutler's organization, and began styling his church the "True Church of Jesus Christ." The two congregations fought over various church properties in or around Clitherall. In 1966 a Minnesota court ruled that the Missouri group was the legitimate Cutlerite church, and was entitled to exclusive control over all properties and records, including the Clitherall meetinghouse. Prior to this ruling, the meetinghouse had been serving as Fletcher's church headquarters and sole branch. Following Fletcher's death in 1969, the other members of his organization reunited with the Independence church, and the True Church of Jesus Christ ceased to exist.

Erle Whiting died on August 15, 1958, long before the schism issues described above were settled.
