= Clitherall =

Clitherall may refer to a community in the United States:

- Clitherall, Minnesota
- Clitherall Lake, a lake in Minnesota
- Clitherall Township, Otter Tail County, Minnesota
