= Emery Fletcher =

4th President of The Church of Jesus Christ (Cutlerite)
- May 28, 1922 – July 21, 1953
- Called by: Isaac Whiting
- Predecessor: Isaac Whiting
- Successor: Erle Whiting

Personal details
- Born: July 22, 1868; Clitherall, Minnesota, United States
- Died: July 21, 1953 (aged 84); Battle Lake, Minnesota, United States
- Resting place: Mt. Pleasant Cemetery
- Spouse(s): Ethel Florence Minton; Emily Augusta Whiting
- Parents: Joseph Edmund Fletcher; Sarah Louisa Muir

Emery George Fletcher (July 22, 1868 - July 21, 1953) was a Latter Day Saint leader who served as the fourth president of The Church of Jesus Christ (Cutlerite), succeeding Isaac Whiting in that office after Whiting died in 1922. During his tenure, the Cutlerites fulfilled a long-cherished dream of their founder, Alpheus Cutler, by relocating their church headquarters from Clitherall, Minnesota (where it had been since 1865) to Independence, Missouri, within sight of the Temple Lot. However, this move had the unintended consequence of commencing a division between the Minnesota and Missouri branches of the church, which led to a short-lived schism after Fletcher's death.

== Early years ==
Fletcher was born in Clitherall, Minnesota, on 22 July 1868. He married Ethel Florence Minton in Fergus Falls and had four children with her. Following her death in 1908, he married Emily Augusta Whiting on 18 April 1915 in Clitherall, but this marriage produced no children.

== Moving to Zion ==
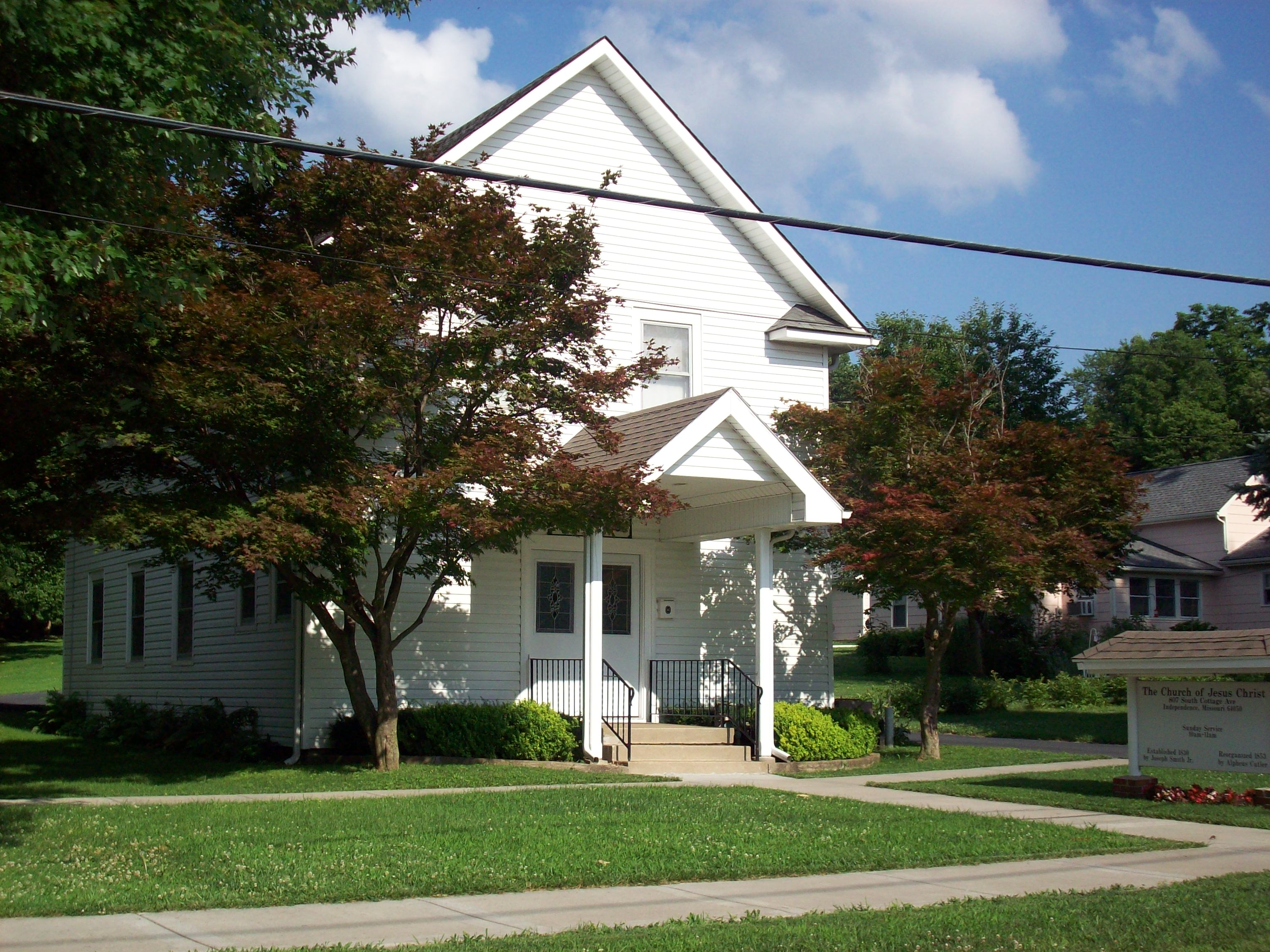
Headquarters and meetinghouse of the Cutlerite church in Independence, Missouri, built during the presidency of Emery Fletcher in the 1920s

Before 1920, there had only been one Cutlerite congregation in Clitherall. However, during the early 1920s, a majority of this congregation elected to relocate to Independence, Missouri, near the Temple Lot, where they purchased land and erected a building which became their new church headquarters.

Independence was an urban environment, in sharp contrast to rural Clitherall. According to Rupert Fletcher, president of the Cutlerite church from 1958 to 1974 and author of Alpheus Cutler and The Church of Jesus Christ, the schism that would lead to the founding of the so-called True Church of Jesus Christ (Cutlerite) after Emery's death was precipitated by what Rupert (Emery Fletcher's son, and a later president of the Cutlerite church) called "the lack of communication and a wide difference in environment." Whereas the Minnesota congregation were primarily "members of a rural society, engaged in agrarian pursuits," the Missouri members lived and worked "in an urban community." "The problems and needs of each have little in common with the other", wrote he, and this often "caused disunity." However, following the death of "True Church" founder Clyde Fletcher, this schism was rapidly healed, and the Cutlerite people reunited around the leadership of then-president Rupert Fletcher (Emery's son).

Fletcher died on 21 July 1953, one day before what would have been his eighty-fifth birthday. He is buried in Clitherall with several other early Cutlerite pioneers in the Mt. Pleasant Cemetery.

== Children ==
All of Emery Fletcher's children were by his first wife, Ethel Minton:

- Nellie
- Elmer Claude
- Rupert J., who would later serve as president of the Cutlerite church
- Neil George
