= Julian Whiting =

7th President of The Church of Jesus Christ (Cutlerite)
- November 22, 1974 – April 30, 1997
- Called by: Rupert Fletcher
- Predecessor: Rupert Fletcher
- Successor: Stanley Whiting

Personal details
- Born: September 7, 1912; Helena, Montana, United States
- Died: October 3, 2004 (aged 92); Independence, Missouri, United States
- Resting place: Mound Grove Cemetery; 39.1128°N 94.4281°W
- Spouse(s): Violet Marie Vargason
- Parents: Julian Everson Whiting; Amy Louisa Gentzler

Julian Everson Whiting (7 September 1912 - 3 October 2004) was a Latter Day Saint leader who served as the seventh president of The Church of Jesus Christ (Cutlerite) from 1974 to 1997. During his tenure, the Cutlerites endured the second (and last, to date) schism in their history when Eugene O. Walton, a convert to the church, proclaimed himself to be the "One Mighty and Strong" in 1980. Walton's attempt to have the Cutlerite church recognize his claim was foiled when the vast majority of Cutlerites, led by Whiting, rejected Walton's purported revelation authorizing his alleged new title.

== Early years ==
Whiting was born on 7 September 1912 in Helena, Montana. His father, who had the same name as his, was an agent for the Great Northern Railway in Wolf Creek, Montana. When Julian was two years old, his family relocated to the main Cutlerite settlement in Clitherall, Minnesota (where his father had grown up), where his father worked a farm and managed a general store in town. Whiting's mother was Amy Gentzler Whiting, originally from Creighton, Nebraska.

After leaving school, Julian moved in 1933 to Independence, Missouri, where the church had relocated its headquarters five years before. There, he worked as an electrical contractor and ultimately became co-owner of Galaxie Electric Co. He obtained a private pilot's license, and aviation became his principal hobby. Julian married Violet Marie Whiting, and they became the parents of three children.

== Presidency ==
Julian Whiting succeeded to the Cutlerite presidency in 1974, upon the death of Rupert Fletcher. During this timeframe the Cutlerite church attracted several new members, one of whom was Eugene Walton, a former member of the RLDS church who had left that denomination due to a perceived increase in liberalism within it. Enthusiastically received at first by Whiting and the other members of the church, Walton shocked his new brethren in 1980 with his claim to be "The One Mighty and Strong" foretold by Joseph Smith in Doctrine and Covenants Section 85 (Utah edition). When Whiting and the majority of Cutlerites refused to endorse this claim, Walton and two of his associates resigned their membership and started the Restored Church of Jesus Christ, which became defunct with Walton's death in 2010.

In 1997, Whiting resigned his presidency due to advancing age. He died on 3 October 2004, and is buried with his wife in Mound Grove Cemetery in Independence.

== Children ==
Julian and Violet ("Ilo") Whiting had three children:

- Stanley E., who succeeded him in the president's office
- Daryl J.
- Mary E.
