= Chancey Whiting =

American Latter Day Saint leader (1819–1902)

Chancey Whiting, Sr.

2nd President of The Church of Jesus Christ (Cutlerite)
- June 30, 1867 – June 7, 1902
- Called by: Alpheus Cutler
- Predecessor: Alpheus Cutler
- Successor: Isaac Whiting

Personal details
- Born: August 19, 1819; Portage County, Ohio, United States
- Died: June 7, 1902 (aged 82); Clitherall, Minnesota, United States
- Resting place: Mt. Pleasant Cemetery; 46.269°N 95.656°W
- Spouse(s): Editha Ann Whiting
- Parents: Elisha Whiting; Sally Hullet

Chancey Whiting, Sr. (19 August 1819 – 7 June 1902) was a Latter Day Saint leader who served as the second president of The Church of Jesus Christ (Cutlerite) from 1864 to 1902, following the death of Cutlerite founder Alpheus Cutler. During his tenure, the Cutlerites (as they had come to be called) relocated from Manti, Iowa, to Clitherall, Minnesota, in response to an alleged vision seen by Cutler prior to his death.

== Early years ==
Whiting was born on 19 August 1819 in Portage County, Ohio, the fifth child and second son of Elisha Whiting, a wagon maker and veteran of the War of 1812, and Sally Hulet. His family were early converts to the Church of Christ (Latter Day Saints), founded by Joseph Smith, who had founded the church after publishing the Book of Mormon in 1830. Accompanying his family and other Latter Day Saints to Caldwell County, Missouri, in 1836, Whiting was expelled from the state with other Mormons in 1838, following the issuance of the so-called "Extermination Order" by governor Lilburn Boggs.

== Following Alpheus Cutler ==
Setting in Adams County, Illinois, Whiting and his family initially followed the leadership of Brigham Young and the Quorum of Twelve Apostles after the murder of Joseph Smith in 1844. However, once Alpheus Cutler made the decision to leave Young's organization, Whiting chose to follow him and settled in Manti, Iowa, with other Cutlerites. Here he became Second Counselor in Cutler's newly formed Church of Jesus Christ, which Cutler "reorganized" in 1853.

== Cutlerite leadership ==
Following Cutler's death in 1864, preceded by the defection of his designated successor Thaddeus Cutler to the rival "New Organization" headed by Joseph Smith's son Joseph Smith III, Chancey Whiting was chosen to succeed as president of Cutler's Church of Jesus Christ. He presided over the Cutlerites' move from Iowa to Clitherall, Minnesota, near Battle Lake, where they established the first permanent white settlement in Otter Tail County on 6 May 1865. With the Dakota War having ravaged the region only three years before, and being warned of possible trouble with the Native Americans remaining in the area, Whiting and other church leaders met with local chiefs and made a private treaty to preserve the peace, which neither side ever broke.

Though he was unable to prevent the loss of several church members to RLDS missionaries during the 1870s and 1880s, Whiting managed to hold the remnant of his church together until his death in 1902. He supervised construction of a church and other buildings in Clitherall, and established a church corporation in 1873 to hold and manage church properties.

Whiting died in Clitherall on 7 June 1902. He is remembered today as one of Otter Tail County's leading early residents.
