= Isaac Whiting =

3rd President of The Church of Jesus Christ (Cutlerite)
- June 7, 1902 – May 28, 1922
- Called by: Chancey Whiting
- Predecessor: Chancey Whiting
- Successor: Emery Fletcher

Personal details
- Born: October 1, 1842; Lima, Illinois, United States
- Died: May 28, 1922 (aged 79); Clitherall, Minnesota, United States
- Resting place: Mount Pleasant Cemetery; 46.2690°N 95.6562°W
- Spouse(s): Sarah Jane Talcott
- Parents: Chancey Whiting; Editha Morley

Isaac Morley Whiting (October 1, 1842 – May 28, 1922) was a Latter Day Saint leader who served as the third president of The Church of Jesus Christ (Cutlerite), from 1902 to 1922. During Whiting's tenure, the Cutlerites successfully established an Order of Enoch, as advocated by founding prophet Joseph Smith during the early years of his movement. This Order, which emphasizes communal ownership of property, still functions in the church today.

== Early years ==
Whiting was born on 1 October 1842 in Lima, Illinois, to Chancey Whiting, who was also his predecessor in office in the Cutlerite church. When he was still very young, his family relocated first to Winter Quarters, Nebraska, and later to Manti, Iowa, where his parents joined Mormon leader Alpheus Cutler in forming the Church of Jesus Christ, commonly known as "Cutlerites." He married Sarah Jane Talcott on 24 December 1863, in Manti.

Trained as a wagon-maker, Whiting moved with his family to Clitherall, Minnesota, where he served as First Counselor to his father while he was leader of the Cutlerite community.

== Presidency ==
Whiting succeeded to the presidency of the Cutlerite church in 1902. In 1910, he attempted to re-establish the United Order; previous attempts by the Cutlerites to do this in Manti had failed. By 1912 these endeavors had borne fruit, and a church corporation had taken charge of Cutlerite properties in Clitherall. He continued to serve in his office until his death on 28 May 1922. Whiting also supervised the construction of a new meetinghouse in Clitherall which still stands today, though it is no longer in use.

== Family ==
Whiting and his wife had nine children:

- Charles Llewelyn
- Emily Augusta
- Addie Belle
- Nelson Francis "Frank"
- Rosille
- Ivan Erle
- Julian Everson
- Roy Rockwood
- Daisy Evangeline
