= Rupert Fletcher =

American Latter Day Saint leader

6th President of The Church of Jesus Christ (Cutlerite)
- September 21, 1958 – November 22, 1974
- Called by: Erle Whiting
- Predecessor: Erle Whiting
- Successor: Julian Whiting

Personal details
- Born: May 15, 1896; Clitherall, Minnesota, United States
- Died: November 22, 1974 (aged 78); Independence, Missouri, United States
- Resting place: Mound Grove Cemetery; 39.1128°N 94.4281°W
- Spouse(s): Daisy Evangeline Whiting
- Parents: Emery George Fletcher; Ethel Florence Minton

Rupert J. Fletcher (May 15, 1896 – November 22, 1974) was a Latter Day Saint leader who served as the sixth president of The Church of Jesus Christ (Cutlerite) from 1958 to 1974. As church president, he ended the schism between the church's Missouri congregation and its Minnesota branch, which had seceded from the church in 1955 and called itself the True Church of Jesus Christ (Cutlerite). He also authored, in company with his wife Daisy, a compendium of Cutlerite history and doctrine, entitled Alpheus Cutler and The Church of Jesus Christ.

== Early years ==
Fletcher was born in Clitherall, Minnesota on May 15, 1896. In his early years, he worked on his father's farm and also as a cowboy in Montana before joining the Cutlerite community in Independence, Missouri. Later, he worked as an over-the-road truck driver, and a taxicab driver for Kansas City's Yellow Cab Co. He married Daisy Evangeline Whiting on December 26, 1930, and they became the parents of three children.

== Presidency ==
Fletcher became president of the Missouri branch of the Cutlerite church in 1958, upon the death of his predecessor, Erle Whiting. Three years earlier, the Minnesota congregation had seceded from the church in a dispute over who should occupy the presidential office. The Missouri congregation, where the majority of Cutlerites attended, had elected Erle Whiting as president, in accordance with long-standing Cutlerite traditions which saw the presidency descend to the First Counselor of the previous president when that person died. The Minnesota congregation disagreed, and elected Clyde Fletcher as church president. Rejecting this illegal act, the Missouri majority continued to sustain Whiting, and following his death, they elected Rupert Fletcher to succeed him. After this, the Minnesota group began calling itself "the True Church of Jesus Christ."

The two congregations had fought over possession of church properties and funds; in 1966, a Minnesota court in Fergus Falls found in favor of the Missouri congregation. Following Clyde Fletcher's death in 1969, the remaining members of his Minnesota sect reunited with Fletcher's Missouri congregation, ending the schism.

In 1973, a year before his death, Rupert and Daisy Fletcher co-authored Alpheus Cutler and The Church of Jesus Christ, a compendium of Cutlerite history (by Daisy Fletcher) and doctrine (by Rupert). The book combined several pamphlets and articles Fletcher had written on various theological themes related to Cutlerite teachings.

Rupert Fletcher died on November 22, 1974, in Independence. He is buried in Mound Grove Cemetery, with his wife.

== Children ==
Rupert and Daisy Fletcher had three children:

- David Lee
- Russell Rupert
- Virginia Ruth
