= Church of Jesus Christ (Cutlerite) =

LDS denomination

Coordinates: 39°05′02″N 94°25′36″W

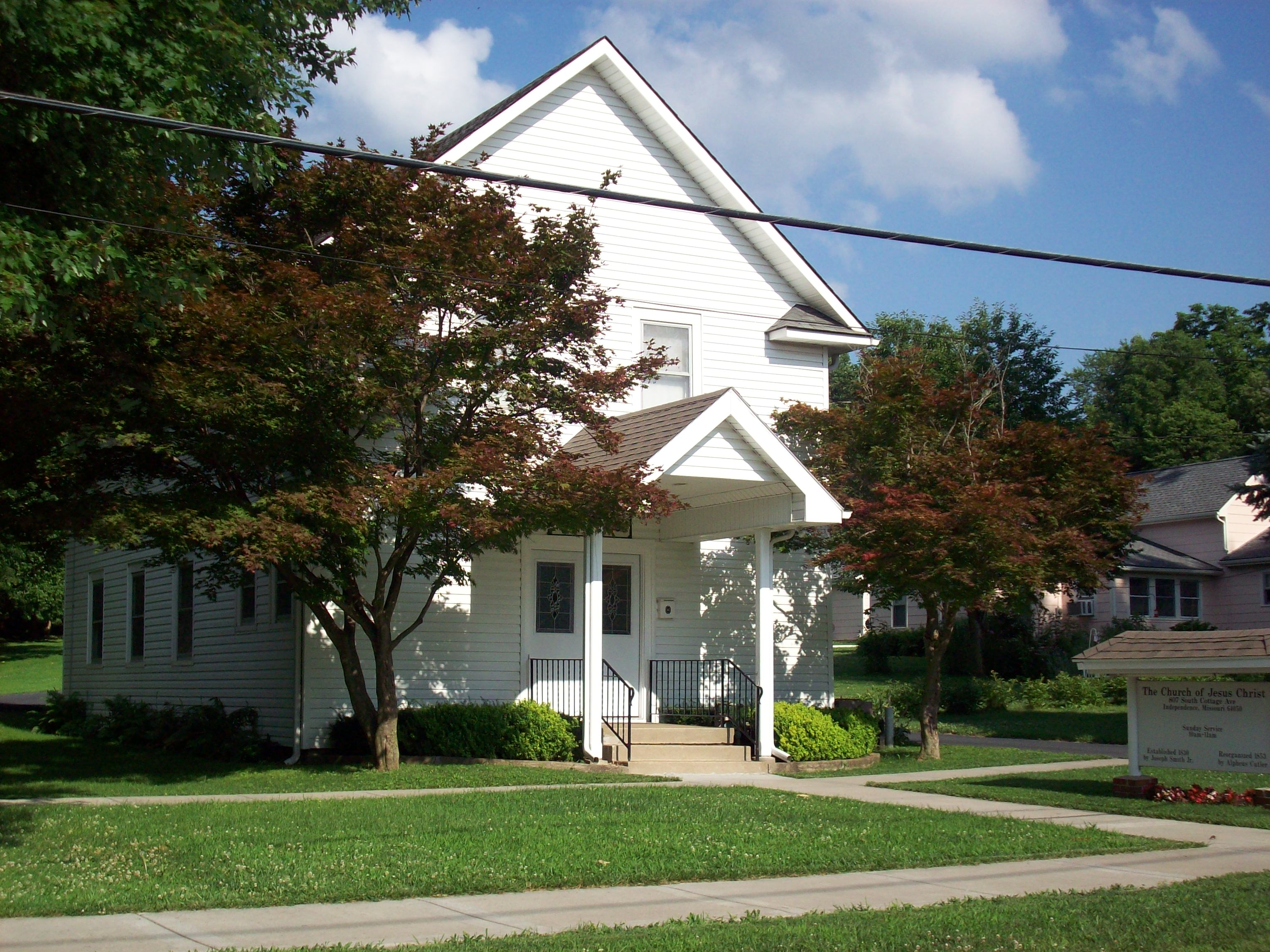
- Cutlerite church headquarters in Independence, Missouri
- Classification: Restorationist
- Orientation: Latter Day Saints
- Polity: Church conference
- Region: United States
- Founder: Alpheus Cutler
- Origin: September 19, 1853 (date of church reorganization)
- Separated from: None, claims to be the sole legitimate continuation of the Church of Christ (Latter Day Saints)
- Separations: True Church of Jesus Christ (Cutlerite); Restored Church of Jesus Christ
- Congregations: 1
- Members: 7 (2026)

The Church of Jesus Christ (Cutlerite) is a denomination of the Latter Day Saint movement headquartered in Independence, Missouri, United States. The church derives its epithet from its founder, Alpheus Cutler, a member of the Nauvoo High Council and of Joseph Smith's Council of Fifty. Cutler justified his establishment of an independent church organization by asserting that God had "rejected" Smith's organization—but not his priesthood—following Smith's death, but that Smith had named Cutler to a singular "Quorum of Seven" in anticipation of this event, with a unique prerogative to reorganize the church that no one beyond this group possessed. Hence, Cutler's organization claims to be the only legitimate Latter Day Saint church in the world today. Currently, it has only one branch, located in Independence. The Cutlerite church retains an endowment ceremony believed to date to the Nauvoo period, practices the United Order of Enoch, and accepts baptism for the dead, but not eternal marriage or polygamy.

== History ==
=== Alpheus Cutler ===
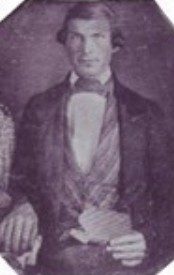
Photo of Alpheus Cutler, founder and first president of the Church of Jesus Christ (Cutlerite)

Alpheus Cutler was a Latter Day Saint leader and contemporary of Joseph Smith who converted to Smith's Church of Christ in January 1833, being baptized in western New York by David W. Patten. Cutler attended Smith's School of the Prophets in Kirtland, Ohio, and assisted in the construction of the Kirtland Temple there. In 1838, during the dedication of cornerstones for the (never-built) Far West Temple, Cutler was named by Smith as "chief architect and master workman of all God's holy houses". Cutler was later appointed a member of the Nauvoo Temple construction committee, after enduring the expulsion of the Latter Day Saints from Missouri. In Nauvoo, he served on the High Council, and was named to Smith's Council of Fifty. Prior to Smith's murder in 1844, Cutler was called on a mission to the "Lamanites" (as Native Americans were often called by the Saints). However, he had not yet departed when Smith was assassinated on June 27 at the jail in Carthage, Illinois.

Smith's death produced a profound leadership crisis in his movement, with members torn between competing claimants for Smith's prophetic mantle. These included Smith's Quorum of the Twelve, led by Brigham Young; James Strang, a newly baptized convert; and Sidney Rigdon, who had served as Smith's First Counselor in the First Presidency. At first, Cutler threw in his lot with the Twelve. He continued to work on the Nauvoo Temple, where he was allegedly "sealed" to his spouse Lois on February 14, 1846, having received his endowment on October 12, 1843, prior to Smith's death. LDS Church records indicate that Cutler was sealed to six other women during this timeframe, but members of his church adamantly deny this or any assertion that Cutler—or Smith, for that matter—approved of or practiced plural marriage. Cutler would later insist that the temple had not been finished by the "sufficient time" given in the revelation authorizing its construction; this proved pivotal for his own claims to legitimacy when he chose to start his own church organization.

=== Breaking with the Twelve ===
When Brigham Young decided to commence the Saints' trek to the Salt Lake Valley, he appointed Cutler as Captain of "Emigrating Company No. 3," one of twenty-five such travelling units into which the Mormon pioneers were organized. Cutler established Cutler's Park, Nebraska in 1846, and was appointed presiding member of the municipal High Council on August 9 of that year. Barely one month later, he was asked to find a new location for a settlement; on September 11, he selected the site that would become Winter Quarters.

Sometime prior to 1849, Cutler made a decision to withdraw from the main church body under the Twelve, and to go his own way. In the fall of 1847, Young had sanctioned his request to conduct the mission work among the Indians to which Joseph Smith had assigned him, and Cutler had commenced his efforts with nearby tribes. All seemed well at first. However, the arrival of apostle Orson Hyde at nearby Kanesville, Iowa in early 1848 changed the situation. Cutler became the subject of lurid rumors concerning his Indian mission, with spurious reports indicating that he had been elected as the "Generalissimo" of a union of "thirty-seven nations". Further tales of alleged disloyalty to the Twelve by Cutler among the "Lamanites" fueled the fire; a visit by Ezra T. Benson, George A. Smith and others to Cutler's mission only partially calmed the situation. Although Young wrote to Cutler, offering him aid to move west, a house in Salt Lake City and a warm welcome once he arrived, the "Old Fox" (as Cutler was affectionately called) refused to go.

Hyde ultimately became convinced that Cutler considered himself to be a greater authority than the council over which he (Hyde) presided, and ordered his mission suspended. Insisting that Cutler had become an enemy to Young's organization, the Kanesville High Council excommunicated him on April 20, 1851. Young labored to bring Cutler back into the fold, writing of an ardent desire to see his old friend and promising him protection against any enemies he might have in the church. Even as late as 1856, long after Cutler had founded his own organization, Young indicated to LDS Church general authorities that he would forgive everything if Cutler would only come to Utah.

=== Iowa and Minnesota ===
But Cutler had no intention of going to Utah. Having broken with Young's organization, he set about creating his own. Having been forced to abandon his mission in 1851 under pressure from local Indian Agents and government authorities, Cutler and his followers relocated to Manti, Iowa, in the southwestern part of that state. On September 19, 1853, Cutler organized The Church of Jesus Christ, claiming that he had seen a special celestial sign (two crescent-moons with their backs together) which Joseph Smith had allegedly told him to wait for before commencing this "reorganization" of the church. From the beginning, Cutler claimed that Smith's church had been "rejected" by God for its alleged "trangrassions", and that only he possessed the power to reorganize it. Thus, claimed Cutler, his new organization was the sole legitimate continuance of Smith's work.

According to Cutler, the misdeed that brought about the rejection of Smith's church was its failure to complete the Nauvoo Temple within the "sufficient time" mentioned in Doctrine and Covenants 124:31-32; Smith's church had accordingly ceased to exist as a legitimate entity. This did not mean that Smith's restored priesthood had been withdrawn from the earth, said Cutler, for he viewed the church and the priesthood as two separate things. While the former had been rejected, said he, the latter had not, and now remained solely with him as the seventh and final member of a furtive "Quorum of Seven" appointed by Smith to carry on his authority independently of the rejected church. All previous members of this quorum had died or apostatized, said Cutler; hence, he and he alone possessed power to "reorganize" Smith's church.

While in Manti, the Cutlerite church attained its highest membership figure: 183 persons. The church endeavored to establish a United Order in Manti, but this attempt failed. Furthermore, Manti was being visited during this period by missionaries from the Reorganized Church, a rival group that accepted the leadership of Smith's eldest son, Joseph Smith III. Many Cutlerites chose to accept "young Joseph", and joined his organization; among them was Cutler's son, Thaddeus. On August 10, 1864, shortly after Cutler's death, those members of his church who had remained loyal to him relocated to Clitherall and Freedhem, Minnesota, in response to an alleged vision. RLDS Church evangelists followed the Cutlerites to their new home and culled many more from their ranks, ultimately leaving Cutler's church with a mere three elders and a few members. The remaining Cutlerites refused to give up, however, constructing a new church building in Clitherall and establishing a church corporation in 1912 to finally effect the ideals of Joseph Smith's United Order.

=== Moving to Independence and recent history ===
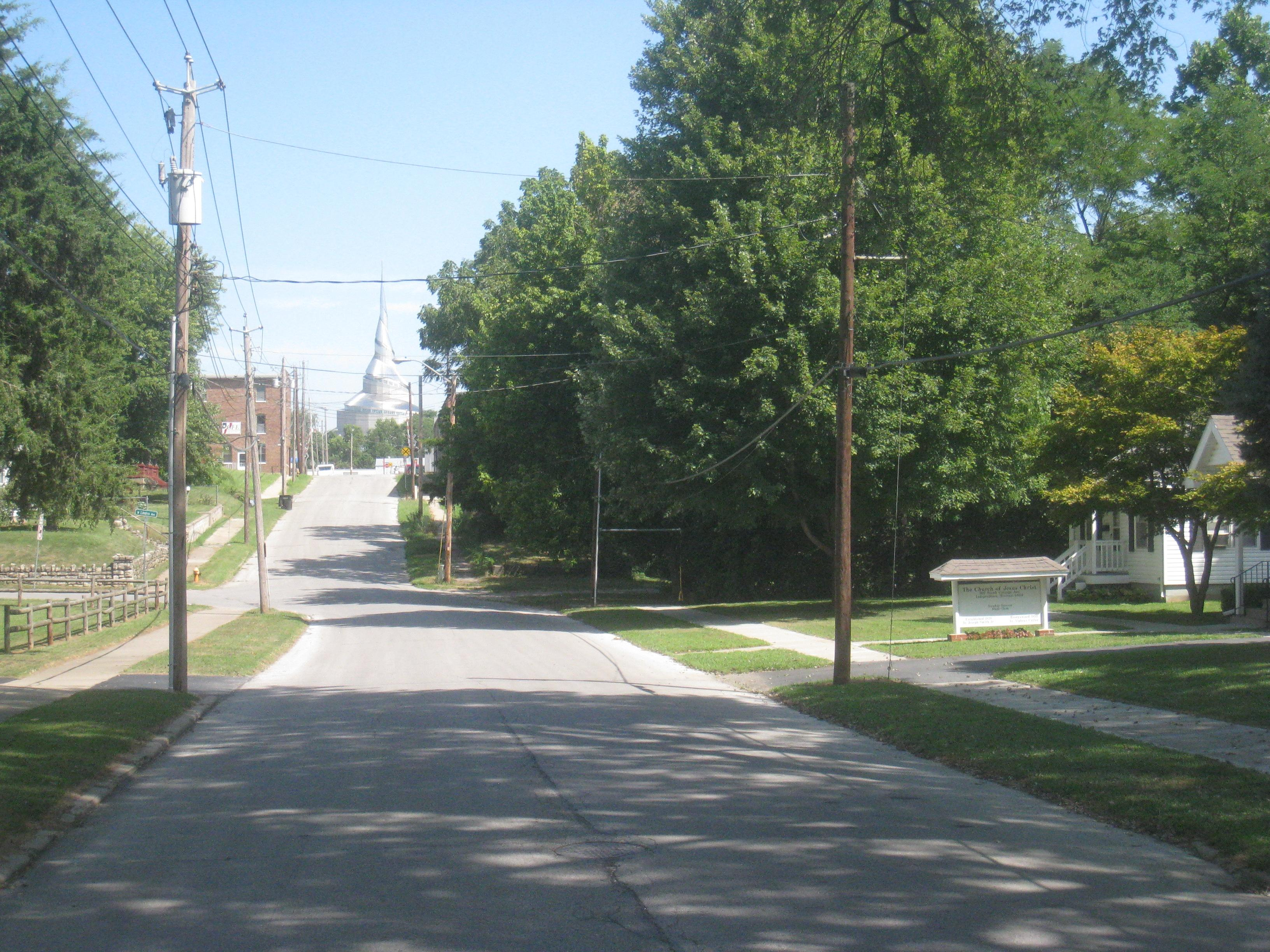
Street view north of the Cutlerite church property in Independence, Missouri, showing relative proximity to the Community of Christ Temple. The Cutlerite church porch is barely visible to the right of their church sign.

In 1928, a portion of the Cutlerite remnant moved to Independence, where they built their present headquarters close to the Temple Lot and were gradually joined by nearly all of the other members. The Cutlerite settlement in Clitherall was ultimately abandoned, though the meetinghouse and some of the homes remain church property to this day. Schisms rent the diminutive group in 1953 and 1980; the former began as a dispute over succession in the presidency following the death of Emery Fletcher in 1953. The Minnesota congregation did not agree with the subsequent succession of Erle Whiting to the office of Church President, and selected Clyde Fletcher as their leader, instead. Fletcher's organization, called the True Church of Jesus Christ (Cutlerite), remained identical to its Independence counterpart in all respects except for its leadership and ceased to exist upon Fletcher's death in 1969, which healed the schism.

The 1980 schism came about when the church rejected the claims of former member Eugene O. Walton, who claimed to be "The One Mighty and Strong" prophesied by Joseph Smith. Walton left that year and founded the Restored Church of Jesus Christ, which differs substantially with its parent organization on several points of doctrine.

The Cutlerites do not conduct missionary work or actively solicit converts, because they believe that God rejected the "Gentiles" following the death of Joseph Smith, and thus there can be no more active missionary work among them (as is done in the LDS Church and other Latter Day Saint churches). Membership was listed at 22 in 1957, and has declined further since then.

== Doctrines ==
=== Church organization ===
As in most Latter Day Saint sects, Cutlerite church organization entails a presidency consisting of a prophet-president and two counselors; when a Cutlerite prophet dies, his First Counselor succeeds to his office subject to the "common consent" of the membership. All other offices of the Melchizedek and Aaronic priesthoods are accepted, including apostle, patriarch, high priest, elder, bishop, priest, teacher, and deacon, though not all are filled in the current organization due to its extremely small numbers. All priesthood offices in the church are limited to males.

=== Priesthood and the church ===
Cutlerites hold a unique view of the relationship between the priesthood and the church. They say that since the priesthood was restored to Joseph Smith in 1829, prior to his organization of the church on April 6, 1830, the priesthood can exist on earth without the church as it did between 1829 and 1830. However, the church can never exist without the priesthood—a belief held by practically all other Latter Day Saint churches today.

This idea plays a very important role in Cutlerite conceptions of the Latter Day Saint movement, especially in the period immediately prior to and following the murder of Joseph Smith. Cutlerites point to Doctrine and Covenants 124:31-32, which commands the building of a temple in Nauvoo, and also refers to a "sufficient time" being granted for its construction, followed by the threat of being "rejected as a church, with your dead" if the structure is not completed within the allotted period. While other Mormon factions interpret this passage in varying ways, Cutlerites believe it indicates that if the Nauvoo Temple was not finished within a specific time (which seems never to have been identified with any specific date), then the church organization effected by Smith on April 6, 1830 would be "rejected," and thus cease to be valid in the sight of God. Since the Cutlerites assert that the Nauvoo Temple was never truly completed—an allegation contested by the LDS Church and most other Mormon factions—Cutlerites allege that the Latter Day Saint church existing from 1830 to 1844 was indeed "rejected" by God.

However, Cutler's followers maintain that the demise of Smith's church did not entail the demise of his priesthood. Foreseeing this development, the prophet had provided a means for selected priesthood holders to reorganize his church at an appropriate future time: a "Quorum of Seven." Cutler stated that he was the seventh member of this order; he only identified one other alleged colleague: John Smith, uncle of Joseph Smith, who he said was the sixth. All of the others, said Cutler, had either died or apostatized (including John Smith); thus, Cutler was the only person still possessing authority from Smith to reconstitute the church. Historian D. Michael Quinn has alleged that this Quorum of Seven might have existed as a subcommittee within the Council of Fifty, but the Cutlerites have never advanced any such interpretation or otherwise addressed that particular subject.

=== United Order ===
Cutlerites practice the United Order. They endeavor to replicate, as far as possible, the ideal of "all things common" taught in the early Latter Day Saint church. This replaces the law of tithing taught by most other Mormon factions, and complete participation is required of all members. Cutlerites do not believe that Joseph Smith ever authored the 119th section of the Doctrine and Covenants, which mandates tithing, claiming that it was never presented to the membership until after Smith's death.

=== Temple ordinances ===
The Cutlerites are the only non-LDS Church-derived group of Latter Day Saints who practice the "endowment" ceremony that originated during the Nauvoo period of Mormon history. However, unlike almost all other groups that observe these ordinances, they do not require the construction of a temple edifice to perform them (though Cutlerites believe in the concept of temples). Instead, their meetinghouses are used for this purpose. These follow the pattern of the Nauvoo Temple, with a main-floor room for ordinary church services, a font beneath for baptisms of both the living and for the dead, and a second story above for the "priesthood ordinances", as they term them.

As with the LDS Church ordinances, these ceremonies (and the rooms in which they are performed) are considered especially sacred, and are not open to, or shared with, the public. In contrast with the LDS Church, which allows new members to receive their endowment one year after baptism, Cutlerites generally wait many years before receiving these ordinances. The Cutlerite church also practices baptism for the dead, but not eternal marriage.

=== Scriptures ===
Cutlerites utilize the Inspired Version of the Bible, the Book of Mormon, and the 1846 edition of the Doctrine and Covenants. The latter work includes the "Lectures on Faith," which Cutlerites regard as scripture, as well as the revelations on baptism for the dead. The Pearl of Great Price is not part of Cutlerite scripture, save that portion of it that forms a portion of the Inspired Version of the Bible (the Book of Moses and Joseph Smith—Matthew).

The Book of Abraham is rejected as scripture, as are the LDS Church concepts of eternal progression (whereby God was once a man, and man may become a god), plural marriage, and eternal marriage. Cutlerite concepts of the Godhead mirror those presented in the "Lectures on Faith". The first vision of Joseph Smith is accepted as authentic, though none of Smith's accounts of it are canonized as scripture. The Articles of Faith contained in the LDS Church's Pearl of Great Price are not officially canonized, though they do reflect basic Cutlerite beliefs.

=== Book of Mormon lands ===
While many Latter Day Saints point to Central America as the most likely geographical location for the lands depicted in the Book of Mormon, Cutlerites insist that these were primarily in North America, particularly in the United States.

=== Missionary work ===
Unlike many other Latter Day Saints, Cutlerites do not engage in missionary work. Cutler taught that with the murder of Joseph Smith, the "Gentiles" (non-Native Americans living in America and the world) had rejected Smith's gospel, and thus there was to be no more preaching to them. This does not mean that Cutlerites do not welcome visitors. They simply do not believe in going out to convert others; they feel that God will lead those who are truly interested to them. While Cutlerites do not discourage new members from joining them, they point out the high expectations enjoined by their ideals, and the seriousness of the baptismal commitment.

== Presidents of The Church of Jesus Christ (Cutlerite) ==
President	Born–Died	President from	President until	Comments
Alpheus Cutler	1784–1864	September 19, 1853	October 6, 1864	Former member of Nauvoo High Council; founded church in 1853; died in Manti, Iowa.
Chancey Whiting	1819–1902	June 30, 1864	July 6, 1902	Led relocation to Clitherall, Minnesota; built first permanent settlement in Otter Tail County.
Isaac Whiting	1842–1922	July 6, 1902	May 28, 1922	Successfully reestablished Order of Enoch, as in the early years of Joseph Smith's church.
Emery Fletcher	1868–1953	May 28, 1922	July 21, 1953	Moved headquarters to Independence, Missouri in 1928.
Erle Whiting	1876–1958	October 4, 1955	June 18, 1958	His succession led to short-lived schism under Clyde Fletcher.
Rupert Fletcher	1896–1974	June 18, 1958	November 22, 1974	Authored Alpheus Cutler and The Church of Jesus Christ, a compendium of history and doctrine.
Julian Whiting	1912–2004	November 22, 1974	March 10, 2004	Deflected 1980 effort by Eugene Walton to declare himself the "One Mighty and Strong."
Stanley Whiting	1934–2011	March 10, 2004	April 18, 2011	Son of Julian Whiting.
Vernon Whiting	1934–2024	April 18, 2011	October 17, 2024	Cousin to Stanley Whiting.
Ronald Lane	1939–	October 17, 2024		Married Virginia Fletcher, daughter of Rupert Fletcher.

== Media ==
- Church of Jesus Christ (Cutlerite) Meetinghouse, located in Clitherall, Minnesota. Another photo of the Clitherall meetinghouse. Originally built by the church in 1912, this building was used by for Clyde Fletcher's True Church of Jesus Christ (Cutlerite) from 1953–69, but was never the legal property of that organization.
- Historic photos of Clitherall, Minnesota. A selection of historical and modern photographs of Clitherall, Minnesota, which was founded by the Cutlerites in 1864. The Cutlerites maintained a presence here until the early 1990s, and still own their old meetinghouse, though it is no longer used.
- Manti, Iowa. Contains information and a few modern photos of the old Cutlerite cemetery and settlement in Manti, Iowa, which was founded by Alpheus Cutler in 1851. The Cutlerites remained there until 1864, when they relocated to Clitherall, Minnesota. Also includes a map of the town.
