= Alpheus Cutler =

Mormon leader (1784–1864)

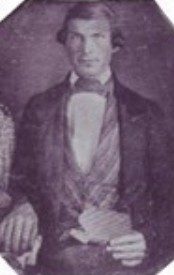
- Photo of Alpheus Cutler

1st President of The Church of Jesus Christ (Cutlerite)
- September 19, 1853 – June 10, 1864
- Called by: Joseph Smith
- Predecessor: Joseph Smith
- Successor: Chancey Whiting

Personal details
- Born: John Alpheus Cutler; February 29, 1784; Plainfield, New Hampshire, United States
- Died: June 10, 1864 (aged 80); Manti, Iowa, United States
- Resting place: Manti Cemetery; 40.723°N 95.399°W
- Spouse(s): Lois Lathrop
- Children: 10
- Parents: Knight Cutler; Elizabeth Boyd

John Alpheus Cutler (February 29, 1784 – June 10, 1864) was an early leader in the Latter Day Saint movement who founded the Church of Jesus Christ (Cutlerite) in 1853. He had previously served in several church positions under Joseph Smith, founder of the Latter Day Saint movement, as well as captain of Smith's personal bodyguard and "Master Builder and Workman on all God's Holy Houses." Following the death of Joseph Smith in June 1844, Cutler at first followed the Twelve Apostles under Brigham Young, but later left Young's church to reorganize the Church of Jesus Christ, with himself serving as its first president. Cutler claimed that this was the sole legitimate continuation of Smith's organization, and he served as its leader until his death.

== Early years ==
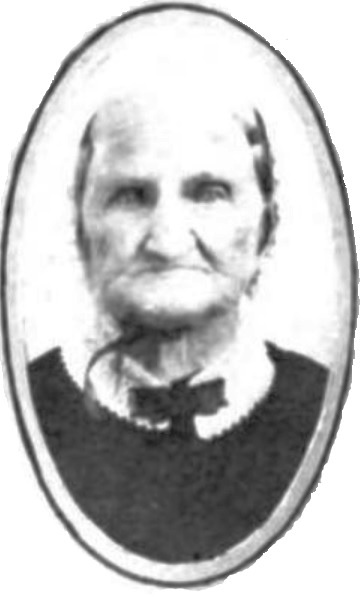
Lois Lathrop Cutler, wife

Cutler was born in Plainfield, New Hampshire, to Knight Cutler, a veteran of the American Revolution, and Elizabeth Boyd. He married Lois Lathrop of Lebanon, New Hampshire, on November 17, 1808. Lathrop was a descendant of Rev. John Lothropp (1584–1653), and thus a distant cousin of Latter Day Saint prophet Joseph Smith. Cutler fought as a private in the War of 1812, serving in Cpt. E. Smith's company of New York Militia from September to December 1812. Although later Latter Day Saint sources would refer to Cutler as "Captain Alpheus Cutler" and say that he had fought at the battles of Chippewa Falls and Lundy's Lane, his service record does not support either assertion.

Cutler was a stonemason by occupation. He stood over six feet tall, and was described by one biographer as being "heavy set," "powerfully built," "critical" and "sarcastic," while generally expressing himself in "an extremely candid, sharp and brusque manner." Some of Cutler's contemporaries would later refer to him as having a "natural parabolical, allegorical, symbolical, mysterious, secretive way of telling things."

== Conversion to the Latter Day Saint movement ==
Following the War of 1812, Cutler and his family were living in western New York, where they heard David W. Patten of the Church of Christ preach about the coming forth of the Book of Mormon and the ministry of Joseph Smith. Following what they claimed to be a miraculous cure of their daughter by Patten's prayers and laying on of hands, Cutler and his family were baptized by Patten on 20 January 1833. He moved to the main Mormon settlement at Kirtland, Ohio, the following year.

An enthusiastic convert, Cutler was invited to attend Smith's School of the Prophets in Kirtland, and assisted in the construction of the Kirtland Temple there. Although brought before the Kirtland High Council on 15 March 1835 on charges of arguing with fellow member Reynolds Cahoon and complaining about not being paid enough for his work on the temple, Cutler weathered the storm and remained in Smith's good graces. During the building's dedication on 27 March 1836, Cutler claimed to have seen a vision of Jesus Christ descending down a long carpet into the temple; he claimed that Christ spoke to him, but did not record what he said. He also claimed in this vision to have seen a large gold chain draped across the newly completed edifice.

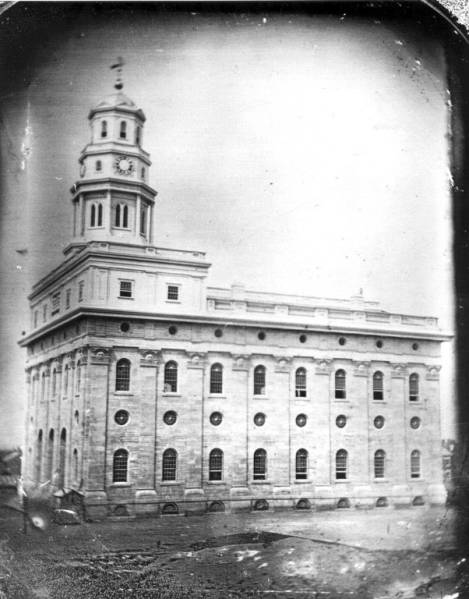
The Nauvoo Temple, which Cutler helped to design and build.

When Joseph Smith moved church headquarters to Caldwell County, Missouri, in 1837, Cutler followed him there and settled in adjacent Ray County. A victim of Governor Lilburn Boggs's "Extermination Order," Cutler was expelled from the state with the other Latter Day Saints during the winter of 1838–39. Together with members of the Quorum of Twelve Apostles and other leading Latter Day Saints, Cutler risked death and slipped back into Far West, where as the newly named "chief architect and master workman of all God's holy houses", Cutler laid the cornerstone for the (never-built) Far West Temple.

Relocating with his religious brethren to Nauvoo, Illinois, Cutler was appointed one of three members of a committee to oversee construction of the Nauvoo Temple on 3 October 1840. Directed to supervise the cutting of timber for the new edifice, Cutler led a group of workmen into the Pineries along the Black River in Wisconsin, where they spent the next year cutting logs and floating them down the Mississippi River to Nauvoo.

While in Nauvoo, Cutler served on the Nauvoo High Council, and the Anointed Quorum; he was also named to Joseph Smith's Council of Fifty. Cutler received his endowment under Smith's hand on 12 October 1843, and subsequently became only the sixth person to be given the rare Second Anointing on 15 November—a full week before Brigham Young received his—which made him a "King and Priest" in Smith's still-secret Kingdom of God (see Council of Fifty). Cutler also served as captain of Smith's bodyguard.

Prior to Smith's murder in 1844, Cutler was called by Smith to undertake a mission to the "Lamanites" (as Native Americans were often called by the Saints during this time in history). However, he had not yet departed when Smith was killed on 27 June at the jail in Carthage, Illinois. Cutler was a pallbearer at Smith's funeral.

== Events of 1844–51 ==
=== Cutler remains in Nauvoo ===
Smith's death produced a profound succession crisis in his movement, with members torn between competing claimants for Smith's prophetic mantle. These included the Quorum of the Twelve, led by Brigham Young; James Strang, a newly baptized convert from Wisconsin; and Sidney Rigdon, who had served as Joseph Smith's First Counselor in the First Presidency.

At first, Cutler threw in his lot with the Twelve. He continued to work on the Nauvoo Temple, where he was reportedly "sealed" to Lois on 14 February 1846. LDS Church records indicate that Cutler was married to six other women during this timeframe, but the Cutlerite church adamantly denies this or any assertion that Cutler—or Joseph Smith, for that matter—approved of or practiced plural marriage. Although the Nauvoo Temple would be dedicated on 1 May 1846 by apostle Orson Hyde, Cutler would later insist that it had not been finished by the "sufficient time" given in the revelation authorizing its construction; this proved pivotal for his own claims to legitimacy when he decided to commence his own church organization in 1853.

At this point, however, Cutler's loyalties were clearly with Brigham Young; he participated as a member of the High Council in the excommunication trials of Rigdon and Strang, as well as Joseph Smith's own brother, William, who had publicly endorsed Strang. During a discussion over the competing succession claims in the High Council, Cutler indicated that he "felt bound to sustain the Twelve, and all the Quorums of the Church with its present organization, for on that his salvation depended."

=== Winter Quarters ===
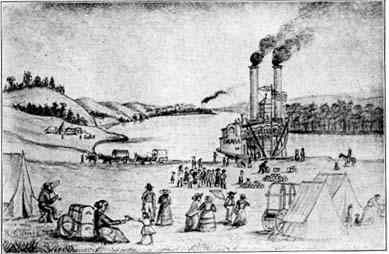
Cutler's Park, founded by Alpheus Cutler, in the late 1840s.

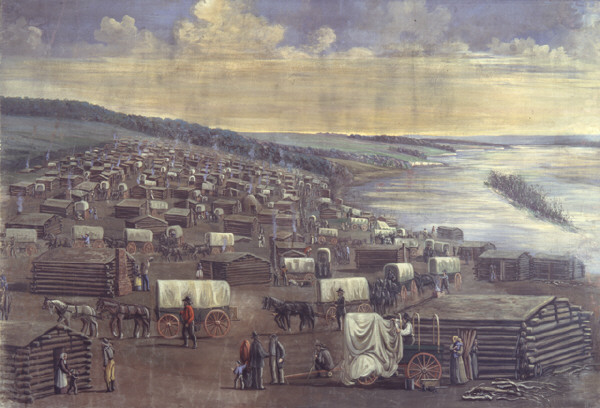
Winter Quarters, Nebraska, founded by Alpheus Cutler

When Brigham Young decided to commence the Saints' trek to the Salt Lake Valley, he appointed Cutler as Captain of "Emigrating Company No. 3," one of twenty-five such travelling units into which the Mormon pioneers were organized. Cutler established Cutler's Park, Nebraska, in 1846, and was appointed presiding member of the municipal High Council on 9 August of that year. Barely a month later, he was asked to find a new location for a settlement; on 11 September he selected the site that would become Winter Quarters, Nebraska.

=== Trouble begins ===
Sometime prior to 1849, Cutler made a decision to withdraw from the main church body under the Twelve, and to go his own way. In the fall of 1847, Brigham Young had sanctioned his request to conduct the mission work among the Indians to which Joseph Smith had assigned him, and Cutler had commenced his efforts with nearby tribes. All seemed well at first. However, the arrival of apostle Orson Hyde at nearby Kanesville, Iowa, in early 1848 changed the situation. Cutler soon became the subject of lurid rumors concerning his Indian mission, with spurious reports indicating that he had been elected as the "Generalissimo" of a union of "thirty-seven nations". Further allegations of disloyalty to the Twelve by Cutler among the "Lamanites" fueled the fire; a visit by Ezra T. Benson, George A. Smith and others to Cutler's mission only partially calmed the situation. Although Brigham Young wrote to Cutler, offering him aid to move west, a house in Salt Lake City and a warm welcome once he arrived, the "Old Fox" (as Cutler was affectionately called) refused to go.

According to Cutler biographer Danny Jorgensen, Cutler had been appointed to a committee of the Council of Fifty specializing in "Lamanite" affairs, and he might have seen his mission as ultimately being Council of Fifty business, rather than as church business; thus, his resistance to Hyde and the others' attempts to regulate his activities among the Kansas tribes. However, since the role and place of the Fifty within Joseph Smith's overall scheme of things was not well known to many Latter Day Saints (due in part to its secret nature, and in part to Smith's untimely demise), many Latter Day Saints misunderstood Cutler's intentions and pronouncements on this subject, and this contributed to the eventual severing of his ties with Brigham Young's church.

=== Excommunication ===
Hyde ultimately became convinced that Cutler considered himself to be a greater authority than the council over which he (Hyde) presided, and ordered his mission suspended. Insisting that Cutler had become an enemy to Young's organization, the Kanesville High Council excommunicated him on 20 April 1851. Young labored to bring Cutler back into the fold, writing of an ardent desire to see his old friend and promising him protection against any enemies he might have in the church. Even as late as 1856, long after Cutler had founded his own organization, Young indicated to LDS Church general authorities that he would forgive everything if Cutler would only come to Utah Territory.

== Founding a new church ==
=== The "Cutlerite" reorganization ===
But Cutler had no intention of going to Utah. Having broken with Young's organization, he set about creating his own. Having been forced to abandon his mission in 1851 under pressure from local Indian Agents and government authorities, he and his followers relocated to Manti, Iowa, in the southwestern part of that state. On September 19, 1853, Cutler organized The Church of Jesus Christ, claiming that he had seen a prophesied celestial sign (two crescent-moons with their backs together) which Joseph Smith had allegedly told him to wait for before commencing this "reorganization" of the church. Cutler claimed that Smith's church had been "rejected" by God, and that only he possessed the power to reorganize it. Thus, claimed Cutler, his new organization was the sole legitimate continuance of Joseph Smith's work.

According to Cutler, the misdeed that brought about the rejection of Joseph Smith's church was its failure to complete the Nauvoo Temple within the "sufficient time" mentioned in Doctrine and Covenants 124:31–32; that organization had accordingly ceased to exist as a legitimate entity. This did not mean that Smith's restored priesthood had been withdrawn from the earth, said Cutler, for he viewed the church and the priesthood as two separate things. While the former had been rejected, said he, the latter had not, and now remained solely with him as the seventh and final member of a furtive "Quorum of Seven" appointed by Smith to carry on his authority independently of the rejected church. All previous members of this quorum had died or apostatized, said Cutler; hence, he and he alone possessed power to "reorganize" Smith's church. Historian D. Michael Quinn surmises that this Quorum might have been the same as the so-called "Committee of the Council" or "Committee of Seven" spoken of in documents relating to the Council of Fifty, but questions whether it was ever anything more than a political body within the Council, as opposed to a group with "extraordinary religious or theocratic powers."

Cutler viewed the death of Joseph Smith as the rejection by the "Gentiles" of the restored gospel; as a result, the new sect believed that the gospel was to go to "the Jews and the House of Israel, including the Lamanites (Native Americans)." However, the Cutlerites proselyted to other groups of people regardless.

=== Manti ===
While in Manti, the Cutlerite church attained its highest membership figure: 183 persons. The church endeavored to establish a United Order, but soon gave up the attempt. Cutler became convinced that he was destined to lead a Mormon return to Independence, Missouri, and build there the great temple that the Mormons had tried (and failed, due to intense local opposition) to construct in 1832–33; in an 1861 sermon, Cutler prophesied that he would "be standing in Zion, if he were 80 years old." According to Joseph Smith III, eldest son of Joseph Smith and leader of a rival faction known as the New Organization, Cutler's followers were so convinced that they would be moving to Independence soon that they refused to make substantial improvements to their homes and lands, and remained in a constant state of readiness to leave at a moment's notice for "Zion."

Manti was visited during this period by missionaries from Joseph Smith III's church, now known as the Reorganized Church of Jesus Christ of Latter Day Saints (RLDS Church). These visits began in 1855 with a letter from Zenos Gurley inviting Cutler to join their movement. Cutler rebuffed Gurley's overtures with a tersely-worded letter of his own, in which he openly ridiculed the RLDS Church's claims and insisted that his organization alone was possessed of the true priesthood authority. Nevertheless, many Cutlerites chose to accept "young Joseph;" among them was Cutler's son (and designated successor), Thaddeus. Joseph Smith III visited Cutler in person in 1863; he reported that the once-robust prophet had become partially paralyzed (due to a recent stroke) and weighed nearly 300 pounds; he struggled to speak, Joseph reported, but was no longer able to communicate effectively.

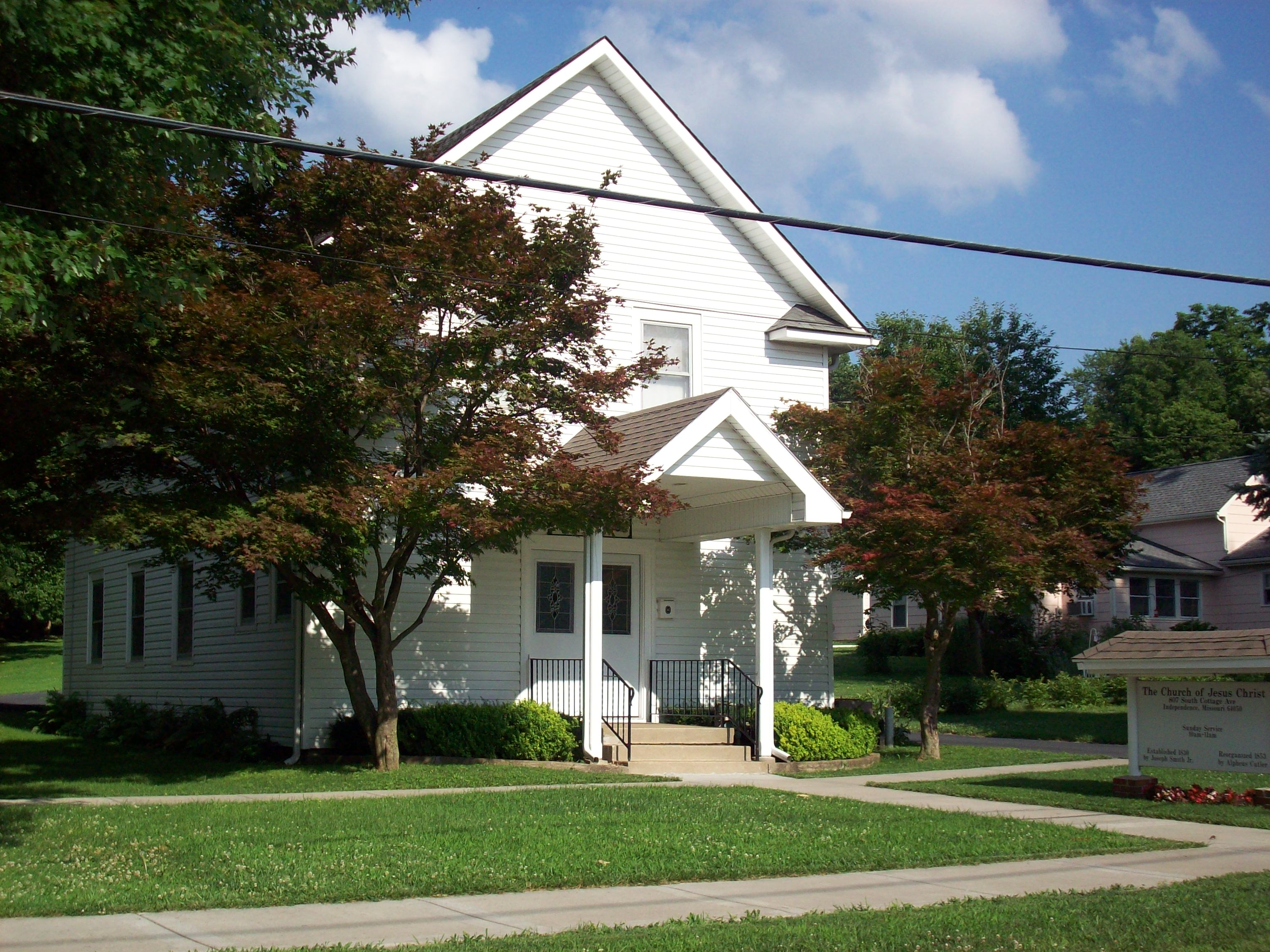
Cutlerite church headquarters in Independence, Missouri

== Death and aftermath ==
Cutler died from complications of pulmonary tuberculosis on 10 June 1864, and is buried in Manti, Iowa.

On 10 August 1864, those members of his church who had remained loyal to Cutler (including his wife, Lois) relocated to Clitherall, near Battle Lake, Minnesota, in response to an alleged vision. RLDS Church evangelists followed the Cutlerites to their new home and culled many more from their ranks, ultimately leaving Cutler's church with a mere three elders and a few members. The remaining Cutlerites refused to give up, however, constructing a new church building in Clitherall and successfully establishing a church corporation in 1912 to effect the ideals of Joseph Smith's United Order; this corporation continues to function today.

During the 1920s, church members began to fulfill Cutler's long-held dream when they relocated their headquarters to Independence, Missouri; there they built a meetinghouse that remains today as the only functioning Cutlerite church building. As Cutler had taught in Manti, his followers continue to perform endowments and baptisms for the dead today, virtually alone among all non–LDS Church-derived Latter Day Saint churches.

Two schisms emerged from the original Cutlerite organization: the first was started by Clyde Fletcher in 1953 and vanished with his death in 1969. The second was begun by former member Eugene Walton in 1980, after the mainline Cutlerite organization rejected his claims to be the "One Mighty and Strong." Cutler's church continues to function today, albeit with diminutive membership numbers (12 members in 2010, all in Independence). Its current president is (as of 2013) Vernon Whiting.

== Wife, alleged plural wives and children ==
Cutler's legal wife (and the only wife Cutlerites will acknowledge him having) was Lois Lathrop, who was born September 24, 1788, in Lebanon, New Hampshire, and remained married to Cutler until his death. She and Cutler had the following children:

- Thaddeus (b. June 18, 1809, in Lisle, Broome Co., N.Y.)
- Libeus (b. 1814 in Ontario, Broome)
- Louisa Elizabeth (b. May 16, 1816, in Lisle, Broome)
- Sally Mavea (b. Sept. 9, 1818 in Lisle, Broome)
- William (b. Feb. 6, 1821 in Ontario, Wayne Co., N.Y.)
- Benjamin Franklin (b. Apr. 13, 1823 in Pomfret, Chatauqua Co., N.Y.)
- Clarissa Crissy (b. Dec. 23, 1824 in Pomfret, Chattauqua)
- Emily Trask (b. Feb. 23, 1828 in Hanover, Chautauqua)
- Edwin H. (b. 1829 in New York)
- Betsy A. (b. 1832 in Pomfret, Chatauqua, N.Y.)

Cutler's daughter Louisa Elizabeth Cutler (1816–1854) married Tunis Rappleye (1807–1883), who led the second group of Mormon pioneers (after Brigham Young's group) into the Salt Lake Valley in 1847. Their marriage produced 10 children and hundreds of descendants. Two other daughters, Clarissa (1824) and Emily (1828), married LDS Church apostle Heber Chase Kimball (1801) as polygamous wives. Both later divorced him.

In addition to his legal wife, Lois, LDS Church records indicate Cutler as having married the following women in 1846:

- Luana Hart Beebe Rockwell (b. Oct. 3, 1814 in Lebanon, Madison, NY; d. Mar. 6, 1897 in West Tintic, Juab Co., UT)
- Margaret Carr (b. 1771 in North Carolina);
- Abigail Carr (b. 1780 in North Carolina);
- Sally Cox Smith Hutchings (b. Feb. 26, 1794 in Bernard, Somerset, NJ; d. Sept. 28, 1863 in Salt Lake City);
- Disey Caroline McCall (b. 1802 in North Carolina);
- Henrietta Clarinda Miller (b. 1822 in New York).

The contemporary Cutlerite church adamantly denies that any of these alleged marriages occurred, or that Cutler ever sanctioned or practiced plural marriage. According to non-Cutlerite biographer Danny L. Jorgensen, Cutler allegedly abandoned his plural wives (and plural marriage altogether) sometime during the 1850s after one of his disciples, F. Walter Cox, was threatened with imprisonment in Iowa. This same biographer also cites Heber C. Kimball's abandonment of Cutler's two daughters as another reason for Cutler's disaffection with polygamy.
