= True Church of Jesus Christ (Cutlerite) =

- Classification: Latter Day Saint movement
- Orientation: Latter Day Saints
- Polity: Defunct as of 1969
- Moderator: Defunct
- Region: United States
- Founder: Clyde Fletcher
- Origin: Founded in 1953; Clitherall, Minnesota
- Separated from: Church of Jesus Christ (Cutlerite)
- Congregations: Defunct
- Members: Fewer than 10

The True Church of Jesus Christ (Cutlerite) was a small Latter Day Saint faction which split from the Church of Jesus Christ (Cutlerite) in 1953 under its founder, Clyde Fletcher, and continued to exist until Fletcher's death in 1969. It was situated in Clitherall, Minnesota—the location of its one and only branch—and remained identical to its parent organization in all respects save leadership. Following Fletcher's death, his few remaining adherents elected to reunite with the main Cutlerite body, and this sect ceased to exist.

== History ==
The True Church of Jesus Christ originated from a schism between the two existing congregations of the Church of Jesus Christ in 1953, following the death of church president Emery Fletcher. Though precipitated by a dispute over who should succeed Fletcher in the presidential office, the division was exacerbated by the differing conditions under which each congregation had operated during the first half of the twentieth century. Prior to 1920, there had only been one Cutlerite congregation, located in Clitherall. However, during the early 1920s, a majority of the Cutlerite congregation elected to relocate to Independence, Missouri near the Temple Lot, where they purchased land and erected a building which became their new church headquarters. Independence was an urban environment, in sharp contrast to rural Clitherall.

According to Rupert Fletcher, president of the Cutlerite church from 1958 to 1974 and author of Alpheus Cutler and the Church of Jesus Christ, the schism that led to the founding of Clyde Fletcher's church was precipitated by what he called "the lack of communication and a wide difference in environment." Whereas the Minnesota congregation were primarily "members of a rural society, engaged in agrarian pursuits," the Missouri members lived and worked "in an urban community." "The problems and needs of each have little in common with the other", wrote Fletcher, and this had often "caused disunity."

Matters came to a head in April 1955, when Erle Whiting was elected by the Independence congregation (which held the majority of Cutlerites) to succeed Emory Fletcher. While the Independence church asserted that this was in keeping with Cutlerite tradition—which passed the office of Church President down to the predecessor's First Counselor—the Minnesota group insisted that Clyde Fletcher was the legitimate President. Fletcher excommunicated the leaders of the Missouri congregation for refusing to follow his leadership. The Missouri Culterites refused to accept this act as legitimate, or Fletcher's election to the presidency by a minority of the total Cutlerite membership.

Fletcher subsequently insisted that his was the sole true continuation of Alpheus Cutler's organization, and began styling his church the "True Church of Jesus Christ." The two congregations fought over various church properties in and around Clitherall. In 1966, a Minnesota court ruled that the Missouri group was the legitimate Cutlerite church, and was entitled to exclusive control over all church properties and records, including the Clitherall meetinghouse. Prior to this ruling, the meetinghouse had been serving as Fletcher's church headquarters and sole branch. Following Fletcher's death in 1969, the remaining members of his organization reunited with the Independence church, and the True Church of Jesus Christ ceased to exist.

The old Cutlerite meetinghouse in Clitherall still stands, and remains the property of the Independence church.

== Doctrines ==
The True Church of Jesus Christ (Cutlerite) followed all of the distinctive teachings of the main Cutlerite organization, including adherence to the United Order and belief in Baptism for the Dead and a Nauvoo-era Temple Endowment. As in the mainline Cutlerite church, polygamy and eternal marriage were rejected. The church utilized the same scriptures utilized by the Cutlerite church in Independence.

== Media ==
- Meetinghouse of the True Church of Jesus Christ (Cutlerite), located in Clitherall, Minnesota. Constructed by the Church of Jesus Christ (Cutlerite) in 1912, it was used by Fletcher's sect, but was never the legal property of that organization. Owned by the Independence Cutlerite church.
