= Clitherall Township, Otter Tail County, Minnesota =

Clitherall Township, Minnesota
- Township
- Location of Clitherall Township, within Otter Tail County, Minnesota

- Location within the state of Minnesota Clitherall Township, Minnesota (the United States)
- Coordinates: 46°14′44″N 95°42′16″W
- Country: United States
- State: Minnesota
- County: Otter Tail

Area
  - Total: 35.7 sq mi (92.4 km^{2})
  - Land: 29.3 sq mi (75.9 km^{2})
  - Water: 6.3 sq mi (16.4 km^{2})
- Elevation: 1,335 ft (407 m)

Population (2020)
  - Total: 495
  - Density: 16.9/sq mi (6.52/km^{2})
- Time zone: UTC-6 (Central (CST))
  - Summer (DST): UTC-5 (CDT)
- ZIP code: 56524
- Area code: 218
- FIPS code: 27-12106
- GNIS feature ID: 0663830
- Website: https://www.clitheralltownship.com/

Clitherall Township is a township in Otter Tail County, Minnesota, United States. The population was 495 at the 2020 census.

Clitherall Township was organized in 1868, and named after Clitherall Lake.

== Geography ==
According to the United States Census Bureau, the township has a total area of 35.7 square miles (92 km^{2}), of which 29.3 square miles (76 km^{2}) is land and 6.3 square miles (16 km^{2}) (17.78%) is water.

== Demographics ==
As of the census of 2000, there were 549 people, 224 households, and 163 families living in the township. The population density was 18.7 inhabitants per square mile (7.2/km^{2}). There were 492 housing units at an average density of 16.8 per square mile (6.5/km^{2}). The racial makeup of the township was 99.27% White, 0.18% African American and 0.55% Native American. Hispanic or Latino of any race were 0.18% of the population.

There were 224 households, out of which 25.9% had children under the age of 18 living with them, 66.5% were married couples living together, 3.6% had a female householder with no husband present, and 26.8% were non-families. 25.0% of all households were made up of individuals, and 13.4% had someone living alone who was 65 years of age or older. The average household size was 2.45 and the average family size was 2.95.

In the township the population was spread out, with 23.9% under the age of 18, 6.6% from 18 to 24, 20.4% from 25 to 44, 32.1% from 45 to 64, and 17.1% who were 65 years of age or older. The median age was 45 years. For every 100 females, there were 107.2 males. For every 100 females age 18 and over, there were 103.9 males.

The median income for a household in the township was $33,558, and the median income for a family was $41,250. Males had a median income of $26,250 versus $17,396 for females. The per capita income for the township was $17,724. About 11.5% of families and 15.6% of the population were below the poverty line, including 28.3% of those under age 18 and 19.0% of those age 65 or over.
