= John W. Bryant =

Mormon fundamentalist leader

John W. Bryant (born 1946) is an American Mormon fundamentalist. He was the founder and first leader of a sect that is today known as the Church of the New Covenant in Christ now headquartered near Salem, Oregon.

== Conversion to Mormonism ==
In 1964, Bryant was baptized into the Church of Jesus Christ of Latter-day Saints (LDS Church). As a member of the LDS Church, he served as a missionary in Japan. In the early 1970s, Bryant became convinced that the LDS Church had unjustifiably abandoned plural marriage and joined the Apostolic United Brethren (AUB) in Utah, led by Rulon C. Allred.

== Leader of polygamous sect ==
Beginning in 1974, Bryant began to state that he was receiving revelations from Jesus. He claimed that "John the Beloved" had visited him as an angel and instructed him to form an "Order of the Ancients". In 1975, Bryant claimed he was taken in vision to the City of Enoch, where AUB founder Joseph White Musser and Latter Day Saint movement founder Joseph Smith ordained him to the presidency of the church and the high priesthood. At this time, Bryant claimed to be the "One Mighty and Strong" prophesied of in the Doctrine and Covenants. In 1975, he founded a church as the Church of Christ Patriarchal, which later was renamed the Evangelical Church of Christ. In 1979, Bryant's group established a communal settlement at the Fair Haven Ranch near Las Vegas, Nevada. During his time as a leader of the group, Bryant had six wives and taught his sect about drug experimentation and heterosexual and homosexual group sex. According to sources, sect members had sexual relations during the group's temple ceremonies. In 1981, the group lost the Fair Haven Ranch when they were unable to keep up on mortgage payments. As a result, Bryant, five of his six wives, and some of the members of the group relocated to Marion County, Oregon, near Salem.

== Reorganization of church ==
By the mid-1980s, over 100 members of Bryant's church had moved into the Salem area. When the church attempted to convert a barn on the farm to a church building, it was blocked by neighborhood protests. Ultimately, Bryant left the Evangelical Church of Christ due to internal and external difficulties and it soon disintegrated. However, in 1985, Bryant reorganized the church into the Church of the New Covenant in Christ, with a membership of approximately 120 families.

== Teachings ==
As head of the Church of the New Covenant in Christ, Bryant has highlighted what he views as a challenge to Mormon fundamentalism: Bryant argues that Mormon fundamentalists have neglected Jesus in favor of a focus on polygamy and male patriarchy. Bryant's own experience of being "born again" after his move to Salem prompted him to change the name of his church from the "Evangelical Church of Christ" to the "Church of the New Covenant in Christ". Bryant abandoned teaching plural marriage, vowed to take no more wives, and reoriented his family life away from its previous patriarchal structure. However, Bryant remained married to his wives in an attempt to prevent the break-up of his family.
