= Cutler's Park =

- Former Latter-day Saint camp
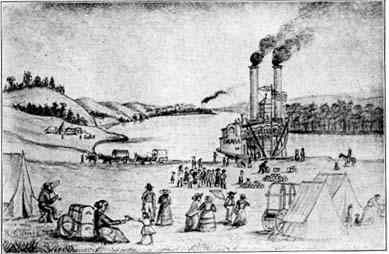
- Mormons at Florence

- Location within Nebraska
- Coordinates: 41°19′57.42″N 95°59′30.2″W
- Country: United States
- State: Nebraska
- Established: August 1846
- Vacated: December 1846

Population (August 1846)
  - Total: 2,500

Cutler's Park was a temporary town established in the Indian Territory across the Missouri River from Kanesville, Iowa in 1846. It was the first town in the future state of Nebraska.

== History ==
Established by 2,500 pioneers from the Church of Jesus Christ of Latter-day Saints (LDS Church) as they were making their way westward to the Rocky Mountains, Cutler's Park was briefly the headquarters camp of the church. It was created in August 1846 and covered the area surrounding what is now the intersection of Mormon Bridge Road and Young Street in Omaha, Nebraska.

Cutler's Park proved to be Nebraska's first and briefest planned community. Although it was made up of only tents and wagons arranged in orderly squares, it had a governing council with various committees, an emergency brigade, and even a town square. A monument has been erected to commemorate this historic site. Cutler's Park was named in honor of Alpheus Cutler, who founded the site. Cutler was an early leader in the Latter Day Saint movement, who was later known for being one of the master builders of the Nauvoo Temple and for establishing his own branch of Mormonism known as the Church of Jesus Christ (Cutlerite).

After local Native nations the Omaha and Oto tribes complained the Mormons were in the wrong location, the church pioneers were told to move by the Indian agent who permitted their stay. Cutler's Park was located 3½ miles west-southwest of the original area they were allotted for their encampment. It was completely vacated by December 1846, with every resident moving back to that location located on tableland next to the Missouri River. There, the church established Winter Quarters, which lasted until 1848 when church members continued onto Salt Lake City, Utah.

It was completely vacated by December 1846, eight years before the Nebraska Territory came into existence. The town of Florence in the Nebraska Territory, was established on the site of Winter Quarters, making use of what had been left when it was abandoned.

== Commemoration ==
The first historical marker for Cutler's Park was originally installed in 1988. In 1997, a new marker was dedicated by the acting president of the Quorum of the Twelve of the LDS Church.

When that marker was in poor condition in the Pioneer Research Group in Nebraska conducted a reclamation project. Installing a new monument, participating in the locating of the original 1846 Cutler's Park, and redeveloping the monument at Young Street and Mormon Bridge Road in Omaha was completed and rededicated.
