= Manti, Iowa =

- unincorporated community
- Location within Iowa Location within the United States
- Coordinates: 40°43′41″N 95°24′11″W
- Country: United States
- State: Iowa
- County: Fremont

Area
  - Total: 0.027 sq mi (0.07 km^{2})
  - Land: 0.027 sq mi (0.07 km^{2})
- Elevation: 1,211 ft (369 m)
  - Density: 921.2/sq mi (355.69/km^{2})
- Time zone: UTC-6 (Central (CST))
  - Summer (DST): UTC-5 (CDT)
- Postal code: 51601
- Area code: 712

Manti, Iowa is an unincorporated community in Fremont County, in the U.S. state of Iowa.

== History ==
Manti was founded in 1852 by Alpheus Cutler and Edmund Fisher, both of whom were prominent members of the newly founded Mormon religion, and led the formation of the Church of Jesus Christ (Cutlerite). Manti originally received its name in reference to a city mentioned in the Book of Mormon.

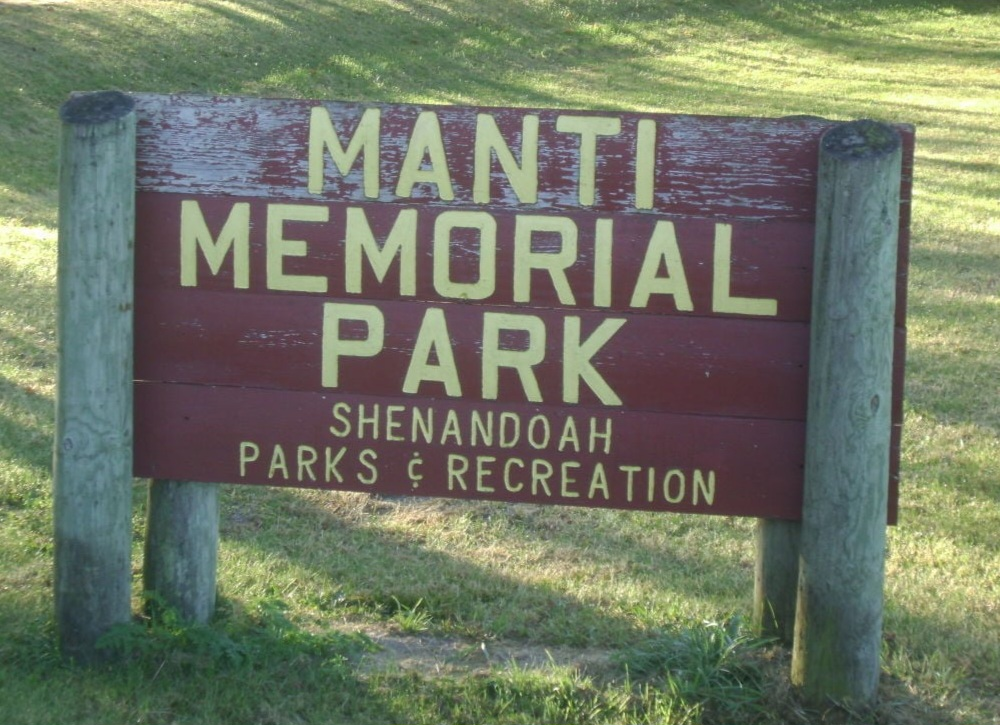
Entrance sign to Manti Memorial Park, which is a former town located just a mile south of Shenandoah, Iowa. This park is within Fremont County, Iowa.

Cutler left from Nauvoo, Illinois and traveled west until settling in the south western corner of Iowa with several others families to form Manti. The Mormon community stayed until the late 1860s before relocating to Clitherall, Minnesota. Cutler was buried in the Manti Cemetery.

== See also ==
- McPaul, Iowa
