= Restored Church of Jesus Christ =

Splinter of the Church of Jesus Christ (Cutlerite)

The Restored Church of Jesus Christ is a small Latter Day Saint church headquartered in Independence, Missouri. It was founded in 1980 by Eugene Oliver Walton (November 6, 1927 – May 28, 2010), who had previously been an Elder in the Church of Jesus Christ (Cutlerite), and who claimed to be the "One Mighty and Strong" prophesied in Mormon scripture. When the Cutlerites rejected his claims to leadership of their movement, Walton left to found his own church.

Walton's organization disavows the label "Mormon", but claims to be the original church established in 1830 by Joseph Smith. His church denies the authority of Brigham Young, who led the majority of Latter Day Saints to Utah after Smith's death, together with that of Joseph Smith III, who became the leader of the Reorganized Church of Jesus Christ of Latter Day Saints. The church also disavows plural marriage, and is unique in the Latter Day Saint movement in that it teaches the existence of a bipartite god (God the Father and Jesus Christ), as opposed to the usual three part godhead of Mormonism (God the Father, Jesus Christ, and the Holy Spirit).
