= Clitherall Lake =

Lake in the state of Minnesota, United States

- Location within Minnesota
- Location: Otter Tail County, Minnesota
- Coordinates: 46°15′N 95°40′W
- Type: lake
- Surface area: 2,493 acres (1,009 ha)
- Average depth: 15 ft (4.6 m)

Clitherall Lake is a lake in Otter Tail County, in the U.S. state of Minnesota. The lake is about one mile south of the village of Clitherall. It has an area of 2,493 acres (1,009 ha) and an average depth of 15 ft (4.6 m). Game fish in the lake include northern pike, largemouth bass, walleye, black crappie, and bluegill.

It is a clear lake with 9 feet (2.7 m) water visibility.

Clitherall Lake was named for Major George B. Clitherall, a land agent and slaveowner.

== See also ==
- List of lakes in Minnesota
