= One Mighty and Strong =

Prophecy in Latter Day Saintism

The One Mighty and Strong is the subject of an 1832 prophecy by Joseph Smith, the founder of the Latter Day Saint movement. The prophecy echoes and parallels the words and prophecies contained in Isaiah 28:2 and Isaiah 11:11; 2 Nephi 3:21–25. The One Mighty and Strong was said by Smith to be one who would "set in order the house of God" and arrange for the "inheritances of the [Latter Day] Saints." Since the prophecy was proclaimed, many Latter Day Saints have claimed to be or to have otherwise identified the One Mighty and Strong. Some schismatic Latter Day Saint sects have arisen as a result of such claims.

== Smith's prophecy ==
In a letter written to William W. Phelps on November 27, 1832, Joseph Smith transcribed a revelation that he said he received from Jesus Christ:

[I]t shall come to pass, that I, the Lord God, will send one mighty and strong, holding the sceptre of power in his hand, clothed with light for a covering, whose mouth shall utter words, eternal words; while his bowels shall be a fountain of truth, to set in order the house of God, and to arrange by lot the inheritances of the Saints, whose names are found, and the names of their fathers, and of their children enrolled in the book of the law of God: while that man, who was called of God and appointed, that putteth forth his hand to steady the ark of God, shall fall by the vivid shaft of lightning.... These things I say not of myself; therefore, as the Lord speaketh, He will also fulfill.

== Canonization by The Church of Jesus Christ of Latter-day Saints ==
In 1876, the excerpt from the Smith–Phelps letter was included as Section 85 in the Church of Jesus Christ of Latter-day Saints's edition of the Doctrine and Covenants.

== Interpretations ==
In a 1905 statement, the First Presidency of the LDS Church—composed of Joseph F. Smith, John R. Winder, and Anthon H. Lund—clarified the prophecy:

It is to be observed first of all that the subject of this whole letter, as also the part of it subsequently accepted as a revelation, relates to the affairs of the Church in Missouri, the gathering of the Saints to that land and obtaining their inheritances under the law of consecration and stewardship; and the Prophet [Joseph Smith] deals especially with the matter of what is to become of those who fail to receive their inheritances by order or deed from the bishop. ...

It was while these conditions of rebellion, jealousy, pride, unbelief and hardness of heart prevailed among the brethren in Zion—Jackson county, Missouri—in all of which Bishop Partridge participated, that the words of the revelation taken from the letter to William W. Phelps, of the 27th of November, 1832, were written. The "man who was called and appointed of God" to "divide unto the Saints their inheritance"—Edward Partridge—was at that time out of order, neglecting his own duty, and putting "forth his hand to steady the ark"; hence, he was warned of the judgment of God impending, and the prediction was made that another, "one mighty and strong," would be sent of God to take his place, to have his bishopric—one having the spirit and power of that high office resting upon him, by which he would have power to "set in order the house of God, and arrange by lot the inheritance of the Saints"; in other words, one who would do the work that Bishop Edward Partridge had been appointed to do, but had failed to accomplish. ...

And inasmuch as through his repentance and sacrifices and suffering, Bishop Edward Partridge undoubtedly obtained a mitigation of the threatened judgment against him of falling "by the shaft of death, like as a tree that is smitten by the vivid shaft of lightning," so the occasion for sending another to fill his station—"one mighty and strong to set in order the house of God, and to arrange by lot the inheritances of the Saints"—may also be considered as having passed away and the whole incident of the prophecy closed.

If, however, there are those who will still insist that the prophecy concerning the coming of "one mighty and strong" is still to be regarded as relating to the future, let the Latter-day Saints know that he will be a future bishop of the Church who will be with the Saints in Zion, Jackson county, Missouri, when the Lord shall establish them in that land; and he will be so blessed with the spirit and power of his calling that he will be able to set in order the house of God, pertaining to the department of the work under his jurisdiction; and in righteousness and justice will "arrange by lot the inheritances of the Saints." He will hold the same high and exalted station that Edward Partridge held; for the latter was called to do just this kind of work—that is, to set in order the house of God pertaining to settling the Saints upon their inheritances.

Curriculum material published by the Church for use in the Church Educational System and published by Scripture Central and the B.H. Roberts Foundation include the full text of the 1905 First Presidency letter.

=== Claimants to the One Mighty and Strong ===
Since the end of the 19th century, a number of individuals have proposed a third interpretation of the prophecy: that Smith predicted the coming of "One Mighty and Strong" and that such a person has been identified. Often, those who claim to have discovered the identity of the One Mighty and Strong identify themselves as the fulfillment of the prophecy.

That interpretation assumes a much broader role of the One Mighty and Strong, extending throughout the church and beyond the confines of Jackson County, Missouri. Such individuals generally have alleged that the LDS Church is "out of order" and that the One Mighty and Strong has been sent to set it in order, as prophesied by Smith.

The following chart includes individuals who have claimed to have identified the One Mighty and Strong:

==== Chart of claimed identifications ====
Date of initial claim	Identifier	Person identified	Notes
various times (1844–present)	Some members of the Church of Jesus Christ of Latter Day Saints (Strangite)	James Strang	Members of the Strangite church have claimed that Strang was the One Mighty and Strong who put the church in order after Joseph Smith's death.
1851	Jason W. Briggs	Joseph Smith III?	Claimed he received a revelation from God, part of which is as follows: "and in mine own due time will I call upon the seed of Joseph Smith, and will bring one forth, and he shall be mighty and strong, and he shall preside over the high priesthood of my church; and then shall the quorums assemble, and the pure in heart shall gather, and Zion shall be reinhabited". This record became accepted as the first genuine document of the early Reorganization movement. Joseph Smith III, however, stated, "I do not personally claim to be 'the one mighty and strong.'"
1867	William W. Phelps	Adam	In a letter to Brigham Young, dated May 6, 1867, Phelps mentioned that he believed that Smith's prophecy refers to Adam and his future arrival at Adam-ondi-Ahman.
c. 1870s	Oliver B. Hunting and others	Brigham Young	Oliver B. Hunting recorded in his journal in 1878 that he was convinced Brigham Young was the One Mighty and Strong. The LDS First Presidency's 1905 letter on the subject mentioned that "Others have insisted that the late President Brigham Young was the man who fulfilled the prediction, when, with such heaven-inspired wisdom and masterly skill, he led the exiled Saints from Nauvoo to the Rocky Mountains and laid their settlements in the valley of Utah."
1887	James Brighouse	Self	Claimed Brigham Young was a fallen prophet and that he was the reincarnation of Adam, Enoch, Moses, David, Ezekiel, Jesus, George Washington, and Joseph Smith
1898	William David Creighton "W.D.C." Pattyson	Self	Demanded that the leaders of the Church of Christ (Temple Lot) sign over ownership of the Temple Lot. Later set fire to the Temple Lot church's headquarters but was found not guilty of arson by reason of insanity.
1900	Committee of the Reorganized Church of Jesus Christ of Latter Day Saints	Possibly Jesus Christ, although left open.	"Whereas, we have received no divine communication authorizing any particular interpretation of the revelation before us; and as the Reorganized Church has never taken action upon the matter; Resolved, that we leave it an open question, to be decided as God may develop his purposes among us, while we acknowledge the leading features in it to be prominently characteristic of Jesus Christ. (Signed on behalf of said committee by chairman and secretary)"
1905	Samuel Eastman	Self	Eastman was excommunicated from the LDS church in 1905 for believing he was the One Mighty and Strong.
1905	John T. Clark	Self	Clark was excommunicated from the LDS Church in May 1905 for his claim that he was the one "mighty and strong."
c. 1930s	Paul Feil	Self	Samuel Eastman's secretary, who believed he was to take up the mantle of One Mighty and Strong upon the former's death.
1932	Francis M. Darter	"an Indian prophet"	Claimed an Indian prophet in Yucatán had been ordained by Lorin C. Woolley and that he and his followers would wrest control of the LDS Church and put it in order
1934	Benjamin F. LeBaron and LeBaron family	Self	Benjamin LeBaron, not Alma LeBaron, Sr., was the One Mighty and Strong
1936	J. H. Sherwood	Self; renamed Jasper No. 7	Sherwood demanded to be made the presiding bishop of the LDS Church based on his literal descent from Aaron and his identity as the One Mighty and Strong; when the LDS Church refused, he began the Church of Jesus Christ of Israel
1938	Joseph W. Musser	Joseph Smith	Many Mormon fundamentalists follow Musser's opinion that Smith himself was the One Mighty and Strong
1943	William A. Draves	John the Baptist	Draves broke from the Fettingites; led to the establishment of the Church of Christ with the Elijah Message, Established Anew in 1929
early 1950s	Theron Drew	Merl Kilgore	Drew was a member of the Church of Jesus Christ of Latter Day Saints (Strangite) and thought Kilgore was the One Mighty and Strong who would act as a successor to Joseph Smith and James Strang in the Strangite church; Drew abandoned his claims after just a few months
1955	Joel F. LeBaron and LeBaron family	Self	the third of the LeBaron family to claim to be the One Mighty and Strong; led to the formation of the Church of the Firstborn of the Fulness of Times
1955	Ross Wesley LeBaron	"an Indian prophet"	LeBaron believed he was sent to prepare the way for the One Mighty and Strong, who would be "an Indian prophet"
1958	William C. Conway	Eachta Eachta Na, a nineteenth century "young white Indian" from Yucatan	Conway stated that Eachta Eachta Na was the reincarnated Joseph Smith and re-established the Kingdom of God on earth in 1890, the year the LDS Church abandoned plural marriage
1960	LeRoy Wilson	Self	former Mormon fundamentalist
1960	Alonzo Langford	Self	
1960	William L. Goldman	Self	
1964	Alexandre R. Caffiaux	Self	founded the Holy Church of Jesus Christ, claimed successor to Strang
1967	Ervil LeBaron	Self	LeBaron claimed that he, and not his brother Joel, was the One Mighty and Strong and rightful leader of the church; Joel was murdered upon his orders in 1972
1975	David Roberts	Self	founded the True Church of Jesus Christ Restored, claimed successor to Strang
1975	John W. Bryant	Self	In 1974, Bryant began to state that he was receiving revelations from Jesus He claimed that John the Beloved had visited him as an angel and instructed him to form an "Order of the Ancients". In 1975 he was taken in vision to the City of Enoch, where AUB founder Joseph White Musser and Latter Day Saint movement founder Joseph Smith ordained him to the presidency of the church and the high priesthood. At this time, Brant claimed to be the "One Mighty and Strong"
1977	Eugene O. Walton	Self	Walton left the Church of Jesus Christ (Cutlerite) and established the Restored Church of Jesus Christ in Independence, Missouri
1980s	Frank Miller	Self	Miller wrote several pamphlets that often condone polygamy and the Old Testament's death penalty for adultery. Bob Crossfield, (also known as "the prophet Onias") and former leader of the Ron and Dan Lafferty group said, "The Millers scare me. To me, they make the same kinds of claims that Ervil LeBaron did."
1980s	Ron and Dan Lafferty	Self	Ron Lafferty and his brothers claimed to collectively be the One Mighty and Strong. They were convicted of the 1984 murders of their sister-in-law and her baby in American Fork, Utah.
1983	Art Bulla	Self	Organized the Church of Jesus Christ (Bullaite)
c. 1997	Brian David Mitchell	Self	Going by the name Immanuel David Isaiah, Mitchell has created a book, referred to by himself as "The Book of Immanuel David Isaiah", and as "The Manifesto of Brian David Mitchell", by others: in this book, Mitchell identifies himself as the prophesied "one mighty and strong": "One who is mighty and strong I have ordained in the stead of him who was ordained of God."
c. 2017	Some members of the Fellowships of the Remnant (Snufferite) movement	Denver Snuffer Jr.	Denver Carlos Snuffer Jr. (born ca. 1955) is a Utah lawyer, de facto leader of the Fellowships of the Remnant, excommunicated from the mainline LDS church in 2013. Some Remnant members reportedly believe he is the One Mighty and Strong.

c. 2025 5 27 Youtube video. David Taylor Midegah, Native American, declared He is the One Mighty and Strong, https://www.youtube.com/watch?v=7Ee2UaPhZV4&pp=ygUHaGF5c3Rhaw%3D%3D
