= Clyde Fletcher =

American religious leader (1894–1969)

Clyde Leroy Fletcher (August 2, 1894 – November 15, 1969) was the founder and sole president of the True Church of Jesus Christ (Cutlerite), a schismatic faction of the Church of Jesus Christ (Cutlerite) that existed from 1953 until his death in 1969. After his death, his few remaining adherents elected to reunite with the main Cutlerite church in Independence, Missouri.

Born and raised in the Cutlerite community in Clitherall, Minnesota, Fletcher elected not to relocate with the main body when it moved the church headquarters to Independence in the 1920s. After President Emery Fletcher's death in 1953, the Independence church, which then contained the majority of Cutlerite members, elected Erle Whiting the church's new president. This was in keeping with a Cutlerite tradition that passed the presidency to the former leader's First Counselor, subject to the membership's approval.

Clyde Fletcher and the Cutlerite remnant in Minnesota did not approve of this step, and Fletcher was accordingly elected president of his congregation in Clitherall, which he subsequently claimed to be the sole legitimate continuation of the Cutlerite organization. He named his church the "True Church of Jesus Christ (Cutlerite)", and began a lengthy court battle with the Independence organization over church properties in Minnesota. A Minnesota court finally ruled in favor of the Independence church in 1966, giving it sole control over all Cutlerite properties and church records. Fletcher refused to accept the legitimacy of the Independence organization and remained at the head of his church (headquartered in the Cutlerite meetinghouse in Clitherall) until his death in 1969. To the end of his life, he continued to claim that his was the only true Cutlerite sect, and the only true church on earth.

Fletcher did not change any of the distinctive beliefs of the Cutlerite church; his organization remained identical to the main body in Independence in every respect save leadership. After his death, his organization's few remaining members elected to accept an offer to return to the Independence church, which led to the folding of Fletcher's church and the end of the schism.

== Sources ==
- Fletcher, Rupert J. and Daisy Whiting, Alpheus Cutler and the Church of Jesus Christ. Church of Jesus Christ, 1974.
- Shields, Steven L. Divergent Paths of the Restoration. Herald House, 2001, p. 158.
- Young, Biloine Whiting. Obscure Believers: The Mormon Schism of Alpheus Cutler. Pogo Press, 2002.
