= Clitherall, Minnesota =

City in Minnesota, United States

- City
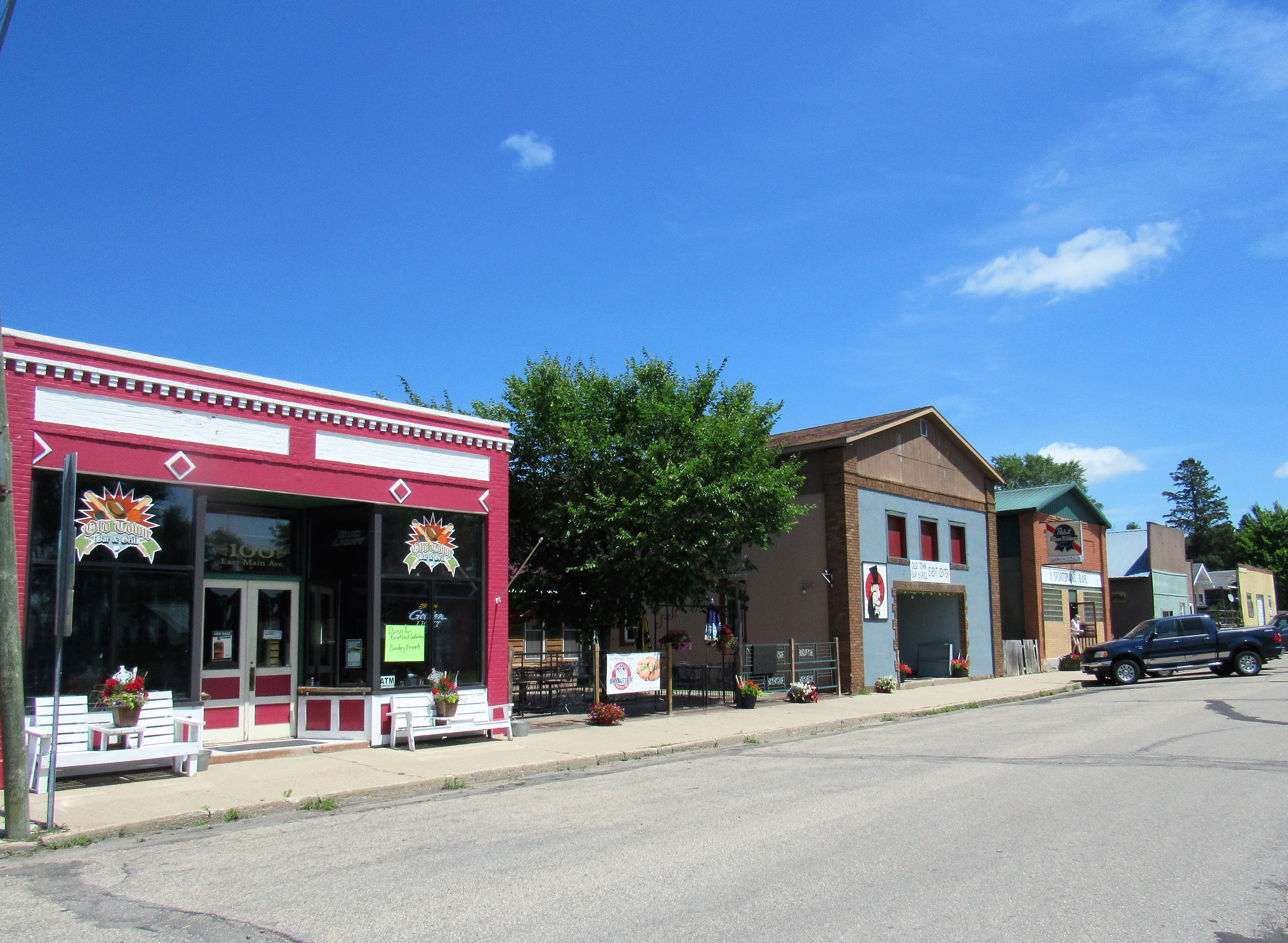
- Downtown Clitherall

- Location of Clitherall, Minnesota
- Coordinates: 46°16′28″N 95°37′52″W
- Country: United States
- State: Minnesota
- County: Otter Tail
- Platted: October 1881
- Incorporated: October 6, 1898

Government
  - Mayor: Kerry Van Santen

Area
  - Total: 0.190 sq mi (0.493 km^{2})
  - Land: 0.190 sq mi (0.493 km^{2})
  - Water: 0 sq mi (0.000 km^{2})
- Elevation: 1,348 ft (411 m)

Population (2020)
  - Total: 62
  - Estimate (2022): 66
  - Density: 325.4/sq mi (125.64/km^{2})
- Time zone: UTC−6 (Central (CST))
  - Summer (DST): UTC−5 (CDT)
- ZIP Code: 56524
- Area code: 218
- FIPS code: 27-12088
- GNIS feature ID: 2393572
- Sales tax: 7.375%

Clitherall (/ˈklɪθərəl/ KLITH-ər-əl) is a city in Otter Tail County, Minnesota, United States. The population was 62 at the 2020 census.

== Geography ==
According to the United States Census Bureau, the city has a total area of 0.191 square miles (0.49 km^{2}), all land.

Minnesota State Highway 210 serves as a main route in the community.

== History ==
The area around Clitherall Lake was the site of one of the earliest permanent European‑American settlements in Otter Tail County after the U.S.–Dakota War of 1862, when a group of Cutlerite Latter Day Saints migrated from Iowa to western Minnesota in 1865 to establish an agricultural colony on the lake’s north shore. The original settlement, often referred to as the Mormon or Cutlerite colony at Clitherall Lake, was organized around a communal religious community that emphasized self‑sufficiency, cooperative distribution of harvests, and peaceful relations with neighboring Indigenous communities.

Clitherall Township was formally organized on October 24, 1868, making it among the first townships in Otter Tail County, and it took its name from Clitherall Lake, which itself commemorates Major George B. Clitherall, a former register of the U.S. land office at Otter Tail City in the late 1850s. A platted village at Clitherall followed in 1881 and was later incorporated in 1898, developing as a rural service center linked to regional lumber and agricultural activity even as later railroad construction shifted much commercial growth to other nearby towns.

Local and county historians frequently describe the Clitherall Lake colony as “the first and, in many ways, one of the most interesting” of the early Otter Tail County settlements, in part because it represented a distinct religious community that endured frontier hardships while playing a notable role in the county’s agricultural and civic development. The legacy of the original settlement is preserved in regional museum collections, interpretive programs, and Cutlerite church history, which document the community’s migration, social structure, and contribution to post‑1860s resettlement of the region.

=== Cutlerite Colony and Founding Families ===
The colony known as Old Clitherall was originally led by Alpheus Cutler, but after his death, leadership passed to Chauncey Whiting. The founding families included the Whiting, Fletcher, and Tucker families who were central to the community’s development.. A vanguard group of seven families, including F. L. Whiting, Calvin Fletcher, and John Fletcher, set out in 1864, enduring blizzards and burning forests before settling on the north shore of Clitherall Lake.

The Tucker family, like the Whitings and Fletchers, were farmers who helped break 60 acres of prairie soil before building log cabins.

Local sources describe cooperative relations with neighboring indigenous communities. The Chippewa, with whom they established a never-broken treaty signed with 37 chiefs at Crow Wing. Trade was common: settlers exchanged cloth and tools for bread, vegetables, and maple sugar.

Clitherall was platted in October 1881 and named for nearby Clitherall Lake, which was named for slaveowner and presidential appointee George B. Clitherall.

In 1953, Clyde Fletcher founded the Mormon sect the True Church of Jesus Christ in Clitherall. With fewer than 10 members, the church became defunct upon Fletcher's death in 1969.

== Demographics ==
Historical population
Census	Pop.	Note	%±
1900	167		—
1910	187		12.0%
1920	178		−4.8%
1930	151		−15.2%
1940	172		13.9%
1950	175		1.7%
1960	138		−21.1%
1970	131		−5.1%
1980	121		−7.6%
1990	109		−9.9%
2000	118		8.3%
2010	112		−5.1%
2020	62		−44.6%
2022 (est.)	66		6.5%
U.S. Decennial Census; 2020 Census

=== 2010 census ===
As of the 2010 census, there were 112 people, 52 households, and 30 families living in the city. The population density was 560.0 inhabitants per square mile (216.2/km^{2}). There were 64 housing units at an average density of 320.0 per square mile (123.6/km^{2}). The racial makeup of the city was 98.2% White, 0.9% African American, and 0.9% from two or more races.

There were 52 households, of which 25.0% had children under the age of 18 living with them, 40.4% were married couples living together, 9.6% had a female householder with no husband present, 7.7% had a male householder with no wife present, and 42.3% were non-families. 36.5% of all households were made up of individuals, and 15.4% had someone living alone who was 65 years of age or older. The average household size was 2.04 and the average family size was 2.60.

The median age in the city was 50.5 years. 20.5% of residents were under the age of 18; 4.6% were between the ages of 18 and 24; 19.8% were from 25 to 44; 28.6% were from 45 to 64; and 26.8% were 65 years of age or older. The gender makeup of the city was 50.0% male and 50.0% female.

=== 2000 census ===
As of the 2000 census, there were 118 people, 51 households, and 32 families living in the city. The population density was 586.2 inhabitants per square mile (226.3/km^{2}). There were 62 housing units at an average density of 308.0 per square mile (118.9/km^{2}). The racial makeup of the city was 94.92% White, 4.24% Native American, and 0.85% from two or more races.

There were 51 households, out of which 23.5% had children under the age of 18 living with them, 58.8% were married couples living together, 2.0% had a female householder with no husband present, and 35.3% were non-families. 29.4% of all households were made up of individuals, and 15.7% had someone living alone who was 65 years of age or older. The average household size was 2.31 and the average family size was 2.91.

In the city, the population was spread out, with 23.7% under the age of 18, 8.5% from 18 to 24, 24.6% from 25 to 44, 22.0% from 45 to 64, and 21.2% who were 65 years of age or older. The median age was 38 years. For every 100 females, there were 107.0 males. For every 100 females age 18 and over, there were 104.5 males.

The median income for a household in the city was $26,667, and the median income for a family was $30,625. Males had a median income of $25,625 versus $17,813 for females. The per capita income for the city was $15,113. There were 6.5% of families and 10.0% of the population living below the poverty line, including no under eighteens and 9.1% of those over 64.
