= Premortal life (Latter Day Saints) =

Mormon teachings on the pre-existence

The concept of premortal life in the Latter Day Saint movement is an early and fundamental doctrine which states that all people existed as spirit bodies before coming to Earth and receiving a mortal body. In Mormonism's eponymous text, the Book of Mormon, published in 1830, the premortal spirit of Jesus Christ appears in human form and explains that individuals were created in the beginning in the image of Christ. In 1833, early in the Latter Day Saint movement, its founder Joseph Smith taught that human souls are co-eternal with God the Father just as Jesus is co-eternal with God the Father, "Man was also in the beginning with God. Intelligence, or the light of truth, was not created or made, neither indeed can be."

Shortly before his death in 1844, Smith elaborated on this idea in his King Follett discourse:

...the soul—the mind of man—the immortal spirit. Where did it come from? All learned men and doctors of divinity say that God created it in the beginning; but it is not so: the very idea lessens man in my estimation...[The Bible] does not say in the Hebrew that God created the spirit of man. It says, "God made man out of the earth and put into him Adam's spirit, and so became a living body." The mind or the intelligence which man possesses is co-equal with God himself...Is it logical to say that the intelligence of spirits is immortal, and yet that it has a beginning? The intelligence of spirits had no beginning, neither will it have an end. That is good logic. That which has a beginning may have an end. There never was a time when there were not spirits; for they are co-equal with our Father in heaven.

Boyd K. Packer, of the Quorum of the Twelve Apostles of the Church of Jesus Christ of Latter-day Saints (LDS Church), the largest denomination in the Latter Day Saint movement, taught, "that we are the children of God, that we lived with him in spirit form before entering mortality."

In the context of this core Latter Day Saint doctrine, the term premortal existence is a more accurate term to describe the time before this mortal existence than pre-existence, since pre-existence has a connotation of something existing before any existence, and Latter Day Saint doctrine specifically rejects ex-nihilo creation. Therefore, the term premortal existence is strongly preferred in the LDS Church, representing the time before this mortal life. However, the term pre-existence is in widespread use.

== LDS Church ==
After Smith's death, and a six-month succession crisis, the majority of Smith's adherents followed Brigham Young who renamed the church to the LDS Church and led followers to what would become Utah Territory. The doctrine of premortal existence was elaborated by some other leaders within the LDS Church. Although the mind and intelligence of humanity were still considered to be co-eternal with God, and not created, Young taught that the spirit was different from the mind or intelligence, resolving the seeming conflict between Book of Mormon verses indicating God was creator and Smith's later teaching that all individuals were co-eternal with God. Young postulated that we each had a pre-spirit intelligence that later became part of a spirit body, which then eventually entered a physical body and was born on earth. In 1857, Young stated that every person was "a son or a daughter of [the Father]. In the spirit world their spirits were first begotten and brought forth, and they lived there with their parents for ages before they came here."

In the LDS Church the idea of spirit birth was described in its modern doctrinal form in 1909, when the church's First Presidency issued the following statement:

Jesus, however, is the firstborn among all the sons of God—the first begotten in the spirit, and the only begotten in the flesh. He is our elder brother, and we, like Him, are in the image of God. All men and women are in the similitude of the universal Father and Mother, and are literally the sons and daughters of Deity.

This description is widely accepted by modern Latter-day Saints as fundamental to the plan of salvation. However, there are differences of opinion as to the nature of the premortal existence in other Latter Day Saint denominations.

The LDS Church teaches that during the premortal existence, there was a learning process which eventually led to the next necessary step in the premortal spirits' opportunity to progress. This next step included the need to gain a physical body that could experience pain, sorrow and joy and "walk by faith". According to this belief, these purposes were explained and discussed in councils in heaven, followed by the War in Heaven where Satan rebelled against the plan of Heavenly Father.

In the 1840s, Joseph Smith stated that the human spirit existed with God before the creation of Earth. Thus, Latter-day Saints believe in a pre-mortal existence, in which people are literally the spirit children of God, though Smith is explicitly quoted in the King Follett Sermon as saying that "God never had the power to create the spirit of man." Latter-day Saints often point to Jeremiah 1:5 as one example of evidence in the Bible for a pre-earth existence. This teaching is primarily based, however, upon revealed doctrine by Smith and his successors to the presidency of the LDS Church. Prior to the existence of spirits, some element of the human spirit, called intelligence, existed eternally in the same sense that God existed eternally, but in a less progressed form of energy or matter. This may explain the church's teaching that man and God are co-eternal (carefully distinguishing "co-eternal" from "equal", which is not a part of Mormon doctrine). Within Latter-day beliefs, Jesus Christ is looked upon as the creator of the Earth under God the Father's direction, while God the Father is the creator of all men, women, and creatures of the Earth.

=== God before the Earth's creation ===
According to Mormon theology, God the Father is a physical being of "flesh and bones." Latter-day Saints identify him as the biblical god Elohim. Latter-day Saint leaders have also taught that God the Father was once a mortal man who has completed the process of becoming an exalted being. According to Joseph Smith, God "once was a man like one of us and [...] once dwelled on an earth the same as Jesus Christ himself did in the flesh and like us."

==== Adam-God doctrine ====
A now reversed teachings by top leaders about God in the pre-existence is the Adam–God doctrine taught in the temple into the 1900s. This now-rejected teaching stated that Heavenly Father was a man from another planet who became exalted and then as the god-archangel Michael formed the Earth and then took one of his wives and became the mortals Adam and Eve. After death they returned to their state of immortal Heavenly Parents.

=== Spirit intelligences and God's spirit children ===
It is believed there were pre-existing "spirit intelligences" that existed before God the Father and Heavenly Mother created spiritual bodies for them: "self-existing intelligences were organized into individual spirit beings" by the Heavenly Parents and they became the "begotten sons and daughters of God". The procreative process whereby the intelligences became spirits has not been explained. While spirit bodies are composed of matter, they are described as being "more fine or pure" than regular matter. The first-born spirit child of God the Father was Jehovah, whom Latter-day Saints identify as the premortal Jesus. Jehovah was a God and was like God the Father in attributes, but he did not have an immortal physical body like God the Father until his resurrection.

=== Council in Heaven ===
God the Father's plan for all his children was to provide a way for them to become more like him. Although they were happy living in heaven with God the Father, God's spirit children could not experience the "fulness of joy" enjoyed by him unless their spirit bodies were joined with a physical body. God the Father convened a "Grand Council" of all his children to propose a plan of progression, known to Latter-day Saints as the plan of salvation. According to the proposed plan, God would provide an earth where spirit children could receive a physical body.

One of the purposes of this earthly existence is for each of God's children to demonstrate through free will the desire to choose righteousness rather than evil. To facilitate free will decision-making, God would cause each spirit child to have no memory of their pre-earth life. All would be given trials and would fall short of perfection, but a savior would be provided, the acceptance of whom would lead ultimately to redemption and a return to live with God the Father forever. Jehovah volunteered to be the savior and said, "Father, thy will be done, and the glory be thine forever." Jehovah was "the only person who could be [the] Savior". During this pre-mortal existence, God the Father presented the following plan to His children:

Human beings would be born on Earth. There they would receive a physical body necessary to exaltation and a fullness of joy. On earth, they would be tested through trials of their faith, and be subject to mortality. A "veil" would be set in place to obscure humankind's memory of its divine origins, thus allowing for "walking by faith" and for greater freedom of choice by enabling individuals to make their own decisions. LDS Church members believe that only those who live good lives, prove themselves obedient to Heavenly Father's commandments, receive the ordinances of salvation, and repent of their sins will be able to return to Heavenly Father's presence (The Celestial Kingdom). However, because each person's experience in mortality is unique, every individual will be judged in accordance with the opportunities, knowledge, and blessings they had while living on Earth.

==== Agency ====
Integral to God's plan was freedom of choice, which God the Father considered an inviolable right of all his children; every individual would have opportunities to make certain choices that would determine the course of their life on Earth and in the hereafter. No human would ever have their freedom taken away in an attempt to force righteous behavior. People would be free to do evil and good, both to themselves and to those around them. Because such freedom would make it possible for God the Father's children to break commandments and sin, a Savior would be needed to offer them freedom from the just consequences of their sins and allow them to repent: this figure would have to overcome both sin and death, making it possible for obedient and repentant individuals to return to Heavenly Father's presence through a plan of mercy. The pre-mortal Jesus Christ, then known as Jehovah, volunteered to be this Savior, agreeing to take upon himself infinite suffering for every sin, mistake, and all pain and suffering ever to be experienced throughout all time by all of God's children. He also agreed to die and be resurrected, thus making it possible for all individuals (obedient or not) to be resurrected. The Holy Spirit would be sent to encourage righteous behavior and guide human beings towards Jesus Christ and Heavenly Father, but would never interfere with freedom.

Also part of the plan was a foreordination of prophets and teachers who would have gifts and callings among men to teach and re-teach correct principles so that freedom could be used wisely. Heavenly Father stressed the important role parents would have to teach their children the path of righteousness and happiness, and the blessing of the holy scriptures that would give a foundation of gospel knowledge, including the knowledge of the saving role of Jesus Christ and the importance of ordinances and covenants in the gospel.

As the plan was explained, God's spirit children also understood that full gospel truth could be lost on the earth as men and women could choose against living by the truth at any point, and could devise other beliefs and ways to live that would be appealing to the natural mind. Yet they also understood that there would be opportunities before the final judgment for every child of God to hear of Jesus Christ and to either accept him or reject him.

LDS Church members believe this plan, ordained by God the Father was not contrived arbitrarily, but was designed based on eternal truths to allow for the greatest possible progress toward a fullness of joy, happiness and love for the greatest number of His spirit children. He loves each of them unconditionally and desires that they progress, knowing that this leads to greater happiness and a potential fullness of joy.

=== War in Heaven ===
After God the Father presented this plan, Lucifer volunteered to save all mankind by removing the need for agency as a necessary requirement of the plan. Lucifer claimed, with agency removed, no one would have the ability to sin against God, that not one soul would be lost, and all would be able to return sinless to the presence of Heavenly Father without the need for a Savior. As recompense for his plan, Lucifer demanded that the power and the glory which God the Father possessed be transferred to him, effectively making him "God." However, to make this plan work, Lucifer alone would need to have his agency intact to fully control and insure that everyone would live sinless. As a result no spirit experiencing this "sanitized" mortality could truly achieve exaltation. God the Father vehemently rejected Lucifer's hobbled plan.

Enraged, Lucifer chose to rebel against God the Father and rallied to him "a third part" of God the Father's children who also preferred Lucifer's plan. The two factions warred, and Lucifer and his followers were cast out of Heaven; Lucifer became Satan, and those who followed him became fallen (also referred to as sons of perdition), and his servants. They were denied the right to have their own physical bodies (and, consequently, the ability to procreate) but were not affected by the "veil". Latter-day Saints believe that Satan and his servants have since sought to undo, counteract, and undermine God the Father's plan by tempting mortal individuals to evil actions, gaining power over them and their bodies, and by attempting to restrict their agency by whatever means possible.

The LDS Church teaches that Revelation 12 concerns an actual event in the pre-mortal existence of man. The Book of Moses, included in the LDS standard works canon, references the war in heaven and Satan's origin as a fallen angel of light. The concept of a war in heaven at the end of time became an addendum to the story of Satan's fall at the genesis of time—a narrative which included Satan and a third of all of heaven's angels. Evidence for this interpretation comes from the phrase "the devil and his angels"; this specific phrasing became paramount to the reinforcement of the notion that people associated angels with the devil preceding the writing of Revelation.

The LDS Church believes that the war in heaven started in the premortal existence when Heavenly Father (Elohim) created the Plan of salvation to enable humanity to become like him. Jesus Christ as per the plan was the Savior and those who followed the plan would come to Earth to experience mortality and progress toward eternal life. Lucifer, another spirit son of God, rebelled against the plan's reliance on agency and proposed an altered plan that negated agency. Thus he became Satan, and he and his followers were cast out of heaven. This denied them participating in God's plan, the privileges of receiving a physical body, and experiencing mortality.

=== Black people and the premortal life ===
By 1844 one of the justifications the church leaders used for discriminatory policies towards Black people in the LDS Church was the belief that their spirits before earth life were "fence sitters" when choosing between God or the devil, or were simply less virtuous than White people's. Brigham Young rejected this pre-existence explanation, but the apostles Orson Pratt, Orson Hyde, and John Taylor all supported the concept, and it gained widespread acceptance among members. Formally, this justification appeared as early as 1908 in a church magazine. The apostle Joseph Fielding Smith supported the idea in 1931 and 1954 publications stating that restrictions on Black people were a "punishment" for actions in the pre-existence. In a 1947 response letter the First Presidency wrote that Black people were not entitled to the full blessings of the gospel, and referenced the "revelations [...] on the preexistence" as a justification. The LDS Church also used this explanation in its 1949 official statement.

In 1952, Lowry published a critique of the racist policy in an article in The Nation which he believed was the first time it was publicized to a wider audience. An address by Mark E. Peterson was widely circulated by religious faculty at Brigham Young University (BYU) in the 1950s and 1960s and they used the "less valiant in the pre-existence" explanation to justify racial segregation, a view which Lowell Bennion and Kendall White, among other members, heavily criticized. A 1959 report by the U.S. Commission on Civil Rights found that the LDS Church in Utah generally taught that non-White people had inferior performance in the pre-earth life.

==== Reversal of teachings ====
After the temple and priesthood ban was lifted in 1978, church leaders refuted the belief that Black people were less valiant in the pre-existence. In a 1978 interview with Time magazine, Spencer W. Kimball stated that the LDS Church no longer held to the teachings that those of Black ethnicity were any less valiant in the pre-earth life. In a 2006 interview for the PBS documentary The Mormons, apostle Jeffrey R. Holland called the previous church teachings that Black people were less valiant in the pre-existence an inaccurate racial "folklore" invented in order to justify the temple and priesthood ban, and stated that the reasons for the previous ban were unknown. For the first time the church disavowed its previous teachings on race in 2013, and explicitly denounced any justification for the temple and priesthood restriction based on any events which occurred in the pre-mortal life.
