= Mormon cosmology =

View of the universe and nature of divinity in the Latter Day Saint movement

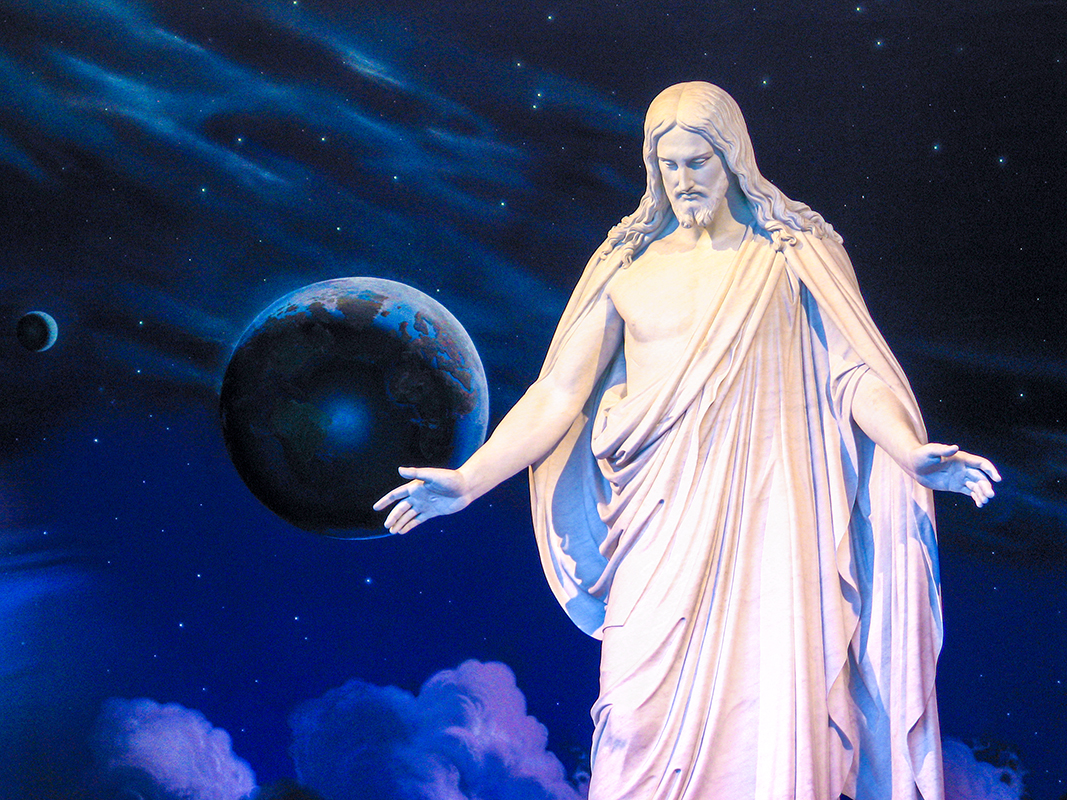
Christus statue of Jesus depicted among artwork representing the planets and stars of the cosmos, which Mormons believe Jesus created under the direction of God the Father.

Mormon cosmology is the description of the history, evolution, and destiny of the physical and metaphysical universe according to Mormonism, which includes the doctrines taught by leaders and theologians of the Church of Jesus Christ of Latter-day Saints (LDS Church), Mormon fundamentalism, and other denominations within the Latter Day Saint movement. Mormon cosmology draws from Biblical cosmology, but has many unique elements provided by movement founder Joseph Smith. These views are not generally shared by adherents of other Latter Day Saint movement denominations who do not self-identify as "Mormons", such as the Community of Christ.

According to Mormon cosmology, there was a pre-existence, or a pre-mortal life, in which human spirits were literal children of heavenly parents. Although their spirits were created, the essential "intelligence" of these spirits is considered eternal, and without beginning. During this pre-mortal life, a Plan of Salvation was presented by God the Father (Elohim) with Jehovah (the premortal Jesus) championing moral agency but Lucifer (Satan) countered with a plan that abolished individual choice, and promised eternal exaltation to all, regardless of individual desire. This alternative plan, while seemingly more equitable, was actually contingent on the glory of God being bestowed solely on Lucifer himself. Thus, Lucifer is referred to as "The Great Deceiver" by prominent Mormon Apostle Marion G. Romney. When Lucifer's plan was not accepted, he rebelled against God the Father and was cast out of heaven, taking "the third part" of the hosts of heaven with him to the earth, thus becoming the tempters.

According to the Plan of Salvation, under the direction of God the Father, Jehovah created the earth as a place where humanity would be tested. After the resurrection, all men and women—except the spirits that followed Lucifer and the sons of perdition—would be assigned one of three degrees of glory. Within the highest degree, the celestial kingdom, there are three further divisions, and those in the highest of these celestial divisions would become gods and goddesses through a process called "exaltation" or "eternal progression". The doctrine of eternal progression was summarized by LDS Church leader Lorenzo Snow: "As man now is, God once was: As God now is, man may be." According to Smith's King Follett discourse, God the Father once passed through mortality as Jesus did, but how, when, or where that took place is unclear. A prevailing view among Mormons is that God once lived on a planet with his own higher god.

According to Mormon scripture, the Earth's creation was not ex nihilo, but organized from existing matter. The Earth is said to be just one of many inhabited worlds, and there are many governing heavenly bodies, including the planet or star Kolob, which is said to be nearest the throne of God.

== Divinity ==
In Mormonism, the concept of divinity of "exaltation" and "eternal progression": mortals themselves may become gods and goddesses in the afterlife, be rulers of their own heavenly kingdoms, have spirit children, and increase in power and glory forever. Mormons understand that there is a Heavenly Mother. However, the three persons of Godhead (God the Father, Jesus, and the Holy Ghost) are to be the only objects of worship.

=== Exaltation and eternal progression ===
In LDS doctrine, the goal of each adherent is to receive "exaltation" through the atonement of Jesus. If a person receives exaltation, they inherit all the attributes of God the Father, including godhood. Mormons believe that these people will become gods and goddesses in the afterlife, and will have "all power, glory, dominion, and knowledge." Mormons teach that exalted people will live with their earthly families and will also "have spirit children": their posterity will grow forever.

According to the belief, exaltation is a gift available only to those who have qualified for the highest "degree" of the celestial kingdom through faith in Jesus and obedience to his commandments. As prerequisites for this "greatest gift of God", adherents believe that in the afterlife, they will become "perfect" and they must participate in all the required ordinances. Though not necessary, their exaltation can be "sealed upon them" by the Holy Ghost via the second anointing ordinance. One of the key qualifications for exaltation is being united in a celestial marriage to an opposite-sex partner via the ordinance of sealing, either in person or by proxy after they have died. In the 19th century, some leaders of the LDS Church taught that participation in plural marriage was also a requirement of exaltation. The LDS Church abandoned the practice beginning in 1890 and now teaches that only a single celestial marriage is required for exaltation.

=== Origin of Elohim (God the Father) ===
According to Mormon theology, God the Father is a physical being of "flesh and bones." Mormons identify him as the biblical god Elohim. Latter-day Saint leaders have also taught that God the Father was once a mortal man who has completed the process of becoming an exalted being. According to Joseph Smith, God "once was a man like one of us and [...] once dwelled on an earth the same as Jesus Christ himself did in the flesh and like us."

=== Origin of Jesus ===
Since the early 20th century, The Church of Jesus Christ of Latter-day Saints has identified Jesus as the biblical god Jehovah (YHWH). The faith regards the Father as the literal biological father of Jesus with Mary. Because Jesus was the Son of God, he had power to overcome physical death. Because he lived a perfect and sinless life, Jesus could offer himself as an "infinite and eternal" sacrifice that would be required to pay for the sins of all of the other children of God.

=== Adam/Michael, under the Adam–God doctrine ===
According to Brigham Young and the endowment ceremony, Adam was identified as the biblical archangel Michael prior to his placement in the Garden of Eden. While the identity of Adam as Michael is accepted by the LDS Church, the pre-existent godhood of Adam/Michael is now repudiated by the LDS Church, but it is accepted by some adherents of Mormon fundamentalism. According to this interpretation of Young's teachings, Michael was a god who had received his exaltation. He took Eve, one of his wives, to the Garden, where they became mortal by eating the fruit in the garden.

Although the LDS Church has repudiated the Adam–God doctrine, the denomination's endowment ceremony portrays this Adam/Michael as a participant with Jehovah in the creation of the earth, under the direction of Elohim.

=== Heavenly Mother and Holy Ghost ===
The official doctrine of the LDS Church includes the existence of "heavenly parents", which is generally understood to refer to the goddess Heavenly Mother, who exists alongside God the Father and is his wife.

God the Father, Jesus Christ, and the Holy Ghost are recognized as the three constituent entities of the Godhead. The Holy Ghost has a spirit body, in contrast with the Heavenly Father and Jesus Christ, who have physical celestial bodies of flesh and bones.

== Extraterrestrial life and other planets ==
Mormon cosmology teaches that the Earth is not unique, but that it is one of many inhabited planets, and each planet created for the purpose of bringing about the "immortality and eternal life" (i.e., the exaltation) of humanity. These worlds were, according to doctrine, created by Jehovah, the pre-mortal Jesus. Because Mormonism holds that Jesus created the universe, yet his father, God the Father, once dwelt upon an earth as a mortal, it may be interpreted that Mormonism teaches the existence of a multiverse, and it is not clear if the other inhabited worlds mentioned in Mormon scripture and teachings refers to planets within this universe or not. Mormon leaders and theologians have taught that these inhabitants are similar or identical to humans, and that they too are subject to the atonement of Jesus.

The doctrine of other worlds is found in Mormon scripture, in the endowment ceremony, and in the teachings of Joseph Smith. In addition, many LDS Church leaders and theologians have elaborated on these principles through exegesis or speculation, and many of these ideas are widely accepted among Mormons. The LDS Church teaches that after death and resurrection, that exalted adherents will continue having marital sexual relations, create worlds, and have spirit children over which they will govern as gods.

=== Official sources ===
According to a revelation dictated by Joseph Smith, Jesus is the creator of many worlds, so "that by him, and through him, and of him, the worlds are and were created, and the inhabitants thereof are begotten sons and daughters unto God." Smith's translation of the Bible also refers to "many worlds", and states that the vision Moses had on biblical Mount Sinai was limited to "only account of this earth, and the inhabitants thereof, [but] there are many worlds that have passed away by the word of my power[, a]nd there are many that now stand." Another part of Smith's translation portrays the biblical character Enoch as stating that if there were "millions of earths like this [earth], it would not be a beginning to the number of [God's] creations; and [his] curtains are stretched out still."

Finally, the portion of the LDS Church's endowment ceremony depicting the creation of the world refers repeatedly to "worlds heretofore created". In the portrayal of the Garden of Eden story during the endowment, after Lucifer has tempted Eve to eat of the fruit of the Tree of Knowledge, God the Father asks Lucifer what he is doing, and Lucifer replies "that which has been done on other worlds."

=== Noncanonical statements by church leaders ===
==== Statements of early church leaders ====
According to Latter-day Saint Oliver B. Huntington, Joseph Smith said there was life on the Moon; Huntington also reported that he was promised in a patriarchal blessing given to him by Joseph Smith Sr. that he would preach the gospel to inhabitants of the Moon.

LDS researchers John A. Tvedtnes and Van Hale have expressed doubt about the reliability of Huntington's claims. Regarding the first, it is likely that Huntington was repeating a description provided by another Latter-day Saint, Philo Dibble. (Huntington was still a child when Smith died.) It is unclear what Dibble's source for the statement is, because Dibble did not indicate whether the recollection was his own or something he had heard from another person. The alleged teaching was first recorded by Huntington in a journal entry after he heard it from Dibble about 40 years after Smith's death. Regarding Huntington's second claim, the official LDS Church's record of the blessing indicates that it was given to Huntington by his father, William Huntington, not by Joseph Smith Sr.

The extract from the blessing suggests a more plausible rationale, in that the events could occur at some time in the future or after mortality. Hence: "thou shalt have power with God even to translate thyself to Heaven, & preach to the inhabitants of the moon or planets, if it shall be expedient".

There are no contemporary reports, records, or any other written support of Smith's alleged views or statements on extraterrestrials, nor are there any reports of statements other than the one claimed by Huntington, which is unverified and therefore possibly unreliable. Tvedtnes and James B. Allen have pointed out that, unlike many of Smith's statements, there is no indication that Smith claimed that any such alleged opinions on extraterrestrials was revealed to him by God nor that Smith was speaking under any prophetic authority.

In a statement given on July 24, 1870, LDS Church president Brigham Young discussed the possibility that the Sun and the Moon were inhabited, but said these were his own personal thoughts. In response to a claim of his being ignorant on the matter, Young agreed, asking, "Are not [we] all ignorant [about these matters]?"

Various writings about Young's statement acknowledge that these were personal beliefs he held and that such beliefs were common in the 19th century and were even considered "scientific fact" by many at the time. For example, William Herschel, the discoverer of the planet Uranus, argued, "[w]ho can say that it is not extremely probable, nay beyond doubt, that there must be inhabitants on the Moon of some kind or another?" Historians have said that Herschel "thought it possible that there was a region below the Sun's fiery surface where men might live, and he regarded the existence of life on the Moon as 'an absolute certainty.'"

In any event, Young's personal beliefs on the subject of "inhabited worlds" are not considered LDS Church doctrine.

==== Modern leaders ====
Some modern LDS Church leaders have taught that people live on other earths. For instance, apostle Joseph Fielding Smith (1876–1972) wrote:

We are not the only people that the Lord has created. We have brothers and sisters on other earths. They look like us because they, too, are the children of God and were created in his image, for they are also his offspring.

[T]he great universe of stars has multiplied beyond the comprehension of men. Evidently each of these great systems is governed by divine law; with divine presiding Gods, for it would be unreasonable to assume that each was not so governed.

Spencer W. Kimball wrote that God has created many worlds populated with his children, and stated, "Are planets out in space inhabited by intelligent creatures? Without doubt."

Apostle Neal A. Maxwell (1926–2004) wrote, "We do not know how many inhabited worlds there are, or where they are. But certainly we are not alone."

== Mormon metaphysics ==
Mormon scripture and the teachings of Joseph Smith include a number of details concerning the nature of light, elements, matter, "spirit matter", and intelligence.

According to Mormon scripture, "the elements are eternal". This means, according to Smith, that the elements are co-existent with God, and "they may be organized and reorganized, but not destroyed. They had not beginning, and can have no end." This principle was elaborated on by Brigham Young, who said, "God never made something out of nothing; it is not in the economy or law of which the worlds were, are, or will exist." Thus, Mormons deny ex nihilo creation and instead believe that God created or "organized" the universe out of pre-existing elements.

Along with physical matter, Mormons believe that spirit "intelligences" have existed co-eternally with God.

Mormons believe in a universe and a God governed by physical law, in which all miracles, including acts of God, have a natural explanation, though science does not yet have the tools or means necessary to explain them.

== Pre-mortality ==
=== Spirit intelligences and God's spirit children ===
It is believed there were pre-existing "spirit intelligences" that existed before God the Father and Heavenly Mother created spiritual bodies for them: "self-existing intelligences were organized into individual spirit beings" by the Heavenly Parents and they became the "begotten sons and daughters of God". The procreative process whereby the intelligences became spirits has not been explained. While spirit bodies are composed of matter, they are described as being "more fine or pure" than regular matter.

The first-born spirit child of God the Father was Jehovah, whom Latter-day Saints identify as the premortal Jesus. Jehovah was a God and was like God the Father in attributes, but he did not have an immortal physical body like God the Father until his resurrection.

=== Council in Heaven ===
God the Father's plan for all his children was to provide a way for them to become more like him. Although they were happy living in heaven with God the Father, God's spirit children could not experience the "fulness of joy" enjoyed by him unless their spirit bodies were joined with a physical body. God the Father convened a "Grand Council" of all his children to propose a plan of progression, known to Latter-day Saints as the plan of salvation. According to the proposed plan, God would provide an earth where spirit children could receive a physical body.

One of the purposes of this earthly existence is for each of God's children to demonstrate through free will the desire to choose righteousness rather than evil. To facilitate free will decision-making, God would cause each spirit child to have no memory of their pre-earth life. All would be given trials and would fall short of perfection, but a savior would be provided, the acceptance of whom would lead ultimately to redemption and a return to live with God the Father forever. Jehovah volunteered to be the savior and said, "Father, thy will be done, and the glory be thine forever." Jehovah was "the only person who could be [the] Savior."

=== War in Heaven ===
Lucifer, another of the spirit sons of God the Father, also sought to be the chosen savior; however, he proposed that the free will of humankind be abrogated so that "all mankind" would be redeemed through compelled obedience. Additionally, Lucifer proposed that all glory and honor (and consequently power) be transferred from God the Father to himself. Lucifer's plan was rejected by God the Father, which caused Lucifer to be enraged and to attempt to overthrow God.

The War in Heaven ensued whereby Lucifer and his followers fought against Jehovah and his followers. A third part of the spirit children of God chose to follow Lucifer. Lucifer and his followers were cast out of heaven by God the Father. Because of their rebellion, Lucifer and the spirits who followed him would not receive a physical body as specified in the plan of salvation. Lucifer is also known as Satan or the Devil. Satan and his spirit followers tempt people to make evil choices.

== Temporal creation and fall ==
Following the War in Heaven, Mormon scripture states Jesus created the earth and the heavens (not to be confused with the Celestial Kingdom which also referred to by the word heaven in Mormonism) under the direction of God the Father. Since Mormon sources state all matter is co-eternal with God, creation of the earth was not performed ex nihilo. Rather, Mormonism teaches that God performed creation by organizing pre-existing matter. The earth and everything on it were created spiritually by God before they were created physically. Jehovah used the priesthood to create the physical earth and everything in it as well as the Sun, Moon, stars, and planets. Jehovah had assistance from other children of God, including the archangel Michael. God the Father and Jehovah together created the physical bodies of Adam and Eve, which were patterned after the physical body possessed by God. Michael's spirit was placed in the male body (Adam), and a spirit daughter of God was placed in the female body (Eve).

Adam and Eve were placed in the Garden of Eden. Although they had physical bodies, they were not yet mortal. God the Father commanded them to have children. He also told them that they could eat of any tree in the garden except for the tree of knowledge of good and evil, and that they would "surely die" if they ate of that tree.

Satan tempted Adam and Eve to partake of the forbidden fruit. Eve yielded to temptation and ate the fruit; when she told Adam that she had eaten the fruit, Adam chose to eat also. As a result of their decision to eat the forbidden fruit, Adam and Eve underwent the "fall". As God had promised, the bodies of Adam and Eve became mortal and they became subject to physical death, as well as sickness and pain. They also underwent "spiritual death": they were cast out of the Garden of Eden and separated from the presence of God. Due to the fall, Adam and Eve also came to know the difference between good and evil and became capable of having children, as God had originally commanded.

As a direct result of the fall of Adam and Eve, all children of God who would be born into the world suffer physical death and spiritual death. While physical death is the separation of the spirit from the body, spiritual death is the separation of a person from God. Spiritual death results from making sinful decisions between good and evil. Were it not for the atonement of Jesus Christ, physical death and spiritual death would both prevent God's children from returning to him with a physical body.

Unlike some Christians, Latter-day Saints generally do not see the fall as a serious sin or as an overwhelmingly negative event. Rather, the fall is viewed as "a necessary step in the plan of life and a great blessing to all of us. Because of the Fall, we are blessed with physical bodies, the right to choose between good and evil, and the opportunity to gain eternal life. None of these privileges would have been ours had Adam and Eve remained in the garden." Latter-day scripture reports that Adam and Eve later rejoiced that they had chosen to partake of the fruit, and the Book of Mormon teaches that the fall was necessary for humankind to exist and for them to experience joy, which is the ultimate purpose of existence.

== The afterlife ==
=== Spirit world ===
If a person physically dies without being given the chance to accept the atonement of Jesus Christ on the earth, they will be given that chance as a spirit after death. Necessary ordinances, such as baptism, can be vicariously performed on behalf of the person in LDS Church temples.

=== Resurrection ===
Mormons believe that Jesus guaranteed the physical resurrection of all humanity. They teach that when Jesus physically died on the cross, Jesus' suffering ended and his spirit left his physical body.

On the third day after his death, Jesus' spirit returned to his physical body and he became the first child of God to be resurrected with a perfect and immortal physical body of flesh and bone. Because Jesus was resurrected, all children of God who ever lived on the earth will one day be resurrected. Thus, the spirit children of God will all receive immortal physical bodies of flesh and bone, and their spirits and their bodies will never again be separated.

=== Final Judgment and the degrees of glory ===
After an individual is resurrected, they will be judged by Jesus as part of the Final Judgment. There are three degrees or kingdoms of glory which are the ultimate, eternal dwelling places for nearly all who lived on earth; a degree of glory is assigned to the person at the Final Judgment. Joseph Smith provided a description of the afterlife based primarily upon an 1832 vision he reportedly received with Sidney Rigdon and recorded as Doctrine and Covenants section 76. According to this section of the vision, there are three degrees of glory, called the celestial kingdom, the terrestrial kingdom, and the telestial kingdom. The few who do not inherit any degree of glory—though they will be resurrected—reside in a state called outer darkness, which, though not a degree of glory, is often discussed in this context. The ones who will go there are known as "sons of perdition"; sons of perdition are to dwell with Satan and his spirit followers.

=== Exaltation ===
Members believe that after the resurrection and judgement many will meet the requirements to achieve exaltation or the highest level of salvation in the celestial kingdom wherein they will eternally live in God's presence, continue as families, become gods, create worlds, and have spirit children over which they will govern. Church leaders have taught God wants exaltation for all humankind and that humans are "gods in embryo". Exaltation is considered by the Church to be the "greatest gift of God" and is also called "salvation" or "eternal life". (Note: Some sources state that "salvation" refers only to the process of souls being freed from the bonds of Hell (also called "Spirit Prison"), or released from Paradise (also called "Spirit Paradise"), and the subsequent resurrection of said souls; while "exaltation" and "eternal life" refer to the state of living with God the Father and Jesus Christ in the "highest degree" of heaven.)

Exaltation consists of "the kind of life God lives". In other words, exalted beings will live in great glory, be perfect, and possess all knowledge and wisdom. Exalted beings will live forever with God the Father and Jesus Christ, will become gods and goddesses, will live with their righteous earthly family members, and will receive the fulness of joy enjoyed by God and Christ. One of the key qualifications for exaltation is being united in a celestial marriage to an opposite-sex partner. Such a union can be created during mortality, or it can be created after death by proxy marriages performed in temples.

== See also ==
- Henotheism
- Multiverse
- Religious cosmology
- Second Coming in Mormonism
- Plan of salvation in Mormonism

== Bibliography ==
- Adams, Lisa Ramsey (1992), "Eternal Progression", in Ludlow, Daniel H (ed.), Encyclopedia of Mormonism, New York: Macmillan Publishing, pp. 465–66, ISBN 0-02-879602-0, OCLC 24502140
- Carter, K. Codell (1992), "Godhood", in Ludlow, Daniel H (ed.), Encyclopedia of Mormonism, New York: Macmillan Publishing, pp. 553–55, ISBN 0-02-879602-0, OCLC 24502140
- Paul, Erich Robert (1986), "Joseph Smith and the Plurality of Worlds Idea", Dialogue, 19 (2): 13–36.
- Johnson, Hollis R. (1992), "Worlds", in Ludlow, Daniel H (ed.), Encyclopedia of Mormonism, New York: Macmillan Publishing, pp. 1595–96, ISBN 0-02-879602-0, OCLC 24502140
- Larson, Stan (1978), "The King Follett Discourse: A Newly Amalgamated Text" (PDF), BYU Studies, 18 (2): 193–208
- LDS Church (1995), The Family: A Proclamation to the World, Salt Lake City, Utah: LDS Church.
- LDS Church (2009), Gospel Principles (PDF), Salt Lake City, Utah: LDS Church.
- Ostling, Richard; Ostling, Joan K. (2007), Mormon America: The Power and the Promise, New York: HarperOne, ISBN 978-0-06-143295-8.
- Pope, Margaret McConkie (1992), "Exaltation", in Ludlow, Daniel H (ed.), Encyclopedia of Mormonism, New York: Macmillan Publishing, p. 479, ISBN 0-02-879602-0, OCLC 24502140
- Ricks, Shirley S. (1992), "Eternal Lives, Eternal Increase", in Ludlow, Daniel H (ed.), Encyclopedia of Mormonism, New York: Macmillan Publishing, p. 465, ISBN 0-02-879602-0, OCLC 24502140
- Vogel, Dan; Metcalfe, Brent Lee (1990), "Joseph Smith's Scriptural Cosmology", in Vogel, Dan (ed.), The Word of God: Essays on Mormon Scripture, Signature Books, p. 187.
- Young, Brigham (April 9, 1852), "Self-Government—Mysteries—Recreation and Amusements, not in Themselves Sinful—Tithing—Adam, Our Father and Our God", in Watt, G.D. (ed.), Journal of Discourses by Brigham Young, President of the Church of Jesus Christ of Latter-Day Saints, His Two Counsellors, the Twelve Apostles, and Others, vol. 1, Liverpool: F.D. & S.W. Richards, pp. 46–53.
- Young, Brigham (August 28, 1852b), "Address", Deseret News—Extra, Salt Lake City: LDS Church, pp. 11–14.
