= Teachings of Joseph Smith =

Doctrinal teachings of the Latter Day Saint movement founder

The teachings of Joseph Smith include many religious doctrines as well as political ideas and theories, many of which he said were revealed to him by God. Joseph Smith is the founder of the Latter Day Saint movement and is recognized by multiple Latter Day Saint churches as the founder. Beginning in 1828, Smith began dictating the text of what later became the Book of Mormon, and also began dictating written revelations he said were inspired by God.

Smith's teachings evolved over his lifetime until his death in 1844. Smith's teachings were published during his lifetime in several books, including the Book of Mormon, the Doctrine and Covenants (which included the Lectures on Faith), the Book of Abraham, and various essays he wrote in church newspapers. Many of his teachings were also published posthumously, including the transcription of sermons such as his King Follett Discourse, his writings in the official church history, and reminiscences of his teachings written by those who knew him.

== Nature of God ==
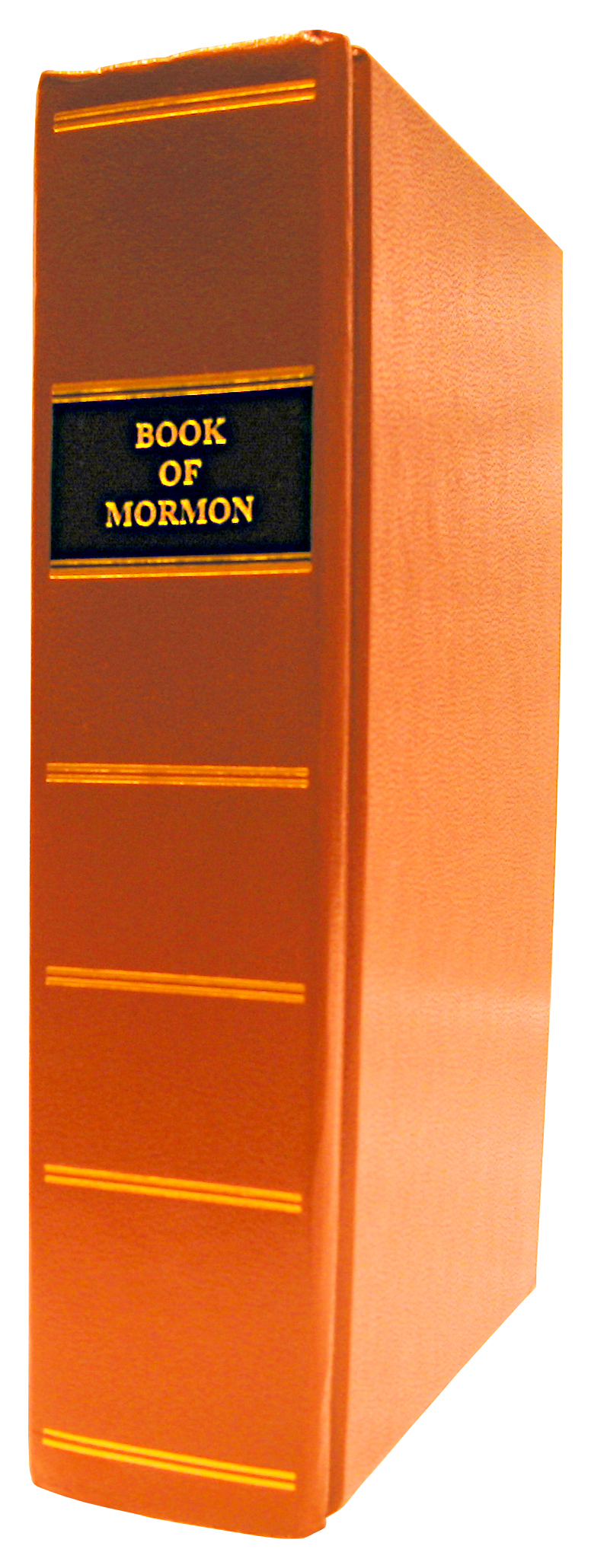
Reprint of the 1830 edition of The Book of Mormon, containing some of Smith's earliest teachings

Historians have debated about Smith's early conception of God. According to Dan Vogel and Thomas Alexander, in the early-to-mid-1830s Smith viewed God the Father as a spirit. However, Terryl Givens and Brian Hauglid argue that although Smith sometimes spoke of God using trinitarian language, revelations he dictated as early as 1830 described God as an embodied being. Catholic philosopher Stephen H. Webb describes Smith having had a "corporeal and anthropomorphic understanding of God" evinced in his 1830 Book of Moses that described God as a physical being who literally resembles humans. Steven C. Harper states that because, in the 1830s, Smith privately described to some of his followers his 1820 first vision as a theophany of "two divine, corporeal beings," "its implications for the trinity and materiality of God were asserted that early".

Over time, Smith widely and clearly articulated a belief that God was an advanced and glorified man, embodied within time and space. (Note: According to Smith's teachings, God's throne is situated near a star or planet named Kolob) By 1841, he publicly taught that God the Father and Jesus were distinct beings with physical bodies. Nevertheless, he conceived of the Holy Spirit as a "personage of Spirit". Smith extended this materialist conception to all existence and taught that "all spirit is matter", meaning that a person's embodiment in flesh was not a sign of fallen carnality, but a divine quality that humans shared with deity. Humans are, therefore, not so much God's creations as they are God's "kin". There is also considerable evidence that Smith taught, at least to limited audiences, that God the Father was accompanied by God the Mother. (Note: According to Susa Young Gates, Smith told Zina Huntington that in the afterlife, "you will meet and become acquainted with your eternal Mother, the wife of your Father in Heaven... How could a Father claim His title unless there were also a Mother to share that parenthood?" See Derr, Jill Mulvay (1996–1997). "The Significance of 'O My Father' in the Personal Journey of Eliza R. Snow". Brigham Young University Studies. 36 (1): 84–126. JSTOR 43042019) In this conception, God fully understood is plural, embodied, gendered, and both male and female.

== Church organization and structure ==
Smith's teachings were rooted in dispensational restorationism. He taught that the Church of Christ restored through him was a latter-day restoration of the early Christian faith, which had been lost in the Great Apostasy. At first, Smith's church had little sense of hierarchy, and his religious authority was derived from his visions and revelations. Though he did not claim exclusive prophethood, an early revelation designated him as the only prophet allowed to issue commandments "as Moses". This religious authority included economic and political, as well as spiritual, matters. For instance, in the early 1830s, Smith temporarily instituted a form of religious communism, called the United Order, that required Latter Day Saints to give all their property to the church, to be divided among the faithful.

=== Priesthood ===
By the mid-1830s, Smith began teaching a hierarchy of three priesthoods—the Melchizedek, the Aaronic, and the Patriarchal. Each priesthood was a continuation of biblical priesthoods through lineal succession or through ordination by biblical figures appearing in visions. Upon introducing the Melchizedek or "High" Priesthood in 1831, Smith taught that its recipients would be "endowed with power from on high", fulfilling a desire for a greater holiness and an authority commensurate with the New Testament apostles.

==== Priesthood keys ====
Beginning in 1834, Smith began teaching the concept of priesthood "keys", and the requirement of literal priesthood ordination and a direct line of apostolic succession. Smith taught that he was the prophet, seer, and revelator of the restored church, and was given all the Priesthood keys necessary for the governance of the church by various angelic messengers in the Kirtland Temple and earlier, including Elijah, John the Baptist, and Saint Peter. He taught that he received revelations for the church from God, and was visited occasionally by angelic messengers.

=== Clergy ===
Whereas the Book of Mormon had required clergy to work independently and support themselves, Smith later dictated revelations providing for clergy following the New Testament model of traveling "without purse or scrip", meaning that they would work as full-time clergy and be supported solely by donations from the church or from those to whom they taught.

== Scripture and revelation ==
=== Book of Mormon ===
In 1830, Smith published the Book of Mormon, which he characterized as a religious history of the indigenous people of the Americas. This book contained discussions and sermons teaching many traditional Christian doctrines, such as the idea that Jesus' death represents an atonement for the sins of humanity, that he was the Messiah, and that he was one with God the Father. However, some scholars interpret the book as portraying modalism rather than the traditional Trinitarian formulation. The book also promoted baptism by immersion, the practice of laying on of hands, the rejection of infant baptism, the existence of a Great Apostasy (thus making Latter Day Saint doctrine firmly Restorationist), and the rejection of secret societies for ill gain. The book taught that all humanity, good and bad alike, will be resurrected and become immortal, receiving back their bodies whole, as a free gift of Jesus, but that the wicked would suffer a "spiritual death" by which they would be forever separated from God. Some of the book's more unorthodox teachings within the context of Christianity include a positive view of the fall of Man, the idea that indigenous Americans were descendants of the Israelites, and the idea that the Americas were a chosen continent reserved only for the righteous.

=== Bible translation ===
Beginning later in 1830, Smith began producing a new revision of the Bible. This translation was a source of new doctrinal teachings, also influenced by the conversion of Sidney Rigdon, a former Disciples of Christ minister who converted to the church in 1831 with his entire congregation. Smith's version of the Bible generally followed the Authorized King James Version, with small changes; however, he also introduced large new passages, including a preface to Genesis and a significantly expanded 24th chapter of Matthew.

=== Revelations ===
According to historian Richard Bushman, the "signal feature" of Smith's life was "his sense of being guided by revelation". Instead of presenting his ideas with logical arguments, Smith dictated authoritative scripture-like "revelations" and let people decide whether to believe, doing so with what Peter Coviello calls "beguiling offhandedness". Smith and his followers treated his revelations as being above teachings or opinions, and he acted as though he believed in his revelations as much as his followers. (Note: Vogel (2004, p. viii, xvii) argues that Smith believed he was called of God, but occasionally engaged in fraudulent activities to preach God's word more effectively; and that Smith's private beliefs were revealed through his revelations.) Smith's first recorded revelation was a rebuke chastising Smith for having let Martin Harris lose 116 pages of Book of Mormon manuscript. The revelation was written as if God were talking rather than as a declaration mediated through Smith; subsequent revelations assumed a similar authoritative style, often opening with words such as, "Hearken O ye people which profess my name, saith the Lord your God."

According to Smith's follower Parley P. Pratt, Smith dictated his revelations, which were recorded by a scribe without revisions or corrections. Revelations were immediately copied and then circulated among church members. Smith's revelations often came in response to specific questions. He described the revelatory process as having "pure Intelligence" flowing into him. Smith, however, never viewed the wording to be infallible. The revelations were not God's words verbatim, but "couched in language suitable to Joseph's time".

Many of Smith's teachings, such as the Word of Wisdom, were delivered as revelations. Others, however, were given in Smith's own voice. Smith gave varying types of revelations. Some were temporal, while others were spiritual or doctrinal. Some were received for a specific individual, while others were directed at the whole church. An 1831 revelation called "The Law" contained directions for missionary work, rules for organizing society in Zion, a reiteration of the Ten Commandments, an injunction to "administer to the poor and needy" and an outline for the law of consecration. An 1832 revelation called "The Vision" added to the fundamentals of sin and atonement, and introduced doctrines of life after salvation, exaltation, and a heaven with degrees of glory. Another 1832 revelation was the first to explain priesthood doctrine. Three months later, Smith gave a lengthy revelation called the "Olive Leaf" that discussed subjects such as light, truth, intelligence, and sanctification. A related revelation, given in 1833, put Christ at the center of salvation.

==== Publication ====
In 1833, Smith edited and expanded many of his previously dictated revelations, publishing them as the Book of Commandments, which later became part of the Doctrine and Covenants.

== Secular administration and commandments ==
=== Zion ===
The Book of Mormon spoke of a city of Zion to be built in the Americas, which would be the same as the biblical New Jerusalem. Smith elaborated in 1830 that the location for this Zion would be somewhere near the United States border among the Native American tribes, and the "elect" of the world would be gathered to this location during the great Tribulation that preceded the second coming of Jesus.

=== Word of Wisdom ===
In 1833, at a time of temperance agitation, Smith delivered a revelation called the "Word of wisdom", which counseled a diet of wholesome herbs, fruits, grains and a sparing use of meat. It also recommended that Latter Day Saints avoid "strong" alcoholic drinks, tobacco, and "hot drinks" (later interpreted to mean tea and coffee). The Word of Wisdom was originally framed as a recommendation rather than a commandment and was not strictly followed by Smith and other early Latter Day Saints, though it later became a requirement in the LDS Church.

=== Consecration ===
In 1830, Smith taught a doctrine of voluntary religious egalitarianism known as the Law of Consecration designed to achieve income equality, eliminate poverty, increase group self-sufficiency, and create the ideal utopian society Mormons referred to as Zion. Members of the Church could deed their real estate to a Church body called the United Order, this property would be divided and allocated to incoming Saints as a "stewardship" or "inheritance". This doctrine was an attempt to recreate the religious communism practiced by 1st century Christians (Acts 2:44, 4:32).

=== Theodemocracy ===
Smith envisioned that the theocratic institutions he established would have a role in the worldwide political organization of the Millennium.

== Cosmology and Plan of salvation ==
=== Degrees of glory ===
Beginning in 1832, Smith taught a doctrine based on 1 Corinthians 15 known as the degrees of glory, holding that those who repent and are worthy will receive greater blessings than those who are wicked, the greatest of which is eternal life, which is to live with God in the celestial kingdom. Those who were not as valiant, or did not receive ordinances necessary for entrance into the celestial kingdom, would enter the terrestrial kingdom. Those who were disobedient and unrepentant would enter the telestial kingdom.

=== Exaltation ===
Through the gradual acquisition of knowledge, according to Smith, those who received exaltation could eventually become like God. These teachings implied a vast hierarchy of gods, with God himself having a father. In Smith's cosmology, those who became gods would reign, unified in purpose and will, leading spirits of lesser capacity to share immortality and eternal life.

In Smith's view, the opportunity to achieve exaltation extended to all humanity. Those who died with no opportunity to accept saving ordinances could achieve exaltation by accepting them in the afterlife through proxy ordinances performed on their behalf. Smith said that children who died in their innocence would be guaranteed to rise at the resurrection and receive exaltation. Apart from those who committed the eternal sin, Smith taught that even the wicked and disbelieving would achieve a degree of glory in the afterlife.

== Theology of family ==
During the early 1840s, Smith unfolded a theology of family relations, called the "New and Everlasting Covenant", that superseded all earthly bonds. (Note: For photographic facsimiles of, transcriptions of, and contextual commentary on Smith's 1842 revelation outlining part of this theology, see Grua, David W.; Rogers, Brent M.; Godfrey, Matthew C.; Jensen, Robin Scott; Nelson, Jessica M., eds. (2021). "Revelation, 12 July 1843 [D&C 132]". The Joseph Smith Papers: Documents, Volume 12: March–July 1843. 457–478: Church Historian's Press. ISBN 978-1-62972-888-9. Archived from the original on December 18, 2022.) He taught that outside the covenant, marriages were simply matters of contract, and that in the afterlife, individuals who were unmarried or who married outside the covenant would be limited in their progression towards Godhood. To fully enter the covenant, a man and woman must participate in a "first anointing", a "sealing" ceremony, and a "second anointing" (also called "sealing by the Holy Spirit of Promise"). When fully sealed into the covenant, Smith said that no sin nor blasphemy (other than murder and apostasy) could keep them from their exaltation in the afterlife. According to a revelation Smith dictated, God appointed only one person on Earth at a time—in this case, Smith—to possess this power of sealing. According to Smith, men and women needed to be sealed to each other in this new and everlasting covenant (also called "celestial marriage") in order to be exalted in heaven after death and that such celestial marriage, perpetuated across generations, could reunite extended families of ancestors and descendants in the afterlife.

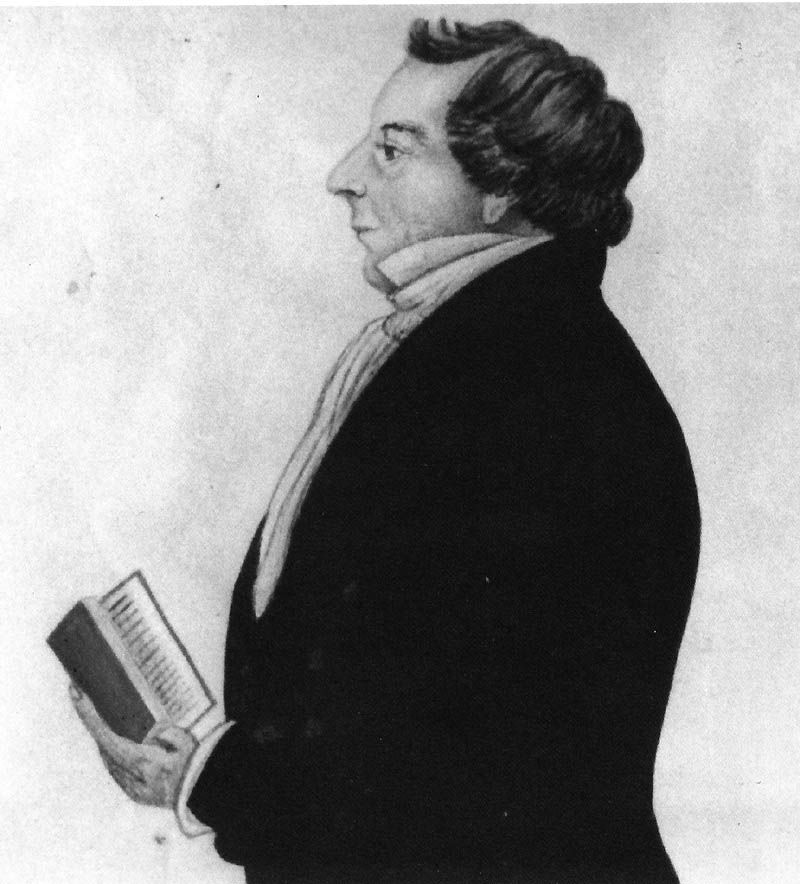
Profile portrait of Smith, by Bathsheba W. Smith, created circa 1843

=== Polygamy ===
Plural marriage, or polygamy, was Smith's "most famous innovation", according to historian Matthew Bowman. Once Smith introduced polygamy, it became part of his "Abrahamic project," in the phrasing of historian Benjamin Park, wherein the solution to humanity's chaos would be found through accepting the divine order of the cosmos, under God's authority, in a "fusion of ecclesiastical and civic authority". Smith also taught that the highest level of exaltation could be achieved through polygamy, the ultimate manifestation of the New and Everlasting Covenant. (Note: Bushman (2005, p. 443) explains that it was only later that Latter-day Saints interpreted Smith's 1843 revelation on "celestial marriage" as applying exaltation to both polygamy and monogamy. However, see Hales (2013, pp. 3: 191–194) for a contrary interpretation holding that although Smith taught that God commanded Latter-day Saints to practice polygamy in his time, "there is no known evidence that Joseph Smith taught that all men and women, irrespective of the time and place they existed, must practice plural marriage in order to be exalted"; for this, see also Foster, Craig L. "Doctrine and Covenants Section 132 and Joseph Smith's Expanding Concept of Family". Persistence of Polygamy. p. 96, in Bringhurst & Foster (2010, pp. 87–98)) In Smith's theology, marrying in polygamy made it possible for practitioners to unlearn the Christian tradition which identified the physical body as carnal, and to instead recognize their embodied joy as sacred. Smith also taught that the practice allowed an individual to transcend the angelic state and become a god, accelerating the expansion of one's heavenly kingdom.

There is wide evidence that Smith practiced polygamy (referred to by Latter Day Saints as plural marriage), and may have begun to do so as early as 1833. Polygamy (marriage to multiple partners) was illegal in many U.S. states, and in Western cultures was widely perceived as an immoral and misguided practice. The practice of polygamy was denied by the Church of Christ and most Church leaders, but not by Smith specifically. Many of those that practiced polygamy pointed to the theory that the patriarchs of the Bible might have had multiple wives, including Abraham and Jacob.

Although it has been alleged that Smith may have had children by his wives other than Emma (most historians believe he married at least thirty-three women, and probably as many as forty-eight), DNA investigations in three cases have established that their biological fathers were Smith's wives' other husbands. The DNA research, so far, has failed to confirm Smith's paternity for any children other than those borne by his legal spouse, Emma.

Most historians accept "sealing" records (in many cases notarized) as evidence that Smith taught and practiced polygamy. The records are supported by personal journals and diaries maintained by Smith's followers. These sources indicate that, though the doctrine was not widely taught during Smith's life, marriages of this type were performed for select members of the church in the early 1830s. Smith was married (sealed) to several dozen women, both during his life and by proxy after his death, though the records are incomplete. Evidence suggests that he may have cohabited only with his first wife, Emma, and she was the only one known with certainty to have borne his children. Historian Todd Compton notes that Smith's practices included elements of both polygyny and polyandry.

== Temples ==
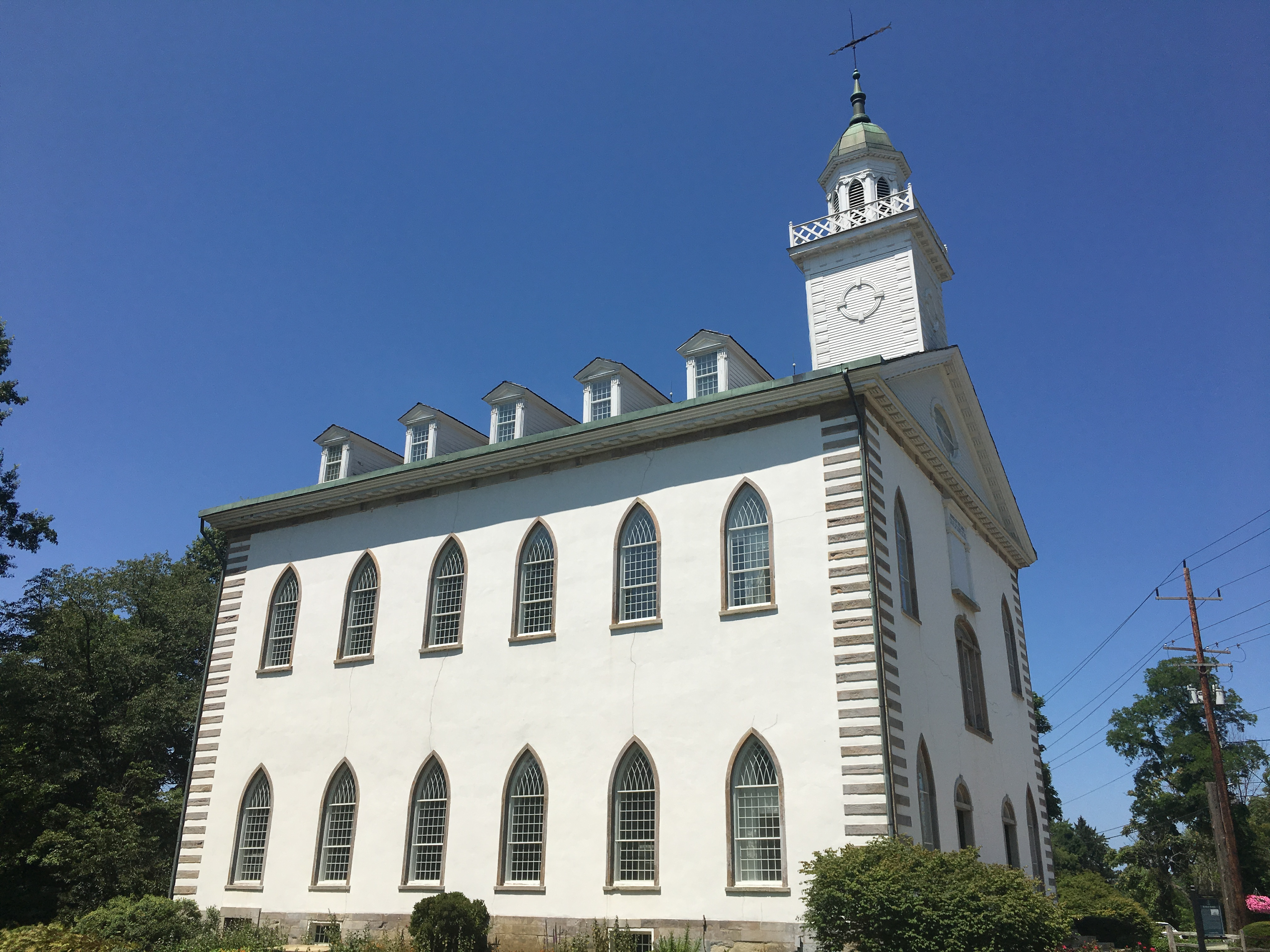
The Kirtland Temple in Ohio

During Smith's time in Kirtland, he instructed his followers to construct a temple as a "house of God." Later, the Nauvoo Temple was promoted as a place for recovering lost ancient knowledge.

=== Endowment ceremony ===
On May 3, 1842, Joseph Smith prepared the second floor of his Red Brick Store, in Nauvoo, Illinois, to represent "the interior of a temple as circumstances would permit". The next day, May 4, he introduced the Nauvoo endowment ceremony to nine of his closest associates. The endowment is a two-part ordinance (ceremony) designed for participants to become kings, queens, priests, and priestesses in the afterlife. As part of the first ceremony, participants take part in a scripted reenactment of the Biblical creation and fall of Adam and Eve. The ceremony includes a symbolic washing and anointing, and receipt of a "new name" which they are not to reveal to others except at a certain part in the ceremony, and the receipt of the temple garment. Participants are taught symbolic gestures and passwords considered necessary to pass by angels guarding the way to heaven, and are instructed not to reveal them to others.

=== Baptism for the dead ===
Smith first taught the doctrine of baptism the dead at the funeral sermon of a church member, Seymour Brunson. Smith later expanded upon this doctrine and stated that such baptisms are to be performed only in temples. Vicarious baptism is performed in connection with other vicarious ordinances in temples of the LDS Church, such as the endowment and celestial marriage.

== Ethics and behavior ==
A succinct statement of ethics by Smith is found in his 13th Article of Faith:

We believe in being honest, true, chaste, benevolent, virtuous, and in doing good to all men; indeed, we may say that we follow the admonition of Paul—We believe all things, we hope all things, we have endured many things, and hope to be able to endure all things. If there is anything virtuous, lovely, or of good report or praiseworthy, we seek after these things.

Smith said his ethical rule was, "When the Lord commands, do it".

He also taught:

that which is wrong under one circumstance, may be and often is, right under another. God said thou shalt not kill—at another time he said thou shalt utterly destroy. This is the principle on which the government of heaven is conducted—by revelation adapted to the circumstances in which the elders of the kingdom are placed. Whatever God requires is right ... even things which may be considered abominable to all those who do not understand the order of heaven.

Beginning in the mid-1830s and into the 1840s, as the Mormons became involved in conflicts with the Missouri and Illinois state governments, Smith taught that "Congress has no power to make a law that would abridge the rights of my religion," and that they were not under the obligation to follow laws they deemed as being contrary to their "religious privilege". Smith may have thus felt justified in promoting polygamy despite its violation of some traditional ethical standards.

== Political views ==
While campaigning for president in 1844, Smith had the opportunity to take political positions on issues of the day. He considered the U.S. Constitution, and especially the Bill of Rights, to be inspired by God and "the [Latter Day] Saints' best and perhaps only defense." He believed a strong central government was crucial to the nation's well-being and thought democracy better than tyranny—although he also taught that a theocratic monarchy was the ideal form of government. In foreign affairs, Smith was an expansionist, though he viewed "expansionism as brotherhood" and envisioned expanding the United States with the permission of indigenous peoples and at the request of other sovereign peoples. In practice, Smith advocated accepting Texas into the Union, claiming the disputed Oregon country, and someday incorporating Canada and Mexico into the United States.

To protect U.S. business and agriculture, Smith favored high tariffs and a publicly owned central national bank with democratically elected officers that would print currency but "never issue any more bills than the amount of capital stock in her vaults and the interest". He opposed imprisonment for debt or as a criminal penalty (except in the case of murder), recommended abolishing courts-martial for military deserters, and encouraged citizens to petition their state leaders to pardon all convicts. He suggested that courts instead sentence convicts to labor on public works projects, such as road building, and he argued that providing education would make prisons obsolete. He also advocated capital punishment for public officials who failed to aid people whose constitutional rights had been abridged.

Smith declared that he would be one of the instruments in fulfilling Nebuchadnezzar's statue vision in the Book of Daniel: that secular government would be destroyed without bloodshed, and would be replaced with a "theodemocratic" Kingdom of God. He taught that this kingdom would be governed by theocratic principles, but that it would also be multi-denominational and democratic, so long as the people chose wisely.

=== Slavery and race ===
Smith held differing positions on the issue of slavery. Initially he opposed it, but during the mid-1830s, when the Mormons were settling in Missouri (a slave state) he justified slavery in an anti-abolitionist essay. In the early 1840s, after Mormons had been expelled from Missouri, he changed his position again and opposed slavery. During his presidential campaign of 1844, he proposed that the federal government end slavery by 1850 by financially compensating enslavers.

However, biographer Donna Hills notes that Smith's "feelings were complex...and cannot be neatly classified as liberal." Smith did not support black self-government and opposed interracial marriage. Although he welcomed black Americans, enslaved and free, into church membership, he instructed his followers not to baptize slaves without permission of their enslavers. He once said that black people "came into the world as slaves" but that this was a situational condition of enslavement rather than a permanent characteristic, and that black Americans were as capable of education as white Americans.

Smith and other early Mormons believed racial division was a temporary estrangement of an initially united human family, and they considered Smith's religious movement a divinely ordained way to restore humanity to its original relationship. However, they envisioned this unity in terms of a "white universalism" in which people of color and indigenous people would assimilate into whiteness and "overcome the legacy of spiritual inferiority of the cursed lineages" into which Smith and his followers believed people of color were born. (Note: This belief in "cursed lineages" was related to a racist biblical interpretation, popular in early America, which held that Noah had placed a hereditary curse on Ham's son Canaan and that Canaan and Ham were the ancestors of people of Black African descent. See Mueller (2017, pp. 15–16).)

== Timeline ==
The focus, and in some cases the content, of Smith's teachings evolved throughout his life. Below is a chronological summary of Smith's most distinctive doctrines and teachings, organized by the date (approximate in some cases) where he first preached them publicly.

- 1823 – Buried treasure near home in Palmyra, NY
- 1825 – Buried treasure in Harmony, PA
- 1826 – Buried treasure in Bainbridge, NY
- 1827 – Golden Plates and spectacles as recovered Palmyra artifacts
- 1828 – Reformed Egyptian, Lost 116 pages
- 1830
  - Great Apostasy and Restoration, Confirmation
  - Book of Mormon and the Jewish Indian theory
- 1831
  - Law of consecration
  - High priesthood
  - Zion in Independence Missouri
- 1832
  - Degrees of glory
  - First Presidency
  - Urim and Thummim
- 1833
  - Word of wisdom
  - Plural marriage (limited audience)
- 1835
  - Doctrine and Covenant publish, naming Moroni and featurig Restoration account with John the Baptist, Peter, James and John
  - Quorum of the Twelve Apostles and Quorum of the Seventy
  - Mummy of Abraham
- 1836
  - 21 January 1836 – Washing and anointing
  - Account of meeting Moses, Elias, and Elijah
- 1838 Joseph Smith History
  - First Vision account with two personages
  - Nighttime encounter with treasure guardian named Nephi
- 1840 – Baptism for the dead
- 1842
  - Temple Endowment
  - Anointed Quorum
  - Book of Abraham and Kolob
- 1843
  - Second anointing,
- 1844
  - Council of Fifty, Smith as Prophet, Priest and King
  - Exaltation as in King Follett discourse

== See also ==
- Articles of Faith (Latter Day Saints)
- Wentworth Letter
- Prophecies of Joseph Smith
- Mormonism#Theology
- Latter Day Saint movement#Beliefs
- Mormonism and Nicene Christianity
