= Gary Lawrence =

American opinion pollster

- Education: Brigham Young University (BA); Stanford University (PhD)
- Years active: 1972-present
- Political party: Republican

Gary C. Lawrence is an American opinion pollster.

== Biography ==
=== Personal life ===
Lawrence received a B.A. in political science from Brigham Young University and a PhD in public affairs communication from Stanford University in 1972. Lawrence has spoken positively of his experiences at Stanford due to the enjoyably rigorous discussions he took part in, noting that he was the only Mormon, Republican, and conservative in his department, and thus he easily got into debates. As a devout Latter-day Saint, he has served in various official positions, such as being a missionary in Germany, a bishop, and a temple ordinance worker. He runs a polling company called Lawrence Research in Santa Ana, California.

=== Public opinions research ===
He conducted a poll in the spring of 2007 to investigate public perceptions of Latter-day Saints in the United States. He subsequently published a book in 2008 entitled How Americans View Mormonism: Seven Steps to Improve Our Image. When looking at the data concerning negative perceptions of Mormons, the book found that among the non-Mormon public...

- 43% believed that the LDS Church treats women as second-class citizens
- 39% thought that Mormons use pressure tactics
- 38% had said that the church is pushy
- 16% saw the church as racist
- 16% said that it is a “church to be feared"

The book also found that only 5% of non-Mormons said that they would be willing to seriously investigate the Church's claims. The research indicated that non-Mormons generally did not know much about Mormon beliefs, finding, for instance, that only 23% could correctly identify the LDS understanding of the Trinity. In spite of this, the book indicated that almost half of all Americans knew an active member of the LDS church, up to 71% have seen LDS ads on TV, and almost two-thirds have been approached by a Mormon missionary at some point.

Among the book's "seven-step improvement regime" are calls for Mormons to "listen before commenting," using less LDS-specific jargon, speaking plainly, following the Golden Rule, and removing "pressure tactics" from missionary outreach. He elaborated by saying that Mormons must remind the public that "force has no place in the church," and that they are committed to freedom of choice and the related principle of free agency."

=== Politics ===
During the 2008 controversy surrounding California's Proposition 8, which would outlaw same-sex marriage in the state, Lawrence published an online article for Meridian Magazine in which he said that "the new battle field" in the war in Heaven was now California, and further proclaimed that Lucifer employed appeals to equality and sympathy in order to win over converts. Lawrence explained that "if the arguments used in the war in heaven were persuasive enough to draw billions of God's spirit children away from him, why should we not expect them to be used on the present battlefield?" He further said that "the same minions cast out from the Father's presence still remember what worked up there." Lawrence continued to publish articles on spiritual and socio-political topics.
