= Plan of salvation in Mormonism =

Alleged plan God created to save, redeem and exalt humankind

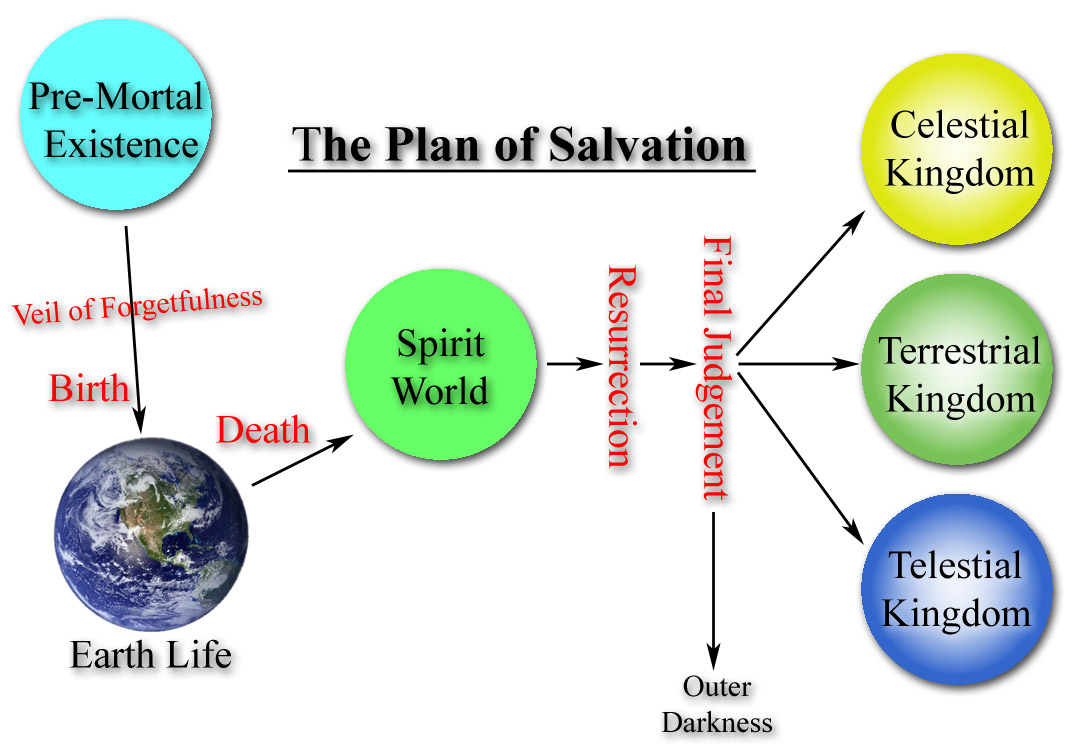
The plan of salvation as taught by the Church of Jesus Christ of Latter-day Saints

The Plan of Salvation is a concept taught by several denominations in Mormonism including the Church of Jesus Christ of Latter-day Saints (LDS Church), the largest denomination in the Latter Day Saint movement. This plan is believed to have been created by God, or "Heavenly Parents who love us", to save, redeem, and achieve exaltation for all humankind to be like God. Other Mormon denominations that teach the plan of salvation and exaltation include the Fundamentalist Church of Jesus Christ of Latter-Day Saints (FLDS Church), the Allred group or Apostolic United Brethren (AUB), and the LeBaron Church of the Firstborn. This belief is also known as the plan of happiness and the plan of redemption or simply the plan. It has been described as the "central foundation" of the LDS Church's religion.

The elements of this plan are drawn from various sources, including the Bible, (Note: See for example Matthew 13:43, John 14:2, 2 Corinthians 12:2, 1 Corinthians 15:40–41, Genesis 2:4–5, Genesis 2:7, Job 38:4, Ecclesiastes 12:7, Jeremiah 1:5, Zechariah 12:1, and Hebrews 12:9) Book of Mormon, Doctrine & Covenants, Pearl of Great Price, and numerous statements made by the leadership of the LDS Church. Scholars have also noted similarities between the LDS plan of salvation, and the teachings of mystic Emanuel Swedenborg and various Calvinist and Universalist Christian denominations.

== Summary ==
=== Premortal life ===
Joseph Smith taught the human spirit existed with God before the creation of Earth. Thus, Latter-day Saints believe in a pre-mortal existence, in which people are literally the spirit children of God. However, in notes of the 1844 King Follett Sermon Smith was quoted as saying that "God never had the power to create the spirit of man." Latter-day Saints often point to Jeremiah 1:5 as one example of evidence in the Bible for a pre-earth existence. (Note: In this section Jeremiah the prophet is told that the Lord knew him before He formed him in the belly and before he came out of the womb and was sanctified and ordained to be a prophet at that time.) This teaching is primarily based, however, upon revealed doctrine by Smith and his successors to the presidency of the church. Prior to the existence of spirits, some element of the human spirit, called intelligence, existed eternally in the same sense that God existed eternally, but in a less progressed form of energy or matter. This may explain the church's teaching that man and God are co-eternal (carefully distinguishing "co-eternal" from "equal", which is not a part of Mormon doctrine). Within Latter-day beliefs, Jesus Christ is looked upon as the creator of the Earth under God the Father's direction, while God the Father is the creator of all men, women, and creatures of the Earth.

During this pre-mortal existence, God the Father presented the following plan to His children:

Human beings would be born on Earth. There they would receive a physical body necessary to exaltation and a fullness of joy. On earth, they would be tested through trials of their faith, and be subject to mortality. A "veil" would be set in place to obscure humankind's memory of its divine origins and to separate them from God's presence, thus allowing for "walking by faith" and for greater freedom of choice by enabling individuals to make their own decisions. LDS Church members believe that only those who make and keep essential covenants, repent of their sins, and have and act on a true faith in Jesus Christ and His power will be able to return to Heavenly Father's presence (The Celestial Kingdom). However, because each person's experience in mortality is unique, every individual will be judged in accordance with the opportunities, knowledge, and blessings they had while living on Earth.

Integral to this plan was freedom of choice, which God the Father considered an inviolable right of all his children; every individual would have opportunities to make certain choices that would determine the course of their life on Earth and in the hereafter. No human would ever have their freedom taken away in an attempt to force righteous behavior. People would be free to do evil and good, both to themselves and to those around them. Because such freedom would make it possible for God the Father's children to break commandments and sin, a Savior would be needed to offer them freedom from the just consequences of their sins and allow them to repent: this figure would have to overcome both sin and death, making it possible for obedient and repentant individuals to return to Heavenly Father's presence through a plan of mercy. The pre-mortal Jesus Christ, then known as Jehovah, volunteered to be this Savior, agreeing to take upon himself infinite suffering for every sin, mistake, and all pain and suffering ever to be experienced throughout all time by all of God's children. He also agreed to die and be resurrected, thus making it possible for all individuals (obedient or not) to be resurrected. The Holy Spirit would be sent to encourage righteous behavior and guide human beings towards Jesus Christ and Heavenly Father, but would never interfere with freedom.

Also part of the plan was a foreordination of prophets and teachers who would have gifts and callings among men to teach and re-teach correct principles so that freedom could be used wisely. Heavenly Father stressed the important role parents would have to teach their children the path of righteousness and happiness, and the blessing of the holy scriptures that would give a foundation of gospel knowledge, including the knowledge of the saving role of Jesus Christ and the importance of ordinances and covenants in the gospel.

As the plan was explained, God's spirit children also understood that full gospel truth could be lost on the earth as men and women could choose against living by the truth at any point, and could devise other beliefs and ways to live that would be appealing to the natural mind. Yet they also understood that there would be opportunities before the final judgment for every child of God to hear of Jesus Christ and to either accept him or reject him.

LDS Church members believe this plan, ordained by God the Father was not contrived arbitrarily, but was designed based on eternal truths to allow for the greatest possible progress toward a fullness of joy, happiness and love for the greatest number of His spirit children. He loves each of them unconditionally and desires that they progress, knowing that this leads to greater happiness and a potential fullness of joy.

==== War in Heaven ====
After God the Father presented this plan, Lucifer volunteered to save all mankind by removing the need for agency as a necessary requirement of the plan. Lucifer stated, with agency removed, no one would have the ability to sin against God, that not one soul would be lost, and all would be able to return sinless to the presence of Heavenly Father without the need for a Savior. As recompense for his plan, Lucifer demanded that the power and the glory which God the Father possessed be transferred to him, effectively making him "God." However, to make this plan work, Lucifer alone would need to have his agency intact to fully control and insure that everyone would live sinless. As a result, no spirit experiencing this "sanitized" mortality could truly achieve exaltation. God the Father vehemently rejected Lucifer's hobbled plan.

Enraged, Lucifer chose to rebel against God the Father and rallied to him "a third part" of God the Father's children who also preferred Lucifer's plan. The two factions warred, and Lucifer and his followers were cast out of Heaven; Lucifer became Satan, and those who followed him became fallen (also referred to as sons of perdition), and his servants. They were denied the right to have their own physical bodies (and, consequently, the ability to procreate) but were not affected by the "veil". Latter-day Saints believe that Satan and his servants have since sought to undo, counteract, and undermine God the Father's plan by tempting mortal individuals to evil actions, gaining power over them and their bodies, and by attempting to restrict their agency by whatever means possible.

=== Spirit world ===
Latter-day Saint beliefs include the belief in a spirit world between death and the resurrection. They believe that the "veil of forgetfulness" will be removed before they are judged thereafter, and that the spirits of all of mankind continue to prepare for judgment day and their eventual resurrection where they will receive a reward according to their faith and works. They believe that righteous individuals continue to proclaim the gospel of Jesus Christ in the Spirit World, teaching others and offering them the opportunity to accept Jesus Christ as their Savior and follow God the Father's plan by accepting ordinances done by saints on earth in their behalf.

=== Final Judgment ===
The Latter-day Saints believe that the Final Judgment of mankind will occur after the final resurrection, and that Jesus Christ is ultimately the Judge of all men. Joseph Smith taught:

He will judge them, 'not according to what they have not, but according to what they have,' those who have lived without law will be judged without law, and those who have a law will be judged by that law. We need not doubt the wisdom and intelligence of the Great Jehovah; He will award judgment or mercy to all nations according to their several deserts, their means of obtaining intelligence, the laws by which they are governed, the facilities afforded them of obtaining correct information, and His inscrutable designs in relation to the human family; and when the designs of God shall be made manifest, and the curtain of futurity be withdrawn, we shall all of us eventually have to confess that the Judge of all the earth has done right.

Another description of the benevolence of the final judgment was presented by President George Q. Cannon of the First Presidency of the LDS Church in 1884:

God's providence is over all His children, and He will reward every man and every woman according to his or her works, and He will reward those who have lived exemplary lives, those who have been moral, whether they be heathen or Christian, whether they have known the name of Jesus or not, whether they have the Bible or the Koran or some other book or no book at all; whatever may have been their condition and circumstances, if they have lived according to the light that God has given them and to laws that they understood, God will reward them and will eventually bestow every blessing upon them which they are capable of receiving.

== Salvation in the LDS Church ==
Unlike Nicene Christianity, Latter-day Saints believe in multiple types and levels of salvation:

- Joseph B. Wirthlin, of the Quorum of the Twelve Apostles, taught that immortality and physical resurrection are gifts freely given to everyone and made possible by Jesus Christ. The Book of Mormon says, "The spirit and the body shall be reunited again in its perfect form...even as we now are at this time. ...This restoration shall come to all, both old and young, both bond and free, both male and female, both the wicked and the righteous; and even there shall not so much as a hair of their heads be lost; but every thing shall be restored to its perfect frame."
- Dallin H. Oaks, then first counselor in the First Presidency, said Latter-day Saints believe in three distinct "kingdoms of glory," the highest being the Celestial Kingdom. Within the Celestial Kingdom, there are three additional degrees, and those who achieve the highest degree of the Celestial Kingdom become gods and goddesses, Oaks explains.
- The Doctrine & Covenants says that individuals who have "denied the Holy Spirit after having received it" become sons of perdition. The LDS Gospel Principles manual teaches that outer darkness is reserved for those "who had testimonies of Jesus through the Holy Ghost and knew the power of the Lord but allowed Satan to overcome them ... They will live in eternal darkness, torment, and misery with Satan and his angels forever." Other LDS publications have reiterated this concept.

== Hypothesized influence of Emanuel Swedenborg ==
Historian D. Michael Quinn in his book Early Mormonism and the Magic World View, has stated that various parts of the plan of salvation were taken by Joseph Smith from Emanuel Swedenborg's book Heaven and Hell. In the book, Swedenborg wrote that "There are three heavens" that are "entirely distinct from each other." He called the highest heaven "the Celestial Kingdom," and stated that the inhabitants of the three heavens corresponded to the "sun, moon and stars." Quinn further argues that the book was available to Smith, and that he was familiar with it. One account states that Smith told Latter Day Saint convert from Swedenborgism Edward Hunter that "Emanuel Swedenborg had a view of the world to come, but for daily food he perished." Additionally, Quinn asserts that the book was in the Palmyra public library beginning in 1817, and that "[n]ine miles from Smith's farm, in 1826 the Canandaigua newspaper also advertised Swedenborg's book for sale. The bookstore offered Swedenborg's publications for as little as 37 cents."

Historian Richard Bushman argues that it was more likely that both Swedenborg and Smith were influenced by New Testament scriptures that refer to "celestial" and "terrestrial" bodies that are compared to the sun, moon, and stars, noting fundamental differences between Smith's and Swedenborg's versions of heaven. Bushman also notes similarities between the Mormon heavenly organization and post-Calvinism and Universalism.

Latter-day Saints note that Paul made reference to both "celestial bodies, and bodies terrestrial", as well as bodies compared to those of stars, when discussing the resurrection in 1st Corinthians 15:40-41 (KJV); they see this as evidence that the idea of "three degrees of glory" was preached by Paul.

== See also ==
- Divinization (Christian)
- Exaltation (Mormonism)
- King Follett discourse
- Mormon cosmology
- Salvation
- Universalism and the Latter Day Saint movement
