= Heavenly Mother (Mormonism) =

Mormon deity

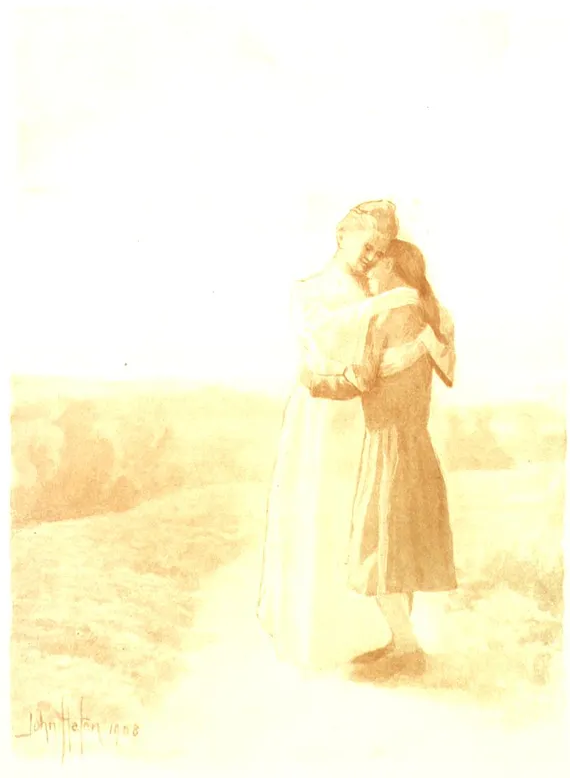
I've a Mother There by John Hafen

In the Latter Day Saint movement, Heavenly Mother, also known as Mother in Heaven, is the mother of human spirits and the wife of God the Father. Collectively Heavenly Mother and Father are called Heavenly Parents. Those who accept the Mother in Heaven doctrine trace its origins to Joseph Smith, founder of the Latter Day Saint movement. The doctrine became more widely known after Smith's death in 1844.

The Heavenly Mother doctrine is taught by the Church of Jesus Christ of Latter-day Saints (LDS Church), the Restoration Church of Jesus Christ, and branches of Mormon fundamentalism, such as the Fundamentalist Church of Jesus Christ of Latter-Day Saints. The doctrine is not generally recognized by other denominations within the Latter Day Saint movement, such as the Community of Christ, where trinitarianism is predominant.

In the LDS Church, the doctrine of "Heavenly Mother" or "heavenly parents" is not frequently discussed; however, the doctrine can be found in some church hymns and has been briefly discussed in church teaching manuals and several sermons.

== Origin of the theology ==
The theological underpinnings of a belief in Heavenly Mother are attributed to Joseph Smith, who shortly before his death in 1844 outlined a controversial view of God that differed dramatically from traditional Christian consensus. Smith's theology included the belief that God would share his glory with his children and that righteous couples might become exalted beings, or gods and goddesses, in the afterlife.

Although there is no known record of Smith explicitly teaching about Heavenly Mother, several of Smith's contemporaries attributed the theology to him either directly, or as a natural consequence of his theological stance. An 1845 edition of Times and Seasons includes W. W. Phelps' poem "Come to Me": "Come to me; here's the mysteries man hath not seen, Here's our Father in heaven, and Mother, the Queen." In addition, a 1911 secondhand account by Susa Young Gates states that in 1839, Smith had told Zina Diantha Huntington, after the death of her mother, that "not only would she know her mother again on the other side, but 'more than that, you will meet and become acquainted with your eternal Mother, the wife of your Father in Heaven'".

In addition, members of the Anointed Quorum, a highly select leadership group in the early church that was privy to Smith's teachings, also acknowledged the existence of a Heavenly Mother. The Times and Seasons published a letter to the editor from a pseudonymous person named "Joseph's Speckled Bird", in which the author stated that in the pre-Earth life, the spirit "was a child with his father and mother in heaven". The apostle Parley Pratt even taught in an official church periodical that God may have had multiple wives before Christ's time, and that after the death of Mary (the mother of Jesus) she may have become another eternal wife.

In 1845, after the death of Smith, the poet Eliza Roxey Snow published a poem entitled "My Father in Heaven" (later titled "Invocation, or the Eternal Father and Mother", now used as the lyrics in the Latter-day Saint hymn "O My Father"), which acknowledged the existence of a Heavenly Mother. The poem contained the following language:

In the heavens are parents single?
No, the thought makes reason stare.
Truth is reason: truth eternal
tells me I've a mother there.

When I leave this frail existence,
When I lay this mortal by,
Father, Mother, may I meet you
in your royal courts on high?

Some early Mormons considered Snow to be a prophetess. Later, church president Joseph F. Smith (a nephew of Joseph Smith) explained his own belief that "God revealed that principle that we have a mother as well as a father in heaven to Joseph Smith; Joseph Smith revealed it to Eliza Snow Smith, his wife; and Eliza Snow was inspired, being a poet, to put it into verse." A companion hymn "Our Mother in Heaven" was published in the church's Juvenile Instructor four decades later.

The doctrine is also attributed to several other early church leaders. According to one sermon by Brigham Young, Smith once said he "would not worship a God who had not a father; and I do not know that he would if he had not a mother; the one would be as absurd as the other."

=== Multiple Heavenly Mothers ===
Polygamy has played an important part in Mormon history and multiple Mormon denominations have teachings on the existence of a polygamous Heavenly Father married to multiple Heavenly Mothers. Brigham Young taught that God the Father was polygamous, although teachings on Heavenly Mothers were never as popular and disappeared from official rhetoric after the end of LDS polygamy in 1904 (although existing polygynous marriages lasted into the 1950s). Top leaders used the examples of the polygamy of God the Father in defense of the practice and this teaching was widely accepted by the late 1850s. Apostle Orson Pratt taught in an official church periodical that "We have now clearly shown that God the Father had a plurality of wives," and that after her death, Mary (the mother of Jesus) may have become another eternal polygamous wife of God. One scholar interpreted a 1976 LDS manual as alluding to this teaching. Author Carol Lynn Pearson stated that a seminary teacher from her youth fervently taught that there were multiple Heavenly Mothers. Another denomination, the Apostolic United Brethren, believes in multiple Mothers in Heaven.

== Worship and prayer to Heavenly Mother ==
Orson Pratt, an early apostle of the LDS Church, opposed worshiping a Heavenly Mother, because, he reasoned, like wives and children in any household, Heavenly Mother was required to "yield the most perfect obedience to" her husband.

Early leader George Q. Cannon thought that "there is too much of this inclination to deify 'our mother in heaven'", arguing that she is not part of the Godhead and that to worship her would detract from the worship of Heavenly Father. However, early 20th-century church leader Rudger Clawson disagreed, arguing that "it doesn't take away from our worship of the Eternal Father, to adore our Eternal Mother ... [W]e honor woman when we acknowledge Godhood in her eternal prototype."

Some church leaders have interpreted the term "God" to represent the divinely exalted couple with both a masculine and feminine half. Erastus Snow, an early Mormon apostle, wrote "'do you mean we should understand that Deity consists of a man and woman?' Most certainly I do. If I believe anything that God has ever said about himself ... I must believe that deity consists of a man and woman." This notion was reaffirmed by later church leaders Hugh B. Brown, James E. Talmage, Melvin J. Ballard, and Bruce R. McConkie.

Some Mormon feminists have adopted the practice of praying to the Heavenly Mother. However, LDS Church president Gordon B. Hinckley opposed this practice, saying that Mormons should not pray to the Heavenly Mother because Christ instructed his disciples to address the Heavenly Father in their prayers. When a feminist professor was fired from Brigham Young University in the 1990s, it was revealed that one of the reasons was her public advocacy of praying to Heavenly Mother. Other Mormon women have been excommunicated for similar publications such as teaching that Heavenly Mother is the Holy Ghost.

== Acknowledgment by the LDS Church ==
One early authoritative statement from the entire First Presidency on the subject is the "origin of man" letter on the 50th anniversary of Charles Darwin's Origin of Species. The church also later implied the theology in the 1995 statement "The Family: A Proclamation to the World", where the church officially stated that each person is a "spirit son or daughter of heavenly parents". Similarly, the 2019 version of the Young Women Theme reads, "I am a beloved daughter of heavenly parents, with a divine nature and eternal destiny." Other references to heavenly parents can be found in Latter-day Saint speeches and literature. In 2015, an official essay was published on the church website which surveyed 171 years of statements about a Mother in Heaven and confirmed that it is part of church doctrine.

=== Statements by church leaders ===
Various LDS Church leaders throughout the history of the church have spoken openly about the doctrine of a Heavenly Mother.

Brigham Young stated about Adam and Eve: "I tell you more, Adam is the father of our spirits ... [O]ur spirits and the spirits of all the heavenly family were begotten by Adam, and born of Eve. ... I tell you, when you see your Father in the Heavens, you will see Adam; when you see your Mother that bore your spirit, you will see Mother Eve." (Since the LDS Church has formally denounced since the 1970s the Adam–God doctrine as taught by Young, today this statement is doctrinal only to certain groups of Mormon fundamentalists.) Young also preached that resurrected "eternal mothers" would "be prepared to frame earths like unto ours".

Susa Young Gates, a daughter of Young and a women's rights activist, stated that the "great Heavenly Mother was the great molder" of Abraham's personality. "Gates speculated that Heavenly Mother has played a significant role in all our lives, looking over us with 'watchful care' and providing 'careful training.'"

Early 20th-century church leader B. H. Roberts pointed out that the Heavenly Mother doctrine presents a "conception of the nobility of women and of motherhood and of wife-hood—placing her side by side with the Divine Father." Apostle John A. Widtsoe, a contemporary of Roberts, wrote that the afterlife "is given radiant warmth by the thought that ... [we have] a mother who possesses the attributes of Godhood." In 1894, Juvenile Instructor, an official publication of the LDS Church, published a hymn entitled "Our Mother in Heaven". A 1925 First Presidency statement included the lines "All men and women are in the similitude of the universal Father and Mother. ... [M]an, as a spirit, was begotten and born of heavenly parents . ... [and] is capable, by experience through ages and aeons, of evolving into a God."

Spencer W. Kimball in 1978 described Heavenly Mother as "the ultimate in maternal modesty" with "restrained queenly elegance". At a 1991 general conference talk, Gordon B. Hinckley said, "Logic and reason would certainly suggest that if we have a Father in Heaven, we have a Mother in Heaven. That doctrine rests well with me." He added, "The fact that we do not pray to our Mother in Heaven in no way belittles or denigrates her."

There has also been some more recent discussion of Heavenly Mother by LDS Church leaders. In a speech given at BYU in 2010, Glenn L. Pace, a member of the LDS Church's First Quorum of the Seventy, said, "Sisters, I testify that when you stand in front of your heavenly parents in those royal courts on high and look into Her eyes and behold Her countenance, any question you ever had about the role of women in the kingdom will evaporate into the rich celestial air, because at that moment you will see standing directly in front of you, your divine nature and destiny."

== Controversy ==
According to historian Linda Wilcox, Heavenly Mother "is a shadowy and elusive belief floating around the edges of Mormon consciousness". The lack of focused teaching and more information about her has caused speculation among Mormons that this de-emphasis may have a divine purpose, such as to avoid drawing attention to her and to preserve the sacredness of her existence. In 1960, an LDS seminary teacher published in a Mormon encyclopedia that "the name of our Mother in Heaven has been withheld "because of the way God the Father's and Jesus Christ's names have been profaned.

Margaret Merrill Toscano writes that "[w]hile no General Authority has made an official statement denying belief in a Heavenly Mother nor stating that her existence is too sacred to discuss, several factors may influence the current trend that sees even a mention of Heavenly Mother as treading on forbidden ground. Members take their cues about what is acceptable doctrine from talks of General Authorities and official church manuals and magazines". These materials rarely mention Heavenly Mother directly. The publicly discussed church discipline of feminists like Lynne Kanavel Whitesides, Maxine Hanks, Janice Merrill Allred, and Margaret Toscano, all of whom were disciplined in part for statements related to the Heavenly Mother, may add to the general sense that discourse about her is strictly forbidden. However, Brigham Young University professor David L. Paulsen has argued that such a belief finds no official backing in statements by church leaders, and that the concept that the Heavenly Mother is consigned to a "sacred silence" is largely the result of a relatively recent cultural perception.

In 2016, McArthur Krishna and Bethany Brady Spalding wrote a children's book that discusses Heavenly Mother. Krishna said in an interview, "We all know that we have a Heavenly Mother. There’s no reason not to talk about this, and to celebrate what we know." Krishna pushed back against the idea of sacred silence by saying, "Not once ... did a general authority ever say that we cannot speak of her because of her supposedly fragile nature. She is a goddess in might and dignity. And to consider her otherwise, I think, is disrespectful to Her."

Though LDS Church president Gordon B. Hinckley has said the prohibition on praying to Heavenly Mother in no way "belittles or denigrates her", some feel that it makes her seem less important than Heavenly Father. Others assume that both heavenly parents are equally important and expect that more will be revealed when humanity is ready. Mormon fundamentalists believe that Heavenly Father has multiple wives, and that although humankind shares the same Heavenly Father, they do not all share the same Heavenly Mother.

The question of how Heavenly Mother is regarded ties into a larger set of questions among many Mormons about power in relationships between men and women. When asked why God said that Adam would rule over Eve, Hinckley said, "I do not know ... My own interpretation of that sentence is that the husband shall have a governing responsibility to provide for, to protect, to strengthen and shield the wife. Any man who belittles or abuses or terrorizes, or who rules in unrighteousness, will deserve and, I believe, receive the reprimand of a just God who is the Eternal Father of both His sons and daughters." Hinckley then went on to reaffirm the equality of men and women: "Each is a creation of the Almighty, mutually dependent and equally necessary for the continuation of the race. Every new generation in the history of mankind is a testimony of the necessity for both man and woman."

Author Charlotte Scholl Shurtz stated that the LDS Church's emphasis on Heavenly Parents as a cisgender, heterosexual couple excludes transgender, nonbinary, and intersex members and enshrines heteronormativity and cisnormativity. She further said that current teachings ignore transgender, non-binary, and intersex people, and further deny exaltation and godhood to non-cisgender individuals. Former BYU professor Kerry Spencer Pray stated the teachings on heterosexual, patriarchal Heavenly Parents alienates queer and single people like her, and that Heavenly Mother does not communicate with Her children, and is presided over by Her husband. Mormon scholar Margaret Toscano said LDS teachings frame Heavenly Mother not as an individual, but subsumes her into the Heavenly Parent patriarchal family. Authors Bethany Brady Spalding and McArthur Krishna argued that the idea that a Heavenly Mother is too sacred to speak about in the LDS Church is culturally nonsense.

== Reported visions ==
Heavenly Mother is absent in the visionary experiences in Mormon scriptures. The only recorded visionary experience is related by Zebedee Coltrin and recorded in the journal of Abraham H. Cannon.

One day the Prophet Joseph asked him [Coltrin] and Sidney Rigdon to accompany him into the woods to pray. When they had reached a secluded spot Joseph laid down on his back and stretched out his arms. He told the brethren to lie one on each arm, and then shut their eyes. After they had prayed he told them to open their eyes. They did so and saw a brilliant light surrounding a pedestal which seemed to rest on the earth. They closed their eyes and again prayed. They then saw, on opening them, the Father seated upon a throne; they prayed again and on looking saw the Mother also; after praying and looking the fourth time they saw the Savior added to the group.

== Heavenly Parents ==
Heavenly Parents is the term used in Mormonism to refer collectively to the divine partnership of God the Father and Heavenly Mother who are believed to be parents of human spirits. The Heavenly Parents doctrine has been taught by the LDS Church, the Restoration Church of Jesus Christ, and branches of Mormon fundamentalism, such as the Apostolic United Brethren. The doctrine of a husband and wife spiritual parents is not generally recognized by other denominations within the Latter Day Saint movement, such as the Community of Christ.

In the largest denomination of Mormonism, the LDS Church, the doctrine of "heavenly parents" is not frequently discussed; however, the doctrine can be found in some publications and hymns. "Oh, What Songs of the Heart" (LDS hymn #286) "We Meet Again As Sisters" (LDS hymn #311), and "The Family: A Proclamation to the World" mention or refer to "heavenly parents". Various LDS Church curriculum materials refer to a heavenly Mother. In 1845, after the death of Smith, the poet Eliza Roxcy Snow published a poem now used as the lyrics in the Latter-day Saint hymn "O My Father", which discusses heavenly parents.

Top LDS leaders in the 1800s seemed to accept the idea of a Heavenly Father and Mother pairing as common sense. According to one sermon by Brigham Young, Smith once said he "would not worship a God who had not a father; and I do not know that he would if he had not a mother; the one would be as absurd as the other." In 1995 top LDS leaders released "The Family: A Proclamation to the World", which outlined key teachings on family and gender, and which affirms, "All human beings—male and female—are created in the image of God. Each is a beloved spirit son or daughter of heavenly parents, and, as such, each has a divine nature and destiny." Since 2019, the LDS church's theme for its Young Women's program says: "I am a beloved daughter of Heavenly Parents, with a divine nature and eternal destiny." The LDS Church teaches that humanity's Heavenly Parents want Their children to be like Them, and that through the process of exaltation all humans have the potential to live eternally in Their presence, continue as families, become gods, create worlds, and have their own spirit children over which they will govern as divine parents.

== See also ==
- Asherah
- Divine Mother
- Great Mother
- Mormon cosmology
- Mormon feminism
- Mormon folklore
- Mother goddess
- Queen of Heaven
- Shaktism
- Sophia
- Sophiology
- Thealogy
