= Adam–God doctrine =

Former Church of Jesus Christ of Latter-Day Saints theological doctrine

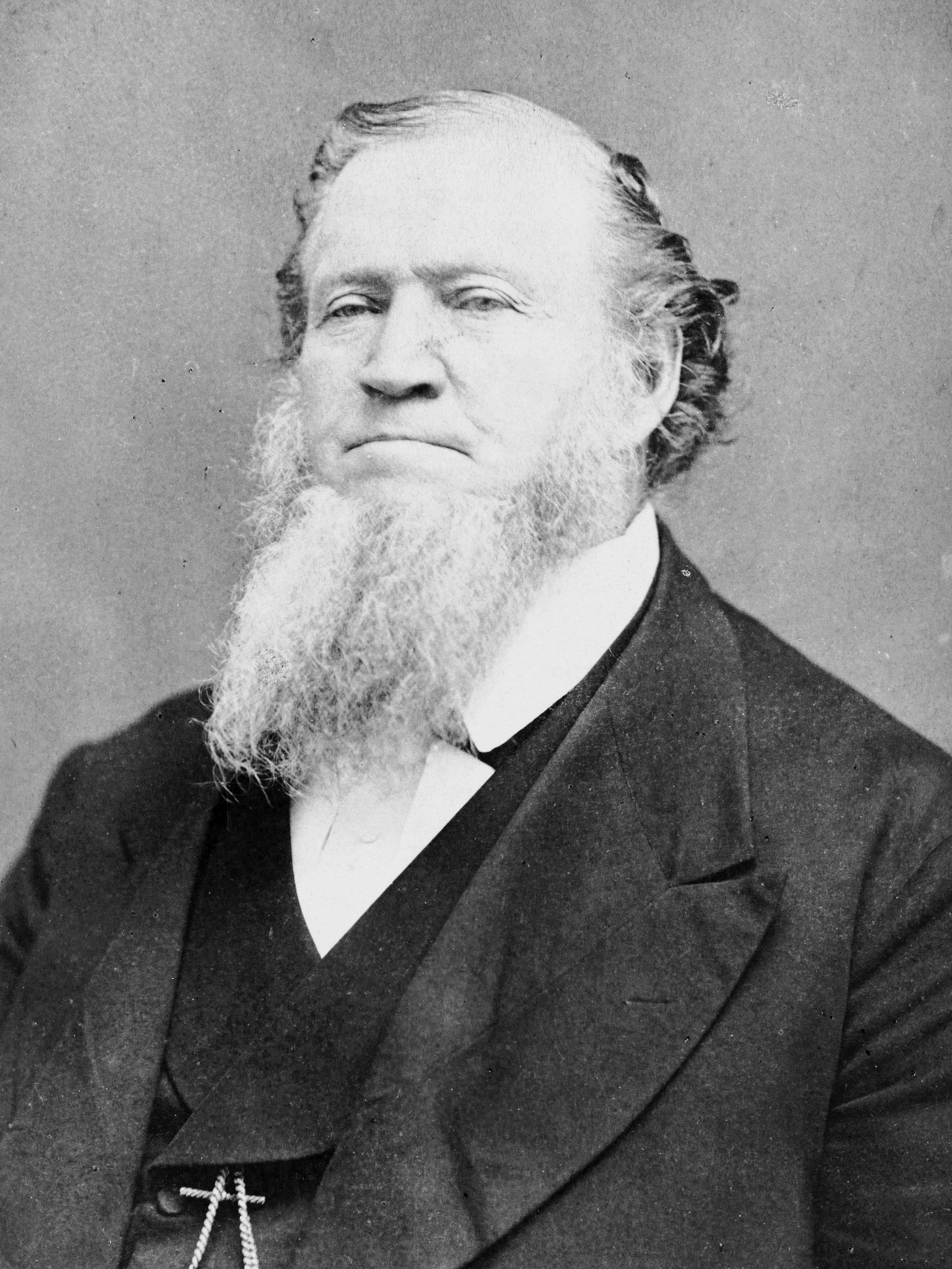
Brigham Young, the second president of The Church of Jesus Christ of Latter-day Saints, laid the foundation for the Adam-God theory with his original doctrinal statements.

The Adam–God doctrine (or Adam–God theory) was a theological idea taught in mid-19th century Mormonism by Brigham Young, a president of the Church of Jesus Christ of Latter-day Saints (LDS Church). Although the doctrine is rejected by the LDS Church today, it is still an accepted part of the theology of some Mormon fundamentalists.

According to Young, he was taught by Joseph Smith that Adam is "our Father and our God, and the only God with whom we have to do."

According to the doctrine, Adam was once a mortal man who became resurrected and exalted. From another planet, he then came as Michael to form Earth. Adam then was given a physical body and a spouse, Eve, where they became mortal by eating the forbidden fruit in the Garden of Eden. After bearing mortal children and establishing the human race, Adam and Eve returned to their heavenly thrones, where Adam serves as God and is the Heavenly Father of humankind. Later, Adam returned to the Earth to the ancient prophets and to become the literal biological father of Jesus.

During the 19th century and the early 20th century, the Adam–God doctrine was featured as part of the church's endowment ceremony. However, the notion was startling to many people when it was introduced and remained controversial, even within the Church. Many Latter Day Saints and some breakoff groups, the most notable being apostle Orson Pratt, rejected the doctrine in favor of more traditional understanding of Adam and Eve. Both he and other members, such as Edward Bunker, would face the prospect of ecclesiastical punishment for their public opposition. Despite the objection of many, the doctrine persisted even after the administration of Brigham Young. His successor, John Taylor, privately affirmed his belief in the idea prior to his death in 1887. It wasn’t until about 1905 that the Adam-God doctrine was fully removed from the endowment ceremony. By this time, the doctrine fell out of favor within the LDS Church and was replaced by a theology more similar to Orson Pratt's, as expounded by turn-of-the century Latter Day Saint theologians James E. Talmage, B. H. Roberts, and John A. Widtsoe. In 1976, church president Spencer W. Kimball stated the LDS Church does not support the doctrine. Most Latter Day Saints accept Adam as "the Ancient of Days," "father of all," and Michael the Archangel but do not recognize him as being God the Father.

In contrast, many Mormon Fundamentalists have retained this doctrine as a chief principle of their faith. Several Fundamentalist authors, such as Ogden Kraut and Joseph W. Musser have written books on the subject highlighting the prominent role of Adam continues to play.

It is debated whether or not Brigham Young did actually teach this theory as doctrine. There are some instances where it was written that he taught it during a sermon, but it could have been the result of misinterpretations or clerical errors. In Wilford Woodruff’s May 14, 1876 journal entry he recorded Brigham teaching “Adam was Michael the archangel, and was the father of Jesus Christ in the flesh.”

== Background ==
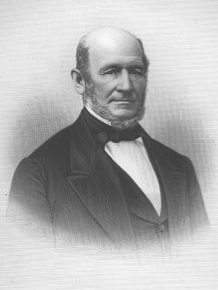
Heber C. Kimball, the First Counselor in the First Presidency of The Church of Jesus Christ of Latter-day Saints between 1847 and 1868, is credited with at least partial authorship of the Adam-God theory.

Though Joseph Smith, the founder of the Latter Day Saint movement, never used the term "Adam–God" in any of his recorded public statements, he provided several teachings from which the doctrine's adherents draw support. For example, Smith taught in an 1839 sermon that Adam was actually the archangel Michael, who held the First Presidency in the premortal life. In the same sermon, Smith taught that Adam holds "the keys of the universe," and so it is through his authority that all priesthood "keys," the abilities to unlock particular priesthood powers, are revealed from heaven. In 1840, Smith taught that Adam is the one "through whom Christ has been revealed from heaven, and will continue to be revealed from henceforth." Finally, Smith taught in his 1844 King Follett discourse that God was once a man "like one of us."

Young and other adherents of the doctrine claim that Smith was its originator and that Smith privately taught it to them before his death, in 1844. However, the prevailing academic view is that the doctrine taught by Young and others was an elaboration of Smith's vague references to Adam's unique role in Latter Day Saint doctrine. Although Young is generally credited with originating the doctrine, the original source may also have been Young's counselor in the First Presidency, Heber C. Kimball.

== Description ==
The Adam–God doctrine teaches that Adam is the father of both the spirits and physical bodies of all humans born on Earth, including Jesus.

Under the doctrine, Adam had a number of roles. First, he was a creator god. He and his wife, Eve, had become gods by living a mortal life, becoming resurrected, and receiving their exaltation. As a god before the creation of the Earth, he was known as Michael, or the "Ancient of Days." Michael was not the only creator god, however, as he was a member of a council of Earth's creator gods, which also included the gods "Elohim" and "Jehovah." In Smith's original endowment ceremony, the gods involved in the creation were called "Elohim, Jehovah, and Michael," but unlike in modern Latter Day Saint theology, "Jehovah" was not identified as Jesus. Rather, it was explained by Joseph F. Smith that "Elohim, Jehovah and Michael are Father, Son, and Grandson. They made this Earth and Michael became Adam." Within the council, Jehovah and Michael were subordinate to Elohim and created the Earth, under the direction of Elohim. Michael was selected by the heads of this council of gods to be the Father of this Earth.

Also, the doctrine teaches that Michael was the father of the spirits in heaven who are associated with this Earth. With Eve, and possibly his other wives, Michael had fathered the spirits of spirit offspring in the preexistence.

Next, the doctrine teaches that Michael came to the Earth with one of his wives, where they became known as Adam and Eve, and became the progenitor of the human race and the father of mortal bodies of all his spirit offspring so that they could progress and achieve godhood like themselves. The names "Adam" and "Eve" are titles that reflect their roles as the parents of humanity, Adam meaning man or "[father] of mankind" and Eve meaning the "mother[s] of all living."The privilege of peopling the Earth was part of Adam and Eve's eternal purpose as exalted beings and eternal parents of their spirit children. To bear mortal children, Adam and Eve had to take on mortal bodies. The bodies of Adam and Eve fell to a mortal state when they ate the fruit of tree of knowledge of good and evil in the Garden of Eden.

Then, the doctrine teaches that after his mortal existence, Adam returned to his throne and reigned as the immortal God of this Earth. He is thus considered to be the Biblical God of Israel. Smith stated that Adam's ascension to godhood took place at or after a gathering at a holy place of the same name. Smith taught that a similar gathering is to prelude the second coming of Christ.

Finally, the doctrine teaches that Michael/Adam was the literal, biological father of the mortal body of Jesus.

== History ==
=== Brigham Young's 1852 explanation ===
Whether or not Smith had taught the doctrine, the first recorded explanation of the doctrine using the term "Adam–God" was by Young, who first taught the doctrine at the church's spring general conference on April 9, 1852. This sermon was recorded stenographically by George D. Watt, Young's private secretary, who was an expert in Pitman shorthand. Watt published the sermon in 1854 in the British periodical Journal of Discourses, which was endorsed by Young and his counselors in the church's First Presidency.

In Watt's transcript of the sermon, Young said he intended to discuss "who it was that begat the Son of the Virgin Mary," a subject which he said "has remained a mystery in this kingdom up to this day." The transcript reads:

When our father Adam came into the garden of Eden, he came into it with a celestial body, and brought Eve, one of his wives, with him. He helped to make and organize this world. He is MICHAEL, the Archangel, the ANCIENT OF DAYS! about whom holy men have written and spoken—He is our FATHER and our GOD, and the only God with whom WE have to do. Every man upon the earth, professing Christians or non-professing, must hear it, and will know it sooner or later.

The transcript then reads: "When the Virgin Mary conceived the child Jesus, the Father had begotten him in his own likeness. He was not begotten by the Holy Ghost. And who is the Father? He is the first of the human family." Young explained that Adam "was begotten by his Father in heaven" in the same way that Adam begat his own sons and daughters, and that there were "three distinct characters, namely, Eloheim, Yahovah, and Michael." Then, reiterating, he said that "Jesus, our elder brother, was begotten in the flesh by the same character that was in the Garden of Eden, and who is our Father in Heaven."

Young concluded, "I could tell you much more about this; but were I to tell you the whole truth, blasphemy would be nothing to it, in the estimation of the superstitious and overrighteous mankind. Now, let all who may hear these doctrines, pause before they make light of them, or treat them with indifference, for they will prove their salvation or damnation."

=== Further development by Young ===
In a special conference on August 28, 1852, Young explained in greater detail the mechanism by which celestial beings like Adam and Eve could give birth to mortal offspring. According to Young, when a couple first become gods and goddesses, they first begin to create spiritual offspring. Then, they begin creating "mortal tabernacles" in which those spirits can dwell, by going to a newly created world, where they: "eat and drink of the fruits of the corporal world, until this grosser matter is diffused sufficiently through their celestial bodies, to enable them according to the established laws to produce mortal tabernacles for their spiritual children." (Young 1852b, p. 13) This is what Adam and Eve did, Young said, and "Adam is my Father." (Young 1852b, p. 13)

On February 19, 1854, Young reiterated the doctrine in a sermon. He also reiterated the doctrine at the October 1854 general conference, in a sermon that was reported to have "held the vast audience as it were spellbound." In the October conference, Young is reported as clarifying that Adam and Eve were "natural father and mother of every spirit that comes to this planet, or that receives tabernacles on this planet, consequently we are brother and sisters, and that Adam was God, our Eternal Father."

When Young discussed the doctrine again in early 1857, he emphasized again that "to become acquainted with our Father and our God" was "one of the first principles of the doctrine of salvation", and that "no man can enjoy or be prepared for eternal life without that knowledge." Nevertheless, he later said:

Whether Adam is the personage that we should consider Our Heavenly Father, or not, is considerable of a mystery to a good many. I do not care for one moment how that is; it is no matter whether we are to consider Him our God, or whether His Father, or his Grandfather, for in either case we are of one species of one family and Jesus Christ is also of our species.

=== Initial reactions to the doctrine ===
The reaction within the Latter Day Saint community to Young's Adam–God teachings was mixed. While many accepted the doctrine, others regarded it as misguided, or interpreted it to adhere to their prior understanding.

Young's initial 1852 announcement of the doctrine was greeted by some as prophetic. For example, the clerk of the conference, Thomas Bullock, recorded that during Young's sermon, "the Holy Ghost rest[ed] upon him with great power." In a session of general conference the next day, Heber C. Kimball stated his agreement that "the God and Father of Jesus Christ was Adam." Another apostle, Franklin D. Richards, accepted the doctrine "that Adam is our Father and our God" as well, stating in a conference held in June 1854 that "the Prophet and Apostle Brigham has declared it, and that it is the word of the Lord."

Kimball readily adopted Young's views, and preached on June 29, 1856, that "I have learned by experience that there is but one God that pertains to this people, and He is the God that pertains to this earth—the first man. That first man sent his own Son to redeem the world."

A number of hymns acknowledging this doctrine were sung in local congregations of the LDS Church. One published in 1856, entitled "We Believe in Our God", stated: "We believe in our God the great Prince of His race, / The Archangel Michael, the Ancient of Days, / Our own Father Adam, earth's Lord, as is plain." This hymn was not found in the previous or subsequent editions of the same hymnal.

The first line of a poem published in 1861, titled "Sons of Michael", stated: "Sons of Michael, he approaches! / Rise; the Eternal Father greet." The poem is included as a hymn in the current LDS Church hymnal, but the wording has been altered from "Eternal Father" to "ancient father".

Acceptance of the doctrine by the LDS Church continued through the 19th century. George Q. Cannon, a member of the First Presidency, when asked by his son about the conception of Jesus by Mary, asked "What was to prevent Father Adam from visiting and overshadowing the mother of Jesus[?]"

=== Resistance to the doctrine ===
However, some prominent members of the church took issue with the doctrine. Most significantly, apostle and philosopher Orson Pratt disagreed with the doctrine, and expressed that disagreement publicly and in private meetings with other apostles. Pratt also published his disagreement in his publication The Seer for which he was censured.

Pratt did, however, teach similar doctrines in the same publication. For example, he stated that on the way to exaltation, one would have to "pass by" and "pay tribute to" various apostles and prophets, then Jesus, and "at length ... Father Adam." He said many would be surprised and humiliated, after passing by Jesus, to find "Father Adam" standing there; however, he said, "those are ideas which do not concern us at present, although it is written in the Bible—'This is eternal life, to know thee the only true God, and Jesus Christ whom thou hast sent.'"

Pratt continued to debate the issue in public forums for months, despite being rebuked privately and publicly by Young on more than one occasion (Bergera 1980, pp. 13–16), until 1860, when faced with possible disfellowshipment from the church for teaching false doctrine, Pratt agreed to the language of a public confession affirming the doctrine as "the doctrine of the church." This confession was negotiated during a series of meetings among the church hierarchy (Bergera 1980).

A less open opposition to the doctrine may have been carried out by Latter Day Saint editors Samuel W. Richards and Franklin D. Richards who, according to one researcher, interpreted the idea of Adam being "our God" or "our Father" as meaning merely that Adam, as the first mortal man, stands at the head of the human family. For instance, "the Lord made Moses a god to Pharaoh" (Exodus 7:1) and as Paul was "as Christ Jesus" to the Galatians (4:14). In this way, Adam as our great progenitor, will preside over the human family as "father and God."

=== Adam–God in Young's later administration ===
After the public debates between Young and Pratt subsided in 1860, Young continued to maintain his belief in the doctrine, but may have been disappointed that the people did not give the doctrine universal acceptance. In 1861, he stated:

Some years ago, I advanced a doctrine with regard to Adam being our father and God, that will be a curse to many of the Elders of Israel because of their folly. With regard to it they yet grovel in darkness and will. It is one of the most glorious revealments of the economy of heaven, yet the world hold derision. Had I revealed the doctrine of baptism from [sic] the dead instead [of] Joseph Smith there are men around me who would have ridiculed the idea until dooms day [sic?]. But they are ignorant and stupid like the dumb ass.

Nevertheless, Young and the Quorum of the Twelve Apostles continued to discuss the doctrine. In 1873, Young again taught the doctrine publicly, and indicated that when Adam came to the Earth, he left behind many wives other than Eve at the place from which Adam came; however, he said he was "not disposed to give any farther knowledge concerning ... the great and glorious doctrine that pertains to this." "How much unbelief exists in the minds of the Latter-day Saints in regard to one particular doctrine which is revealed to them, and which God revealed to me—namely that Adam is our father and God .... Our Father Adam is the man who stands at the gate and holds the keys of everlasting life and salvation to all his children who have or ever will come upon the earth."

Just before his death, Young took steps to ensure that the Adam–God doctrine was taught in the church's temples as part of the endowment ceremony. In 1877, while he was standardizing the endowment for use in the St. George Temple, Young introduced as part of the endowment the "lecture at the veil." The final draft of the lecture is today kept private in the St. George Temple. L. John Nuttall, Young's secretary, recorded in his journal a transcription of Young's temple lecture regarding the Adam-God doctrine. A portion of that journal entry reads as follows:

Adam was an immortal being when he came on this earth he had lived on an earth similar to ours … and had begotten all the spirit that was to come to this earth and Eve our common Mother who is the mother of all living bore those spirits in the celestial world .... Father Adam's oldest son (Jesus the Saviour) who is the heir of the family is Father Adams first begotten in the spirit World. who according to the flesh is the only begotten as it is written. In his divinity he having gone back into the spirit World and come in the spirit [glory] to Mary and she conceived for when Adam and Eve got through with their Work in this earth. They did not lay their bodies down in the dust, but returned to the spirit World from whence they came.

=== After Young's death ===
There is some controversy as to whether or not Young considered Adam–God to be official church doctrine. At the end of his 1852 sermon, he stated, "Now, let all who may hear these doctrines, pause before they make light of them, or treat them with indifference, for they will prove their salvation or damnation." Nevertheless, in 1854, after a great deal of controversy concerning the doctrine, Young minimized the importance of the doctrine, stating that the "subject ... does not immediately concern yours or my welfare ... I do not pretend to say that the items of doctrine and ideas I shall advance are necessary for the people to know."

After Young's death, church leaders began to cast the various interpretations of this teaching as mere speculation and denied that any particular interpretation was binding on the church. In 1897, Joseph F. Smith, then an apostle and counselor in the First Presidency, wrote a private letter concerning Young's teachings on Adam, stating:

The doctrine was never submitted to the councils of the Priesthood nor to the church for approval or ratification, and was never formally or otherwise accepted by the church. It is therefore in no sense binding upon the Church. Brigham Young's "bare mention" was "without indubitable evidence and authority being given of its truth." Only the scripture, the "accepted word of God," is the Church's standard.

Beginning around 1892, church leaders privately decided to no longer publicly teach the doctrine. In a private meeting held on April 4, 1897, church president Wilford Woodruff said. "Adam is our father and God and no use to discuss it with [the] Josephites [Reorganized Church of Jesus Christ of Latter Day Saints] or any one else."

In 1892, the doctrine was publicly opposed in St. George, Utah, by Edward Bunker. The First Presidency—Woodruff, George Q. Cannon, and Joseph F. Smith—traveled to St. George to address the issue. Records of the meeting state that Bunker was corrected: "Pres Woodruff and Cannon showed ... that Adam was an immortal being when he came to this earth and was made the same as all other men and Gods are made." "The doctrine preached and contended for by Father Edward Bunker of Bunkerville was investigated, condemned and Father Bunker set right. Presidents Woodruff and Cannon present."

After the start of the 20th century, church leaders openly took the position that the doctrine should no longer to be taught publicly.

As early as 1902, apostle Charles W. Penrose claimed, "The Church of Jesus Christ of Latter-day Saints has never formulated or adopted any theory concerning the subject treated upon by President Young as to Adam."

=== Current position of the LDS Church ===
Eventually, the doctrine was publicly denounced as false by LDS Church leaders. In 1976, church president Spencer W. Kimball stated, "We denounce that theory and hope that everyone will be cautioned against this and other kinds of false doctrine."

In 1980, apostle Bruce R. McConkie gave a speech elaborating upon the church's position towards the Adam–God theory:

There are those who believe or say they believe that Adam is our father and our god, that he is the father of our spirits and our bodies, and that he is the one we worship.

The devil keeps this heresy alive as a means of obtaining converts to cultism. It is contrary to the whole plan of salvation set forth in the scriptures, and anyone who has read the Book of Moses, and anyone who has received the temple endowment and who yet believes the Adam–God theory does not deserve to be saved.* Those who are so ensnared reject the living prophet and close their ears to the apostles of their day. "We will follow those who went before." they say. And having so determined, they soon are ready to enter polygamous relationships that destroy their souls.

We worship the Father, in the name of the Son, by the power of the Holy Ghost; and Adam is their foremost servant, by whom the peopling of our planet was commenced.

Later the same year, apostle Mark E. Petersen stated:

Adam was not our God, nor was he our Savior. But he was the humble servant of both in his status as an angel.

God had only one begotten son in the flesh. But Adam had many, including Cain and Abel and Seth. He lived nearly a thousand years. He could have had hundreds of children in that time.

Then how could it be said by anyone that he had "an only begotten" son? How could all of his other children be accounted for? Were they not all begotten in the flesh?

Were Cain and Abel and Seth and their brothers and sisters all orphans? Was any child ever begotten without a father? Adam was their father, and he had many sons. In no way whatever does he qualify as a father who had only one son in the flesh.

Yet God our Eternal Father had only one son in the flesh, who was Jesus Christ.

Then was Adam our God, or did God become Adam? Ridiculous!

Adam was neither God nor the Only Begotten Son of God. He was a child of God in the spirit as we all are (see Acts 17:29). Jesus was the firstborn in the spirit, and the only one born to God in the flesh.

If any of you have been confused by false teachers who come among us, if you have been assailed by advocates of erroneous doctrines, counsel with your priesthood leaders. They will not lead you astray, but will direct you into paths of truth and salvation.

=== Acceptance by Mormon fundamentalists ===
Today, few Latter Day Saint denominations still believe in the Adam-God Doctrine because it has been repudiated by many leaders and theologians. However, adherents of Mormon fundamentalism generally accept the Adam–God doctrine.

The mainstream LDS Church's disavowal of the doctrine contributes to what fundamentalists perceive to be a general intellectual or spiritual retreat from important principles that were rejected due to unpopularity. Along with the practice of plural marriage, belief in the Adam–God doctrine became a defining aspect of the Mormon fundamentalist movement. The main belief of the Mormon fundamentalist (FLDS) is plural marriage. Mormon fundamentalists generally believe they are adhering to original church doctrines.

==== Apostolic United Brethren ====
The Apostolic United Brethren (AUB), a fundamentalist Mormon group, accepts the Adam–God teaching. Their leader Joseph W. Musser wrote a book on the topic the 1930s, titled Michael, Our Father and Our God. In the book, Musser contended that the rejection of the doctrine by the LDS Church can be linked to its rejection of plural marriage, which occurred around the same time:

And let us here remind the reader that as long as belief in the Patriarchal order of marriage and other advanced principles of the Gospel was maintained, the minds of the Saints were open and receptive. ... But with the surrender of the glorious principle of Celestial Marriage—a union for time and eternity—came darkness, mental drowsiness, a detour from the Gospel path, until all sorts of speculation pertaining to the plan of Salvation was indulged in.

==== School of the Prophets ====
The School of the Prophets a small branch led by Robert Crossfield and headquartered in Salem, Utah, claims revelation showing that Young was inaccurate in some points of his Adam–God teachings, but otherwise he was correct. The understanding from these revelations is that Jesus was the Only Begotten Son in the flesh of the Savior of the previous Earth where the father of all Spirits, Michael/Adam, had his mortal probation. The lineage of Michael/Adam, which includes all but Jesus on this Earth, will never become saviors of worlds. Thus the Adam–God doctrine of Young is simply a fuller understanding of the New Testament doctrine of joint-heirs with Christ. The Crossfield denomination was described in the book Under the Banner of Heaven, among other works.

== See also ==
- Adam and Eve (LDS Church)
- Adam Kadmon
- Criticism of the Church of Jesus Christ of Latter-day Saints
- Mormon cosmology
