= Plan of salvation =

Christian concept

The plan of salvation is a Christian concept regarding God's plan to save humanity from sin and its consequences. It occurs first in the New Testament, for example in the Gospel of Matthew and the Gospel of Mark, although some scholars consider the idea fully developed first in the Gospel of Luke.

According to some writers, this plan of salvation is equivalent to the idea of a divine economy in history. This idea is developed by Ignatius, Augustine and Johann Albrecht Bengel.
