= Agency in Mormonism =

Latter-day Saints theology concept

Agency (also referred to as moral agency), in the theology of the Church of Jesus Christ of Latter-day Saints (LDS Church), is "the privilege of choice which was introduced by God the Eternal Father to all of his spirit children in the premortal state". Mortal life is viewed as a test of faith, where our choices are central to the plan of salvation in Latter-day Saint teaching. "It was essential for their eternal progression that they be subjected to the influences of both good and evil". LDS Church members believe that Lucifer rebelled against the God's plan, which resulted in the War in Heaven, and Lucifer being cast out of heaven and becoming Satan.

Church members believe that all individuals have the ability to differentiate between good and evil and that Satan and his followers are not able to tempt people beyond the point where they can resist. This implies that mortals can be held accountable for their actions; mortals will be judged by God based on a combination of one's faith and works (with salvation coming only through the power, mercy, and grace of Jesus Christ).

== Pre-Earth life ==
A major difference between the beliefs of the LDS Church and many other Christians involves the belief of a life before mortality, referred to as the pre-Earth life, pre-mortal life, or pre-existence. Latter-day Saints believe that before the Earth was created, all mankind lived as spirit children of God. Here, God nurtured, taught and provided means for their development. This preparation would allow them to later become the men and women of Earth, to be further educated and tested in the schoolhouse of mortality in order to return to God's presence and become like him. Thus, the pre-existent life is believed to have been a period of unknown length of progression, and schooling. Church members believe that there came a time when we could not progress further without being born into a body and experiencing earthly life.

According to LDS Church doctrine, God proposed a plan whereby further progression could take place, a plan of salvation. Since agency would allow all people to fall in sin, a savior was necessary to atone for the sins of each person so that they could return to live with God. Jehovah (the pre-mortal Jesus) volunteered to follow the plan as outlined, which preserved agency, accountability for action, and the necessary result that some of God's children would never to return to heaven as a consequence of sin. The second volunteer, Lucifer, attempted to amend the plan by proposing that all mankind would return to God despite their sins—essentially defeating agency and the divine principle of accountability for action. God the Father chose to send Jehovah as the Savior to fulfill his plan. Lucifer and his followers rebelled against this plan and were eventually cast out of heaven. Lucifer became Satan.

=== Foreordination ===
LDS Church members believe that agency was given to all of God's spirit children during the pre-mortal life. Some of the spirit children of God exercised their agency and chose to follow God's law and became "noble and great." This doctrine is called "foreordination". God foreordained some of these spirits to particular stations in life in order to advance His plan to lead humanity back to His presence.

Latter-day Saints believe that these foreordinations were not unalterable decrees, but rather callings from God for man to perform specific missions in mortality. Even these who were foreordained for greatness could fall and transgress the laws of God. Therefore, mortality is simply a state wherein progression and testing is continued from what began in the pre-mortal life.

Church doctrine states that God's plan includes the foreordination of prophets and teachers who have gifts and callings to teach and re-teach correct principles so that agency can be used wisely. God's plan includes the important role of parents to teach their children the path of righteousness and happiness, and the blessing of the holy scriptures to give a foundation of gospel knowledge, including the knowledge of the saving role of Jesus Christ and the importance of ordinances and covenants of the gospel.

== Earth life ==
In essence, agency is the ability to make choices for oneself, as well as the ability to learn the difference between right and wrong and to make ethical and moral decisions.

David O. McKay, a church president, stated, "It is the purpose of the Lord that man become like Him. In order for man to achieve this it was necessary for the Creator first to make him free." Without agency, mortality would be useless. People are ultimately responsible for their own destiny, through their faith and obedience to the commandments of God. "Agency" therefore should not be interpreted to mean that actions are without consequences; agency is a gift from God and consequences must necessarily come as a result of choices made. Agency and accountability are complementary and cannot be separated.

This principle holds that it is wrong to compel someone to use his or her agency in a certain way unless they have abused it - especially to infringe against the agency of another - as it would prevent a person from enacting their own choices. Such offenses logically include, but are not limited to, crimes such as murder, rape, and slavery. Furthermore, a person who prevents an individual from doing what they have been commanded to do or forces them to do something that is wrong will likewise be held responsible for any offense.

Throughout the 20th century, church leaders often equated governments led by dictatorships as being under the influence and control of Satan. For example, apostle Ezra Taft Benson often spoke of evil communist or socialist dictatorships that threatened mankind: "it is realized that communism is turning out to be the earthly image of the plan which Satan presented in the preexistence. The whole program of socialistic communism is essentially a war against God and the plan of salvation—the very plan which we fought to uphold during the war in heaven." Other leaders clarified these statements, often pointing to the church's belief in the "Law of Consecration" which is a form of non-dictatorial socialism practiced by early church members in which all property was held in common and distributed by church leaders based on the needs of each individual. The Church is officially politically neutral and today church members around the world subscribe to a variety of political beliefs, including communism and socialism.

LDS doctrine teaches that many men and women since the beginning of mortal time have used their agency unwisely, limiting their own progress and their opportunity to receive light and knowledge. Beginning with Cain, some have used their agency to inflict harm, abuse, tyranny, slavery, or death upon others, contrary to the will and commandments of God.

The fact that God allows these actions does not mean that He condones them. LDS doctrine holds that agency is an eternal principle, and that God has provided the way through the atonement of Jesus Christ whereby men and women can repent of their wrongful acts of commission or of omission, and come back into the path of receiving further light and knowledge through making right choices. The atonement of Christ and the plan of compassion among men also provides a way whereby those who have been harmed by the sinful actions of others may be healed in a spiritual sense, although this may take great patience and long-suffering, and often requires the help of others.

The Pearl of Great Price, one of the scriptures of the LDS Church, states that Satan, the great deceiver, sought during premortal life to destroy the agency of man, and that he continues to seek to enslave men, women, and children in whatever ways that he can in this world, to "lead them captive at his will." LDS doctrine teaches that whatever leads in this world to enslavement, addiction, or forced unrighteous behavior is ultimately instigated by Satan. God allows these conditions because of the agency He has given to man, but He expects men to overcome evil by doing good among the society in which they live. God holds men and women responsible and accountable in relation to the light and knowledge they have. Every person born into the world is given the light of Christ, also called conscience, to guide each person in choosing good from evil.

LDS doctrine also holds that whenever gospel knowledge has been lost or limited among portions of mankind, this has come about because of the unrighteousness of the people and their leaders, as described by the prophet Isaiah in the Bible.

LDS leaders teach that family and societal relationships are a part of mortal life for many purposes, including the need to learn to show love, acceptance, and compassion in ways that continue to allow agency. They teach that unrighteous dominion is never acceptable to God, and that with the agency given to men is the expectation that when they marry, they will treat their wife and children with love, respect, tenderness, and material and emotional support. LDS leaders teach that men should treat women as equal partners in all decisions in the family.

=== "Free" agency ===
The term “free agency” is commonly used, and has traditionally been interpreted as meaning that individuals have the ability to choose their actions freely. Many leaders of the LDS Church have pointed out that the term "free agency" is technically incorrect, and regardless, should not be interpreted to mean that agency does not have consequences, but rather that agency is fraught with risk and choices (the result of the exercise of agency) that determine eternal destination. Consequently, current church manuals avoid the term "free agency" and instead refer simply to "agency." Some church leaders favor the term "moral agency".

A reference to "free agency" found in the 1886 Revelation has been noted by some Mormon fundamentalists such as Joseph Lyman Jessop, Joseph W. Musser, and Anne Wilde, in order to back up their opposition to arranged marriages in a fundamentalist Mormon context, particularly in response to the so-called placement marriages of the Fundamentalist Church of Jesus Christ of Latter-Day Saints.

=== Adam and Eve ===
It is said that Adam and Eve were the first of God's children to come to Earth. They were created in God's image, with bodies of flesh and bones. God placed them in the Garden of Eden. Here they did not remember their former existence, although they were still able to enjoy God's presence and could have lived forever.

As it is believed the God the Father has blessed all of His children with the ability to choose, Adam and Eve were given agency to make their own choices on the earth. God commanded them not to eat the forbidden fruit, or the fruit of the tree of knowledge of good and evil, warning that such would result in certain death. Obeying this commandment meant they could remain in the garden forever, but they could not progress by experiencing opposition in mortality and would remain innocent; they could not know joy because they could not experience sorrow and pain. Thus, as a part of the plan, Satan was allowed to tempt Adam and Eve to eat the forbidden fruit and they chose to do so. As a consequence, they were separated from God's presence physically and spiritually. Adam and Eve then became mortal; subject to sin and death, and were unable to return to Heavenly Father without his help. They could now experience disease and all types of suffering. They had moral agency, or the ability to choose between good and evil, which made it possible for them to learn and progress. It also made it possible for them to make wrong choices and to sin. In addition, they could now have children, so the rest of God's spirit children could come to Earth, obtain physical bodies, and be proven, which was in accordance with the plan of God. Only in this way could God's children progress and become like Him.

== See also ==
- Theodicy and the Bible § The Fall and freedom of the will
