= Exaltation (Mormonism) =

Reaching godhood in Latter-day Saint theology

Exaltation is a belief in Mormonism that after death some people will reach the highest level of salvation in the celestial kingdom and eternally live in God's presence, continue as families, become gods, create worlds, and make spirit children over whom they will govern. In the largest Mormon denomination, the Church of Jesus Christ of Latter-day Saints (LDS Church), top leaders have taught that God wants exaltation for all humankind and that humans are "gods in embryo". A verse in the LDS Church's canonized scripture states that those who are exalted will become gods, and a 1925 statement from the church's highest governing body said that "All men and women are in the similitude of the universal Father and Mother ... [and are] capable, by experience through ages and aeons, of evolving into a God."

The LDS Church and several other Mormon denominations teach that Mormons who sufficiently follow church teachings may become joint-heirs with Jesus Christ through exaltation. A popular quote from this church—often attributed to the early apostle Lorenzo Snow in 1837—is "As man now is, God once was: As God now is, man may be."

== LDS Church teachings ==
=== Required ordinances ===
According to Mormonism, certain ordinances are required of all those who hope to obtain exaltation. The ordinances that are required for exaltation are called "saving ordinances". The saving ordinances are

- Baptism;
- Confirmation;
- Melchizedek priesthood ordination (for men);
- Endowment, including washing and anointing;
- Celestial marriage.

The endowment and celestial marriage take place in temples. LDS Church members are taught that they can receive exaltation through performing saving ordinances. Performance of the saving ordinances does not guarantee exaltation. Rather, individuals must do their best to be faithful to the covenants that the ordinances represent.

For those who have lived and died without having received these ordinances, it is believed that exaltation will be available through LDS Church vicarious temple work. Latter-day Saints perform the saving ordinances on each other in temples on behalf of those who are dead. Latter-day Saints believe that all individuals will have an equitable and fair opportunity to hear the "fullness of the gospel" and that those who did not have an opportunity to accept the saving ordinances in this life will subsequently have the opportunity to accept them in the spirit world. Acceptance of the saving ordinances by those who have died is voluntary and does not take away the agency of those individuals. Should an individual who is in the spirit world subsequently reject saving ordinances performed for them, it would be as if these ordinances were never performed. It is taught that some will accept them, and others will reject them.

There is currently a less common temple ordinance which confers exaltation called the second anointing. It is the pinnacle ordinance of the temple and an extension of the Nauvoo endowment which founder Joseph Smith taught was to ensure salvation, guarantee exaltation, and confer godhood. In the ordinance, a participant is anointed as a "priest and king" or a "priestess and queen", and is sealed to the highest degree of salvation available in Mormon theology. The ordinance is currently only given in secret to a few select couples chosen by top leaders, and presently most LDS adherents are unaware of the ritual's existence.

==== Groups ineligible for exaltation ====
Not all LDS Church members were historically or are currently eligible for exaltation. Temple marriage is required for exaltation. All temple ordinances including temple sealings continue to be denied for non-heterosexual couples and transgender couples as of 2024, and heterosexuality and cisgenderism are requirements for godhood.

Between 1844 and 1978, church members of Black African descent were not permitted to participate in temple ordinances. Because these ordinances are considered essential to enter the highest degree of heaven, this meant black people were effectively banned from exaltation. This ban was lifted in 1978 by the canonized Official Declaration 2.

=== Nature of exaltation ===
The LDS Church teaches that those who receive exaltation will:

1. Live eternally in the presence of God the Father and Jesus Christ
2. Become gods
3. Be united eternally with their righteous family members and will be able to have eternal offspring
4. Receive a fulness of joy
5. Be given everything that God the Father and Jesus Christ have—all power, glory, dominion, and knowledge

The church teaches that after death exalted individuals will continue having marital sexual relations, and have spirit children over which they will govern as gods. Recent examples of this include a 2010 church manual which states that after death exalted adherents can "develop a kingdom over which [they] will preside as its king and god." This teaching is also echoed in a 2002 church manual which says exalted people "will [...] make new worlds for [their spirit children] to live on", and in a 2006 Ensign article which says if adherents are faithful and follow God's commandments they can receive, "a fulness and a continuation of the seeds forever, and perhaps through our faithfulness to have the opportunity of building worlds and peopling them."

A 2020 Sunday School manual says, "marital intimacy is glorious and will continue eternally for covenant-keeping husbands and wives." A 2013 student manual quotes a former church president who taught future exalted people can "organize matter into worlds on which their posterity may dwell, and over which they shall rule as gods."

==== Gendered inequality in exaltation ====
Women and men in the LDS Church are both eligible for exaltation, but some believe that the nature of that exaltation has "considerable uncertainty" for women, and sources point to women being "lesser deities subordinated to their husbands." Additionally, though both a husband and wife need each other for exaltation, some believe a husband helps the wife attain it in a way the wife doesn't for the husband. Current LDS policies would allow an exalted man to be sealed to unlimited wives, while an exalted woman can only be sealed to one husband.

=== Different kingdoms ===
Those who reject the ordinances are still believed to have the opportunity to inherit a kingdom of glory distinct from and of less glory than the celestial kingdom: the terrestrial kingdom or the telestial kingdom. Exaltation in the celestial kingdom is the ultimate goal of faithful LDS Church members.

== Other Mormon denominations ==
Another Mormon denominations, the Fundamentalist Church of Jesus Christ of Latter-Day Saints (FLDS Church), also teaches the doctrine of exaltation, but continue to teach that polygyny is required for exaltation. The LDS Church discontinued the polygyny requirement for exaltation. The Allred group or Apostolic United Brethren (AUB) and the LeBaron Church of the Firstborn also teach the doctrine of exaltation.

== See also ==
- Apotheosis
- Divinization (Christian)
- God in Mormonism
- King Follett discourse
- Mormon cosmology
- Mormonism and Nicene Christianity
- Plan of salvation
- Theosis (Orthodox theology)
