= Spirit body =

In LDS theology, man's spiritual element, made in the likeness of God

A spirit body is, according to the Church of Jesus Christ of Latter-day Saints (LDS Church), the organization of a spiritual element, made into the spiritual form of man, which was made in the same likeness (shape and form) of God the Father. This likeness (shape and form) apparently gave rise to the phrase and meaning of, "like father like son," which means the son is in the likeness of the father, which provides meaning to the claim that humanity was made in the likeness of God. Generally, people in the West have commonly used the word "soul" to denote this spirit body.

According to the LDS Church, when a spirit body enters a mortal body through birth, a temporary joining occurs, creating what is called a "soul." Church members believe that upon mortal death, the spirit body of a person leaves the mortal body and returns to the spiritual realm to await the resurrection.

The resurrection is where God raises the mortal body the spirit personage had lost in mortal death, and converts the mortal body from flesh, bone and blood, into immortal bodies of flesh and bone, then rejoins the two, never to be separated again. This is the meaning of the scripture "...It is sown in corruption; it is raised in incorruption:" (see "incorrupt") (1 Corinthians 15:42 - King James / see First Epistle to the Corinthians)

LDS Church members believe that all things created on earth, including humanity, had a pre-existence or pre-mortal origin. This belief of pre-mortal existence, the manner in which mankind existed before entering mortality is an important church doctrine, and is believed to support the existence of separate and distinct personages as seen within their doctrine of the Godhead (Mormonism).

Joseph Smith, founder of the Latter Day Saint movement, believed that "there is no such thing as immaterial matter. All spirit is matter, but it is more fine or pure, and can only be discerned by purer eyes; We cannot see it; but when our bodies are purified we shall see that it is all matter." This spirit matter always existed and is co-eternal with God. It is this spiritual matter that makes the Holy Ghost. This spiritual matter is also called "intelligence" or the "light of truth." God the Father organized the "intelligence" to make personages or "spirit children," which includes Jesus Christ. (This shows to support the general belief of Christians that all humanity are all brothers and sisters.)

== See also ==
- Plan of salvation (Latter Day Saints)
- Spirit world (Latter Day Saints)
