= King Follett discourse =

1844 sermon given by Joseph Smith

The King Follett discourse, or King Follett sermon, was an address delivered in Nauvoo, Illinois, by Joseph Smith, president and founder of the Latter Day Saint movement, on April 7, 1844, less than three months before he was killed by a mob. The discourse was presented to a congregation of about twenty thousand Latter Day Saints at a general conference held shortly after the funeral service of Elder King Follett, who had died on March 9, 1844, of injuries sustained in a well-digging accident. The sermon is notable for its assertion that God was once a mortal man, and that mortal men and women can become gods (a concept commonly called divinization) through salvation and exaltation. These topics were, and are, controversial, and have received varying opinions and interpretations of what Smith meant. Literary critic Harold Bloom called the sermon "one of the truly remarkable sermons ever preached in America."

== Text ==
A full, verbatim account of the speech does not exist, but notes exist, taken contemporaneously, by Thomas Bullock (using a type of personal shorthand), William Clayton (writing in longhand), and Willard Richards (taking "minute"-style notes of major elements of the speech). Wilford Woodruff also took extensive contemporaneous notes and transferred the notes to his journal with editorializations, but his original notes were not preserved. A brief additional account by Samuel W. Richards survives and is printed in Ehat and Cook's The Words of Joseph Smith. The Joseph Smith Papers project publishes the surviving accounts together. One author (Searle) estimates that the surviving notes of the sermon contain roughly 30% of the words of the actual address, but that together, they are likely nearly topically complete.

A version reconstructed (by Bullock) from the Bullock and Clayton records was published in the church paper Times and Seasons of August 15, 1844. A later version resulted from amalgamation of the Richards, Woodruff, Bullock and Clayton texts. This amalgamation was done by church employee, Jonathan Grimshaw, roughly ten years after Smith's death and is generally regarded as the official version of the Church of Jesus Christ of Latter-day Saints (LDS Church) because it was carefully reviewed, edited, and approved by church authorities, including Brigham Young. It contains some text not found in any of the primary sources and contains redundancies resulting from the naïve reconstruction. These redundancies, and the parts added by Grimshaw without support in the contemporaneous notes, were removed in a modern amalgamation by Stan Larson in 1978.

== Significance in Latter-day Saint theology ==
The sermon was not always viewed in a favorable light by leaders of the LDS Church or other denominations in the Latter Day Saint movement. It was not published in the LDS Church's 1912 History of the Church because of then-church president Joseph F. Smith's discomfort with some ideas in the sermon popularized by the editor of the project, B. H. Roberts of the First Council of the Seventy. By 1950, it was included in the revised edition of History of the Church. In 1971, the sermon was published in the Ensign, an official publication of the LDS Church.

The ideas of the King Follett sermon were a precursor to the Adam–God doctrine taught by Brigham Young, second president of the LDS Church. According to this doctrine, Adam was once a mortal man who became resurrected and exalted, followed by creating the Earth and again becoming a mortal being in the Garden of Eden before returning to heaven and to serving as the God of humankind. However, soon after Young died, the Adam–God doctrine fell out of favor within the LDS Church and was replaced by a more traditional biblical Adam and Eve theology. In 1976, church president Spencer W. Kimball stated the LDS Church does not support the Adam–God doctrine.

LDS Church president Lorenzo Snow succinctly summarized a portion of the doctrine explained in this discourse using a couplet, which is often repeated within the church:

As man now is, God once was:
As God now is, man may be.

The LDS Church today teaches that the King Follett discourse was "the most direct, public explanation" of unique doctrines, such as that of humanity's premortal existence and divine potential, that are alluded to in Latter Day Saint scripture. However, with respect to the nature of God prior to creation, the church has stated that "Little has been revealed ... and consequently little is taught."

=== Interpretation ===
The sermon's statement that God "was once as we are now" has generally been read as teaching that God the Father attained divinity at some first moment, having been exalted by a prior God — a reading reflected in the writings of Parley P. Pratt and John A. Widtsoe and, on Terryl Givens's account, dominant in subsequent Latter Day Saint thought. Taken together with the Sermon in the Grove, delivered that June, in which Smith spoke of a Father of Jesus Christ who himself had a Father, the sermons have been understood to imply a succession of deities without beginning.

The philosopher Blake Ostler has disputed this reading, arguing that the sermon teaches only that the Father, like the Son, underwent a mortal experience, and that he was fully divine both before and after it; Ostler points to Smith's statement that the Father had power in himself to lay down his life and take it up again, a power he takes to belong only to a divine person. Ostler has acknowledged that the succession reading is the one Latter-day Saints have commonly held.

Writing in Dialogue in 2022, Loren Pankratz examined Ostler's rereading at length and concluded that it is not borne out by the two sermons, arguing among other things that the Lectures on Faith depict Christ himself progressing to a fullness of glory, so that pressing the analogy between Father and Son does not yield the result Ostler seeks.

== Topics ==
Doctrinal topics in the sermon include:

- the fundamental nature of reality —

man is not a contingent being, moreover God made the world from preexisting "chaotic matter."
"I take my ring from my finger and liken it unto the mind of man ... because it has no beginning"
"The pure principles of element, are principles that can never be destroyed."

- the character and nature of God —

"It is the first principle of the Gospel to know for a certainty the Character of God, and to know that we may converse with him as one man converses with another."
"God himself was once as we are now, and is an exalted man, and sits enthroned in yonder heavens! That is the great secret. If the veil were rent today, and ... God ... (were) to make himself visible ... if you were to see him today, you would see him like a man in form — like yourselves in all the person, image, and the very form as a man."

- the plurality of the Gods and the opening of Genesis —

Smith argued that the initial bet of bereshit had been added by a later scribe, and that the remaining rosh should be read as "head," yielding: "The head one of the Gods brought forth the Gods." Kevin L. Barney has examined the emendation, concluding that Smith's precise reasoning is difficult to reconstruct but that he appears to have supposed the Hebrew text corrupted and his own reading original.

- Humanity’s potential to become Gods themselves. —

Smith discussed the potential of mankind by referencing Romans 8:17, then stating that men may go: "...from one small degree to another, and from a small capacity to a great one; from grace to grace, from exaltation to exaltation ... until (they) arrive at the station of a God."

- the tie between the living and their progenitors —

"Is there nothing to be done? — no preparation — no salvation for our fathers and friends who have died without having had the opportunity to obey the decrees of the Son of Man?"
"God hath made a provision that every spirit in the eternal world can be ... saved unless he has committed (the) unpardonable sin."

Regarding his personal religious experiences, Smith stated: "I don't blame anyone for not believing my history. If I had not experienced what I have, I could not have believed it myself." Concerned with difficulties facing the church and threats on his own life, he closed the two-hour-and-fifteen-minute address with a plea for peace and invoked God's blessing on the assembled Latter Day Saints.

Although the discourse is considered by Latter-day Saints to be one of the most important given by Smith on the nature of God and exaltation, it is not part of the LDS Church's canonized scriptures.

The topics in the discourse were not new to Smith's preaching. Nearly all the subjects treated were continuing threads from earlier sermons. However, this discourse brought these ideas together in one connected narrative, and has had much wider distribution than most of the rest of his public utterances.

== See also ==
- Divinization (Christian)
- God in Mormonism
- Exaltation (LDS Church)
