= Incarnation (Christianity) =

Belief that Jesus was made flesh by being conceived in the womb of a woman

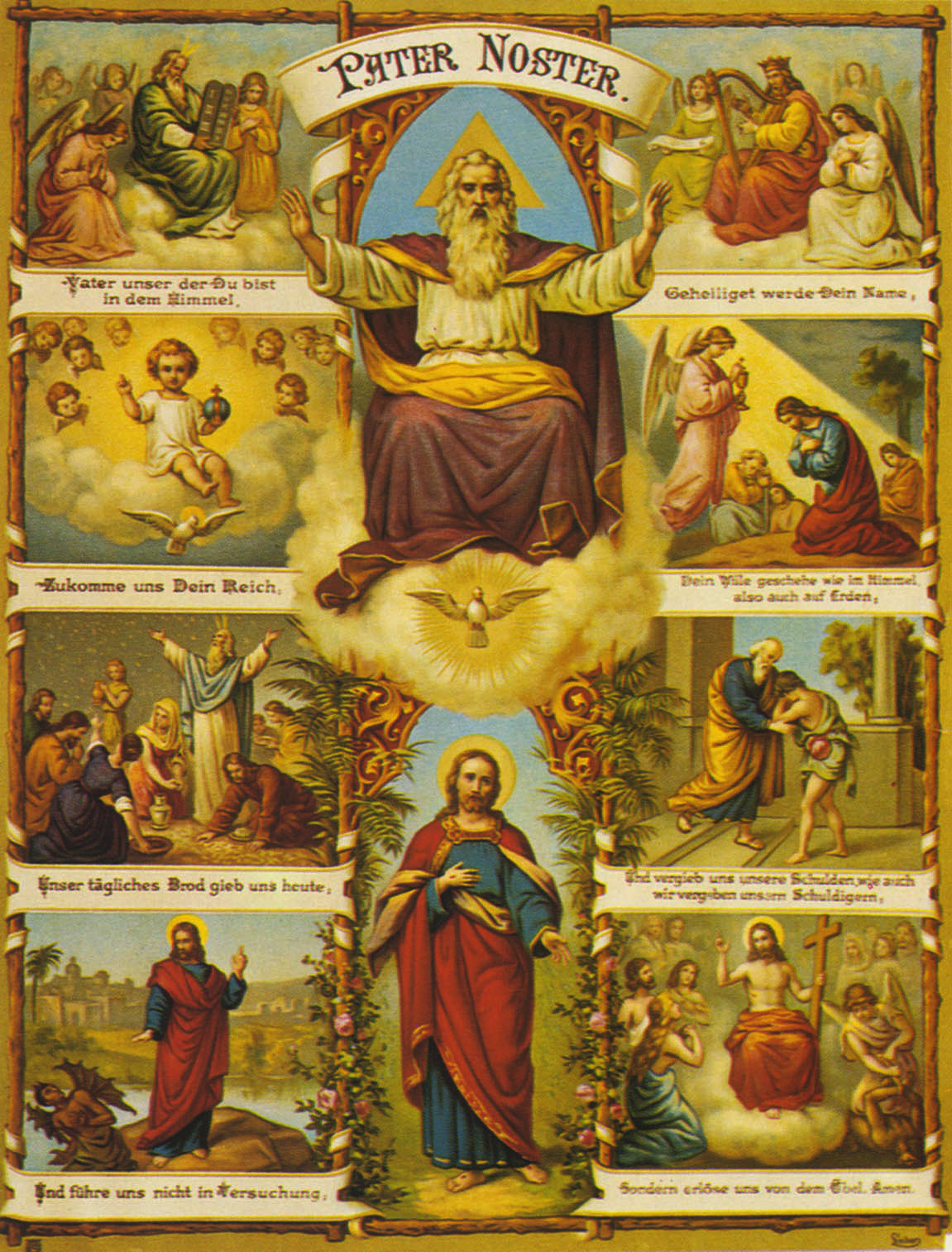
The incarnation illustrated with scenes from the Old Testament and the Gospels, with the Trinity in the central column, by Fridolin Leiber, 19th century

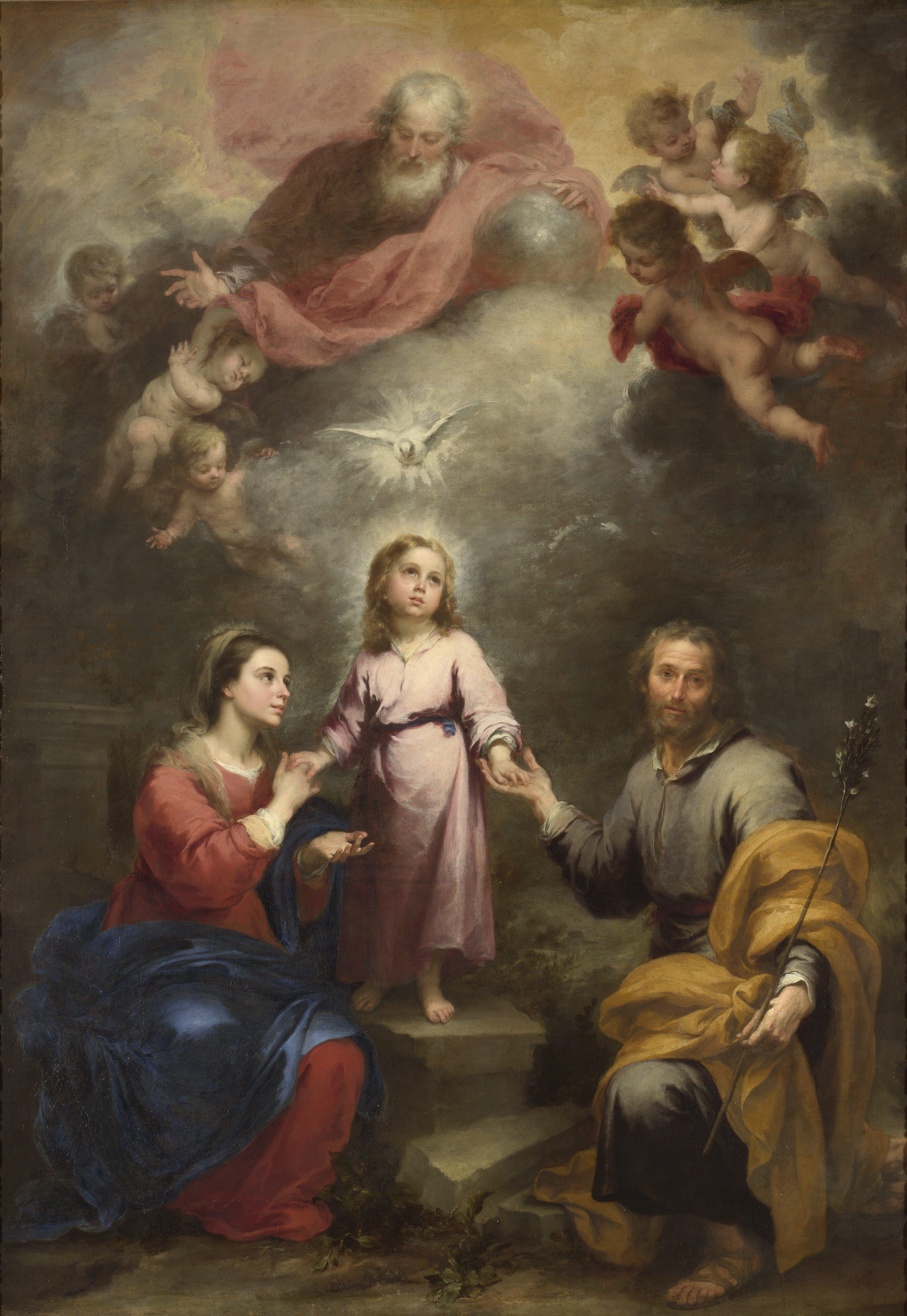
The "Heavenly Trinity" joined to the "Earthly Trinity" through the incarnation of the Son – The Heavenly and Earthly Trinities by Murillo (c. 1677)

In Christian theology, the incarnation is the belief that the pre-existent divine person of Jesus Christ, God the Son, the second person of the Trinity, who is also the Logos (Koine Greek for 'word'), was "made flesh" by being conceived through the power of the Holy Spirit in the womb of a woman, the Virgin Mary, who is also known as the Theotokos (Greek for "God-bearer" or "Mother of God"). The doctrine of the incarnation then entails that Jesus was at the same time both fully God and fully human.

In the incarnation, as traditionally defined by those Churches that adhere to the Council of Chalcedon, the divine nature of the Son was united but not mixed with human nature in one divine person, Jesus, or according to those adhering to the Council of Ephesus, the divine and human natures of Christ are fully united into one composite nature "without mixing, confusion, or separation". This is central to the traditional faith held by most Christians. Alternative views on the subject (see Ebionites and the Gospel of the Hebrews) have been proposed throughout the centuries, but all were rejected by Nicene Christianity.

The incarnation is commemorated and celebrated each year at Christmas, and reference can also be made to the Feast of the Annunciation; "different aspects of the mystery of the incarnation" are celebrated at Christmas and the Annunciation.

== Etymology ==
The noun incarnation derives from the ecclesiastical Latin verb incarno, itself derived from the prefix in- and caro, "flesh", meaning "to make into flesh" or, in the passive, "to be made flesh". The verb incarno does not occur in the Latin Bible but the term is drawn from the Gospel of John 1:14 "et Verbum caro factum est" (Vulgate), King James Version: "and the Word was made flesh".

== Description and development of the traditional doctrine ==
Incarnation refers to the act of a pre-existent divine person, the Son of God, in becoming a human being. While all Christians believed that Jesus was indeed the Son of God, "the divinity of Christ was a theologically charged topic for the Early Church." Debate on this subject occurred during the first four centuries of Christianity, involving Jewish Christians, Gnostics, followers of Arius of Alexandria, and adherents of Pope Alexander of Alexandria, among others.

Ignatius of Antioch taught that "We have also as a Physician the Lord our God, Jesus the Christ, the only-begotten Son and Word, before time began, but who afterwards became also man, of Mary the virgin." Justin Martyr argued that the incarnate Word was prefigured in Old Testament prophecies.

The Catechism of the Catholic Church discusses the Incarnation in paragraphs 461–463 and cites several Bible passages to assert its centrality (Philippians 2:5–8, Hebrews 10:5–7, 1 John 4:2, 1 Timothy 3:16).

=== Nicene Creed ===
The Nicene Creed is a statement of belief originating in two ecumenical councils, the First Council of Nicaea in 325, and the First Council of Constantinople in 381. As such, is it still relevant to most Christian churches today. The Incarnation is always professed, though different Rites use different translations. The Roman Catholic Church's current translation is: "For us men and for our salvation, he came down from heaven: by the power of the Holy Spirit, he was born of the Virgin Mary and became man."

=== Apostles' Creed ===
The Apostles' Creed includes the article of faith "He was conceived by the Holy Spirit and born of the Virgin Mary." According to Pope John Paul II, by his incarnation Jesus is a figure of and has united himself to every human being, including the unborn at the moment of their life at conception.

=== Ecumenical councils ===
Eventually, the teachings of Alexander, Athanasius, and the other Nicene Fathers that the Son was consubstantial and coeternal with the Father, were defined as orthodox dogma. All divergent beliefs were defined as heresies. This included Docetism, Arianism, Nestorianism, Monophysitism, Adoptionism, and Sabellianism.

The most widely accepted definitions of the Incarnation and the nature of Jesus Christ were established by the Council of Nicaea in 325. This council declared that Jesus is both fully God (begotten of the Father, but not created) and fully man, having taken his flesh and human nature from the Virgin Mary. At the Council of Chalcedon in 451, these two natures, human and divine, were defined as hypostatically united in the one personhood of Jesus Christ, (Note: The Seven Ecumenical Councils, from the Nicene and Post-Nicene Fathers, vols. 2–14 (CCEL.org) Contains detailed statements from each of these councils. The First Council of Nicaea, Council of Ephesus and Council of Chalcedon are the "First", "Third" and "Fourth" Ecumenical Councils, respectively.) while the Oriental Orthodox Churches, which rejected Chalcedon, affirm that the two natures are fully united into one composite nature that is both fully divine and fully human; in addition, the Church of the East, which rejected Ephesus, defines a prosopic union of the two natures as a mere "connexion" or "conjugation". In all cases, Jesus Christ is fully divine and fully human after the incarnation. According to the Catholic Church, an ecumenical council's declarations are infallible, making the incarnation a dogma in the Catholic Church.

=== Effect ===
The incarnation implies three facts: (1) The divine person of Jesus Christ; (2) The human nature of Jesus Christ; (3) The hypostatic union of the human with the divine nature in the divine person of Jesus Christ. Without diminishing his divinity, he added to it all that is involved in being human. In Christian belief it is understood that Jesus was at the same time both fully God and fully human, of two natures. The body of Christ was therefore subject to all the bodily weaknesses to which human nature is universally subject; such are hunger (Matthew.4:2), thirst (John 19:28), fatigue (John 4:6), pain, and death. They were the natural results of the human nature he assumed. Approaches such as Nestorianism, Ebonism, Arianism, Appoliniarianism, and Eutychianism have attempted understanding of the two natures of Christ; some of them have been condemned traditionally as heretical. In A Kryptic Model of the Incarnation, Andrew Loke evaluates many of these attempts and suggests a possible Divine Preconscious Model (DPM) that postulates that at the Incarnation, Christ's mind included the divine conscious and the divine preconscious along with a human preconscious.

The incarnation of Jesus is also one of the key factors which, alongside humans made in the image and likeness of God, forms Christian Anthropology. Specifically, incarnation is vital for understanding the concept of Divinisation of the Man, most well and elaborately developed in Orthodox Christianity and most well expressed by Church Fathers, such as St. Athanasius of Alexandria ("Therefore He was not man, and then became God, but He was God, and then became man, and that to deify us"), St Cyril of Alexandria ("For we too are sons and gods by grace, and we have surely been brought to this wonderful and supernatural dignity since we have the Only Begotten Word of God dwelling within us.") and numerous others.

=== Modern Protestantism ===
The link between the incarnation and the atonement within systematic theology is complex. Within traditional models of the atonement, such as Substitution, Satisfaction or Christus Victor, Christ must be human in order for the sacrifice of the cross to be efficacious, for human sins to be "removed" and/or "conquered". In his work The Trinity and the Kingdom of God, Jürgen Moltmann differentiated between what he called a "fortuitous" and a "necessary" incarnation. The latter gives a soteriological emphasis to the incarnation: the Son of God became a man so that he could save us from our sins. The former, on the other hand, speaks of the incarnation as a fulfilment of the love of God, of his desire to be present and living amidst humanity, to "walk in the garden" with us. Moltmann favours "fortuitous" incarnation primarily because he feels that to speak of an incarnation of "necessity" is to do an injustice to the life of Christ.

Philosopher Richard Swinburne has argued that the resurrection would serve as a confirming super-miracle if God became incarnate in Jesus for the purposes of atonement and revelation to humanity.

== Hymns and prayers ==
=== Eastern Orthodox and Byzantine Catholic ===
The significance of the incarnation has been extensively discussed throughout Christian history, and is the subject of countless hymns and prayers. For instance, the Divine Liturgy of St. John Chrysostom (c. 400), as used by Eastern Orthodox Christians and Byzantine Catholics, includes this "Hymn to the Only Begotten Son":

O only begotten Son and Word of God,
Who, being immortal,
Deigned for our salvation
To become incarnate
Of the holy Theotokos and ever-virgin Mary,
And became man without change;
You were also crucified,
O Christ our God,
And by death have trampled Death,
Being one of the Holy Trinity,
Glorified with the Father and the Holy Spirit—
Save us!

Additionally, the Divine Liturgy of Saint James includes this chant of "Let All Mortal Flesh Keep Silence" in its offertory:

Let all mortal flesh be silent,
and stand with fear and trembling,
and meditate nothing earthly within itself:—
For the King of kings and Lord of lords,
Christ our God, comes forward to be sacrificed,
and to be given for food to the faithful;
and the bands of angels go before Him
with every power and dominion,
the many-eyed cherubim,
and the six-winged seraphim,
covering their faces,
and crying aloud the hymn,
Alleluia, Alleluia, Alleluia.

=== West Syriac Churches ===
The West Syriac Churches – Syriac Orthodox, Malankara Orthodox, Syro-Malankara Catholic, Syriac Catholic and Maronite Catholic – principally celebrating the Holy Qurbono of St. James (c. AD 60) have a similar ma‛neetho, (Note: (Syr.): A responsory, originally to a psalm, where each verse of a psalm had a response in poetic form. The text of this ma‛neetho dates back to the 6th century and is attributed in later sources to St. Severus, the Patriarch of Antioch (c. 465–538). The Byzantine Orthodox rite also has a similar hymn called a troparion and is attributed there to Emperor Justinian (c. 483–565)) a poetic hymn, traditionally attributed to St. Severus, the Patriarch of Antioch (c. 465–538):

I exalt Thee, Lord and King,
Only-begotten Son and Word
of the heavenly Father,
immortal by nature, Thou came down by grace
for salvation
and life for all human race; was incarnate
of the holy
glorious, pure Virgin
Mary, Mother of God
and became man without any change;
was crucified for us.
O Christ, our God,
Who by Thy death trampled and slaughtered our death,
Who are One of the Holy Trinity,
worshipped and honored with
the Father and the Holy Spirit,
have mercy on us all.

== Alternative views ==
=== Michael Servetus ===
During the Reformation, Michael Servetus taught a theology of the incarnation that denied trinitarianism, insisting that classical trinitarians were essentially tritheists who had rejected Biblical monotheism in favor of Greek philosophy. The Son of God, Servetus asserted, is not an eternally existing being, but rather the more abstract Logos (a manifestation of the One True God, not a separate person) incarnate. For this reason, Servetus refused to call Christ the "eternal Son of God" preferring "the Son of the eternal God" instead.

In describing Servetus' theology of the Logos, Andrew Dibb (2005) comments: "In Genesis God reveals Himself as the Creator. In John He reveals that He created by means of the Word, or Logos. Finally, also in John, He shows that this Logos became flesh and 'dwelt among us'. Creation took place by the spoken word, for God said 'Let there be...' The spoken word of Genesis, the Logos of John, and the Christ, are all one and the same."

Condemned by both the Roman Catholic and Protestant churches on account of his heterodox Christology, Servetus was burnt at the stake for heresy in 1553, by the Reformed Protestants in Geneva, Switzerland. The French reformer John Calvin, who asserted he would ensure the death of Servetus if he set foot in Geneva because of his non-Reformed views on the Trinity and the sacrament of baptism, requested he be beheaded as a traitor rather than burned as a heretic, but the authorities insisted on executing Servetus by fire.

=== English Arians ===
Post-Reformation Arians such as William Whiston often held a view of the incarnation in keeping with the personal pre-existence of Christ. Whiston considered the incarnation to be of the Logos Who had pre-existed as "a Metaphysick existence, in potentia or in the like higher and sublimer Manner in the Father as His Wisdom or Word before His real Creation or Generation."

=== Jacob Bauthumley ===
Jacob Bauthumley rejected that God was "onely manifest in the flesh of Christ, or the man called Christ". Instead, he held that God "substantially dwells in the flesh of other men and creatures" rather than solely Christ.

=== Socinian and Unitarian ===
Servetus rejected Arianism because it denied Jesus' divinity so it is certain that he would have also rejected Socinianism as a form of Arianism which both rejects that Jesus is God, and, also that Jesus consciously existed before his birth, which most Arian groups accept. Fausto Sozzini and writers of the Polish Brethren such as Samuel Przypkowski, Marcin Czechowic and Johann Ludwig von Wolzogen saw the incarnation as being primarily a function of fatherhood. Namely that Christ was literally both 'Son of Man' from his maternal side, and also literally 'Son of God' on his paternal side. The concept of the incarnation —"the Word became flesh and dwelt among us"— was understood as the literal word or logos of Ps. 33:6 having been made human by a virgin birth. Sozzini, Przypkowski and other Socinian writers were distinct from Servetus in stating that Jesus having "come down from heaven" was primarily in terms of Mary's miraculous conception and not in Jesus having in any literal sense been in heaven. Today the number of churches with Socinian Christology is very small, the main group known for this are the Christadelphians, other groups include CoGGC and CGAF. Modern Socinian or "Biblical Unitarian" writers generally place emphasis on "made flesh" not just meaning "made a body", but incarnation (a term these groups would avoid) requiring Jesus having the temptable and mortal nature of His mother.

=== Oneness Pentecostalism ===
In contrast to the traditional view of the incarnation cited above, adherents of Oneness Pentecostalism believe in the doctrine of Oneness. Although both Oneness and traditional Christianity teach that God is a singular Spirit, Oneness adherents reject the idea that God is a Trinity of persons. Oneness doctrine teaches there is one God who manifests Himself in different ways, as opposed to a Trinity, where God is seen as one being consisting of three distinct persons.

To a Oneness Pentecostal, Jesus is seen as both fully divine and fully human. The term Father refers to God Himself, who caused the conception of the Son in Mary, thus becoming the father of the child she bore. The term Son refers to the fully human person, Jesus Christ; and the Holy Ghost refers to the manifestation of God's Spirit inside of and around His people. Thus the Father is not the Son – and this distinction is crucial – but is in the Son as the fullness of His divine nature. Traditional Trinitarians believe that the Son always existed as the eternal second person of the Trinity; Oneness adherents believe that the Son did not come into being until the incarnation, when the one and only true God took on human form for the first, last and only time in history.

=== Jehovah's Witnesses ===
The Jehovah's Witnesses believe Jesus to be the only direct creation of God through whom God created everything else. His incarnation is considered to be temporary, after which Christ, accordingly, resumed his spiritual and angelic form. Christ is not seen as divine or co-equal with God the Father. After resurrection, Jesus is seen as assuming temporary human forms, though resuming his spirit form eventually.

=== The Church of Jesus Christ of Latter-day Saints (Mormonism) ===
According to Latter-day Saint theology, two of the three divine beings of the Godhead have perfected, glorified, physical bodies, namely God the Father (Elohim) and God the Son (Jehovah). Instead of considering the Father, the Son, and the Holy Ghost as one in substance or essence with one another, Latter-day Saints understand the oneness of the Godhead as symbolic of Their perfectly united characteristics and purpose, while yet acknowledging that they are three separate and distinct beings. To explain this divergence from Trinitarian oneness as literal rather than symbolic, Latter-day Saints commonly cite Christ's Intercessory Prayer in John 17:20-23, which reads:

- "I do not ask for these [disciples] only, but also for those who will believe in me through their word, that they may all be one, just as you, Father, are in me, and I in you, that they also may be in us, so that the world may believe that you have sent me. The glory that you have given me I have given to them, that they may be one even as we are one, I in them and you in me, that they may become perfectly one, so that the world may know that you sent me and loved them even as you loved me."

This conception of the Godhead differs from the Trinitarian view of the Incarnation in which only God the Son, temporarily possessed an incarnated, physical body while God the Father is and has always remained unembodied. Despite these differences, Latter-day Saint doctrine accepts a similar version of so-called ethical monotheism (which developed out of the Jewish tradition), in that Latter-day Saints believe that the Light of Christ (alternatively referred to as the Spirit of Christ) emanates from God the Son throughout the world, thereby influencing all people everywhere to do good and eschew evil. This teaching is best exemplified in the Book of Mormon in Moroni 7:13-19, which states:

- "Wherefore, all things which are good cometh of God; and that which is evil cometh of the devil; for the devil is an enemy unto God, and fighteth against him continually, and inviteth and enticeth to sin, and to do that which is evil continually. But behold, that which is of God inviteth and enticeth to do good continually; wherefore, every thing which inviteth and enticeth to do good, and to love God, and to serve him, is inspired of God...For behold, the Spirit of Christ is given to every man, that he may know good from evil; wherefore, I show unto you the way to judge; for every thing which inviteth to do good, and to persuade to believe in Christ, is sent forth by the power and gift of Christ; wherefore ye may know with a perfect knowledge it is of God. But whatsoever thing persuadeth men to do evil, and believe not in Christ, and deny him, and serve not God, then ye may know with a perfect knowledge it is of the devil...Wherefore, I beseech of you, brethren, that ye should search diligently in the light of Christ that ye may know good from evil; and if ye will lay hold upon every good thing, and condemn it not, ye certainly will be a child of Christ."
