= Moultrie (name) =

Moultrie is both a Scottish surname and a given name. Notable people with the name include:

== Surname ==
- Dan Moultrie (born 1957), American Businessman, Inventor, and Conservationist
- Arnett Moultrie (born 1990), American basketball player
- Gerard Moultrie (1829–1885), English public schoolmaster and Anglican hymnographer
- Halson Moultrie (born 1952), Bahamian politician
- John Moultrie (politician) (1729–1798), American politician
- John Moultrie (poet) (1799–1874), English clergyman, poet, and hymn writer
- Khalid Moultrie (born 1995), American actor
- Olivia Moultrie (born 2005), American soccer player
- William Moultrie (1730–1805), American Revolutionary War general
- The Moultrays of Seafield in Fife, a Scottish aristocratic family

== Given name ==
- Moultrie Kelsall (1901–1980), Scottish actor
- Moultrie Patten (1919–2009), American actor and jazz musician
