= God in Mormonism =

Mormon conception of God

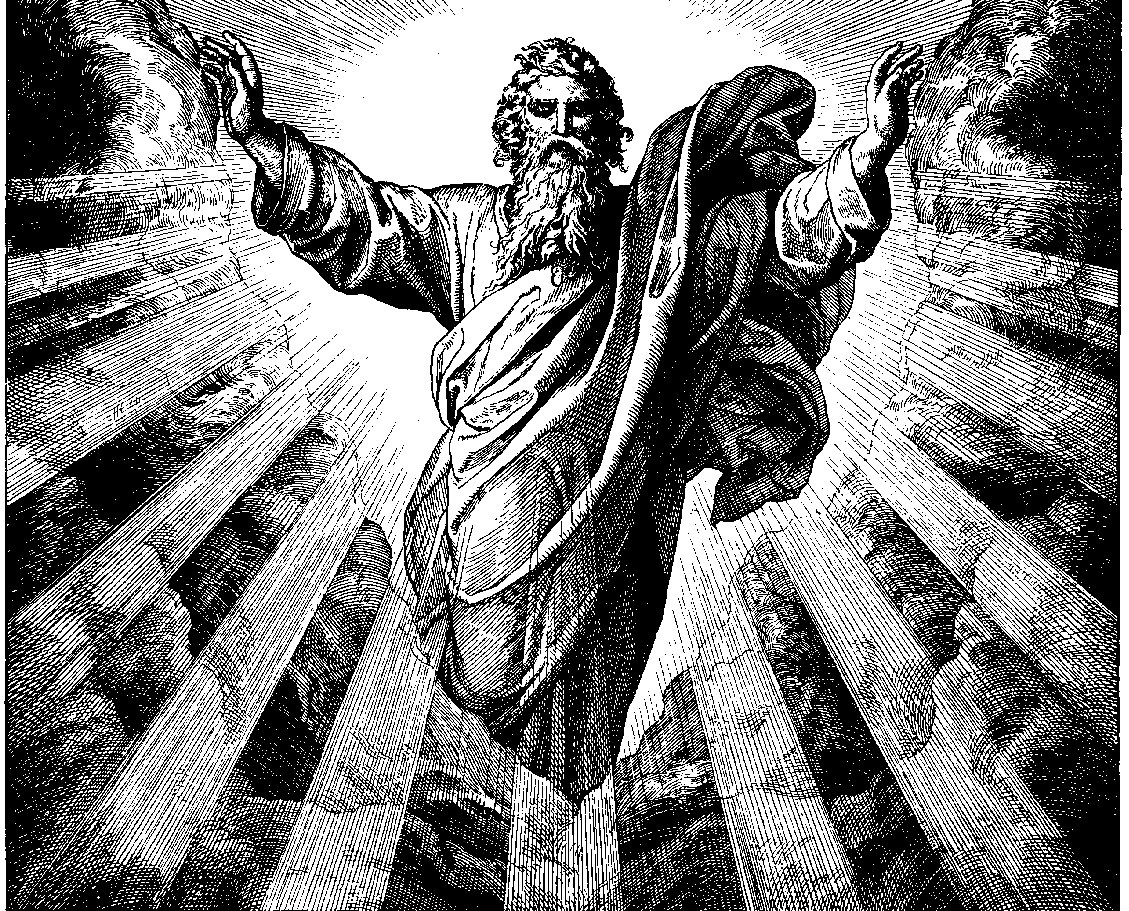
An image of God the Father by Julius Schnorr, 1860

In orthodox Mormonism, the term God generally refers to the biblical God the Father, whom Latter Day Saints also refer to as Elohim or 'Heavenly Father', while the term 'Godhead' refers to a council of three distinct divine persons consisting of God the Father, Jesus (his firstborn Son, whom Latter-day Saints refer to as Jehovah), and the Holy Ghost. However, in Latter Day Saint theology the term "God" may also refer to, in some contexts, the Godhead as a whole or to each member individually.

Latter-day Saints believe that the Father, Son, and Holy Ghost are three distinct beings, that the Father and Jesus have perfected, glorified, physical bodies, and that the Holy Ghost is a spirit without a physical body. Latter-day Saints also believe that there are other gods and goddesses outside the Godhead, such as a Heavenly Mother—who is married to God the Father—and that faithful Latter-day Saints may attain godhood in the afterlife. The term Heavenly Parents is used to refer collectively to the divine partnership of Heavenly Father and a Heavenly Mother. Joseph Smith taught that God was once a man on another planet before being exalted to Godhood.

This conception differs from the traditional Christian Trinity in several ways, one of which is that Mormonism has not adopted or continued to hold the doctrine of the Nicene Creed, that the Father, Son, and Holy Ghost are of the same substance or being. Also, Mormonism teaches that the intelligence dwelling in each human is coeternal with God. Mormons use the term omnipotent to describe God and regard him as the creator: they understand him as being almighty and eternal but subject to eternal natural law which governs intelligence, justice and the eternal nature of matter (i.e., God organized the world but did not create it from nothing). The Mormon conception of God also differs substantially from the Jewish tradition of ethical monotheism, in which Elohim (Hebrew: אֱלֹהִים) is a completely different conception.

This description of God represents the Mormon orthodoxy, formalized in 1915 based on earlier teachings. Other extant and historical branches of Mormonism have or had adopted different views of God, such as the Adam–God doctrine and trinitarianism.

== Early Latter Day Saint concepts ==
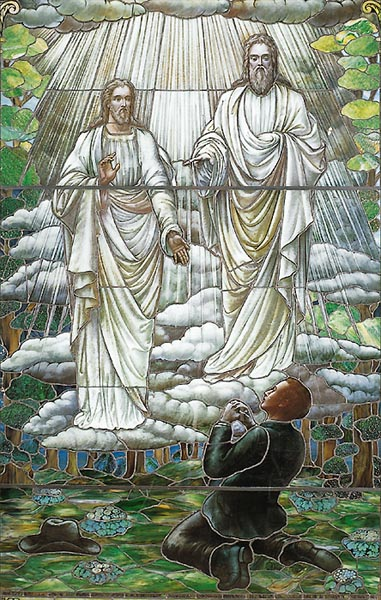
In his 1838 personal history, Joseph Smith wrote that he had seen two personages in the spring of 1820. In 1843, Smith stated that these personages, God the Father and Jesus, had separate, corporal bodies.

Most early Latter Day Saints came from a Protestant background, believing in the doctrine of the Trinity that had developed during the early centuries of Christianity. Before roughly 1835, Mormon theological teachings were similar to those of mainstream Protestantism. Founder Joseph Smith's teachings regarding the nature of the Godhead changed during his lifetime, becoming fully developed in the few years prior to his murder in 1844. Beginning as an unelaborated description of the Father, Son, and Holy Spirit as being "One", Smith taught that the Father and the Son were distinct personal members of the Godhead as early as 1832. Smith's public teachings described the Father and Son as possessing distinct physical bodies, being one together with the Holy Ghost, not in material substance, but in spirit, glory, and purpose. Latter-day Saint scholar David L. Paulsen refers to this oneness as constituting "one perfectly united, and mutually indwelling, divine community". Together with other Mormon and non-Mormon scholars, such as Richard Bushman, Craig Blomberg, and Stephen H. Webb, they have described said oneness of the Godhead as social trinitarianism; Mormon critic Robert M. Bowman Jr. prefers tritheism or "ethical polytheism".

Mormons view their concept of the Godhead as a restoration of original Christian doctrine as taught by Jesus and the apostles in the New Testament. Mormons see the strong influence of Greek culture and philosophy (Hellenization) during this period as contributing to a departure from the traditional Christian view of a corporeal God in whose image and likeness humanity was created. These theologians began to define God in terms of three persons, or hypostases, sharing one immaterial divine substance, or ousia—a concept that some claim found no backing in scripture, (Note: The wording of the Council of Constantinople (360) prohibited use of the terms substance, essence, and ousia because they were not included in the scriptures.) but closely mirrored elements of Greek philosophy such as Neoplatonism.

=== Teachings during Joseph Smith's lifetime ===
The Book of Mormon teaches that God the Father, Jesus, and the Holy Ghost are "one", with Jesus appearing with a body of spirit before his birth and a tangible body after his resurrection. The book describes the "Spirit of the Lord" "in the form of a man", speaking as a man would.

Before the birth of Jesus, the book depicts him as a spirit "without flesh and blood", with a spirit "body" that looked the same as he would appear during his physical life. Moreover, Jesus described himself as follows: "Behold, I am he who was prepared from the foundation of the world to redeem my people. Behold, I am Jesus Christ. I am the Father and the Son. In me shall all mankind have life, and that eternally, even they who shall believe on my name; and they shall become my sons and my daughters." In another passage of the Book of Mormon, the prophet Abinadi states,

I would that ye should understand that God himself shall come down among the children of men, and shall redeem his people. And because he dwelleth in flesh he shall be called the Son of God, and having subjected the flesh to the will of the Father, being the Father and the Son—the Father, because he was conceived by the power of God; and the Son, because of the flesh; thus becoming the Father and Son—and they are one God, yea, the very Eternal Father of heaven and of earth.

After Jesus was resurrected and ascended into Heaven, the Book of Mormon states that he visited a group of people in the Americas, who saw that he had a resurrected, tangible body. During his visit, God the Father announced him, and those present felt the Holy Spirit, but only the Jesus was seen. Jesus is quoted as saying,

Father, thou hast given them the Holy Ghost because they believe in me; and thou seest that they believe in me because thou hearest them, and they pray unto me; and they pray unto me because I am with them. And now Father, I pray unto thee for them, and also for all those who shall believe on their words, that they may believe in me, that I may be in them as thou, Father, art in me, that we may be one.

The Book of Mormon states that Jesus, the Father, and the Holy Spirit are "one". Some scholars have suggested that the view of Jesus in the Book of Mormon is also consistent, or perhaps most consistent, with monotheistic modalism.

Even so, some historians have debated about Smith's early conception of God. According to Boyd Kirkland and Thomas Alexander, in the early-to-mid-1830s Smith viewed God the Father as a spirit. However, Terryl Givens and Brian M. Hauglid argue that although Smith sometimes spoke of God using trinitarian language, revelations he dictated as early as 1830 described God as an embodied being. Catholic philosopher Stephen H. Webb describes Smith having had a "corporeal and anthropomorphic understanding of God" evinced in his 1830 Book of Moses that described God as a physical being who literally resembles human beings. Steven C. Harper states that because, in the 1830s, Smith privately described to some of his followers his 1820 first vision as a theophany of "two divine, corporeal beings", "its implications for the trinity and materiality of God were asserted that early".

In public sermons later in Smith's life, he described what he thought was the true nature of the Godhead in much greater detail. In 1843, Smith described both God the Father and God the Son as having distinct physical bodies and the Holy Spirit being a distinct yet incorporeal being, as well: "The Father has a body of flesh and bones as tangible as man's; the Son also; but the Holy Ghost has not a body of flesh and bones, but is a personage of Spirit. Were it not so, the Holy Ghost could not dwell in us." Although the verse is included in canonized LDS scripture, some dispute its authenticity—particularly that of the Holy Ghost dwelling in humans since the teaching was inconsistent with the manuscript source's wording about the Holy Ghost and underwent various revisions and modifications before finalization.

During this period, Smith also introduced a theology that could support the existence of a Heavenly Mother. The primary source for this theology is the sermon he delivered at the funeral of King Follett (commonly called the King Follett Discourse). The LDS Church believes that a Heavenly Mother exists, but very little is acknowledged or known beyond her existence or the number of Heavenly Mothers as early LDS leaders did teach that it was "clearly shown that God the Father had a plurality of wives".

=== Later teachings ===
Lorenzo Snow succinctly summarized another portion of the doctrine explained in the King Follett Discourse using a couplet: "As man now is, God once was; as God now is, man may be."

== Denominational teachings ==
=== LDS Church ===
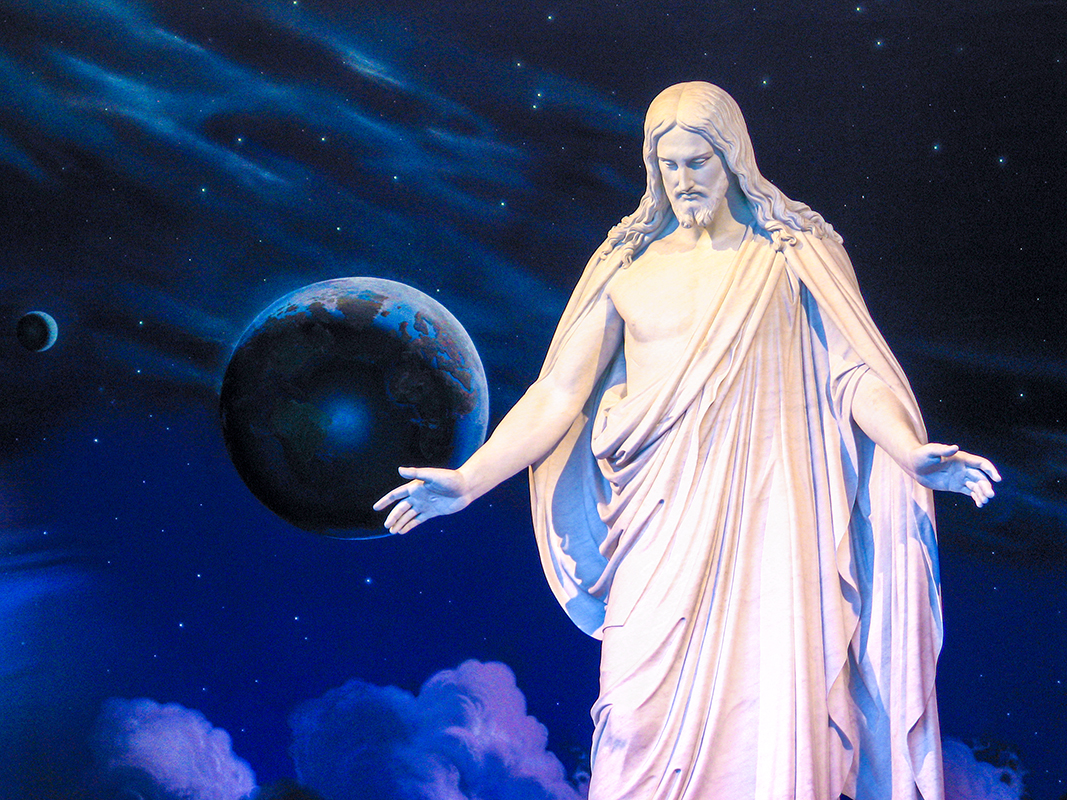
Latter-day Saints believe in the resurrected Jesus Christ, as depicted in the Christus statue in the North Visitors' Center on Temple Square in Salt Lake City.

The LDS Church holds that the Father and the Son have glorified physical bodies, while the Holy Ghost has only a body of spirit.

Leaders and scriptural texts of the LDS Church affirm a belief in the Holy Trinity but use the word "Godhead" (a term used by Paul the Apostle in Acts 17:29, Romans 1:20, and Colossians 2:9) to distinguish their belief that the unity of the Trinity relates to all attributes, except a physical unity of beings. Church members believe that "The Father has a body of flesh and bones as tangible as man's; the Son also; but the Holy Ghost has not a body of flesh and bones, but is a personage of Spirit."

This theology is consistent with Smith's 1838 account of the First Vision. This account, published as part of the church's Pearl of Great Price states that Smith saw a vision of "two personages", the Father and the Son. Mormon critics view this 1838 account with skepticism, because Smith's earliest accounts of the First Vision did not refer to the presence of two beings. The church also teaches that its theology is consistent with the biblical account of the baptism of Jesus, which referred to signs from the Father and the Holy Spirit and which the denomination interprets as an indication that these two persons have distinct substance from Jesus.

Smith taught that there is one Godhead and that humans can have a place, as joint-heirs with Jesus, through grace, if they follow the laws and ordinances of the gospel as he taught it. This process of exaltation means literally that humans can become full, complete, joint-heirs with Jesus and can, if proven worthy, inherit all that he inherits. Leaders have taught that God is infinitely loving, though his love "cannot correctly be characterized as unconditional." Though humanity has the ability to become gods through the atonement of Jesus, these exalted beings will remain eternally subject to God the Father and "will always worship" him. Among the resurrected, the righteous souls receive great glory and return to live with God, being made perfect through the atonement of Jesus. Thus, "god" is a term for an inheritor of the highest kingdom of God.

=== Community of Christ ===
The Community of Christ, formerly the Reorganized Church of Jesus Christ of Latter-day Saints, affirms the doctrine of the Trinity. The Trinity is described in Community of Christ literature as a "living God who meets us in the testimony of Israel, is revealed in Jesus Christ, and moves through all creation as the Holy Spirit...[a] community of three persons."

== Plurality of gods ==
Latter Day Saints believe God's children have the potential to live in his presence, continue as families, become gods, create worlds, and have spirit children over which they will govern. This is commonly called exaltation within the LDS Church. Leaders have also taught that humans are "gods in embryo". Although Mormonism proclaims the existence of many gods, it does not advocate for the worship of any besides Earth's God. Some leaders have taught that God was once a mortal human with his own God. Church founder Joseph Smith taught in his famous King Follett discourse that God was the son of a Father, suggesting a cycle of gods that continues for eternity. Other more modern leaders and church publications have taught similar things.

Several scholars have argued the LDS Church can be described as henotheist, in worshiping only one deity while admitting the existence of other deities. However, this position is somewhat controversial and not entirely accepted by scholars or members of the LDS faith.

== See also ==
- Adamic cycle
- Alpha and Omega
- Kolob
- God in Abrahamic religions
- Godhead in Christianity
- Holy Ghost in Mormonism
- Non-Chalcedonianism
- Monolatrism
- Mormonism and Judaism
- Mormonism and Islam
- Twin Manifestations of God
