= John Moultrie =

John Moultrie may refer to:

- John Moultrie (poet) (1799–1874), English clergyman, poet and hymn-writer
- John Moultrie, Jr. (1729–1798), deputy governor of East Florida
