= Valerie M. Hudson =

American professor of political science

- Born: 1958 (age 67–68); Washington, D.C.
- Education: Brigham Young University (BA); Ohio State University (MA, PhD)
- Spouse: David Cassler
- Children: 8

Valerie M. Hudson (born 1958) is an American professor of political science in the Department of International Affairs at The Bush School of Government and Public Service at Texas A&M University as of January 2012. Prior to coming to Texas A&M, Hudson was a professor of political science at Brigham Young University for over 24 years. She is most noted for having co-authored the book Bare Branches which discussed the effects of China's demographic decisions on sex ratios in China and other countries.

== Writings ==
Hudson has written or edited several books, including Foreign Policy Analysis: Classical and Contemporary Theory (Boulder, Colorado: Rowman and Littlefield, 2007, 2013, 2019), Culture and Foreign Policy, Artificial Intelligence and International Politics as well as Bare Branches: Security Implications of Asia's Surplus Male Populations (MIT Press, 2004). The last was with Andrea Den Boer. In April 2012 Columbia University Press published a book co-authored by Hudson entitled Sex and World Peace. Recent co-authored books also include (with Patricia Leidl) The Hillary Doctrine: Sex and American Foreign Policy (Columbia University Press, 2015). In 2020 Columbia University Press published a book co-authored by Hudson entitled The First Political Order: How Sex Shapes Governance and National Security Worldwide. Along with Donna Lee Bowen, and Perpetua Lynne Nielsen. According to the author herself, this book is the culmination of decades of research on gender studies, inequality and world peace. The first political order in any society is the sexual political order established between men and women, said Hudson. Whether society considers the two groups equal, whether it resolves conflicts between the groups peacefully or by force, and whether resources are equally distributed between them have far-reaching consequences for peace and security. “And we argue, along with many, many other scholars, that the character of that first order molds the society, its governance, and its behavior,” said Hudson.

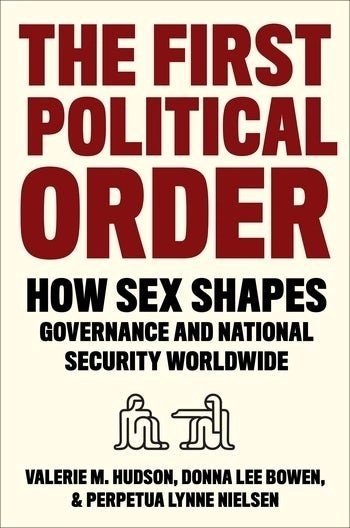

Hudson has edited multiple books with Kerry M. Kartchner on Latter-day Saints and their relationships with United States foreign and security policies. Hudson wrote a long article with Sorensen on Latter-day Saint views of Womanist theology published in David L. Paulsen's and Donald W. Musser's Mormonism in Dialogue with Contemporary Christianity (Macon, Georgia: Mercer University Press, 2007). She contributed a collaborative article with Alan J. Hawkins, Camille Fronk Olson, Lynn D. Wardle, Richard D. Draper, Diane L. Spangler and a few others, an article about mothers and fathers being equal partners in David C. Dollahite's Strengthening Our Families: An In-depth Look At The Proclamation on The Family. With A. Don Sorensen and Allen Bergin Hudson wrote an article entitled "Benevolent Power and Unrighteous Dominion" that was published in Bergin's Eternal Values and Personal Growth: LDS and Social Sciences Perspectives (Provo: BYU Press, 2002). She has also written Women in Eternity, Women of Zion with A. Don Sorensen (Springville: Cedar Fort, 2004).

Hudson has published articles in such journals as International Security and Political Psychology including article co-authored with others such as Bonnie Ballif-Spanvill about the relationship between the security of women and the security of states. She also contributed a chapter to Foreign Policy Decision Making (Revisited). Additionally, she and fellow researcher Hillary Matfess uncovered linkages between violent conflict and bride price.

== Recent work ==
Hudson is a self-described feminist. She has been influenced by the writings of Alma Don Sorensen on equality and Sylviane Agacinski on parity between men and women. Hudson is one of the creators of the WomenStat DataBase, a project that began in 2001 with the aim of investigating the link between the security and behavior of states and the situation and security of the women within them.
