= Alan Hawkins =

Alan Hawkins may refer to:

- Alan J. Hawkins (academic) (born 1955), American academic and professor at Brigham Young University
- Alan J. Hawkins (bishop) (born 1970), American Anglican bishop
