= David Paulsen =

David Paulsen may refer to:

- David Paulsen (producer) (born 1946), American screenwriter, director, and producer
- David L. Paulsen (1936–2020), American philosopher
- Dave Paulsen (born 1964), American basketball coach

== See also ==
- David Paulson, American football player
- David E. Paulson, Wisconsin politician
