= Stephen H. Webb =

American theologian (1961–2016)

Stephen H. Webb (March 13, 1961 – March 5, 2016) was a theologian and philosopher of religion.

Webb graduated from Wabash College in 1983, earned his Ph.D. at the University of Chicago, and taught at Wabash College as Professor of Religion and Philosophy from 1988 to 2012. (He was on leave from Wabash College during 2012–13, and retired early to pursue writing opportunities full-time.) Born in 1961 and reared in Indianapolis, Indiana, he grew up at Englewood Christian Church, an evangelical church in the Restoration Movement. He recounts his experiences there in Taking Religion to School (Brazos Press, 2000) and in an essay, "Recalling: A Theologian Remembers His Church," in Falling Toward Grace: Images of Religion and Culture from the Heartland, ed. Kent Calder and Susan Neville (Indiana University Press, 1998). He joined the Disciples of Christ during graduate school but soon became disenchanted with their theological direction. He was briefly a Lutheran, and on Easter Sunday, 2007, he officially became a member of the Catholic Church, in which he remained for the rest of his life.

== Views on vegetarianism and animal rights ==
He was known for his scholarship and journalism on animals, vegetarianism, and diet. He co-founded the Christian Vegetarian Association, but was removed from his position as co-chairman in 2006 after writing several articles in which he admitted to eating meat occasionally, while promoting vegetarianism. He defended the value of animals by reaffirming traditional notions of human uniqueness and human responsibility for nature. Many animal rights arguments are influenced by a leveling of the differences between humans and animals as well as a leveling of the differences between God and the world. This vision of a non-dogmatic and non-legalistic vegetarianism linked to traditional biblical principles rather than the pantheism of the New Age movement or the abdication of human uniqueness entailed in animal rights legislation has been controversial in both theological and philosophical circles. For an example of his work, see his essays, "Theology from the Pet Side Up: A Christian Agenda for NOT Saving the World" and "Against the Gourmands: In Praise of Fast Food as a Form of Fasting," both published in the online journal The Other Journal.

Webb's critique of what he calls the "animal eliminationist" wing of the animal rights movement was presented at the 2008 American Academy of Religion conference in Chicago.

Several books have extensively analyzed and criticized his position, including Laura Hobgood-Oster, Holy Dogs and Asses (University of Illinois Press, 2008) and Stephen M. Vantassel, Dominion over Wildlife? (Resource Publications, 2009). The Encyclopedia of Christianity, ed. John Bowden (Oxford University Press, 2005) lists him as one of the leaders of the animal theology movement (p. 52).

== Political views ==
Later in his career, Webb turned his attention to politics, culture, popular culture, and liberal advocacy. Within this field, Webb generated positive and negative reviews with his book American Providence (Continuum, 2004) in which he defended the idea that the doctrine of providence has been a crucial ingredient in American history and American identity. Providential interpretations of American national aspirations went into decline after the Vietnam War, but with President Bush's openness regarding the role of faith in his presidency, providence has returned to the public square. Webb argued that even anti-Americanism is dependent upon providential logic, because conspiracy theories about how evil America is grant America a special role in world history. He also argued that the future belongs to the triad of capitalism, democracy, and various forms of evangelical Christianity, not limited to explicitly evangelical churches. One of his controversial essays on politics is “On the True Globalism and the False, or Why Christians Should Not Worry So Much about American Imperialism,” in Anxious About Empire: Theological Essays on the New Global Realities, ed. Wes Avram (Grand Rapids: Brazos Press, 2004), pp. 119–128. William T. Cavanaugh has criticized Webb's connection of providence and politics.

== Books on theology and sound ==
Webb is also known for his work in what he called theo-acoustics, or a theology of sound. He wrote a comprehensive history of Christianity and sound in The Divine Voice: Christian Proclamation and the Theology of Sound (Brazos Press, 2004). This book, which was named the Religious Communication Association's Book of the Year for 2005 and a Christianity Today Top Ten Book of 2004, is divided into three parts. The first part surveys the biblical tradition on the importance of the human voice as a medium of revelation in the Bible. The second part focuses on the Protestant Reformation as the revival of that tradition. The third part discusses the transformations of that tradition in contemporary culture, which is increasingly oriented toward the visual over the auditory. He also discusses the role of deafness in Christian history and various theological debates over the question of how God created the world through sound. In this discussion he reveals his battle with hearing loss and how that has affected his theological work. He ends that book talking about wordless music and the decline of authentic vocalization in rock and roll, so it was a natural progression to turn to Bob Dylan in his next book, Dylan Redeemed: From Highway 61 to Saved (Continuum, 2006). This book, which has been written about in many Dylan blogs, is a reassessment of Bob Dylan's musical career that focuses on Dylan's mid-life conversion to Christianity.

== Books on literature ==
Webb wrote about C. S. Lewis in The Chronicles of Narnia and Philosophy (ed. by Jerry Walls, Open Court Publishing, 2005), Indiana small town basketball in Basketball and Philosophy (University of Kentucky Press, 2007), and eschatology and politics in The Oxford Handbook of Eschatology (Oxford University Press, 2008). He also wrote the commendation for John Updike for the Presentation of the Christianity and Literature Lifetime Achievement Award at the Modern Languages Association Meeting in December, 2006. His remarks, and Updike's generous response, appear in Christianity and Literature, vol. 56, No. 3 (Spring 2007), pp. 481–485, and Updike's response was subsequently published as the last essay in Updike's Higher Gossip (Knopf, 2011), pp. 479–481. Webb was also a frequent blogger and contributor to First Things and Books & Culture.

== Lectures ==
He delivered invited lectures at Aberdeen University, Calvin College, Wheaton College, Bangor Seminary, Maine, Virginia Theological Seminary, Arizona State University, Pepperdine University, Butler University, Brigham Young University, Hartford Seminary, Creighton University, Wilfrid Laurier University, Hope College, Kalamazoo College, Purdue University, Elmhurst College, and Loyola University in Baltimore. He gave the Truman Madsen Lecture at Brigham Young University in 2012, the first Inaugural "Animals and the Kingdom" lecture at Calvin College in 2008, the Kretzmann Lecture at Valparaiso University in 2008, and the Womack Lecture at Methodist University in 2014.

== Other books ==
He also wrote many essays on the intersection of rhetoric and religion, including "Reviving the Rhetorical Heritage of Protestant Theology," in A Companion to Rhetoric and Rhetorical Criticism, ed. Walter Jost and Wendy Olmsted (Oxford: Blackwell Publishing, 2004): 409–24, and "Theological Reflections on the Hyperbolic Imagination," in Rhetorical Invention and Religious Inquiry, ed. Walter Jost and Wendy Olmstead (New Haven: Yale University Press, 2000). The SAGE Handbook of Rhetorical Studies, ed. Andrea Lunsford (2008) lists him as a leader in the field of religious rhetoric (see p. 555).

Webb wrote a book critical of Darwinism, The Dome of Eden: A New Solution to the Problem of Creation and Evolution (Cascades, 2010). His book Jesus Christ, Eternal God: Heavenly Flesh and the Metaphysics of Matter (Oxford University Press, 2012), engages with Mormon theology in order to develop a revisionist account of Chalcedonian christology that seeks to redeem and appropriate monophysitism for modern theology. His essay in defense of Mormonism as a legitimate form of Christianity, "Mormonism Obsessed with Christ," appeared in First Things (February 2012) and was the topic of much discussion, including an opinion piece published in the Salt Lake Tribune co-authored by Mormon philosopher David L. Paulsen.

== Personal life ==
Stephen Webb lived in Brownsburg, Indiana with his wife, Diane Timmerman, who is a professor of theatre at Butler University, and their five children. He died by suicide on March 5, 2016, as the culmination of a long struggle with depression.

== Bibliography ==
- Catholic and Mormon: A Theological Conversation (Oxford, 2015)
- Mormon Christianity: What Non-Mormon Christians Can Learn from the Latter-day Saints (Oxford, 2013)
- Jesus Christ, Eternal God: Heavenly Flesh and the Metaphysics of Matter (Oxford, 2012)
- Dome of Eden: A New Solution to the Problem of Creation and Evolution (Cascades, 2010)
- Dylan Redeemed: From Highway 61 to Saved (Continuum, 2006; re-issued by Wipf & Stock in 2012)
- The Divine Voice: Christian Proclamation and the Theology of Sound (Brazos Press, 2004)
- American Providence: A Nation with a Mission (Continuum, 2004)
- Good Eating: The Bible, Diet and the Proper Love of Animals (Grand Rapids: Brazos Press/Baker, 2001)
- Taking Religion to School: Christian Theology and Secular Education (Brazos Press, 2000, 253 pages with notes)
- On God and Dogs: A Christian Theology of Compassion for Animals (Oxford University Press, 1998)
- The Gifting God: A Trinitarian Ethics of Excess (Oxford University Press, 1996)
- Blessed Excess: Religion and the Hyperbolic Imagination (SUNY Series in Rhetoric and Theology) (Albany: SUNY Press, 1993)
- Refiguring Theology: The Rhetoric of Karl Barth (SUNY, 1991)
