= Bonnie Ballif-Spanvill =

American psychologist

- Education: Brigham Young University
- Occupation: Professor

Bonnie Ballif-Spanvill is an American academic. She is a professor of psychology at Brigham Young University (BYU). From 1994 to 2010, she was the director of the BYU Women's Research Institute.

== Early life and education ==
The daughter of Ariel S. Ballif and Artemesia Romney, Bonnie Ballif-Spanvill attended Brigham Young High School in Provo, Utah and has a bachelor's degree and a Ph.D. both from Brigham Young University.

== Career ==
From 1966 to 1968, she was a faculty member at the University of Hawaiʻi at Mānoa. From 1968 to 1993, she was on the faculty of Fordham University. While there, she was chair of the Division of Psychology and Educational Services. In 1994, she joined the Brigham Young University faculty as a professor of Psychology and head of the Women's Research Institute.

Ballif-Spanvill is a fellow of the American Psychological Society and the American Psychological Association. Ballif-Spanvill's most cited work is "Preventing violence and teaching peace: A review of promising and effective antiviolence, conflict-resolution, and peace programs for elementary school children" which was co-authored with Claudia J. Clayton and Melanie D. Hunsaker. She was also an author of the article "Terrorist as Group Violence" in the Journal of Threat Assessment in 2003; "The Security of Women and the Security of States" with Valerie M. Hudson, Mary Caprioli, Rose McDermott and Chad F. Emmett published in International Security Vol. 33 issue 3 (Winter 2009). She has written multiple articles for the American Journal of Orthopsychiatry and coedited with Marilyn Arnold and Kristen Tracey A Chorus for Peace: A Global Anthology of Poetry by women published by the University of Iowa Press in 2002.

== Personal life ==
Ballif-Spanvill is married to Robert J. Spanvill.
