= Holy Spirit (Christian denominational variations) =

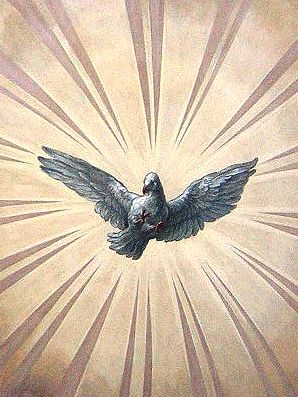
Fresco of the Pentecostal dove (representing the Holy Spirit) at the Karlskirche in Vienna, Austria

The different denominations of Christianity have variations in their teachings regarding the Holy Spirit.

A well-known example is the Filioque controversy, the debates centering on whether the Nicene Creed should state that the Spirit "proceeds from the Father" and then have a stop, as the creed was initially adopted in Greek (and followed thereafter by the Eastern Church), or should say "from the Father and the Son" as was later adopted in Latin and followed by the Western Church, "filioque" being "and the Son" in Latin.

The majority of mainstream Protestantism hold similar views on the theology of the Holy Spirit as the Roman Catholic Church, but there are significant differences in belief between Pentecostalism and the rest of Protestantism. The Charismatic Movement within mainstream Christian Churches has a focus on the "gifts of the Spirit", but differ from Pentecostal movements.

Non-trinitarian Christian views about the Holy Spirit differ significantly from mainstream Christian doctrine.

== Eastern Orthodoxy ==
Eastern Orthodoxy proclaims that the Father is the eternal source of the Godhead, from whom the Son is begotten eternally, and also from whom the Holy Spirit proceeds eternally. Unlike the Roman Catholic Church and Western Christianity in general, the Orthodox Church does not espouse the use of the Filioque ("and the Son") in describing the procession of the Holy Spirit. Filioque was mentioned for the first time at the Third Council of Toledo in 589 and it was added by the Roman Catholic Church to the Credo in the 11th century. The Holy Spirit is believed to eternally proceed from the Father, as Christ says in John 15:26, and not from the Father and the Son, as the Roman Catholic and Protestant churches claim. The Greek Orthodox Church teaches that the Holy Spirit proceeds through the Son, but only from the Father. The Eastern Orthodox position is that the Son sent the Holy Spirit at Pentecost only "in time, in human history, as part of the economy of our salvation" but not from eternity. Eastern Orthodox doctrine regarding the Holy Trinity is summarized in the Symbol of Faith (Nicene-Constantinopolitan Creed). Oriental Orthodox usage coincides with Eastern Orthodox usage and teachings on the matter. The Assyrian Church of the East also retains the original formula of the Creed without the Filioque.

== Roman Catholicism ==
"The Holy Spirit is the Third Person of the Blessed Trinity. Though really distinct, as a Person, from the Father and the Son, He is consubstantial with Them; being God like Them, He possesses with Them one and the same Divine Essence or Nature...It is by His operation that the Incarnation of the Word, is accomplished."

The Church is accustomed most fittingly to attribute to the Father those works of the Divinity in which power excels, to the Son those in which wisdom excels, and those in which love excels to the Holy Ghost...The Holy Ghost is the ultimate cause of all things, since, as the will and all other things finally rest in their end, so He, who is the Divine Goodness and the Mutual Love of the Father and Son, completes and perfects, by His strong yet gentle power, the secret work of man's eternal salvation.

The Holy Spirit is the Master of Prayer. In Romans 8:26-27, Paul says, "In the same way, the Spirit helps us in our weakness. We do not know what we ought to pray for, but the Spirit himself intercedes for us with groans that words cannot express. And the one who searches hearts knows what is the intention of the Spirit, because it intercedes for the holy ones according to God’s will."

To the Holy Spirit is attributed the operations of grace and the sanctification of souls, and in particular spiritual gifts and fruits. The gifts of the Holy Spirit are of two kinds:

- The first, mentioned in Isaiah (11:2-3), are specially intended for the sanctification of the person who receives them. They are wisdom, understanding, counsel, fortitude, knowledge, piety (godliness), and fear of the Lord. The fruits of the Holy Spirit are traditionally listed as charity, joy, peace, patience, kindness, goodness, generosity, gentleness, faithfulness, modesty, self-control, and chastity.
- The second, more properly called charismata, are extraordinary favours granted for the help of others. They are listed in (1 Corinthians 12:8-10): "The word of wisdom, the word of knowledge, faith, the grace of healing, the working of miracles, prophecy, the discerning of spirits, diverse kinds of tongues, interpretation of speeches".

Around the 6th century, the word Filioque was added to the Nicene Creed, defining as a doctrinal teaching that the Holy Ghost "proceedeth from the Father and the Son". The Latin fathers affirm that the Holy Ghost proceeds from the Father and "from" the Son, the Eastern fathers generally say that He proceeds from the Father "through" the Son. In reality the thought expressed by both Greeks and Latins is one and the same, only the manner of expressing it is slightly different. While the Eastern-rite Catholic Churches are required to believe the doctrinal teaching contained in the Filioque, they are not all required to insert it in the Creed when it is recited during the Divine Liturgy, so as to use the liturgical text as it was in antiquity.

== Protestantism ==
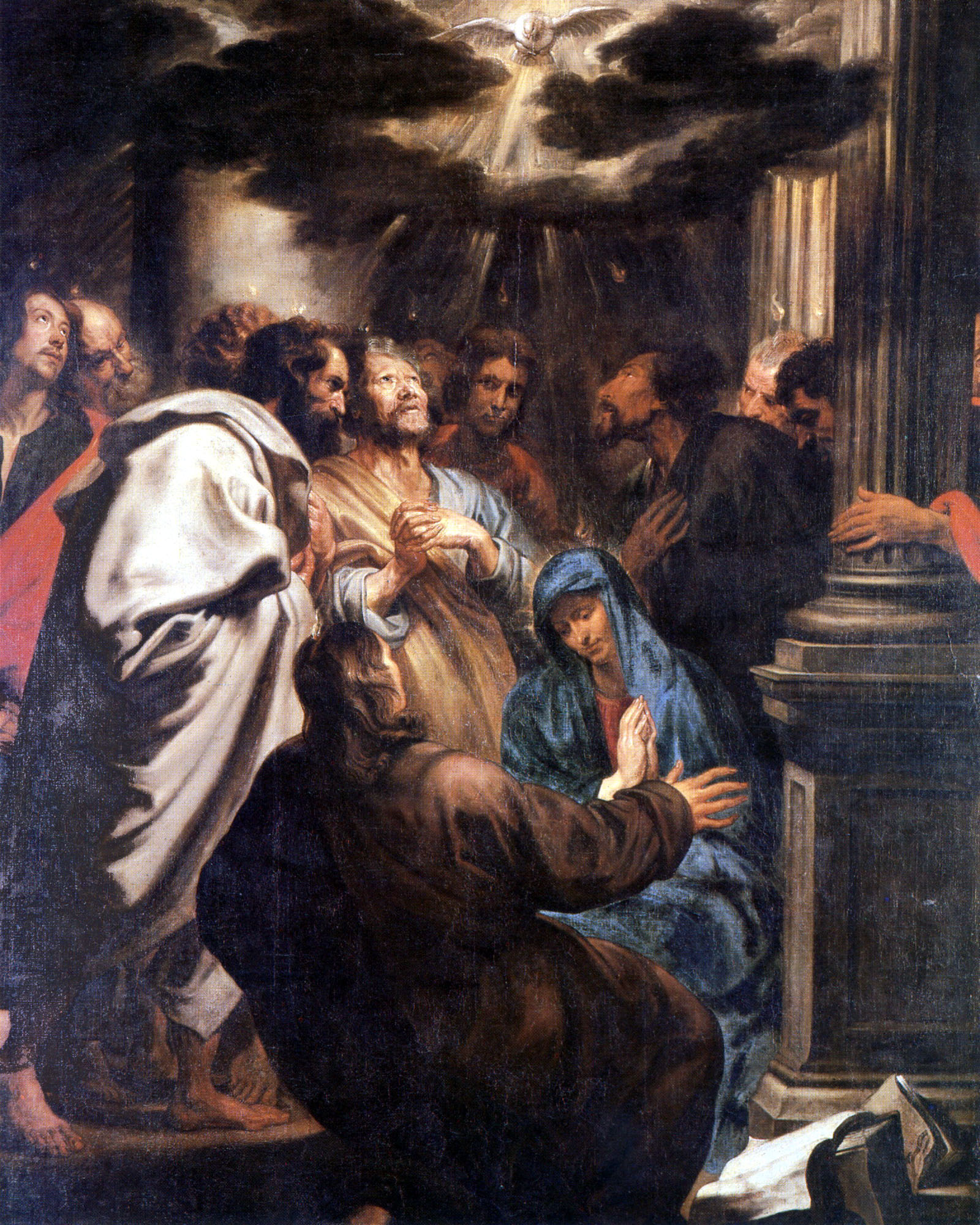
The Holy Spirit descending at Pentecost by Anthony van Dyck, circa 1618.

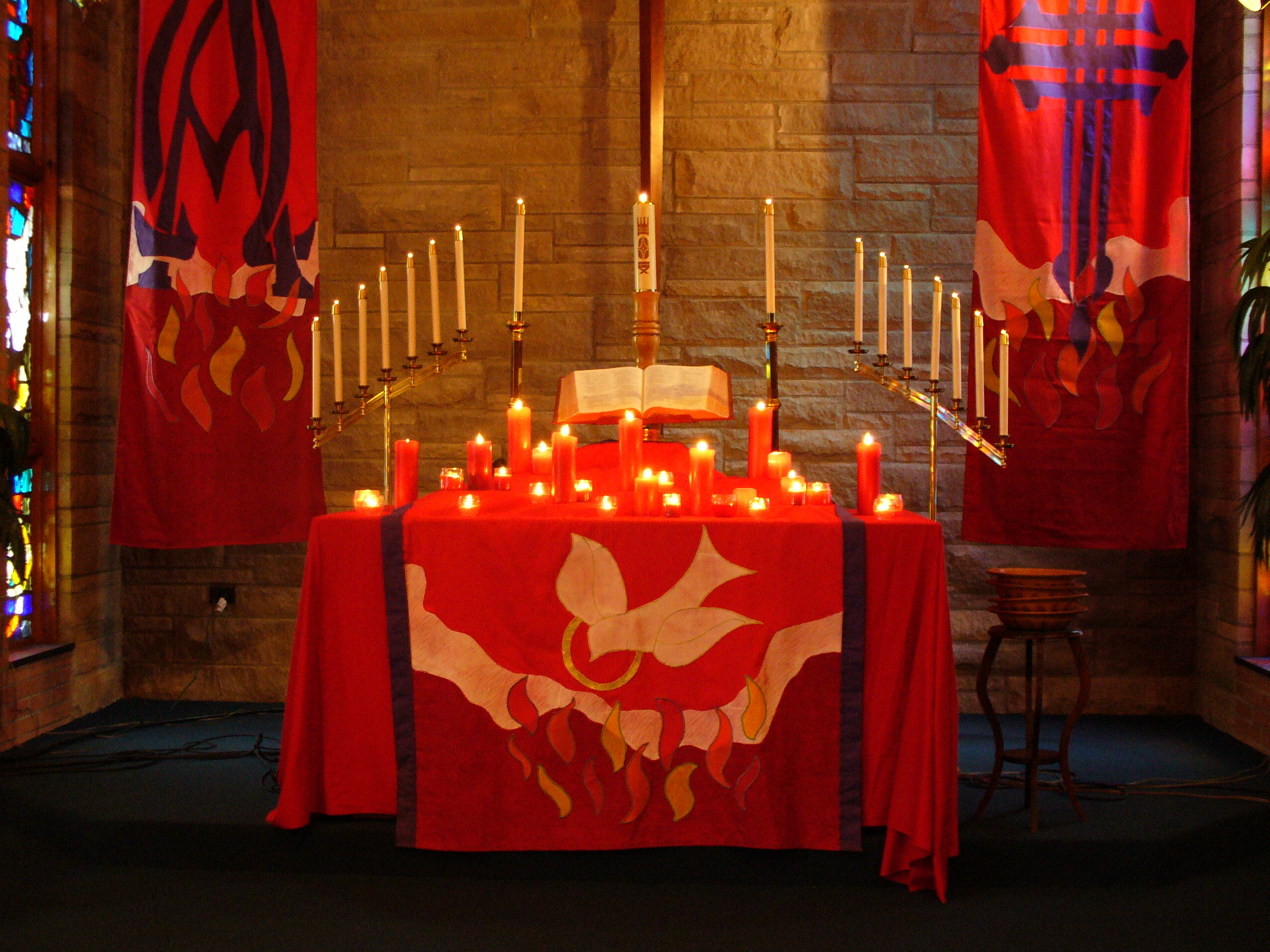
A Protestant church altar at Pentecost with an altar parament depicting the movement of the Holy Spirit

The majority of mainstream Protestantism hold similar views on the theology of the Holy Spirit as the Roman Catholic Church, as described above.

=== Lutheranism ===
The theologian Mark Ellingsen noted that "Lutherans have a strong doctrine of the Holy Spirit, giving the Spirit credit for working all things pertinent to salvation and following Jesus (Small Catechism, II.6)." The Apology of the Augsburg Confession teaches:

…having been justified by faith, we have received the Holy Spirit and “spiritual impulses in our hearts” so that “we begin to fear and love God, to pray for and expect help from him, to thank and praise him, and to obey him in our afflictions. We also begin to love our neighbor because our hearts have spiritual and holy impulses” (IV, 125).

The Augsburg Confession teaches that “Because the Holy Spirit is given through faith, the heart is also moved to do good works” (XX, 31). In On the Councils and the Church (1539), Martin Luther emphasized that it was important for Evangelical Lutheran priests to proclaim both Christ's redemption and the Holy Spirit's work of sanctification; he wrote that “Christ did not earn only gratia, ‘grace,’ for us, but also donum, ‘the gift of the Holy Spirit,’ so that we might have not only forgiveness of, but also cessation of, sin.” The Evangelical Lutheran tradition holds that the Holy Spirit "unites us to Christ in his death and resurrection through a life of repentance, in his fight against the evil one through the Word and prayer, and in his sacrificial service to others through various gifts." The Evangelical Lutheran theologian Leopoldo Sánchez writes about the Holy Spirit's role in sanctification, as discussed in the Formula of Concord:

The Formula speaks about the believer’s “cooperation” with God in sanctification. After conversion, “the reborn human will is not idle in the daily exercise of repentance, but cooperates in all the works of the Holy Spirit which he performs in us” (Epitome, II, 17; cf. SD, II, 88). The regenerated human will becomes “an instrument and tool of God the Holy Spirit, in that the human will not only accepts grace but also cooperates with the Holy Spirit in the works that proceed from it” (Epitome, II, 18). Such cooperation must be understood in the sense that “the converted do good to the extent that God rules, leads, and guides them with his Holy Spirit,” but not as if the Spirit and the converted are equal partners “in the way two horses draw a wagon together” (SD, II, 66).

The Lutheran sacrament of confession and absolution is grounded in the biblical passage of John 20, in which Jesus bestows the Holy Spirit upon the Apostles to remit and retain sins; bishops exercise “the power of the keys … to preach the gospel, to forgive and retain sin, and to administer and distribute the sacraments” (XXVIII, 5–6).

=== Methodism ===
Methodist theology teaches:

The Holy Ghost proceeds from the Father and the Son (John 15:26), and is one with Them, ever present and efficiently active in and with the Church of Christ. As the Executive of the Godhead He convinces the world of sin (John 16:8), regenerates those who repent (John 3:5), sanctifies believers (Acts 15:8, 9), and guides all into the truth as the truth is in Jesus (John 16:13). ―Principles of Faith, Emmanuel Association of Churches

=== Pentecostalism ===
While the Holy Spirit is acknowledged as God in all mainstream denominations, he is given particular emphasis in Pentecostal churches. In those churches he is seen as the giver of natural and supernatural gifts, such as tongues and prophecy, to modern-day Christians.

The Christian movement called Pentecostalism derives its name from the event of Pentecost, the coming of the Holy Spirit when Jesus' disciples were gathered in Jerusalem. Pentecostals believe that when a believer is "baptized in the Holy Spirit", the gifts of the Spirit (also called the charismata) are activated in the recipient to edify the body of Christ, the church. Some of these gifts are listed in 1 Corinthians 12.

The Pentecostal movement places special emphasis on the work of the Holy Spirit, and especially on the gifts mentioned above, believing that they are still given today. Much of Pentecostalism differentiates the "baptism with the Holy Spirit" from the salvific born again experience, considering it a usually distinct experience in which the Spirit's power is received by the Christian in a new way, with the belief that the Christian can be more readily used to perform signs, miracles, and wonders for the sake of evangelism or for ministry within the church (the body of Christ) and the community. There are also some Pentecostals who believe that Spirit baptism is a necessary element in salvation, not a "second blessing". These Pentecostals believe that in the baptism in the Holy Spirit, the power of the Spirit is released in their lives.

Many Pentecostals believe that the normative initial evidence of this infilling (baptism) of the Holy Spirit is the ability to speak in other tongues (glossolalia), and that tongues are one of several spiritual manifestations of the presence of the Holy Spirit in an individual believer's life.

There are significant differences in belief between Pentecostalism and the rest of Protestantism.

== Restoration Movement and Churches of Christ ==
During the late 19th century, the prevailing view in the Restoration Movement was that the Holy Spirit currently acts only through the influence of inspired scripture. This rationalist view was associated with Alexander Campbell, who was "greatly affected by what he viewed as the excesses of the emotional camp meetings and revivals of his day." He believed that the Spirit draws people towards salvation, but understood the Spirit to do this "in the same way any person moves another—by persuasion with words and ideas." This view came to prevail over that of Barton W. Stone, who believed the Spirit had a more direct role in the life of the Christian. Since the mid-late 20th century, many among the Churches of Christ have moved away from this "word-only" theory of the operation of the Holy Spirit. As one student of the movement puts it, "[f]or better or worse, those who champion the so-called word-only theory no longer have a hold on the minds of the constituency of Churches of Christ. Though relatively few have adopted outright charismatic and third wave views and remained in the body, apparently the spiritual waves have begun to erode that rational rock."

== Non-Trinitarian views ==
Non-trinitarian views about the Holy Spirit differ significantly from mainstream Christian doctrine and generally fall into several distinct categories.

=== Unitarian and Arian ===
Groups with Unitarian theology such as Polish Socinians, the 18th-19th Century Unitarian Church, and Christadelphians conceive of the Holy Spirit not as a person but an aspect of God's power. Christadelphians believe that the phrase Holy Spirit refers to God's power, mind or character depending on the context.

Though Arius believed that the Holy Spirit is a person or high angel, that had a beginning, modern Semi-Arian groups such as Dawn Bible Students and Jehovah's Witnesses believe that the Holy Spirit is not an actual person but is God's "power in action", "breath" or "divine energy", which had no beginning, and which proceeds only out of the Father, and through the Son, which the Father uses to accomplish his will. Jehovah's Witnesses do not typically capitalize the term, and define the Holy Spirit as "God's active force".

=== Binitarianism ===
Armstrongites, such as the Living Church of God, believe that the Logos and God the Father are co-equal and co-eternal, but they do not believe that the Holy Spirit is an actual person, like the Father and the Son. They believe the Holy Spirit is the Power, Mind, or Character of God, depending on the context. They teach, "The Holy Spirit is the very essence, the mind, life and power of God. It is not a Being. The Spirit is inherent in the Father and the Son, and emanates from Them throughout the entire universe". Mainstream Christians characterise this teaching as the heresy of Binitarianism, the teaching that God is a "Duality", the Father and the Word, or "two-in-one", rather than three.

=== Modalist groups ===
Oneness Pentecostalism, as with other modalist groups, teach that the Holy Spirit is a mode of God, rather than a distinct or separate person from the Father. They instead teach that the Holy Spirit is just another name for the Father. According to Oneness theology, the Holy Spirit essentially is the Father. The United Pentecostal Church teaches that there is no personal distinction between God the Father, the Son, and the Holy Spirit.

These two titles "Father" and "Holy Spirit" (as well as others) do not reflect separate "persons" within the Godhead, but rather two different ways in which the one God reveals himself to his creatures. Thus, the Old Testament speaks of "The Lord God and his Spirit" in Isaiah 48:16, but this does not indicate two "persons" according to Oneness theology. Rather, "The Lord" indicates God in all of His glory and transcendence, while the words "His Spirit" refer to God's own Spirit that moved upon and spoke to the prophet. The Oneness view is that this does not imply two "persons" any more than the numerous scriptural references to a man and his spirit or soul (such as in Luke 12:19) imply two "persons" existing within one body.

=== Latter Day Saints ===
In the Church of Jesus Christ of Latter Day Saints, the Holy Ghost (usually synonymous with Holy Spirit) is considered the third distinct member of the Godhead (Father, Son and Holy Ghost), and to have a body of "spirit," which makes him unlike the Father and the Son who are said to have bodies "as tangible as man's." According to LDS doctrine, the Holy Spirit is believed to be a person, however having a body of spirit, he is able to pervade all worlds. Latter-day Saints believe that the Holy Spirit is part of the "Divine Council" or "Godhead", but that the Father is greater than both the Son and the Holy Spirit.

However, a number of Latter Day Saint sects, most notably the Community of Christ (second largest Latter Day Saint denomination) and the Church of Christ (Temple Lot), and those sects separating from the Community of Christ and Church of Christ, follow a traditional Protestant trinitarian theology.

=== Other groups ===
The Unity Church interprets the religious terms Father, Son, and Holy Spirit metaphysically, as three aspects of mind action: mind, idea, and expression. They believe this is the process through which all manifestation takes place.

As a movement that developed out of Christianity, Rastafari has its own unique interpretation of both the Holy Trinity and the Holy Spirit. Although there are several slight variations, they generally state that it is Haile Selassie who embodies both God the Father and God the Son, while the Holy (or rather, "Hola") Spirit is to be found within Rasta believers (see 'I and I'), and within every human being. Rastas also say that the true church is the human body, and that it is this church (or "structure") that contains the Holy Spirit.
