= Seafield Tower =

Architectural structure in Fife, Scotland

- Fife, Scotland
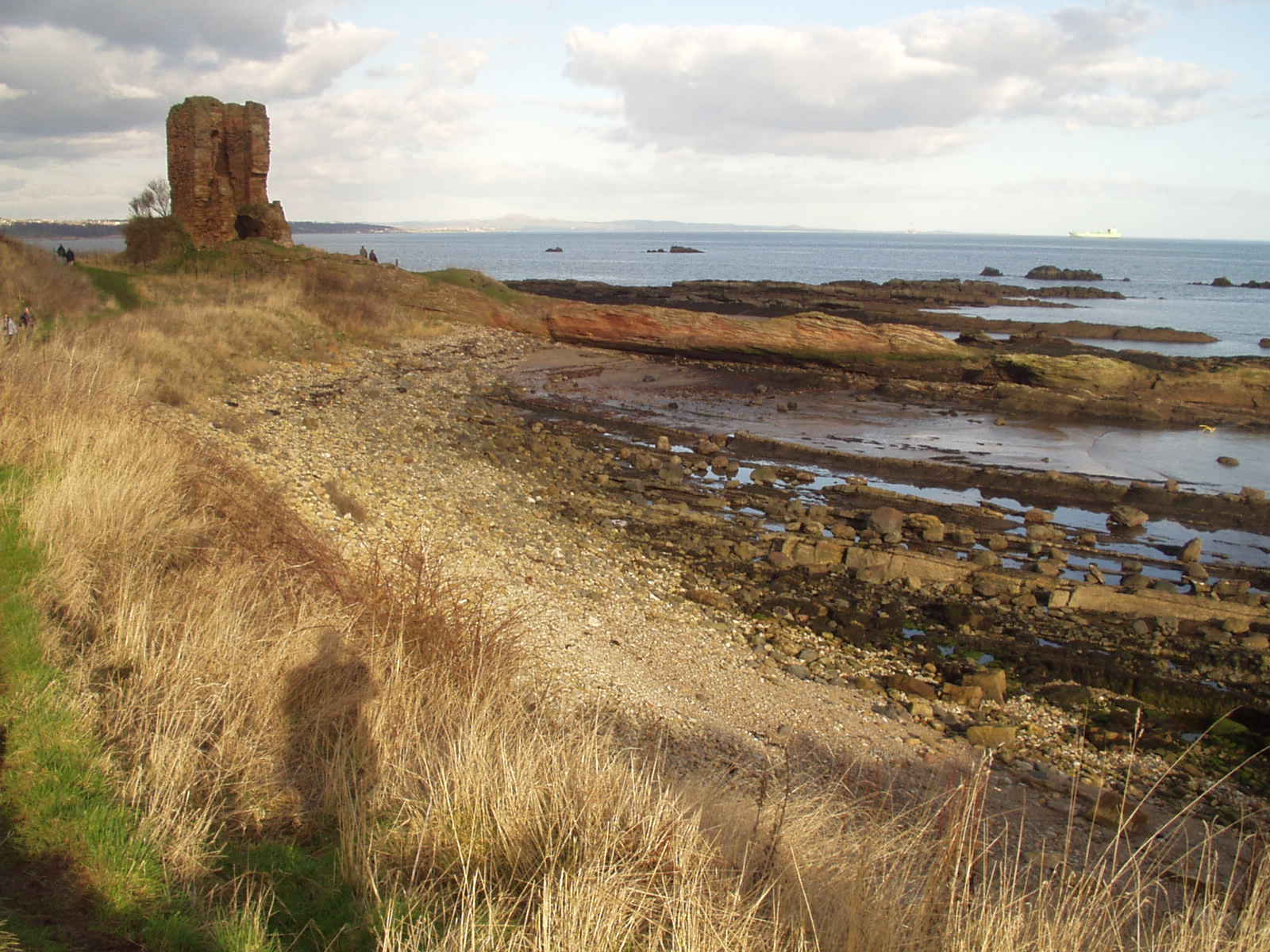

Site information
- Type: Tower-house and courtyard
- Condition: Ruined

Location
- Coordinates: 56.08295°N 3.16011°W

Site history
- Built: c. 1542
- Built by: John Moultray
- In use: Until 1733
- Materials: Sandstone

Designations

Scheduled monument
- Official name: Seafield Tower
- Designated: 2 March 1937
- Reference no.: SM873

Seafield Tower is a ruined castle on the North Sea coast of Fife in Scotland (grid reference NT279884). The monument is also referred to as a 'Medieval Tower House'.

The tower is located on the route of the Fife Coastal Path.

== History ==
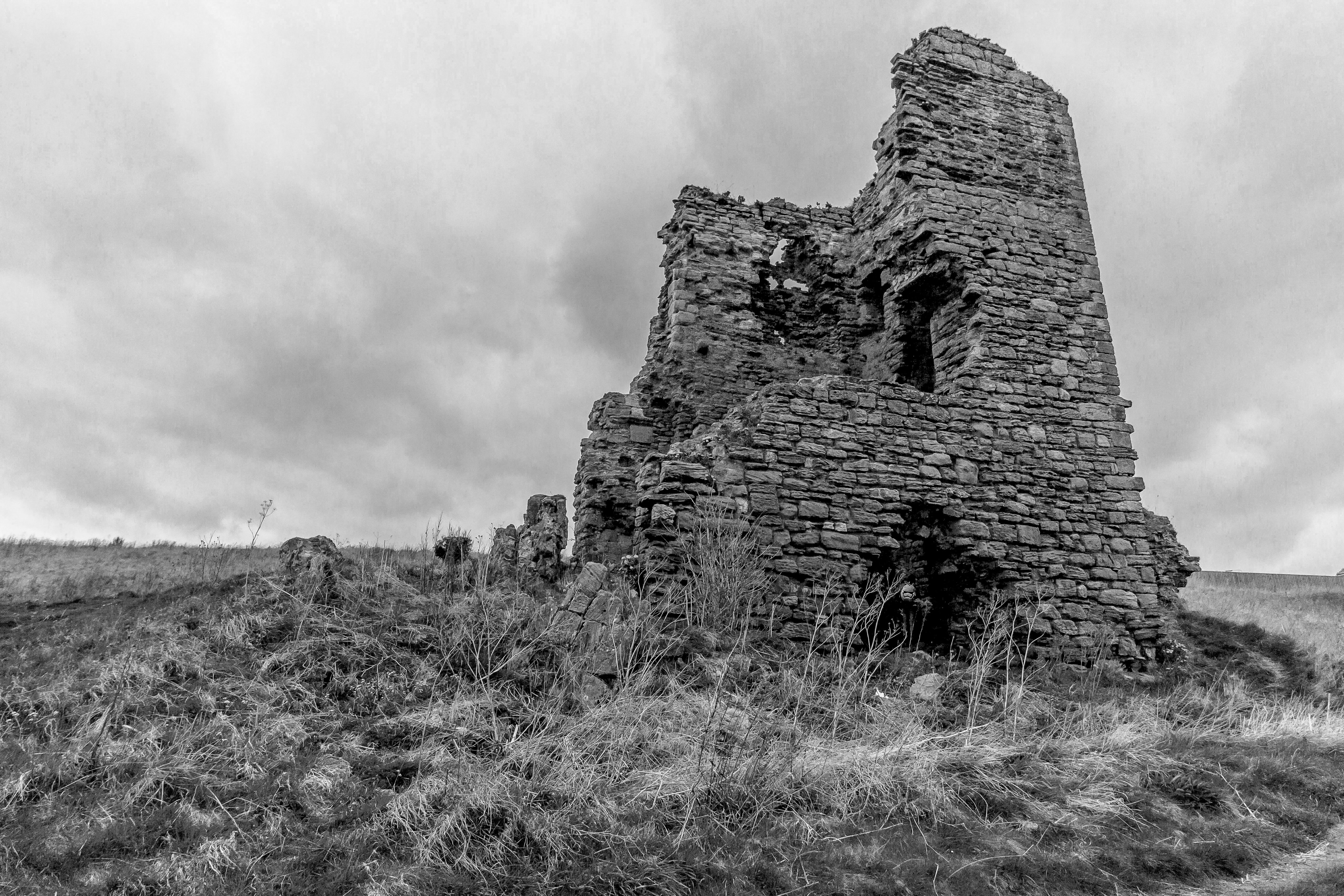
Seafield Tower

Built in the 16th century, Seafield Tower lies between Kinghorn and Kirkcaldy in Fife, Scotland. The lands of Seafield and Markinch were granted to Robert Multrare by James II of Scotland in 1443. The lands and the tower remained in the ownership of the Multray family (or Moultrie as the family name became) until 1631 when the lands were sold to James Law, the Archbishop of Glasgow. With Law's death in 1632, the tower passed through various owners. The Methven family were the last known owners of the tower. Its last owner was Methven of Raith who abandoned it in 1733, leaving it to it fall into disrepair and, eventually, ruin.

The completed tower was believed to be five stories high with walls 5 feet (1.5 m) thick and maximum internal dimensions of 20 feet 2 inches (6.1 m) by 14 feet 4 inches (4.4 m). It was constructed in an 'L' shape configuration using local red sandstone. The Tower would have had a vaulted storage area on the ground floor and a Great Hall on the first floor. The upper levels would have been the lord's accommodation. A plan from 1774 shows ancillary buildings - including a bakery, brewery and stables - which were located in an enclosure to the west of the Tower. These buildings would normally have been protected by a barmkin (curtain wall) but, unfortunately, any evidence of this has been lost due to coastal erosion.

As it stands today, the ruin is merely a shell in derelict condition. Following a storm in January 2013, a significant part of the northwest corner of the tower collapsed.

== Scheduled monument ==
Between 1973 and 2015 the remains of the tower were designated a Category B listed building by Historic Scotland. The tower was removed from Category B in 2015 as, since 2003, the tower and its surrounding area (which has been scheduled since 1937) have been designated as one combined scheduled monument.

== Images ==
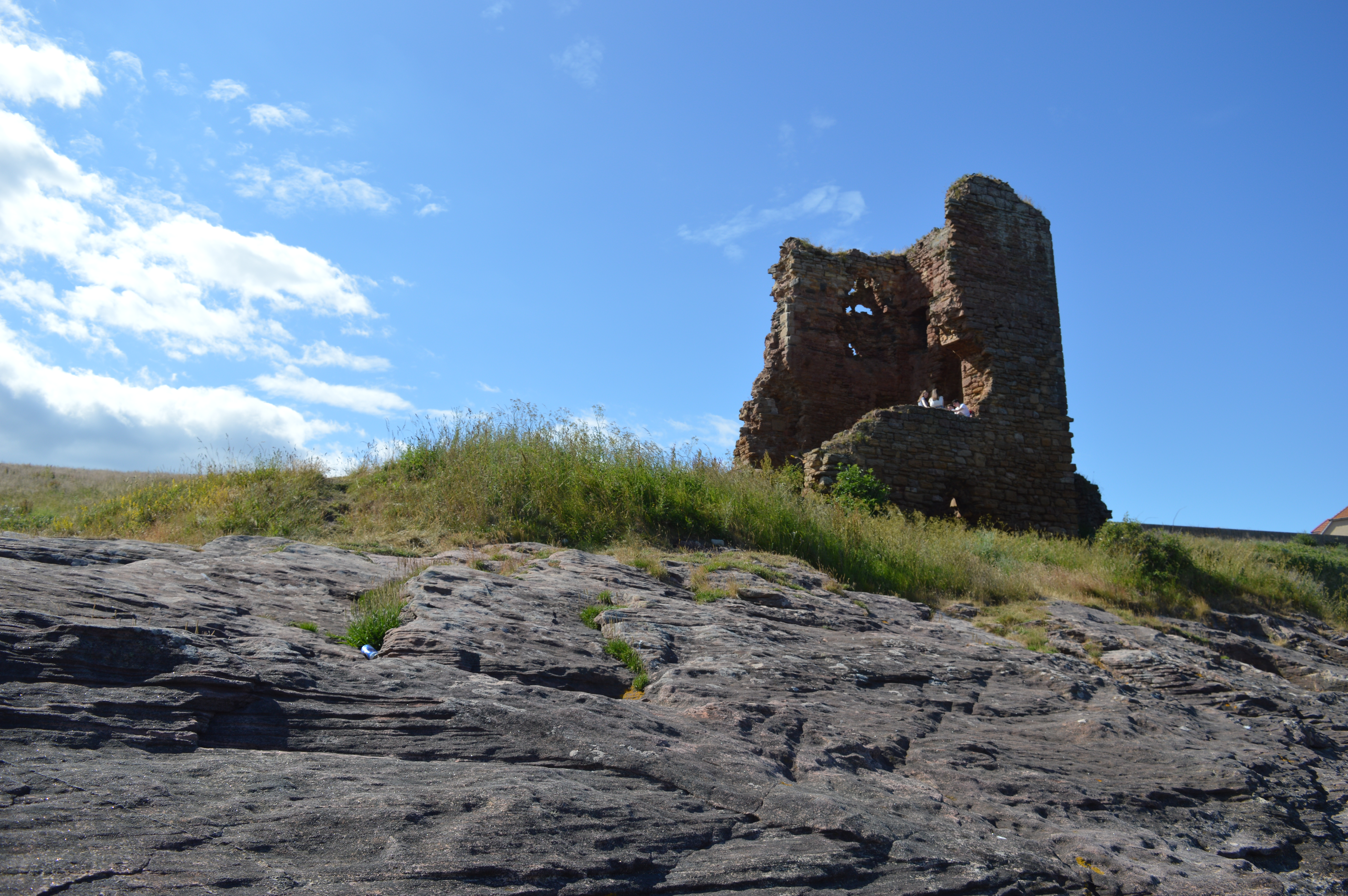

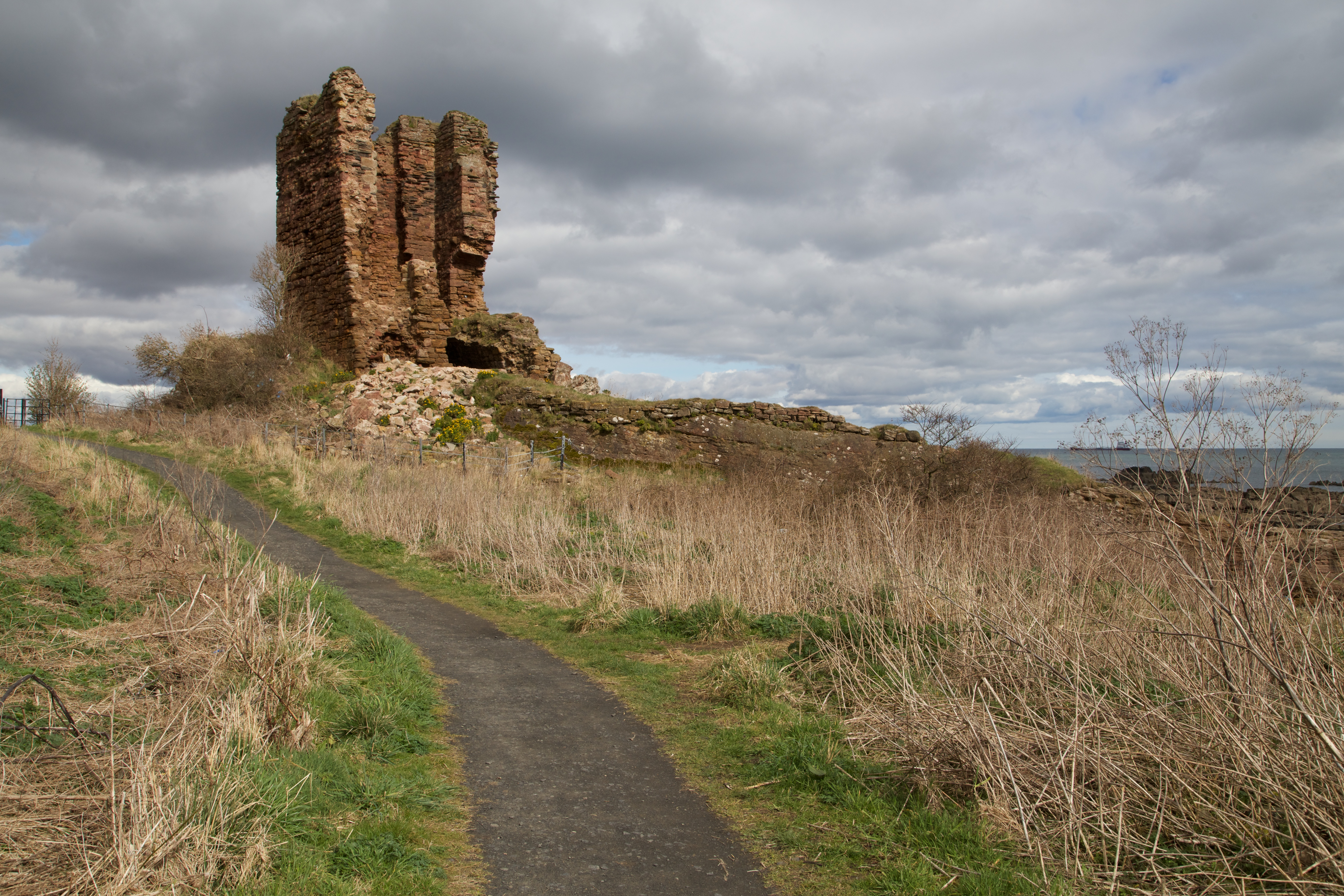

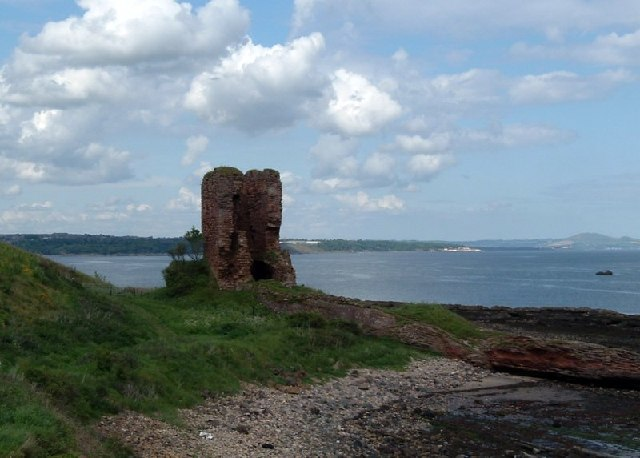

== See also ==
- List of places in Fife
- Schedules monuments in Fife
- Medieval Scotland
