= David Orgon Coolidge =

David Orgon Collidge (died 2002) was the founder of The Marriage Law Project (MLP) and was an editor, along with Lynn D. Wardle and Alan J. Hawkins, of the book Revitalizing Marriage in the Twenty-First Century: An Agenda for Strengthening Marriage.

Collidge's article "Marriage is not Meant for Same-gender couples" was published in the Los Angeles Times on February 28, 2000. Coolidge has written widely on the issues of marriage and the law, including "Beyond Baker: The Case for a Vermont Marriage Amendment" which was written with his MLP college William C. Duncan. Coolidge also edited with Wardle, Duncan and Mark Strasser the book Marriage and Same-Sex Unions: A Debate.

Coolidge received his bachelor's degree from Williams College, his M.A. from Howard University School of Divinity and his J.D. from the Georgetown University Law Center.

Coolidge was also a professor at the Columbus School of Law of The Catholic University of America.

Among many other legal cases which he commented on, Coolidge disagreed with the New Jersey court ruling in James Dale's case against the Boy Scouts of America for removing him for violating the requirement of being morally straight. Among other points, Coolidge argued that the court was wrong in finding the exclusion of gay men to be a recent development on the part of the Boy Scouts.

Coolidge died of cancer in 2002. He was survived by his wife Joan and three children.

== Sources ==
- Greenwood Press bio
- Ethics and Public Policy Center, The Catholic University of America, listing for Coolidge
