= Marriage Law Project =

The Marriage Law Project (MLP) is a public interest legal aid organization founded in 1996. It aims "to reaffirm marriage as the union of one man and one woman." Its offices are located in the Columbus School of Law at The Catholic University of America in Washington, D.C. Its founder, David Orgon Coolidge, was Senior Fellow at the Columbus School of Law Ethics and Public Policy Center and a Research Fellow in the Columbus School of Law Interdisciplinary Program in Law and Religion. William C. Duncan is assistant director of the Marriage Law Project.

The Marriage Law Project monitors the progress of state and federal legislation regarding marriage and same-sex unions. It provides information regarding headline news, current legislative progress, various arguments against same-sex marriage, case and statute law, news reports, and links to other resources. The Marriage Law Project is a frequent contributor as a spokesperson in the cultural homosexuality debates, especially from a Roman Catholic point of view. MLP participated in filing the injunction against San Francisco when that city's clerk decided to issue same-sex marriage licenses.

== Symposia ==
MLP and the Marriage and Family Law Project at Brigham Young University Law School co-hosted a symposium in September 2006 entitled "'What's the Harm?'—How Legalizing Same-Sex Marriage Will Harm Society, Families, Adults, Children and Marriage".

Another joint symposium by these schools was held February 1–3, 2001, and was entitled "The ALI Family Dissolution Principles: Blueprint to Strengthen or to Deconstruct Families?"

== Published works ==
The Marriage Law Project has continued to submit Amici Curiae briefs in court cases and appeals regarding equal marriage all over the United States. Articles have been published in several law journals.
