= Picardy (hymn) =

Hymn tune based on a French carol

Picardy is a hymn tune used in Christian churches, based on a French carol; it is in a minor key and its meter is 8.7.8.7.8.7. Its name comes from the province of France from where it is thought to originate. The tune dates back at least to the 17th century, and was originally used for the folk song "Jésus-Christ s'habille en pauvre". First published in the 1848 collection Chansons populaires des provinces de France, "Picardy" was most famously arranged by Ralph Vaughan Williams in 1906 for the hymn "Let All Mortal Flesh Keep Silence", in the English Hymnal, the words of which are taken from the Byzantine Greek Liturgy of St. James translated by Gerard Moultrie, a chaplain at Shrewsbury School.

In addition, Gustav Holst used the hymn in his "3 Festival Choruses" Op. 36a.

While the tune is most commonly sung to the words "Let all mortal flesh keep silence", it is also set to other words, including "Christians, let us love one another" and 'You, Lord, are both lamb and shepherd".

== See also ==
- Picardy third, a device used in some harmonizations of this tune (e.g. Holst, John Rutter) but not others (e.g. Vaughan Williams, Denis Bédard) and not inherently connected, despite the name.
