= Gerard Moultrie =

Gerald Moultrie (16 September 1829 in Rugby Rectory, Warwickshire – 25 April 1885 in Southleigh, England) was a Victorian public schoolmaster and Anglican hymnographer.

== Biography ==
His father, John Moultrie was also a hymn writer. He was educated at Rugby School and Exeter College, Oxford. He received his BA in 1851 and his MA in 1856 from Oxford. Taking Holy Orders, he held a number of positions. He became Third Master and Chaplain in Shrewsbury School; Chaplain to the Dowager Marchioness of Londonderry (1855–59); Curate of Brightwalton (1859); and of Brinfield, Berkshire (1860); Chaplain of the Donative of Barrow Gurney, Bristol (1864); Vicar of Southleigh (1869); and Warden of St. James' College, Southleigh (1873). He wrote multiple hymns, along with some hymn translations, including Let All Mortal Flesh Keep Silence. He published several hymn books among which the Cantica Sanctorum (1850), Hymns and Lyrics for the Seasons and Saints' Days of the Church (1867). He died on 25 April 1885 in Southleigh, England, aged 55.

== Work ==
Moultrie's published works include:

- Cantica Sanctorum; or, Hymns for the Black Letter Saints Days in the English and Scottish Calendars, 1850.
- The Primer Set Forth at Large for the Use of the Faithful, 1864.
- Hymns from the Post Reformation Editions, 1864.
- The Devout Communicant, 1867.
- Hymns and Lyrics for the Seasons and Saints' Days of the Church, 1867.
- The Espousals of S. Dorothea, and Other Verses, 1870.
- Six Years' Work in Southleigh: a Report, 1875.

== Hymns ==
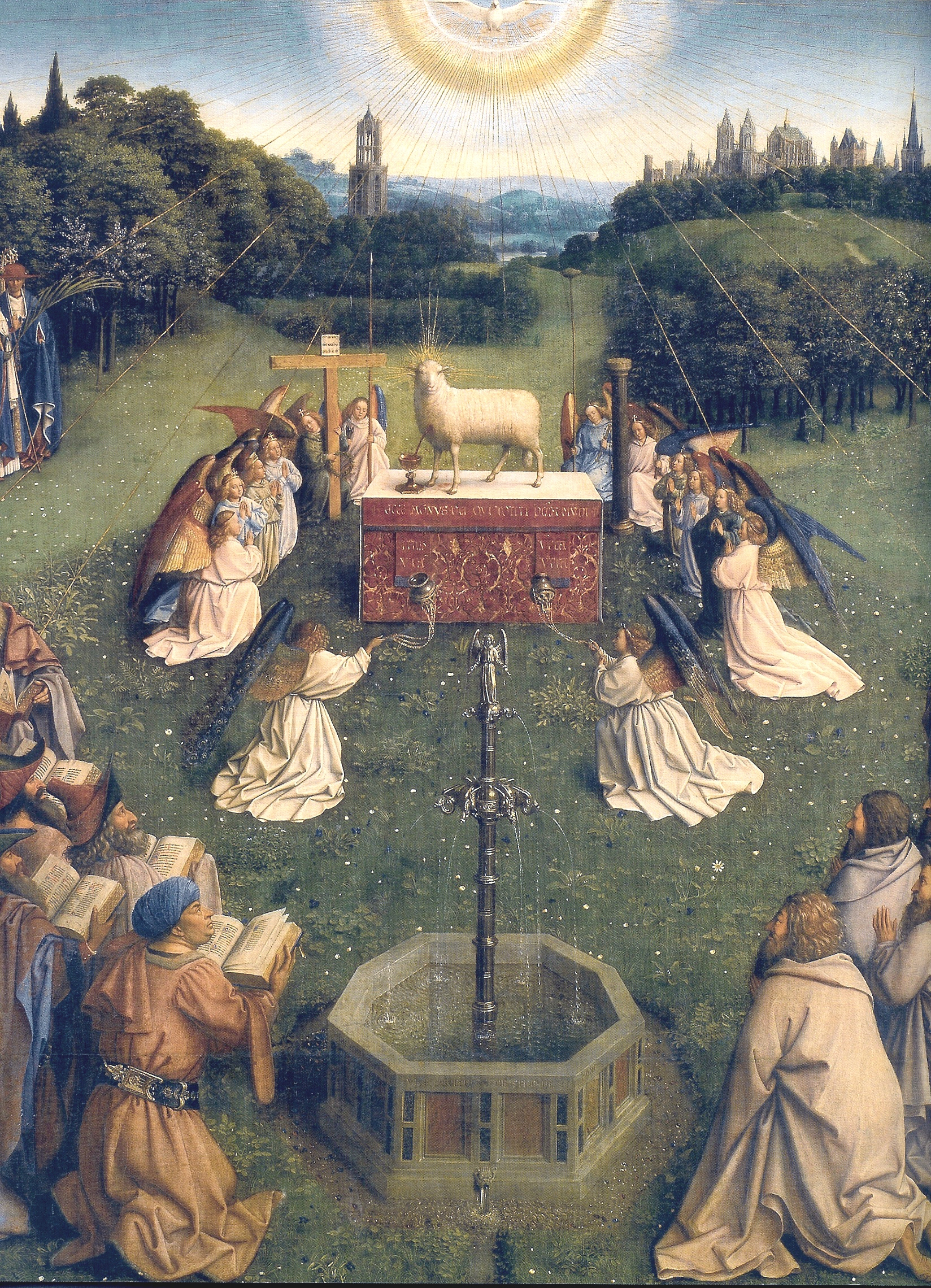
Vision from Book of Revelation of the heavenly hosts and communion of saints worshipping the atoning Sacrificial lamb as depicted on the Ghent Altarpiece

Moultrie composed hymns of traditional Christian piety based on devotion to Mary the mother of Jesus, the Angelic Hosts and the Communion of Saints at the Eschaton in the vein of High Church reverence for the transcendent prevalent in the celebration of liturgy in his time. A sampling includes

- A Tale of the olden Time
- Bishop of the Souls of Men
- Come, Faithul People
- Jesus, Tender Shepherd
- Lo, the Sacrifice Atoning
- Marriage Feast Is Ready, The
- Mary, Maiden Undefiled
- Mother, from Whose Bosom's Veil
- There Is a Sound of Rejoicing Around the Great Throne
- Virgin Born the King of Heaven
- We march to victory

The lyrics for which he is most renowned are his translation from the Greek of the Offertory chant of the Cherubic Hymn taken from the 4th century AD Byzantine Divine Liturgy of St. James, popularly known by the first line of the first verse "Let All Mortal Flesh Keep Silence" arranged by Ralph Vaughan Williams to the tune Picardy.

== See also ==
- Liturgy of St. James
- Liturgy of Saint James (Transcription)
- Picardy (hymn)
- Oxford Movement
