= John Moultrie, Jr. =

American-born doctor and planter

John Moultrie
- John Moultrie
- Born: 18 January 1729; Charleston; Province of South Carolina
- Died: 1798 (aged 68–69); Shropshire, England
- Occupation: Governor of East Florida

John Moultrie, Jr. (18 January 1729 – 1798) was an American-born doctor and planter who served as deputy governor of East Florida in the years before the American Revolutionary War. He became acting governor when his predecessor, James Grant, was invalided home in 1771 and held the position until 1774. Moultrie again became a deputy under his successor, Patrick Tonyn, returning to Great Britain in 1784.

== Early life and education ==
Moultrie's father, John Moultrie, born in the parish of Culross, Fife, in 1702, was the only son of Catherine Craik and John Moultrie. Moultrie Sr. was educated at Edinburgh, became a surgeon in the Royal Navy, and emigrated to Charlestown in 1728. On April 22 that same year, he married Lucretia Cooper, daughter of Dr. Barnard Christian Cooper of Goose Creek. Their eldest son, John Jr., was born in 1729, and graduated from the University of Edinburgh in 1749 at the age of twenty-one. He returned to South Carolina in 1749 as a physician, being one of a relatively small group of Americans who could lay claim to such a record of scholarship.

== Personal life ==
John Moultrie Jr. was the first of his family to be born in America, and he was the first native of the country to graduate in medicine from Edinburgh University. His thesis was a dissertation on yellow fever in Latin, De Febre Maligna Biliosa Americae (On the American Malignant Bilious Fever), one of the earliest clinical descriptions of the disease in North America. The work was based on his detailed observations of the Charleston epidemic of 1745, while he was assisting his father as an apprentice, and of his own experience with a mild case of the disease.

He married Dorothy Dry Morton in 1753, a widow who had a large fortune. On January 5, 1762, he married Eleanor Austin, the only daughter of Captain George Austin and Ann Ball. Moultrie and Eleanor Austin had four sons. After practicing as a doctor in Charlestown, Moultrie moved to East Florida in 1767 and became a planter. There he acquired land grants for himself and for the children of his brother James, who had died in 1765. His tracts totaled more than 14,000 acres, among them "Bella Vista", his estate four miles south of St. Augustine, where he planted fruit trees, built a stone mansion as his home, and laid out the grounds with a garden and park. Within a few years after the British took over Florida, indigo and sugar were produced at a profit, and Moultrie was experimenting with rice on one of his plantations south of Woodcutter's Creek, now known as Moultrie Creek. Moultrie became lieutenant-governor of the Province of East Florida in 1771, and held that office throughout the Revolution.

Following the Revolutionary War and the loss of Florida by the British, Moultrie moved to England, where he settled at Aston Hall, which his wife had inherited from her father, at Shifnal in Shropshire, and died there in 1798. He was buried at Shifnal Church. In 1809, his daughter Cecilia married the naval officer John Bligh at St Marylebone. Moultrie's grandson, John Moultrie, was an English clergyman hymn-writer. His great-grandson, Gerard Moultrie, was also a hymn-writer.

=== Family ===
Of his brothers, three were other key players on opposing sides of the Revolutionary War:

- William Moultrie (1730–1805) was a Patriot General of the Continental Army.
- James Moultrie (died 1765) was Chief Justice of British East Florida.
- Captain Thomas Moultrie was commanding officer of the 2nd South Carolina Regiment of the Continental Army.
- Colonel Alexander Moultrie was the first Attorney General of South Carolina from 1776 to 1792.

Preceded by General James Grant	Governor of British East Florida; 1771–1774	Succeeded by General Patrick Tonyn
