= King Follett =

Mormon elder and prisoner of 1838 Mormon War

Elder King Follett
- Born: July 26, 1788; Winchester, New Hampshire, United States
- Died: March 9, 1844 (aged 55); Nauvoo, Illinois, United States
- Occupations: Farmer; police constable
- Known for: King Follett discourse

King Follett (or Follet; July 26, 1788 – March 9, 1844) was a Mormon elder and a close friend of Joseph Smith. An early convert to the Church of Christ in 1831, he was a police constable and was notably the last prisoner released in the 1838 Mormon War. Shortly after his death, Smith delivered a notable sermon in memory of Follett in which he introduced new teachings to members of the church which Smith founded.

== Biography ==
Follett was born in Winchester, New Hampshire, on July 24 or 26, 1788. His parents were John Follett IV and Hannah (née Oakes) Alexander. He married Louisa Tanner in 1815. The couple had nine children.

He later moved with his family to Cuyahoga County, Ohio. There, he heard the Mormon religion preached, and he and Louisa converted and were baptized in the spring of 1831. By 1833, he had settled, along with many members of the Church, in Missouri, and was living with the Whitmer branch, a large extended family living in Jackson County. That year, he moved to Clay County, Missouri. In 1835, he settled in what would become Caldwell County, Missouri. He was ordained a Mormon elder on January 28, 1836, in Kirtland, Geauga County, Ohio. Though it is not confirmed, Follett was likely ordained a high priest in April 1837.

Follett participated in the 1838 Mormon War. He was imprisoned for several months at Richmond and later Columbia. After a long delay, he obtained a trial, where he was honorably discharged and was acquitted of the charges against him. He was the last Mormon detainee of the Missouri conflict to be released from prison. In 1839, Follett moved with his family to Nauvoo, Illinois. There, he worked as a police constable for Hancock County, and according to family lore, as a personal bodyguard for Joseph Smith. Follett was a Freemason and an officer in the Nauvoo Legion.

== Death and legacy ==
Follett died on March 9, 1844, in Nauvoo, aged 55. He was killed when a bucket of rocks fell on his head while he was working on a well. Follett was building the walls of the well, and while other men were lowering the tub of rocks, the rope snapped. He was buried on March 10 with Masonic honors. At his funeral, a procession exceeding one mile in length followed his remains to his house.

After his death, Louisa and the children moved to Iowa. There, some of Follett's children became involved with the Church of Jesus Christ (Cutlerite) and the Reorganized Church of Jesus Christ of Latter Day Saints (today the Community of Christ). Several others moved to California. One of his sons joined the Mormon Battalion and went on to help establish Mormon settlements in Utah, Nevada, and Arizona.

=== King Follett discourse ===
Follett's legacy largely lies with his association with the King Follett discourse. The discourse was delivered on April 7, 1844 by Joseph Smith as a commemorative sermon for Follett. Follett's family and friends had requested that Smith speak in his memory. In it, he introduced new theological teachings including the claim that God was once a mortal man, and that mortal men and women can become gods (a concept commonly called divinization) through salvation and exaltation. The discourse is often seen by Mormons as Smith's greatest sermon.

The King Follett discourse is the main source of Follett's notability, and some have written that he would be virtually unknown to history without the famous sermon. However, Follett was also a fairly prominent member of the early Mormon community in his own right. In addition, while most deaths in Nauvoo at the time received 1–3 lines in the newspaper, Follett had two lengthy obituaries published in the Nauvoo Neighbor. Follett was also known for being the last Mormon prisoner released in Missouri, and for his friendship with Joseph Smith, but these distinctions are less prominent than his association with the famous discourse.
