= David Dollahite =

American family life professor

David Dollahite (born December 17, 1958) is a professor of family life at Brigham Young University (BYU) who specializes in the effects of religion on marriage, family life, and youth. He is a co-leader (with Dr. Loren Marks) of the American Families of Faith project. He is a family life coach who focuses on helping men become better husbands and fathers and helping couples strengthen their marriage.

== Personal life ==
Dollahite was born in Greenbrae, California. Dollahite joined the Church of Jesus Christ of Latter-day Saints (LDS Church) at age 19. He served as a missionary for the LDS Church in Boston, Massachusetts. Dollahite married Mary Kimball in 1983 and they are the parents of seven children and grandparents of three. Among many other positions in the LDS Church, Dollahite has served as the bishop of a BYU Ward.

Dollahite has written two hymns with music by S. Gordon Jessop. "May Thy Face of Shining Splendor" received an Award of Distinction in the 2008 LDS Church music competition while "As Families in the Latter Days" received an Award of Merit in the 2006 LDS Church music competition. Both were performed at the LDS Music Festival in the Salt Lake Assembly Hall on Temple Square.

== Education and Work Experience ==
Dollahite received his bachelor's and master's degrees from BYU and his Ph.D. from the University of Minnesota. He was a professor at the University of North Carolina at Greensboro from 1989 to 1993 and has been a member of the BYU faculty since 1993. He has been a visiting scholar at the Religion Program of Dominican University of California, at the Center for the Family at the University of Massachusetts Amherst, and at the Center on Adolescence at Stanford University.

== Works ==
Dollahite co-authored the book Religion and Families: An Introduction with Loren D. Marks (Routledge, 2017).

Dollahite edited the book Generative Fathering: Beyond Deficit Perspectives with Alan J. Hawkins. Dollahite also edited Strengthening Our Families: A In-Depth Look at the Proclamation on the Family (Bookcraft, 2000), "Helping and Healing Our Families" (with Craig Hart, Lloyd Newell, and Elaine Walton, Deseret Book, 2005), "Successful Marriages and Families" (with Alan Hawkins and Thomas Draper, BYU Studies, 2012), "Turning Hearts: Short Stories on Family Life" (with Orson Scott Card, Bookcraft, 1998), and Strengths in Diverse Families of Faith: Exploring Religious Differences (with Loren D. Marks, Routledge, 2020).

Among the articles Dollahite has authored or co-authored are "Fathering, Faith and Spirituality" in Journal of Men's Studies, Vol. 7, no. 1; "Faithful Fathering In Trying Times: Religious Beliefs and Practices of Latter-day Saint Fathers with Special Needs Children" same issue of Journal of Men's Studies; "Fathering, Faith and Family Therapy" in Journal of Family Psychotherapy, 2002.
