= Let all mortal flesh keep silence =

Early Christian hymn text

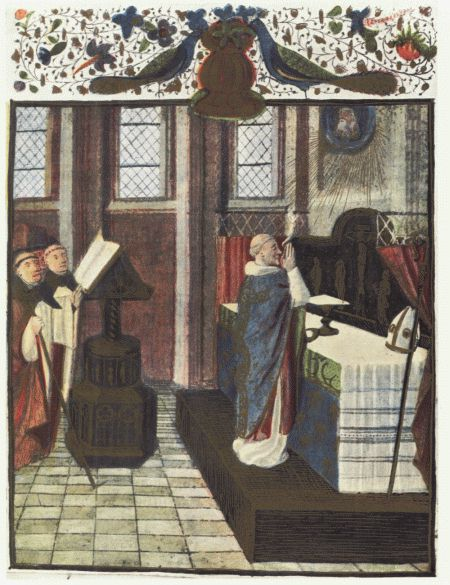
- Prayers during the Canon of the Mass during the Mass of the Faithful.
- English: Let all mortal flesh keep silence
- Native name: Ancient Greek: Σιγησάτω πᾶσα σάρξ βροτεία
- Genre: Hymn
- Based on: Habakkuk 2:20 and Zechariah 2:13
- Meter: 8.7.8.7.8.7
- Melody: "Picardy"

Let all mortal flesh keep silence (Ancient Greek: Σιγησάτω πᾶσα σάρξ βροτεία), also known as Let all mortal flesh keep silent, is an ancient chant of Eucharistic devotion based on words from Habakkuk 2:20, "Let all the earth keep silence before him" (Hebrew: הַ֥ס מִפָּנָ֖יו כָּל־הָאָֽרֶץ has mippanaw kol ha-arets, Septuagint: ὁ δὲ κύριος ἐν ναῷ ἁγίῳ αὐτοῦ εὐλαβείσθω ἀπὸ προσώπου αὐτοῦ πᾶσα ἡ γῆ) and Zechariah 2:13, "Be silent, all flesh, before the LORD; for he has roused himself from his holy dwelling" (Hebrew: הַ֥ס כָּל־בָּשָׂ֖ר מִפְּנֵ֣י יְהוָ֑ה כִּ֥י נֵעֹ֖ור מִמְּעֹ֥ון קָדְשֹֽׁו׃ ס. Septuagint: εὐλαβείσθω πᾶσα σὰρξ ἀπὸ προσώπου κυρίου διότι ἐξεγήγερται ἐκ νεφελῶν ἁγίων αὐτοῦ). The original was composed in Greek as a Cherubic Hymn for the Offertory of the Divine Liturgy of St James; it probably antedates the rest of the liturgy and goes back at least to AD 275, with local churches adopting arrangements in Syriac. In modern times, the Ralph Vaughan Williams arrangement of a translation from the Greek by Gerard Moultrie to the tune of "Picardy", a French medieval folk melody, popularized the hymn among other Christian congregations.

== Origin and usage in Eastern Christian traditions ==
The ancient hymn is contained within the Ancient Georgian Iadgari (Chantbook) of Jerusalem, demonstrating its liturgical use for some time prior to the middle of the 6th century.

Borrowed from the old Divine Liturgy of St. James, it replaces the Cherubikon in the Divine Liturgy of St. Basil the Great in the Eucharist celebrated as part of vespers of Holy Saturday. The Byzantine Rite only makes use of the Divine Liturgy of St. Basil ten times a year, and during most of the liturgical year the Divine Liturgy of St. John Chrysostom is used instead. However, even in the dates when the Divine Liturgy of St. Basil is used, the normal Cherubikon is usually sung. It is however replaced by the anthem Let all mortal flesh keep silent specifically on Holy Saturday; on Holy Thursday it is replaced with the prayer 'Of Thy mystical supper'.

However, Churches that use the Divine Liturgy of St. James as their principal Liturgy or as a Liturgy in frequent use, such as the Syriac Orthodox Church, the Syriac Catholic Church, the Syro-Malankara Catholic Church and the Maronite Church sing the hymn Let all mortal flesh keep silent regularly, whenever the Divine Liturgy of St. James is used, since the anthem Let all mortal flesh keep silent is the standard Cherubic Hymn of that Liturgy.

== Usage in the Western Orthodox tradition ==
When the Russian Orthodox priest Eugraph Kovalevsky (later Saint John of Saint-Denis) set about reconstructing a form of the Gallican Rite mass for use by the Western Orthodox Christians of France in the middle of the 20th century, the manuscripts to which he had access did not provide any clue to the text of the Sonus and Laudes, which were the two chants anciently sung during the offertory procession of the bread and wine to the altar. The ancient hymn Let all mortal flesh keep silent was deemed to be a fitting substitute, both because of its ancient precedent in an identical position in the Divine Liturgy of St. James and also because its theme was in keeping with the repeated emphasis on silence in the Gallican liturgical tradition. Today, this hymn continues to be used as a standard part of the Divine Liturgy of St Germanus in various Orthodox churches, only being replaced by other hymns during certain feasts and seasons.

== Text ==
=== Greek text used in the Byzantine Divine Liturgy (Orthodox or Eastern Rite Catholic) ===
Ancient Greek: Σιγησάτω πᾶσα σάρξ βροτεία, καὶ στήτω μετὰ φόβου καὶ τρόμου, καὶ μηδὲν γήϊνον ἐν ἑαυτῇ λογιζέσθω· ὁ γὰρ Βασιλεῦς τῶν βασιλευόντων, καὶ Κύριος τῶν κυριευόντων, προσέρχεται σφαγιασθῆναι, καὶ δοθῆναι εἰς βρῶσιν τοῖς πιστοῖς· προηγοῦνται δὲ τούτου, οἱ χοροὶ τῶν Ἀγγέλων, μετὰ πάσης ἀρχῆς καὶ ἐξουσίας, τὰ πολυόμματα Χερουβίμ, καὶ τὰ ἑξαπτέρυγα Σεραφίμ, τὰς ὄψεις καλύπτοντα, καὶ βοῶντα τὸν ὕμνον· Ἀλληλούϊα, Ἀλληλούϊα, Ἀλληλούϊα. (Note: In the Greek typica, or in relevant historical texts and manuscripts, textual variations in the wording of this hymn are attested; e.g. λογιζέτω for λογιζέσθω, "additional" καί, etc.)

=== English translation of the Greek text used in the Byzantine Liturgy ===
Let all mortal flesh keep silent, and stand with fear and trembling, and in itself consider nothing earthly; for the King of kings and Lord of lords cometh forth to be sacrificed, and given as food to the believers; and there go before Him the choirs of Angels, with every Dominion and Power, the many-eyed Cherubim and the six-winged Seraphim, covering their faces, and crying out the hymn: Alleluia, Alleluia, Alleluia.

=== Slavonic translation of the Greek text, used in the Russian Orthodox Liturgy and in certain Eastern Catholic Rites – tone 8 ===
Да молчи́т вся́кая плоть челове́ча, и да стоя́т со стра́хом и тре́петом, и ничто́же земно́е в себе́ да помышля́ет: Царь бо ца́рствующих, и Госпо́дь госпо́дствующих, прихо́дит закла́тися и да́тися в снедь ве́рным. Предхо́дят же Сему́ ли́цы а́нгельстии со вся́ким Нача́лом и Вла́стию, многоочи́тии Херуви́ми и шестокрила́тии Серафими, ли́ца закрыва́юще, и вопию́ще песнь: Аллилу́иа, аллилу́иа, аллилу́иа.

=== Latin text used in Western Orthodox rites and in the Mediaeval Missa Graeca ===
Sileat omnis caro mortalis et stet cum timore et tremore neve quidquam terrestre in se meditetur. Rex enim regnantium, Christus Deus noster, prodit ut mactetur deturque in escam fidelibus, praecedunt autem hunc chori angelorum cum omni principatu et potestate, cherubim multis oculis et seraphim sex alis praedita, facies velantia et vociferantia hymnum, alleluia.

=== English poem by Gerard Moultrie used in the Anglican Communion, the Roman Catholic Church, Western Rite Orthodoxy, Lutheran, Presbyterian, and Reformed Churches ===
Let all mortal flesh keep silence,
And with fear and trembling stand;
Ponder nothing earthly-minded,
For with blessing in His hand,
Christ our God to earth descendeth,
Our full homage to demand.

King of kings, yet born of Mary,
As of old on earth He stood,
Lord of lords, in human vesture,
In the body and the blood;
He will give to all the faithful
His own self for heav'nly food.

Rank on rank the host of heaven
Spreads its vanguard on the way,
As the Light of light descendeth
From the realms of endless day,
That the pow'rs of hell may vanish
As the darkness clears away.

At His feet the six-winged seraph,
Cherubim with sleepless eye,
Veil their faces to the presence,
As with ceaseless voice they cry:
"Alleluia, Alleluia
Alleluia, Lord Most High!"

== Musical settings ==
Edward Bairstow composed his setting for SATB choir in 1906, but it wasn't published (by Stainer & Bell) until 1925. According to Philip Moore:

The music captures the words perfectly with the sombre opening in octaves, followed by high voices lifting the mind 'above all earthly thought'. The use of octaves increases a sense of mystery and awe. There is a massive build-up through the 'choirs of angels' to the Alleluias, and the music eventually subsides with a magical harmonized version of the opening, complete with a cadence of unusual power.

== See also ==
- Divine Liturgy of St James, from which this hymn is derived.
- Gerard Moultrie, author of the English lyrics of the hymn.
- Picardy (hymn), the tune used for the English hymn.
- Eucharistic adoration

== Notes and references ==
Notes
