= Alan J. Hawkins (academic) =

Alan J. Hawkins (born July 8, 1955) is a professor in the Brigham Young University (BYU) School of Family Life, a division of the university's College of Home Family and Social Sciences. He is the Camilla E. Kimball professor of family life at BYU.

Hawkins was one of the witnesses brought by the state of Iowa to argue in court against same-sex marriage.

Hawkins has done extensive research and written many publications on the role of fathers in child development, as well as on the role of pre-marital counseling and classes and other laws to reduce divorce rates. Hawkins currently serves as the chair of the Utah Commission on Marriage and as a member of the advisory board of the National Center for African American Marriages and Families at Hampton University.

== Personal life ==
Hawkins graduated from Ann Arbor Huron High School in Ann Arbor, Michigan. He served a mission for the Church of Jesus Christ of Latter-day Saints in Kobe, Japan, from 1974 to 1976.

Hawkins married Lisa Bolin in 1977 and they are the parents of two children and have two grandchildren.

== Education and career ==
Hawkins holds a bachelor's in psychology (1979) and master's degree in organizational behavior (1984) from BYU and a doctorate in human developments and family studies (1990) from Pennsylvania State University. He has been a member of the BYU faculty since 1990. In 2000 he was a visiting scholar with the National Fatherhood Initiative and from 2003-2004 he was a visiting scholar at the Office of Planning, Research and Evaluation of the Administration for Children and Families, a part of the United States Department of Health and Human Services. Hawkins was also one of the developers of the Marriage Moments program. The plan for marriage education, with Hawkins as the lead author, was used by the Roman Catholic Diocese of Trenton to run a federal government funded program to encourage marriage among African-American and Hispanic couples who were currently cohabiting. Hawkins also co-founded with David Dollahite the website FatherWork.

Hawkins focus in research has been on the importance of fathers and more recently on government educational initiatives to help couples form and sustain healthy marriages and relationships. He has also made statements questioning the wisdom of same-sex marriage, which have been quoted in articles by such commentators on the issue as Stanley Kurtz.

Hawkins statements on issues such as covenant marriage have been quoted in papers throughout the United States, such as the Los Angeles Times on February 11, 2001. His studies showing marriage makes a difference to men's lives were cited in a Honolulu Star-Bulletin article.

Hawkins testimony for the state of Iowa (opposing same-sex marriage) in the case of Varnum v. Brien.

== Publications ==
Hawkins recently wrote a 168-page guidebook for individuals at the crossroads of divorce with Tamara Fackrell. A free electronic copy can be obtained here The guidebook is designed to help individuals considering divorce, helping them think clearly about the decision, and providing research on important issues related to divorce and reconciliation. He edited with Lynn D. Wardle and David Orgon Coolidge Revitalizing the Institution of Marriage for the Twenty-First Century: An Agenda for Strengthening the Family (Westport, Connecticut: Praeger, 2002). He also edited with Jay Fagan the book Clinical and Educational Interventions with Fathers. He also co-edited with David Dollahite the book Generative Fathering: Beyond Deficit Perspectives. Hawkins was also one of eight principal authors of Twogether in Texas: Baseline Report for Marriage in the Lone-Star State.

Hawkins has written several articles. Among these are "Perspectives on Covenant Marriage" in The Family in America November 1998, Vol. 12, No. 11, pp. 1–8.; "Maternal Gatekeeping: Mothers Beliefs and behaviors that inhibit greater father involvement" (with Sarah M. Allen) in Journal of Marriage and Family, Vol. 61, no. 1; "Are Fathers Fungible" (with D. J. Eggebeen) in Journal of Marriage and Family, Vol. 53, no. 4, p. 958-972; "Exploring Wives Sense of Fairness About Family" (with several others, but he was lead author) Journal of Family Issues, Vol. 16, no. 6; "The Role of Father Involvement in Personality Change in Men Across the Transition to Parenthood" (with Jay Belsky) in Family Relations, Vol. 38, no. 4, p. 378-384.

== Sources ==
- Deseret News, August 15, 2009
- National Healthy Marriage Resource Center blurb about Hawkins most recent book
- National Healthy Marriage Resource Center piece with short bio of Hawkins who was one of the authors
- Marriage.About.com press release explaining the new findings of Hawkins "Maternal Gatekeepers" article
- Hawkins' Vita
- Greenwood Press bio
- Sage Books article on one of Hawkins books
- listing of quotes from Hawkins
