= John Moultrie (poet) =

English clergyman, poet, and hymn-writer (1799–1874)

- Born: 31 December 1799; London, England
- Died: 26 December 1874 (aged 74); Rugby, Warwickshire, England
- Education: Trinity College, Cambridge
- Children: 8, including Gerard Moultrie
- Relatives: John Moultrie (grandfather)

John Moultrie (1799–1874) was an English clergyman, known as a poet and hymn-writer.

== Early life and education ==
He was born in Great Portland Street, London, on 31 December 1799, at the house of his maternal grandmother, Mrs Fendall; he was the eldest son of George Moultrie, rector of Cleobury Mortimer, Shropshire, by his wife Harriet (died 1867). His father was the son of John Moultrie of South Carolina.

After preliminary education at Ramsbury, Wiltshire, Moultrie was sent to Eton College in 1811. John Keate, whom he annoyed by a visit to Thomas Gray's monument at Stoke Poges, was then headmaster. Among his friends were William Sidney Walker, Lord Morpeth, Richard Okes, John Louis Petit, Henry Nelson Coleridge and Edward Coleridge, and Winthrop Mackworth Praed. He composed with great facility in Latin, but was indifferent to school studies, distinguishing himself as a cricketer, actor, and wit.

In October 1819 Moultrie entered, as a commoner, Trinity College, Cambridge, where he became intimate with Thomas Babington Macaulay, Charles Austin, and others of their set. He played for Cambridge University Cricket Club, and is recorded in one match in 1820, totalling 6 runs with a highest score of 6 not out and taking 1 wicket. Proceeding his M.A. in 1822, he spent time at the Middle Temple, but after acting for some time as a tutor to the three sons of Lord Craven, he gave up the law and decided to take holy orders; he had an offer of the living of Rugby, Warwickshire, by Lord Craven in 1825. In 1825 he was also ordained, and on 28 July that year he married Harriet Margaret Fergusson, sister of James Fergusson.

== Career ==
He had the parsonage at Rugby rebuilt, and went to reside there in 1828. Moultrie arrived in the parish almost simultaneously with Thomas Arnold's acceptance of the headmastership of Rugby School. Writing to Derwent Coleridge, Moultrie's close friend Bonamy Price described the reciprocal influence of these two men.

At school he wrote for the College Magazine, edited the subsequent Horæ Otiosæ, and after leaving Eton contributed verses to the Etonian during 1820–1. His treatment of the subject of Lady Godiva was praised by William Gifford and William Wordsworth. Both in the Etonian and in Charles Knight's Quarterly Magazine his verses appeared under the pseudonym 'Gerard Montgomery.'

In 1837 Moultrie issued a collection of his poems, which were favourably reviewed both in the Quarterly Review and the Edinburgh Review In 1843 he published 'The Dream of Life; Lays of the English Church and other Poems.' It is an autobiographical meditation in verse, which contains comments on contemporaries, including Thomas Babington Macaulay, Henry Nelson Coleridge, Charles Austin, Chauncey Hare Townshend, and Charles Taylor. In 1850 appeared 'The Black Fence, a Lay of Modern Rome,' an anti-papal work, and 'St. Mary, the Virgin and Wife,' both of which had several editions. In 1852 he edited the Poetical Remains of William Sidney Walker.

In 1854, his last volume of verse appeared, 'Altars, Hearths, and Graves.' Among its contents is the 'Three Minstrels,' giving an account of Moultrie's meetings, on different occasions, with Wordsworth, Coleridge and Tennyson. In his later work Moultrie became the writer of much blank verse of a conscientious and explanatory type. He also wrote a number of hymns, on special subjects. Most of them are in Benjamin Hall Kennedy's Hymnologia Christiana, 1863.

A complete edition of his poems was published in two volumes in 1876, with a memoir, by Derwent Coleridge.

== Personal life ==
He died on 26 December 1874 in Rugby, Warwickshire of smallpox, which he had caught from a parishioner whom he was visiting. He was buried in the parish church, to which an aisle was added in his memory. His gravestone says "The good shepherd lays down his life for his sheep". Moultrie Road in central Rugby is named after him.

His wife Harriet died in 1864, leaving three sons and four daughters. Of them, Gerard Moultrie and Mary Moultrie were also hymn-writers.

He was the great-uncle of Henry Stephens Salt, a vegetarian socialist and animal rights advocate.
