= Liturgy of Saint James =

Eastern Christian liturgy

The Liturgy of Saint James is a form of Christian liturgy used by some Eastern Christians of the Byzantine rite and West Syriac Rite. It is developed from an ancient Egyptian form of the Basilean anaphoric family, and is influenced by the traditions of the rite of the Church of Jerusalem, as the Mystagogic Catecheses of Cyril of Jerusalem imply. It became the primary Divine Liturgy in the Church of Antioch and Church of Jerusalem in the early fifth century, soon becoming supplanted by the liturgies of Saint Basil and Saint John Chrysostom. It is still the principal liturgy of the Syriac Orthodox Church, the Malankara Orthodox Syrian Church, the Maronite Church, the Syriac Catholic Church, the Malankara Jacobite Syrian Church, the Syro-Malankara Catholic Church and other churches employing the West Syriac Rite. It is also occasionally used in the Eastern Orthodox Church and Melkite Catholic Church. The Malankara Mar Thoma Syrian Church uses a reformed variant of this liturgy, omitting intercession of saints and prayer for the dead.

The liturgy is attributed with the name of James the Just (a.k.a., James the Brother of the Lord) and patriarch among the Jewish Christians at Jerusalem and not James the Greater or James the Less.

The historic Antiochene liturgies are divided between Alexandrian and Cappadocian usages. Among these, the Liturgy of Saint James is one of the liturgies that evolved from the Alexandrian usage; others include Coptic Anaphora of Saint Basil, the Byzantine Liturgy of Saint Basil and the Liturgy of Saint John Chrysostom. The liturgies attributed to Saint John Chrysostom and Saint Basil are the ones most widely used today by all Byzantine Rite Christians, including the Eastern Orthodox, some Eastern Catholic Churches, and Byzantine Rite Lutherans.

== Manuscript tradition ==
Its date of composition is still disputed, but most authorities propose a late fourth-century date for the known form, because the anaphora seems to have been developed from an early Egyptian form of the Liturgy of Saint Basil influenced by the anaphora described in the Mystagogical Catechesis attributed to St. Cyril of Jerusalem. The earliest manuscript is the ninth-century codex, Vaticanus graecus 2282, which had been in liturgical use at Damascus, in the diocese of Antioch. Dom B.-Charles Mercier published the only critical edition in the Patrologia Orientalis, vol. 26 (1950).

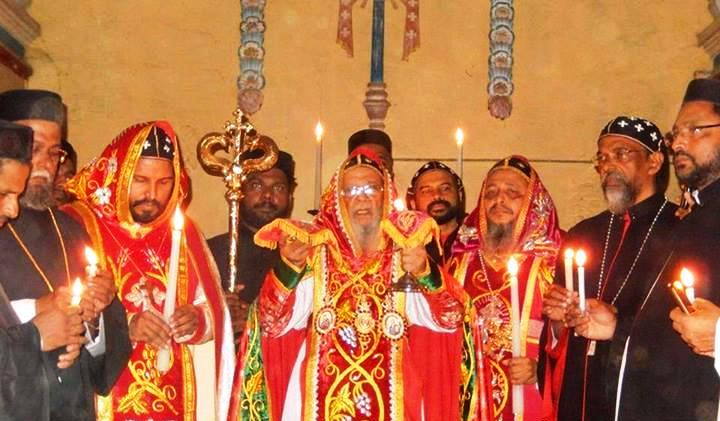
A West Syriac Rite liturgy of the Jacobite Syrian Christian Church holding paterissa (crozier)

=== Order of liturgy ===
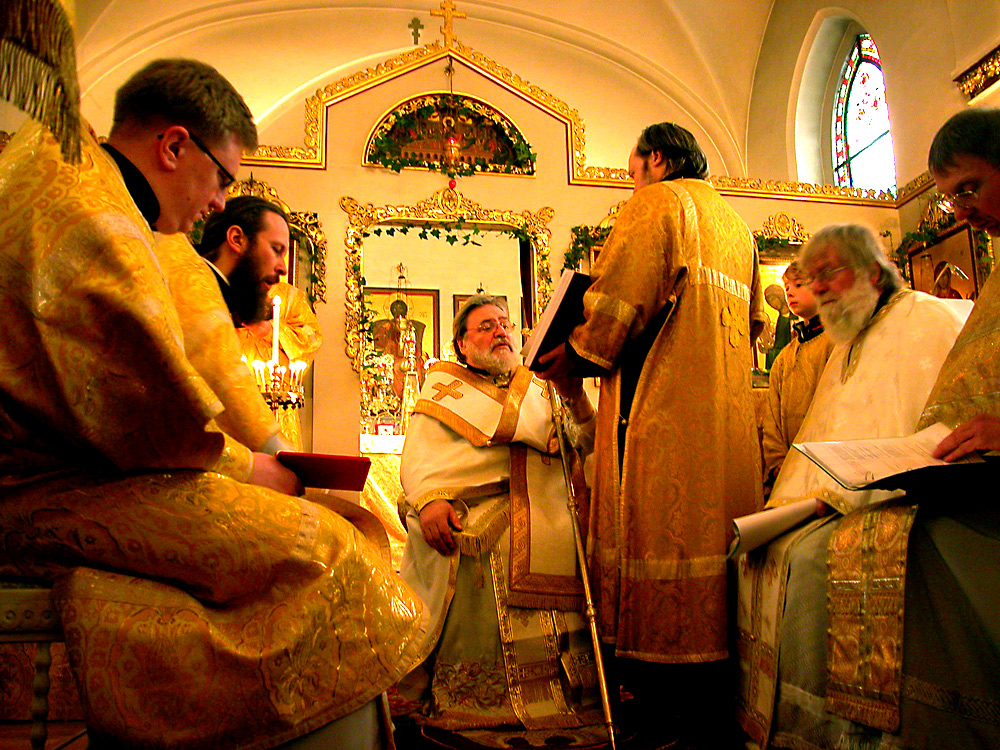
Eastern Orthodox bishop Longin (Talypin), holding his paterissa (crozier), presiding over a celebration of the Liturgy of St. James in Düsseldorf, Germany

The Liturgy of Saint James the Just is the skeleton of the whole Qurbono Qadisho with all the prayers before the anaphora being exactly the same, no matter which anaphora is chosen. The Liturgy of St James the Just comprises:

1. The First Service
  1. Prothesis
2. The Second Service
  1. Reading from the Holy Books
    1. The Trisagion
    2. Antiphon before the Pauline Epistle (Galatians 1:8–9)
    3. The Epistle of Saint Paul
3. The Third Service
  1. The Husoyo (Liturgy of Absolution)
    1. The Proemion
    2. The Sedro (Main Prayer)
    3. The Etro (Fragrance/incense prayer)
4. The Anaphora
  1. The Kiss of peace
  2. Veiling and placing of the hands prayer
  3. The Dialogue
  4. Preface
  5. Sanctus (Qadish)
  6. Words of Institution
  7. Anamnesis
  8. Epiclesis
  9. Petitions
  10. Fracturing
  11. Liturgy of Repentance
    1. Lord's Prayer (Abun dbashmayo)
  12. Invitation to Holy Communion
  13. The Procession of the Holy Mysteries
  14. Prayer of Thanksgiving
  15. The Dismissal of the Faithful

In the books of the Patriarchal Sharfet seminary, this order is clearly strict, with the deacon and congregation prayer being the same no matter which anaphora is used. The only prayer that changes when a different anaphora is used is that of the priest.

=== Rubrics ===
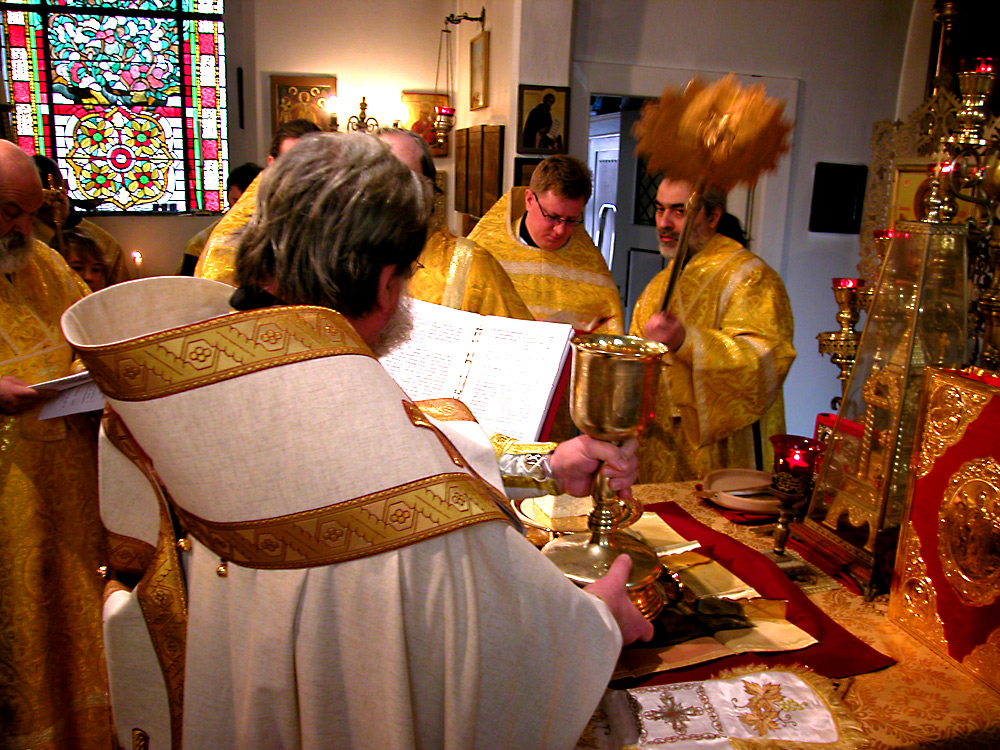
The bishop elevates the chalice while the deacon fans the Gifts with the ripidion.

The Liturgy of St. James is commonly celebrated, in Western liturgical traditions, on the Feast of Saint James the Great (July 25) or, more properly in the Orthodox tradition on October 23, the feast of Saint James, the Brother of the Lord, as well as the first Sunday after Christmas, and then almost exclusively celebrated on a daily basis in Jerusalem, in the Eastern Orthodox Church. The Liturgy of Saint James is long, taking some hours to complete in full. The recitation of the Divine Liturgy is performed according to the worship rubrics of a particular Rite, with specific parts chanted by the presider, the lectors, the choir, and the congregated faithful, at certain times in unison. Like other compositions in the Byzantine tradition, the Divine Liturgy of St. James as celebrated in Greek and vernacular forms the basis of the English transcription. In its Syriac form, the Liturgy is still used in the Syriac and Indian Churches—Catholic and Orthodox—both in a Syriac translation and in Malayalam and English.

As with other Eastern liturgies, this one calls for a Cherubic Hymn to be chanted during the Offertory as the priest brings the gifts to be consecrated onto the altar. In the Latin Catholic Church, this composition became popular as a separate hymn of adoration of the Blessed Sacrament, known in English as Let All Mortal Flesh Keep Silence.

== Musical annotation ==
The hymnographers of the early Church composed both the words of the sung prayers and the tones of the musical scale to be sung in a single codex for a particular community. The annotation was recorded in close correspondence to the text (for sample codices, see those collated by the North American Greek Orthodox Monastery of St. Anthony in Arizona) with neumes indicating the melodic tones and their duration used before the adoption of the Western system of staff and scales became established in medieval times. In those communities that worship in Syriac the neumes are mirror images of those used by the authocthonous Greek and Slavic Orthodox Churches and written and read right to left in accordance with the Syriac script of the prayer texts.

The English Hymnal features the 1906 Ralph Vaughan Williams arrangement of the English verses of the Cherubic hymn of the Offertory chant (see above) to the melody of the French folk tune Picardy. The hymn known as Let All Mortal Flesh Keep Silence is also popular in the Roman Catholic Latin rite as an alternative to the spoken communion antiphon.

== See also ==
- Anaphora (liturgy)
