= David L. Paulsen =

American philosopher (1936–2020)

David Lamont Paulsen (1936–2020) was a professor emeritus of philosophy at Brigham Young University (BYU). From 1994 to 1998 he held the Richard L. Evans Chair of Religious Understanding at BYU. He was an active faculty member at BYU from 1972–2011.

== Biography ==
Paulsen was born on November 13, 1936, in Ephraim, Utah. His parents were educators, and he followed them in their careers.

He received an associate degree from Snow College in English in 1957, a bachelor's degree from BYU in political science in 1961 (in which he was BYU's valedictorian), a JD from the University of Chicago Law School in 1964, and a Ph.D. in philosophy from the University of Michigan in 1975, with emphasis in the philosophy of religion. His doctoral dissertation, entitled "The Comparative Coherency of Mormon (Finitistic) and Classical Theism", was said by Francis J. Beckwith and Stephen E. Parish, two philosophers critical of LDS theology, to be "by far the most detailed and comprehensive defense of Mormon theism."

He married Audrey Lucille Leer and had six children.

Paulsen died November 30, 2020.

=== Career ===
Paulsen joined the philosophy department at BYU around 1972 and specialized in Kierkegaard, William James, and the philosophy of religion. In addition to holding the Richard L. Evans Chair, he was also an Eliza R. Snow Fellow. Many of his students went on to become important figures in the academic study of Mormonism, including Blake Ostler.

Paulsen was a member of the Church of Jesus Christ of Latter-day Saints (LDS Church), in which he served as a bishop and counselor for a stake presidency.

Paulsen gave lectures related to Mormon studies, including the 2006 Eugene England Memorial Lecture at Utah Valley University, as well as presentations at conferences of the Foundation for Apologetic Information and Research (FAIR). He presented on "the Divine Feminine" at the 2009 BYU Women's Research Institute Colloquia. Paulsen was also the coordinator for the Society of Christian Philosophers' inaugural inter-mountain meeting at BYU in 1992.

In 2012, just after his retirement, a collection of essays entitled Mormonism at the Crossroads of Philosophy and Theology: Essays in Honor of David L. Paulsen was published, having been edited by Jacob T. Baker.

== Writings ==
Paulsen edited Mormonism in Dialogue with Contemporary Christian Theologies along with Donald W. Musser. Paulsen contributed articles to The International Journal for the Philosophy of Religion, Analysis, Harvard Theological Review, Faith and Philosophy and Speculative Philosophy. Paulsen also wrote the foreword to The Mormon Doctrine of Deity: The Roberts-Van Der Donckt Discussion Paulsen has also written several articles for both the FARMS Review and BYU Studies. One of these articles, written with Martin Pulido, who studied under Paulsen, entitled "A Mother There: Historical Teachings and Sacred Silence" (BYU Studies Vol. 5, no. 1) has been described as a path-breaking article on femininity in LDS doctrine by Valerie M. Hudson.

Paulsen's work was used in Jeffrey R. Holland's General Conference sermon explaining that the Mormon belief that Jesus and God have physical bodies does not exclude Mormons from being Christians.

== Sources ==
- David L. Paulsen at the MLCA Database
- Paulsen's vita
- Meridian Magazine listing of speakers at an upcoming FAIR conference
- Author bio from FARMS
- BYU Studies listing of articles by Paulsen
- Mormon Scholars Testify entry on Paulsen
