= Prison (disambiguation) =

A prison is a place of incarceration, where convicted criminals are punished for their crimes, and where counseling, retraining and work opportunities are provided in order to correct or rehabilitate their criminal behaviors.

A prison is not a jail or a detention facility (generally where people who have not been convicted of any crime are "detained").

Prison(s) or The Prison(s) may also refer to:

== Film and television ==
- Prison (1949 film), a Swedish film by Ingmar Bergman
- Prison (1987 film), an American film directed by Renny Harlin
- The Prison (2017 film), a South Korean film
- Prison: First & Last 24 Hours, a 2015–2016 British television documentary series
- Prisons (film), a 2024 Finnish action film directed by Esa Jussila
- "The Prison", an episode of Armchair Cinema

== Music ==
- The Prison: A Book with a Soundtrack, an album by Michael Nesmith, 1974
- Prisons (album), by Eyes of Fire, 2006
- "Prison" (Natalia Gordienko song), 2020
- "Prison", a song by Tom Robinson, 1985
- The Prison, a 1929–30 cantata composed by Ethel Smyth

== Other uses ==
- The Prison (novel), a 1968 novel by Georges Simenon
- Qaid Khana (transl. The Prison), a 1942 short story collection by Ahmed Ali
- Prisons F.C., a Tanzanian football club
- Imaginary Prisons, or simply Prisons, a series of 18th-century prints by Giovanni Battista Piranesi

== See also ==
- En prison, a roulette term
- False imprisonment, a crime in common law
- Prison Oval, a Jamaican stadium
- Prison rock, pessimistic genre of Chinese rock music
- Prison Song (disambiguation)
- Spirit prison, in Latter-day Saints beliefs, a place in the spirit world
- Spirits in prison, one of the Christian concepts about the afterlife
