= Islam and Mormonism =

Overview of the relationship and comparison of Mormonism and Islam

Islam and Mormonism have been compared to one another since the earliest origins of the latter in the nineteenth century, sometimes by detractors of one or both religions, but also at least once by Joseph Smith, founder of the Latter Day Saint movement, himself. Smith was also frequently referred to as "the Modern Muhammad" by several publications of the era, notably in the New York Herald, shortly after his assassination in June 1844. This epithet repeated a comparison that had been made from Smith's earliest career.

Comparison of the Mormon and Muslim prophets still occurs today, sometimes for derogatory or polemical reasons but also for more scholarly and neutral purposes. Although Mormonism and Islam bear some similarities in history, there are mainly significant differences between the two religions. Mormon–Muslim relations have historically been cordial; recent years have seen increasing dialogue between adherents of the two faiths, and cooperation in charitable endeavors.

Mormons have also been compared to Ahmadi Muslims specifically, with many noting distinct similarities in both groups' doctrine, history, culture, approach to missionary work, and general lack of acceptance from mainstream Christianity and Islam, respectively.

== Overview ==
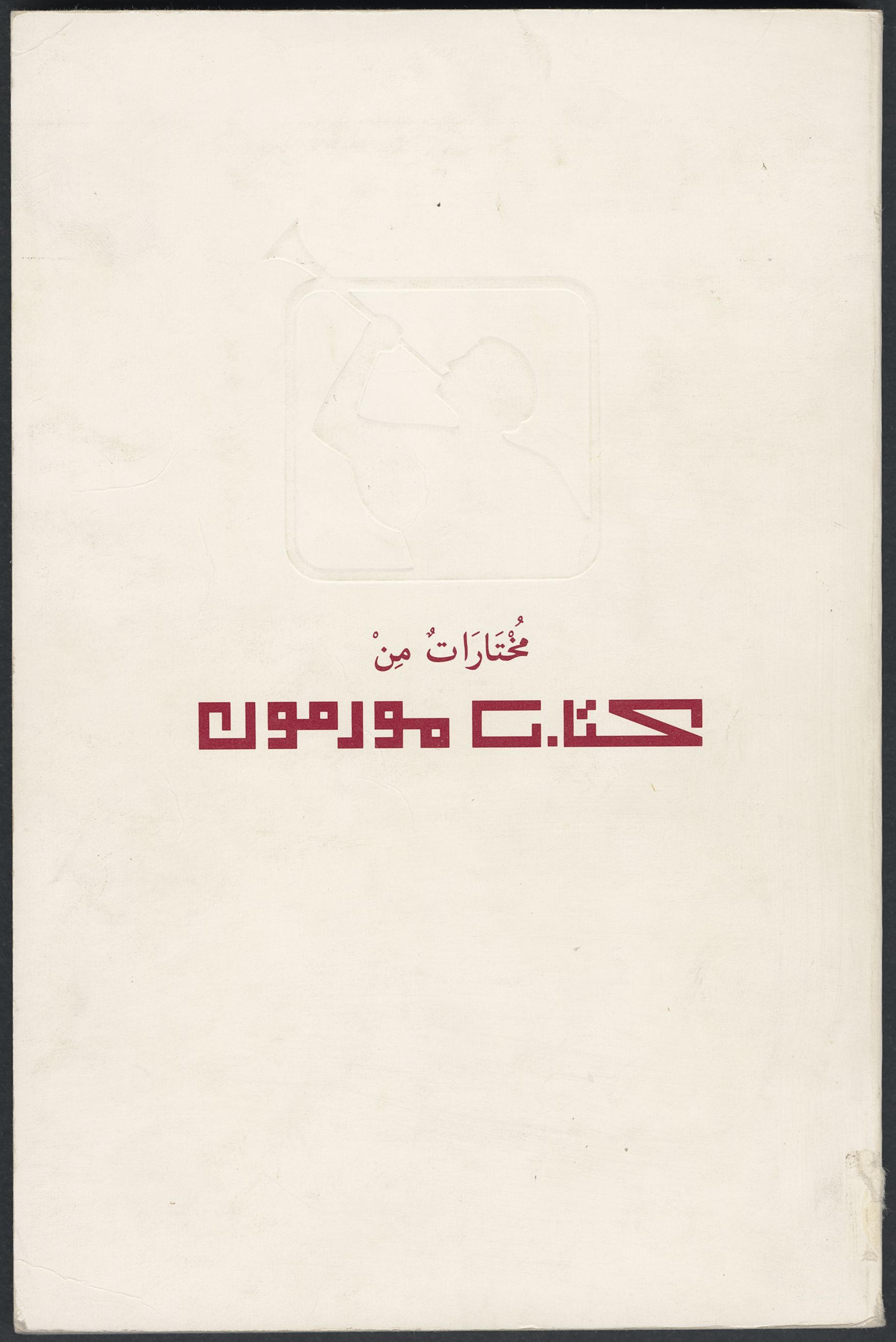
The Book of Mormon in Arabic.

Islam and Latter-day Saint theology both originate in the Abrahamic tradition; LDS theology differs from Mainstream Christianity for having diverging views on Trinitarianism. However, whereas Islam insists upon the Eternity, complete Oneness and Uniqueness of God (Allah), LDS Christianity asserts that the Godhead is made up of three distinct "beings", Heavenly Father, Jesus Christ, and the Holy Ghost so united with one purpose as to be indistingushable. Furthermore, its doctrine of Eternal Progression asserts that God was once a man, and that humans may become gods themselves, both of which are considered kufr in Islam.

Both Islam and Latter-day Saints believe that the Christian religion as originally established by Jesus was a true religion, but that Christianity subsequently became deformed to the point that it was beyond simple reformation. Hence, each religion sees its founder (Muhammad for Islam, and Joseph Smith for the LDS Church) as being a succeeding prophet of God, called to re-establish the true faith. However, each religion differs in regard to how it views Jesus: Latter-day Saints see him as the promised Messiah and the Son of God (as is the case around mainstream Christianity). Islam agrees that Jesus (whom the Quran calls "Isa") was a Messiah in his own right, but insists that he was only a mortal man, not the Son of God or a divine being. Despite great opposition from many other Christian branches, Latter-day Saints identify themselves as a Christian religion, and the "restoration" of primitive Christianity. Islam does not refer to itself as "Christian"; it asserts that Jesus and all true followers of Christ's teachings were originally Muslims – a term that means "submitters to God" – in their belief, not Christians as that term is used today.

== Similar origins ==
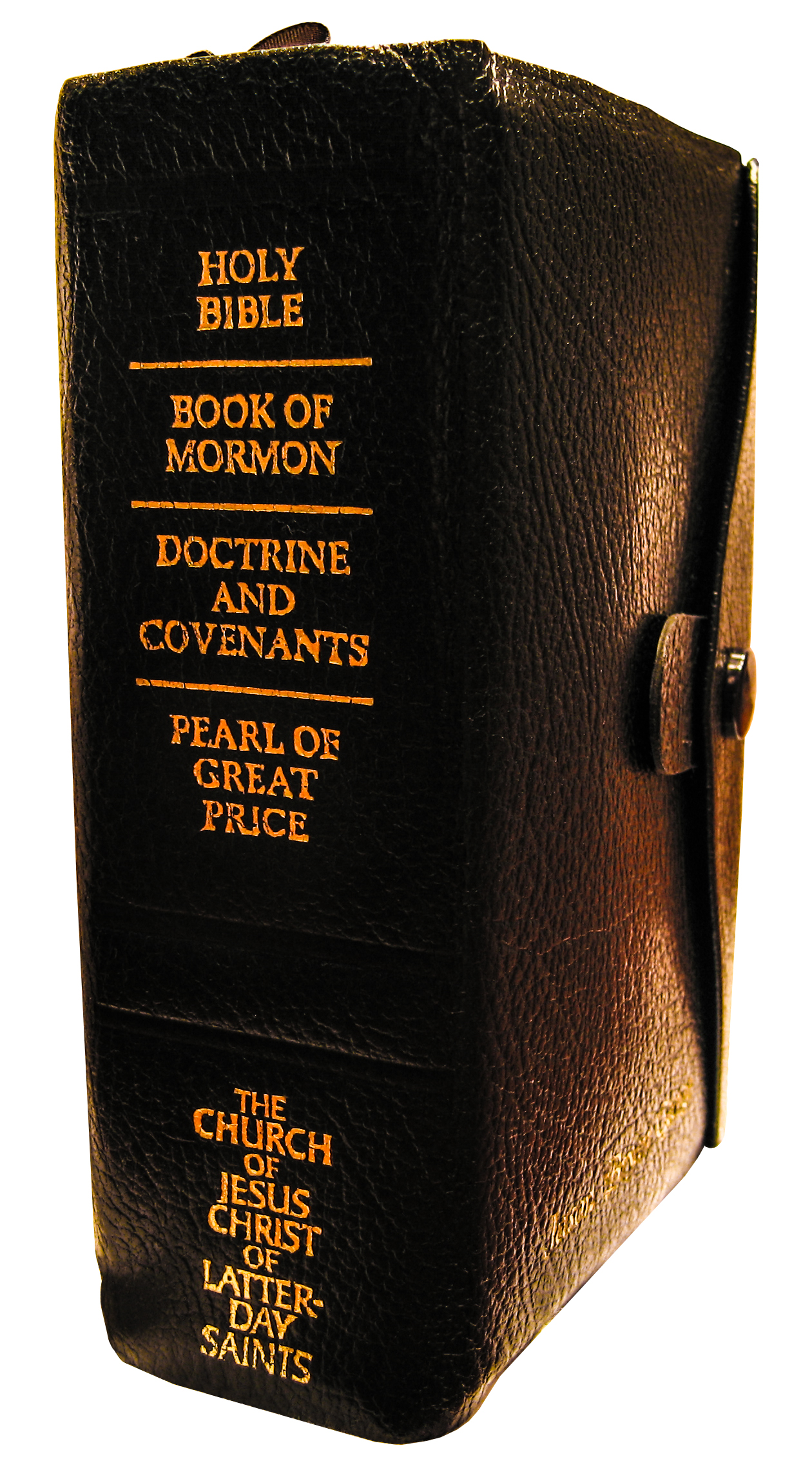
Compendium of the LDS Standard Works: the Bible, Book of Mormon, Doctrine and Covenants and Pearl of Great Price

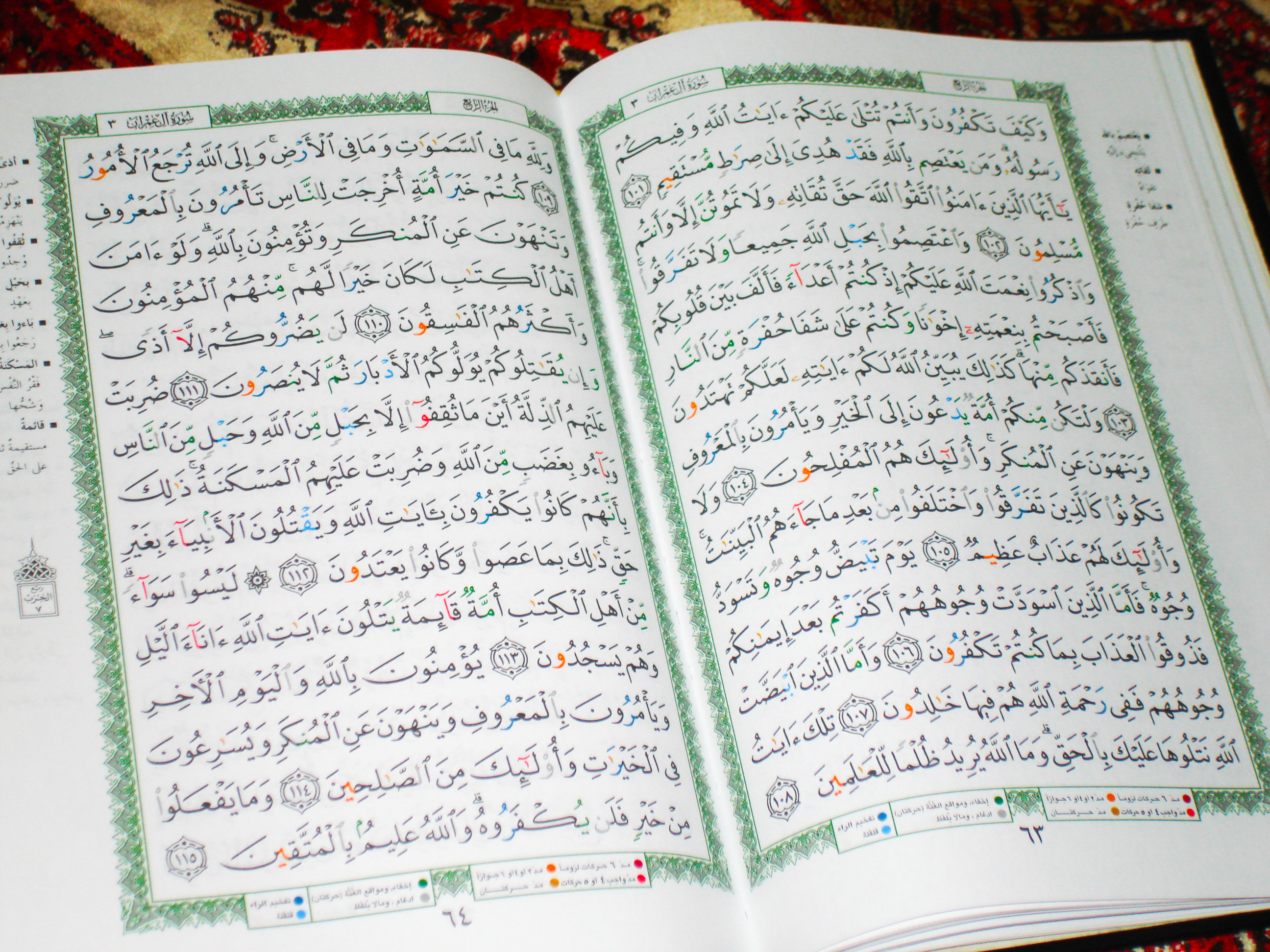
The Quran, in traditional Arabic text. For many Muslims, only the Arabic version is considered truly authentic; versions in other languages are considered commentaries on the Arabic original, not exact translations.

=== Quran ===
Islam holds that the Quran was revealed to Muhammad by the archangel Jibrīl (Gabriel) over a period of approximately 23 years, beginning in 610 CE when he was forty years old, and concluding in 632 CE, the year of his death. He first began receiving the 114 revelations that would comprise its contents while secluded for meditation and prayer in the Cave of Hira in the mountains outside of Mecca, in what is now Saudi Arabia. According to Islamic tradition, the illiterate Muhammad was confronted there by Jibrīl, who commanded him to "recite". Although deeply distressed by this event, Muhammad was comforted by his wife Khadijah and her Christian cousin, Waraqah ibn Nawfal, who encouraged him to accept the angel's visit. Following a three-year period without any further visits from Jibrīl (during which Muhammad continued to pray and devote himself to spiritual practices), the angel returned once more, and the other 113 Surahs of the Quran were revealed over the next 23 years, which were memorized by their hearers. Muhammad himself did not collect the Quran into a single, written volume; this was largely done after his death.

=== Latter-day Saint sacred texts ===
Members of the Church of Jesus Christ of Latter-day Saints (nicknamed Mormon) or Latter-day Saints believe that when Joseph Smith was about 14 years old, he decided to ask God which church was right because he had been visiting all the churches in his area and they all taught different doctrines and argued between each other. When he started to pray he was overcome by an evil feeling that made him feel like he was doomed. But calling upon God with all his energy, there appeared above him a pillar of light that gradually descended until he was completely immersed in it. As he looked up into the light he saw two personages of glory that looked exactly the same. The one pointed to the other and said, "Joseph, this is my Beloved Son, hear Him." The Saviour spoke to Joseph and told him to join no church because they were all teaching false doctrines and were not the true church. A few years later at age seventeen, an angel of God named Moroni appeared to him and told him of a collection of ancient writings engraved on golden plates by ancient prophets, buried in a nearby hill in Ontario County, New York. These writings became the Book of Mormon, and were said to have described a people whom God had led from Jerusalem to the Western Hemisphere 600 years before Jesus' birth. According to the narrative, Moroni was the last prophet among these people and had buried the record, which God had promised to bring forth in the latter days. Smith stated that he was instructed by Moroni to meet him at the hill annually each September 22 to receive further instructions; four years after the initial visit, in 1827, he was allowed to take the plates and was directed to translate them into English.

== Mormons and Muslims ==
=== God ===
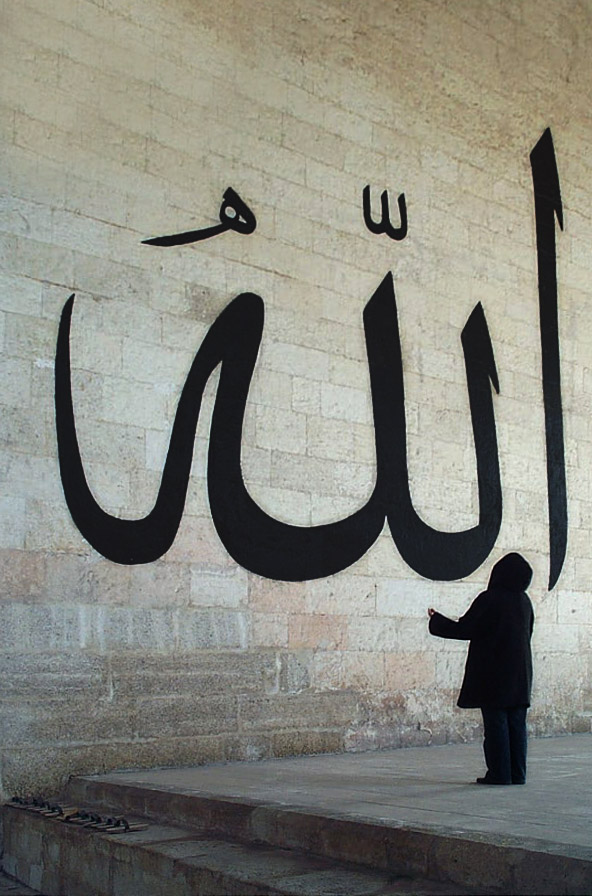
Allah script outside the Old Mosque in Edirne, Turkey

A notable area of difference between Mormons and Muslims lies in their religions' differing concepts of God. In Islam, Allah (the Arabic term for God) is seen as being unique, totally transcendent, absolutely and indivisibly One; this concept is called Tawhid in Islamic theology, and does not admit the possibility of division in the Godhead either in personality, essence or otherwise. It holds that God is one (wāḥid) and unique (ahad). The very term "Allah" itself is singular, and does not have a plural form in Arabic (unlike English, where "god" can be pluralized into "gods"). Allah is perceived by Muslims to be a unique, independent and indivisible being, who is utterly independent of and who precedes all of creation, having created all of it ex nihilo. Hence, the idea that there could be more than one God, or that God could be composed of distinct persons (however united these "persons" might be alleged to be in substance – as is held in the mainstream Trinitarian theology of Christianity – or in purpose alone, as alleged by the Mormons in opposition to the Christian doctrine), is all heresy of the worst possible kind for a Muslim. In fact, such ideas are referred to as Shirk, which is the most serious sin in Islamic law, and the only one designated by the Quran as being utterly unpardonable for the person who dies in it.

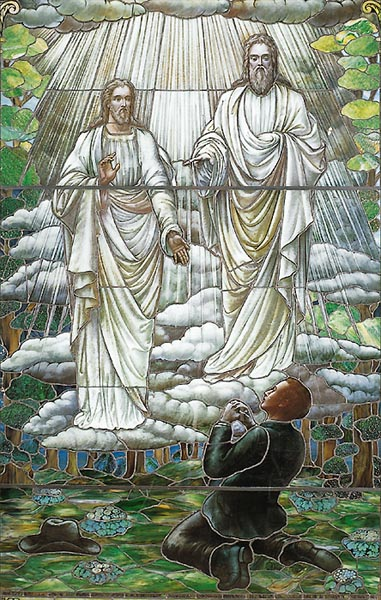
Joseph Smith claimed that he met Jesus and God the Father as two distinct physical beings during his First Vision

In stark contrast, Mormonism believes in a Godhead composed of three separate and distinct beings, who function as a single, unified God under the direction of the Father, who is held to be the senior member of this triad. Although the Book of Mormon and Doctrine and Covenants clearly identify the Father, Son and Holy Ghost as being "one God", this unity is seen as a metaphorical "oneness" in spirit, purpose and glory, rather than a physical or bodily union. The Mormon Book of Abraham, in its account of creation (one that generally parallels the one in the Biblical Book of Genesis), speaks of "the Gods", rather than "God", as accomplishing the act of creation.

Mormon Apostle Jeffrey R. Holland elaborated upon this concept during the General Conference of the LDS Church in 2007:

We believe these three divine persons constituting a single Godhead are united in purpose, in manner, in testimony, in mission. We believe Them to be filled with the same godly sense of mercy and love, justice and grace, patience, forgiveness, and redemption. I think it is accurate to say we believe They are one in every significant and eternal aspect imaginable except believing Them to be three persons combined in one substance, a Trinitarian notion never set forth in the scriptures because it is not true.... We declare it is self-evident from the scriptures that the Father, the Son, and the Holy Ghost are separate persons, three divine beings, noting such unequivocal illustrations as the Savior's great Intercessory Prayer [John 17], His baptism at the hands of John, the experience on the Mount of Transfiguration, and the martyrdom of Stephen—to name just four.

Latter-day Saints also believe, in marked contrast to Islam, that God the Father and Jesus Christ each have physical bodies of flesh and bone, and that the Father was once a man, who progressed to become what he is today. Furthermore, they believe that man is capable, by embracing and adhering completely to the Mormon religion, of evolving into a "god" himself in the next life, the LDS equivalent of theosis. In addition, the existence of a being colloquially known as "Heavenly Mother" is affirmed by the LDS Church, though prayer to her or speaking of her as being part of the Mormon Godhead are not encouraged. Islam rejects all of these concepts.

Whereas Muslims believe that Allah is absolutely above and separate from all of his creation, having created all of it from nothing, Mormonism considers both matter and intelligence to be co-eternal with him; rather, God (according to Mormonism) "organizes" the elements into planets, stars, living beings, and so forth. Islam considers this concept to be a deification of creation, which it sees as another form of Shirk.

=== Family relations ===
In Islam, several hadith stress the importance of keeping family relations alive and recommend that the distant relatives ought to be visited, even if it takes a year to travel to them. Brothers and sisters at home should help their parents when they becomes unable to support their children, while at the same time they should be equally benevolent to each other.

In Islam, all Muslims are considered brothers and sisters in the faith, and are often addressed by the titles "brother" and "sister". The same holds true in Mormonism.

Mormons also stress the importance of family relations. They designate Sunday as their Sabbath, a day of rest from worldly concerns and endeavors, to concentrate on spiritual matters (including communal worship) and family activities. They also designate Monday evenings as "Family Home Evening", an evening where all Mormons are encouraged to devote themselves exclusively to family togetherness and joint activities – temporal, as well as spiritual. Though Islam does not have a designated Sabbath (Friday, while the designated day for corporate worship, is otherwise mostly an ordinary work day for Muslims), it does encourage family togetherness.

Mormonism teaches that families can be together throughout eternity, through the rite of eternal marriage and sealing ordinances as performed in Mormon temples. If a Mormon in good standing receives these rites and continues faithful to his or her religion until death, he or she is guaranteed to be reunited in the next life with all other family members who have done the same. Islam declares that all of those who remain faithful to Islam and achieve Jannah (Heaven, or "Paradise" as it is often called) will be reunited with their families there, or at least so many of them as have remained equally faithful to their religion and achieved the same reward.

=== Prophets ===
Islamic theology recognizes as many as 124,000 prophets. The Quran identifies 25 prophets by name, starting with Adam and ending with Muhammad.

Five of these are considered particularly important in Islam:

1. Nuh (Noah)
2. Ibrahim (Abraham)
3. Musa (Moses)
4. Isa (Jesus)
5. Muhammad

Of these five, four are equally revered in Mormonism, with two uniquely Mormon scriptures, the Book of Abraham and the Book of Moses attributed to two of them. Of the 25 prophets named in the Quran, only Adam, Noah, Abraham, Ishmael, Isaac, Jacob, Lot, Joseph, Job, Moses, Aaron, David, Solomon, Elijah, Elisha, Jonah, Zechariah, John and Jesus are recognized by Mormonism. Aaron also lends his name to one of the two "priesthoods" of Mormonism: the Aaronic priesthood. The other Quranic prophets (Hud, Salih, Shuayb, Dhul-Kifl and Mohammed) are not recognized by Mormons, although Shuayb and Dhul-Kifl are sometimes identified with Jethro and Ezekiel. Hud is sometimes identified with Eber of the Bible. At least one Latter-day Saint scholar has noted parallels between the narrative of the Quranic prophet Hud and the Book of Mormon prophet Lehi, speculating that they may have been the same person.

=== Muhammad and Joseph Smith ===
Some Latter-day Saints consider Muhammad to have received a portion of God's light, and that moral truths were given to him to enlighten nations and to bring a higher level of understanding to individuals. However, it does not consider him to have been a prophet in the same sense as modern-day LDS prophets nor ancient prophets found in the Bible and Book of Mormon, and does not accept the Quran as scripture. Conversely, Islam does not accept Joseph Smith as a prophet, for it believes Muhammad to have been the final prophet of God to humankind. It equally does not accept the Book of Mormon, or any of the other Latter-day Saint Standard Works, as the Quran is believed to be God's final revelation for all time, and for all people.

=== Jesus ===
In Islam, Jesus is considered to be a human Prophet of God who was sent to guide the Children of Israel with a new scripture, the Injīl, or Gospel. The Quran states that Jesus was born to Mary (Arabic: Maryam) as the result of a virginal conception, a miraculous event which occurred by the decree of God. To aid him in his ministry, Jesus was given the ability to perform miracles, all by the permission of God rather than his own power. According to the Quran and other Islamic texts, Jesus was neither killed nor crucified, but Muslims disagree as to the precise interpretation of these texts; many believe he was raised up alive to Jannah by God. Some Islamic traditions narrate that Jesus will return to Earth near the Day of judgment to restore justice and defeat al-Masīḥ ad-Dajjāl (lit. "the false messiah", also known as the Antichrist). Like all prophets in Islam, Jesus is considered to have been a Muslim, as he preached for people to adopt the straight path in submission to God's will. Islam rejects that Jesus was God incarnate or the Son of God, stating that he was an ordinary man who, like other prophets, had been divinely chosen to spread God's message.

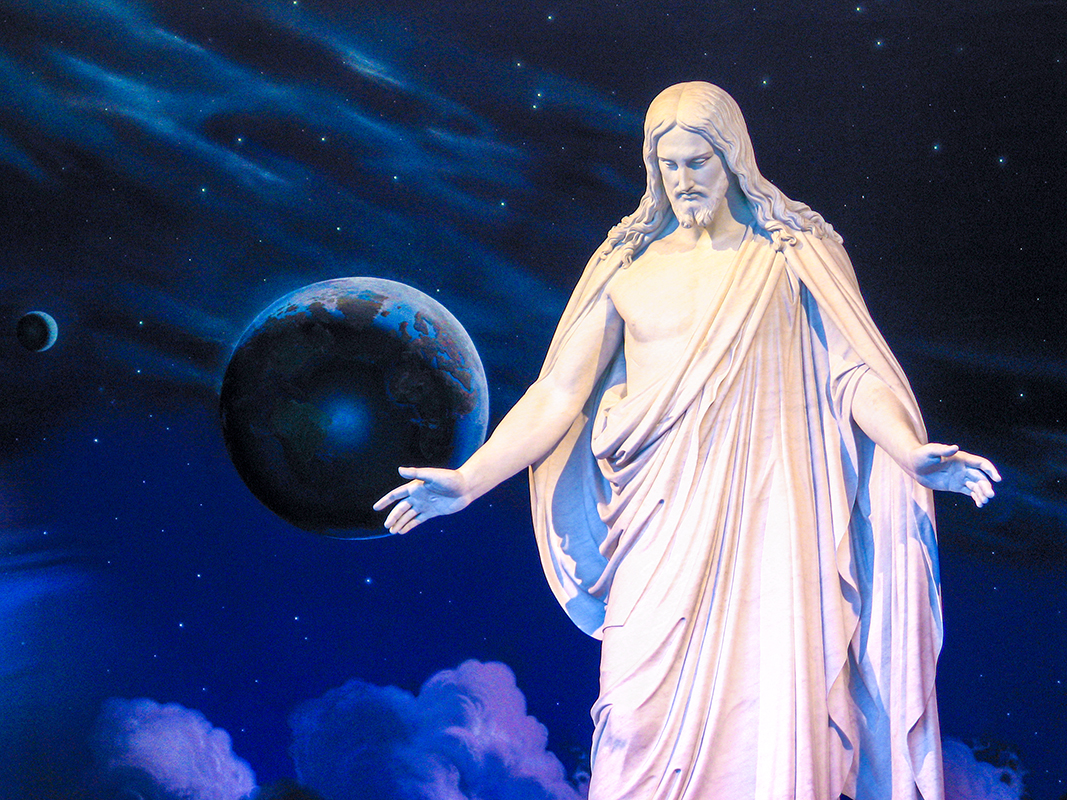
Mormons see Jesus Christ as the Savior and premier figure of their religion.

According to Mormon doctrine, Jesus Christ is the eldest Son of God the Father. Latter-day Saints identify Jesus with the Old Testament Jehovah per his declaration, "I AM that I AM." Because of Christ's suffering, death, and resurrection, all mankind is saved from death, and will rise again and receive a perfected physical body. Furthermore, the Atonement satisfies the demands of justice; grace, forgiveness, and mercy (i.e. salvation) are extended to all who accept Christ as their Savior, receive the saving ordinances that he commanded, and become his life-long disciples.

Mormonism has a different perception of the Christian concept of original sin, and believes individual sin requires an atonement, or infinite, redeeming sacrifice, which had to be accomplished by Jesus Christ after the individual has sought repentance.

=== Salvation and the afterlife ===
==== Similarities ====
The Church of Jesus Christ of Latter-day Saints and Islam each believe in a life after death: belief in the Last Judgment and an Afterlife is one of the Six Articles of Belief of Islam; it also forms an essential element of the Mormon belief system. Islamic and Mormon concepts of the next world share some common characteristics, which include:

- Belief that there are multiple degrees or spiritual levels in heaven (Muslims also believe there are multiple degrees in hell);
- Belief that one's place in the afterlife is determined solely by God, based upon one's good works, as well as one's faith; and
- Belief that a believer's family, if appropriately faithful to the religion, can join them in the next world.

Islam teaches that the purpose of man's creation is essentially to be kind to other human beings and to worship the Creator of the Heavens and Earth: Allah. It furthermore teaches that life lived on this Earth is a test for man to determine each individual's ultimate reward or punishment in the afterlife, which is eternal. These concepts are also held by Mormonism, which views human earthly existence as a trial, designed to see who will prove faithful to God's commands, and thus be worthy to inherit the highest possible exaltation (which Mormons equate to "godhood", something Islam vehemently opposes). Those who prove less faithful will inherit a lesser reward, but will still be compensated for the good they did.

==== Islamic views ====
In Islam, salvation refers to one's entrance to Jannah, or heaven. This word does not encompass the alternate possibility of Jahannam, or hell, nor to the multiple degrees Islam believes to exist in each location. The Quran teaches that the only sin which guarantees damnation for any human being is that of Shirk, or associating other beings or entities with the one, true God: Allah (meaning those who die in such a state; those who repent and embrace Islam during their earthly lives are forgiven this sin). Hence:

- Those who die in a state of Shirk will never be forgiven, and will spend eternity in hell.
- Those who die believing in the One God (such as Jews and Christians), but not in Islam, may (or may not) be forgiven by Allah; their eternal state will be determined by him.
- Those who die believing sincerely in Islam will ultimately be saved, regardless of their deeds; however, Allah may consign them to a period in hell before admitting them to Jannah (also called "Paradise"), if their deeds warrant it.

Ultimately, says Islam, all true Muslims will inherit Paradise, even those who are initially confined to hell. However, with multiple levels in Jannah, not every Muslim will inherit the same degree. Furthermore, avoiding hell (described in the Quran as a place of terrible pain and suffering) requires more than belief: it requires repentance from sin and adherence to God's laws. However, Islam emphasizes that good deeds alone do not gain one admission to heaven; ultimately, Allah's mercy alone is what forgives sin and enables man to attain anything good in the next life. The varying degrees of reward (and of punishment) are a manifestation of God's justice: the level of goodness (or evil) one sows in this life, will be reaped accordingly in the next. Mormonism, for its part, believes almost precisely the same with regard to the role of God's mercy, grace and justice in judgment and salvation.

==== Latter-day Saint views ====
The Latter-day Saint concept of the afterlife comprises three "Degrees of Glory", together with a state of existence called "Outer Darkness", which is not considered a "kingdom of glory". Entry into one of these kingdoms is determined by God, based upon one's deeds, beliefs and receipt of a series of ordinances mandated by the Latter-day Saint religion. For those who did not have a chance to hear about Jesus Christ or receive Latter-day Saint rites during their earthly life, the LDS Church Temples provide a means for their salvation through proxies who receive the ordinances on their behalf. The three kingdoms are:

- The Celestial Kingdom, which is composed of all who have accepted Jesus Christ (in this life or after death), and received all the required ordinances, and who have lived righteous and upright lives on the earth (whether they were Latter-day Saints in this life or not);
- The Terrestrial Kingdom, which is reserved for those who refused to accept the saving ordinances by proper authority (Latter-day Saints believe this authority is limited to their church) after having heard of it during this life, but were otherwise honorable and upright people, together with those who failed to live up to the covenants (promises made to God) sufficiently once having received them.
- The Telestial Kingdom, which comprises those who refused to accept the gospel of Jesus Christ at all (under the banner of any Christian religion) during their lifetimes, together with "liars, and sorcerers, and adulterers, and whore-mongers, and whosoever loves and makes a lie." Although LDS theology declares that even this lowest degree is incomparably better than anything on earth, it also insists that those assigned to this kingdom will have to reside in a sort of hell for 1,000 years during the Millennial reign of Christ, prior to entering the Telestial Kingdom.

In addition to this, there is a fourth destination, which Latter-day Saints specifically reject as being a kingdom or having any glory, referred to as Outer Darkness. This is the abode of those who are sent there after the Last Judgment, where they will dwell in a place of great torment, "the end thereof, neither the place thereof, nor their torment, no man knows; Neither was it revealed, neither is, neither will be revealed unto man, except to them who are made partakers thereof." This group will comprise Satan and his angels, together with those who have become "sons of perdition" by committing the unpardonable sin, which is to deny Christ after receiving a witness of him through the Holy Ghost.

=== Charity ===
Charitable giving forms an important part of Islamic and Mormon teaching. One of the Five Pillars of Islam is the payment of Zakat, a mandatory contribution of 2.5% of one's excess wealth, after legitimate needs and expenses (including taxes) have been paid. The poorest Muslims (those below a certain minimum level of wealth) are excused from this payment, as are those who have experienced a net loss in the year's income compared to the previous year's. This money is distributed to extremely poor and needy Muslims, indebted and traveling Muslims, those who seek to propagate the religion, and also to free captives. Muslims are also enjoined to give above and beyond this 2.5%, in what is referred to as Sadaqah, or charity, according to their means. Islam emphasizes the obligatory nature of Zakat, and states that no one who refuses to give who is able will be accepted by God.

Mormonism equally emphasizes charitable giving, starting with a tithe of 10% of one's gross income, generally before taxes or expenses are paid. This tithe is mandatory of all who wish to obtain a temple recommend, a requirement to enter LDS temples (as opposed to regular Mormon meetinghouses where anyone can attend weekly worship services). This money goes to finance the day-to-day operations and activities of the LDS Church. In addition to this, a Fast Sunday is observed once per month, where a special Fast offering is collected to be given to the poor and needy amongst the Mormon people. The amount given during this special offering is generally expected to equal or exceed the amount one would have spent on the two meals which one is asked to forego on that day.

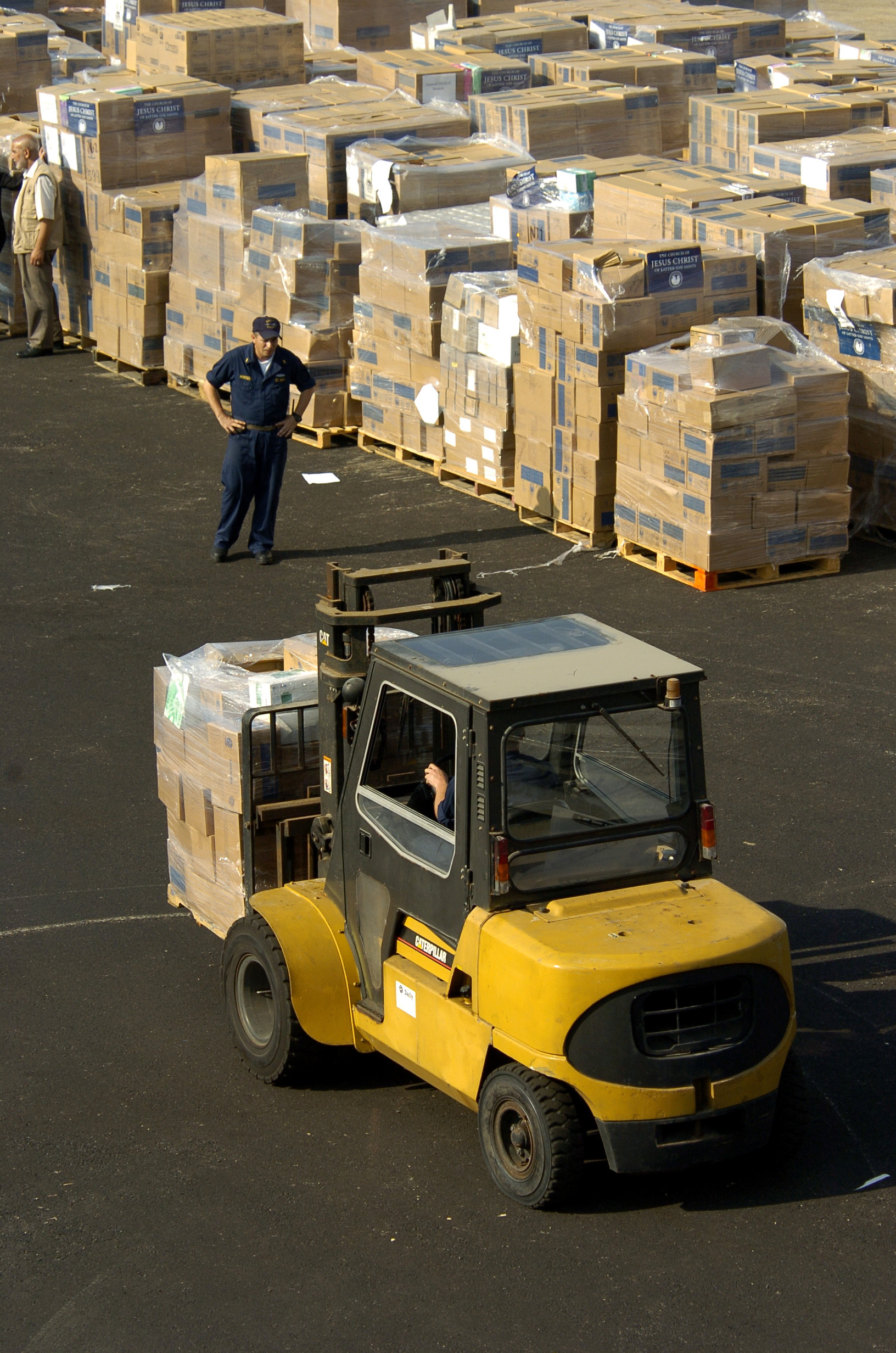
U.S. Navy sailors from the HSV-2 Swift move more than 100 tons of humanitarian aid to the pier at Beirut, Lebanon during the 2006 Israel-Lebanon conflict, to be disbursed to Lebanese citizens in coordination with the International Islamic Relief Organization.

Mormons and Muslims have recently cooperated in charitable work. In May 2006, the LDS Church donated $1.6 million USD worth of emergency supplies to devastated areas following the earthquake in Java, Indonesia, teaming up with Islamic Relief Worldwide who provided transportation in conjunction with The Islamic Medical Association of North America. That same year, Muslim and Mormon organizations cooperated again in the distribution of humanitarian aid to Lebanese citizens, during the 2006 Israel-Lebanon conflict.

=== Polygamy and celestial marriage ===
In Islam, polygyny is allowed, and is practiced in some Muslim countries, although under certain restrictions. The single passage in the Quran dealing directly with the topic of polygyny is in Surah 4 Verse 3:

And if you fear that you cannot act equitably towards orphans, then marry such women as seem good to you, two and three and four; but if you fear that you will not do justice (between them), then (marry) only one or what your right hands possess; this is more proper, that you may not deviate from the right course.

The practice of polygamy continues among some Muslims worldwide, including a small share (less than 1%) of American Muslims. Most American Muslim leaders openly discourage this practice, however, as being contrary to United States law.

Early in its history, The Church of Jesus Christ of Latter-day Saints practiced polygamy in the United States and referred to it as "plural marriage". It was publicly announced by the church in 1852, and the plural marriage ceremony (as conducted by an authorized priesthood leader) was viewed as a sacred, eternal ordinance. Only a small percentage of church members, including leaders, ever practiced polygamy. The practice was formally introduced by Joseph Smith in the LDS Doctrine and Covenants 132, as being from "the Lord thy God ...the Alpha and Omega". These developments quickly led to the enacting of anti-polygamy laws, with the U.S. Congress making polygamy illegal in U.S. territories in 1862. Although Latter-day Saints contended that their religiously based practice of plural marriage was protected by the United States Constitution, the Supreme Court of the United States determined otherwise, leading to the formal ending of the practice in 1890, reinforced by further decrees in 1904 mandating excommunication for any member either practicing or advocating polygamy. Certain fundamentalist Mormon sects continue to practice plural marriage today, albeit outside of the mainstream LDS Church body.

Although the mainstream LDS Church has renounced the practice of plural marriage, it still believes and teaches that a celestial marriage contracted between a single unmarried man and a single unmarried woman in one of its temples is eternal. They see such a union as being indispensable for "exaltation" to "godhood" in the next life, and deny an eternal union to all marriages contracted elsewhere.

=== Fasting ===
Fasting forms an important part of both Mormon and Muslim doctrine. Mormons are encouraged to fast from all food and drink (including water) each Fast Sunday (generally the first Sunday of each month). They generally skip two meals (24 hours) during their fast and donate what they would have spent on those meals to those in need. Although this is the only church-scheduled period of recommended fasting, Mormons are encouraged to fast at other times, for personal revelation or during times of prayer and contemplation. Fasting without prayer and sincere devotion to God is not regarded as of much spiritual benefit in the LDS Church.

Islam has as one of its "five pillars" the practice of Sawm, which is not merely fasting from all food and drink (including water), but equally from impure thoughts, words and deeds. Islamic fasting also requires one to refrain from smoking and sexual intercourse during the period of the fast, as well. The infirm and travelers may delay their fasting until a later date, but must make up every obligatory day missed. While Sawm is optional during most of the year (and forbidden altogether on Islam's two holiest days: Eid ul Fitr and Eid ul Adha), it is mandatory during daylight hours throughout the month of Ramadan, the ninth month of the Islamic calendar. It was during this month that the first verses of the Quran were said to have been revealed to Muhammad. The elderly, and those whose health is endangered by fasting (such as diabetics) are excused from doing so, but are required to make up for it by feeding the poor.

=== Proselytizing ===
Both Muslims and Mormons are active in proselytizing those outside of their religion, inviting them to learn about their faith and adopt it for themselves, if they so decide. In Islam, this is referred to as Da'wah, and it is considered incumbent upon all Muslims to actively invite non-Muslims to the faith. Da'wah is equally described as the duty to "actively encourage fellow Muslims in the pursuance of greater piety in all aspects of their lives". In Islamic theology, the purpose of Da'wah is to invite all people, both Muslims and non-Muslims, to understand the proper worship of God as expressed in the Quran, as well as to inform them about Muhammad. The government of Saudi Arabia spends significant amounts of money to propagate Islam throughout the world, via the building of mosques, printing and distribution of Qurans and other literature, and financing of missionaries.

The LDS Church also has a widespread proselytizing program, and are perhaps best known to others for this activity. Most of these missionaries are young Mormons (generally aged 18–26), though some are older couples or individuals. All persons aged eight and older, who are considering membership in the LDS Church, are taught by church missionaries prior to baptism. Once this person has been sufficiently instructed, he or she will be interviewed by another missionary to ensure their proper preparation for membership in the church. In certain situations, an interview with the area mission president may be necessary before the church agrees to baptize an individual.

=== Images ===
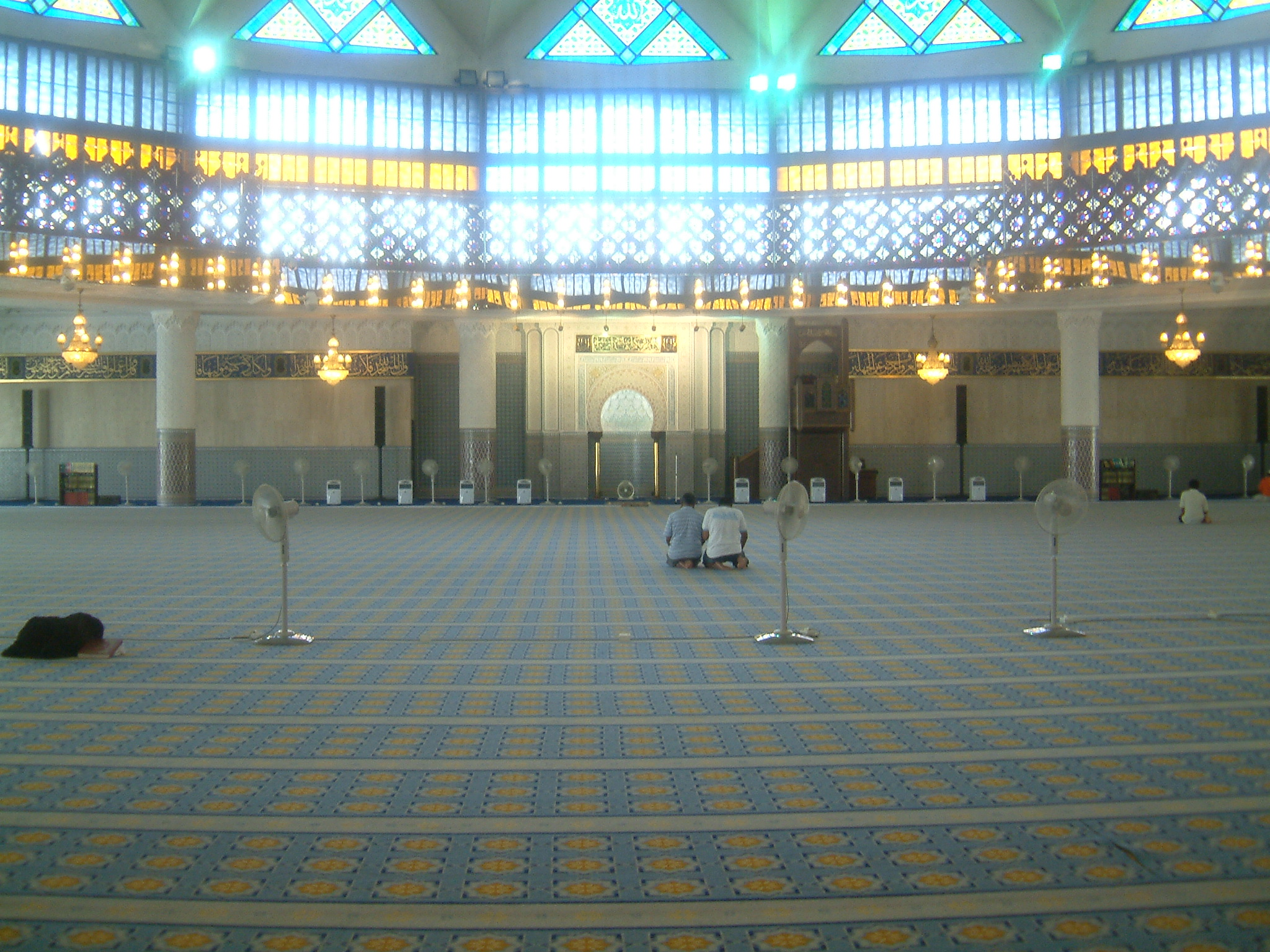
Interior of the national mosque of Malaysia. Neither Mormons nor Muslims permit drawings or photos inside their places of worship; the Mormons do allow some in the hallways and elsewhere outside of their chapels.

According to the Quran, idolatry or assigning partners to the One God (Arabic: shirk) is an egregious sin. It is seen as different from all other sins and is categorized as the one and only categorically unforgivable sin. Hence, depicting religious themes, and specifically God, is seen as inappropriate and unbecoming. Islam does not believe that Allah may be depicted in any artistic manner whatsoever, nor represented by any kind of image, no matter what reason one may have for doing so. Furthermore, the Sunni portion of Islam, comprising approximately 85% of the world's Muslims, also rejects all depictions of their prophets – whether artistic or photographic (as in a movie). For instance, the 1998 DreamWorks animated film The Prince of Egypt was banned in Egypt, Malaysia, the Maldives and Indonesia, as these predominately Muslim countries objected to any depiction of Moses, whom Islam views as a prophet.

Latter-day Saints do not generally approve of or own crucifixes, and do not typically have statues in their local ward meeting houses, though some have been erected in LDS Visitor Centers and elsewhere. Portraits of Jesus, together with photographs or paintings of current and/or past church leaders, are allowed in LDS meetinghouses, but not in the main worship area (called the Chapel), and they are not permitted for use as objects of devotion, as in Roman Catholic or Eastern Orthodox churches. A common Mormon statue is that of an angel blowing a trumpet, commonly identified as Moroni, which is placed on the tallest spire of many LDS temples, facing eastward. These are, however, purely artistic in nature.

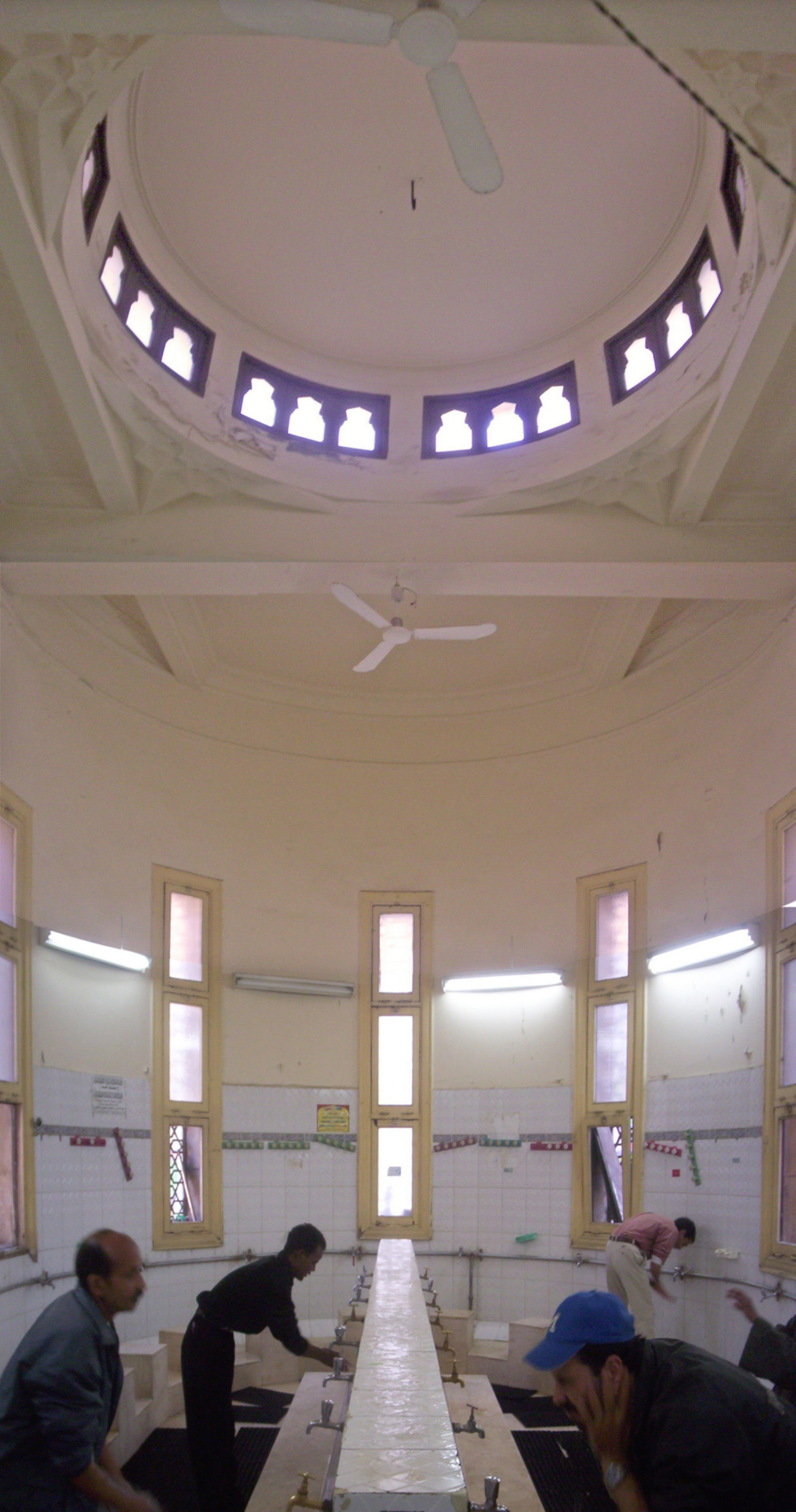
Muslims performing Wudu, the ritual of washing one's hands, arms, feet and head prior to Salat or other prayers.

=== Washing ===
Muslims are commanded in the Quran to purify themselves prior to prayer by engaging in a ritual of washing known as Wudu. Although there are a few slight differences between the specifics of the Sunni and Shi'ite practice, Wudu always involves using clean water to wash the hands, mouth, nose, face, the arms up to the elbows, the feet up to the ankles, and wiping the head and ears with wet hands (called Masah). This must be done prior to each performance of Salat, the five-times-daily ritual prayers required of all Muslims, and must also be done prior to other ritual prayers. Those who have been able to preserve their ritual cleanliness according to Islamic rules are not required to perform Wudu, but are encouraged to do so nonetheless. This washing is accompanied by specified prayers and a sincere intention to perform Wudu in the heart.

For those adult Muslims who have had sexual intercourse or any sexual discharge (e.g. of semen), or who have completed the menstrual cycle or given birth, the performance of ghusl is prescribed, replacing Wudu for that particular instance. In Ghusl, one bathes the entire body from head to foot, leaving none of it unwashed, again with sincere intention and prayers. Islam also recommends (i.e. it is mustahab) performance of the full ablution before the Friday and Eid prayers, before entering the ehram, in preparation for hajj, after having lost consciousness, and after formally converting to Islam.

For those Muslims unable to find clean water to wash with, a ritual known as Tayammum is commanded, in which a Muslim uses "clean earth" to ritually cleanse his hands, arms, and face. This is only permitted if clean water is unavailable, or if the water is more than 1.7 km away.

Although Mormonism does not require a special rite of washing prior to daily prayer or corporate worship, its special ceremony of washing and anointing (also called the "Initiatory") is an ordinance that symbolizes ritual cleansing and anointing to be a king or queen in heaven. In The Church of Jesus Christ of Latter-day Saints, this rite is performed exclusively in temples. The ordinance of washing and anointing symbolizes the ritual cleansings of priests that took place at Israel's Tabernacle, the temple of Solomon, and at later temples in Jerusalem (see Exod. 28:40–42, 29:4–9, 29:20–21, 29:29–30, 30:18–21). As the name suggests, this ordinance has two parts, a ritual washing in water by a like-gendered person specially ordained to this task, followed by anointing with oil. This ritual is generally administered as a precursor to the endowment, one of the most important of Mormon temple ordinances.

=== Dietary rules and alcohol ===
Both Mormonism and Islam forbid the drinking of alcoholic beverages. Both also offer their members a list of substances that are forbidden for consumption to believers.

Islamic jurisprudence specifies certain foods as being halāl, or lawful, and others as harām, or unlawful. These designations are based upon rules found in the Quran. Other restrictions have been added to these in various fatawa (authoritative Islamic statements of religious opinion) given by mujtahids (Islamic scholars) with various degrees of strictness. These are not always held to be authoritative by all Muslims everywhere. According to the Quran, the only foods explicitly forbidden are:

- Meat from animals that die of themselves, or are strangled, gored or beaten to death;
- Anything containing blood;
- The meat of swine (this includes all products containing pork, or any derivative or by-product of pork); and
- Animals dedicated to, or slaughtered in the name of, anyone other than God.

However, should a Muslim find themselves in a situation where no other food is available other than some product mentioned above, he or she is permitted to eat of it, but only in such an amount as proves necessary to sustain one's life.

In addition to these items, Islam generally forbids the eating of any beast of prey, or any beast having fangs, together with all meat that has not been slaughtered under the name of Allah, in accordance with Islamic ritual laws. Jewish-certified kosher meat is considered Halal for Muslims, as it is still slaughtered according to ancient practices meant to minimize the animal's suffering, and also to invoke the name of God at the time of the animal's death. The Quran specifically authorizes consumption of such meat, though modern Muslim practice generally forbids eating of non-Kosher or non-certified-Halal meat (such as is prepared in Western slaughterhouses), because the name of God is no longer mentioned over those animals that are slaughtered there, nor do modern slaughter methods correspond to traditionally approved Muslim ones.

In addition to these items, Alcoholic beverages – or any intoxicant – are forbidden in Islam. According to the Quran, "intoxicants and games of chance" are "abominations of Satan's handiwork".

Similarly, a set of Mormon dietary rules are found in the LDS D&C 89, which contains three elements:

- A list of substances such as wine, strong drink, so-called hot drinks (interpreted as coffee and tea – but not herbal teas – by the LDS Church), and tobacco, that are not to be used at all ( 89:1–9);
- A list of foods that may be used, albeit sometimes with certain limitations (including meat, which is advised to be eaten "sparingly", but this is no longer emphasized) ( 89:10–17); and
- A promise to those who follow the guidelines, that they shall "run and not be weary; they shall walk and not faint" ( 89:18–21).

The sole exception made to the prohibitions contained in this "Word of Wisdom" is for wine used as part of the Mormon Sacrament of Communion), commonly referred to as "the Sacrament". The revelation indicates that if wine is used for the Sacrament, it must be pure and either "of your own make" or made by other Mormons. The LDS Church no longer uses wine in its Sacrament, having replaced it with water in conformity to a revelation on the subject; thus members are no longer permitted to drink any alcoholic beverages. Tobacco, for its part, is stated as being "not for the body, neither for the belly, and [it] is not good for man, but is an herb for bruises and all sick cattle, to be used with judgment and skill."

While forbidding alcohol, Islam does not prohibit coffee or tea, though some fatawa prohibit tobacco. Conversely, the LDS Church no longer has any restrictions on the types of meat one may eat, or when one may consume them (except for designated fasting periods – see above).

== Other Latter Day Saint denominations and Islam ==
Besides The Church of Jesus Christ of Latter Day Saints, the Latter Day Saint movement contains several smaller factions, many (though not all) of which broke from the LDS Church in the decades following Joseph Smith's death.

These churches all reject various teachings of the mainline LDS Church, with specific differences varying from denomination to denomination. Most reject the LDS notion that God was ever once a man, or that man can become a god, as taught within the LDS Church. However, with the notable exception of the Strangites, each of these sects accepts in some way or another the traditional Christian division of the Godhead into three persons: Father, Son and Holy Ghost, thus placing each in fundamental opposition to Islamic dogma. The Strangites are closer to Islam by insisting that only the Father is God; however, their assertion that God has a body of flesh places them at odds with Islam, as well.

Islam does have acceptance of polygamy in common with the Strangites and Fundamentalist Mormons. Strangites, however, have given up the actual practice of (though not belief in) polygamy, while the Fundamentalist Mormons continue to practice it today. The other Latter Day Saint factions generally reject polygamy, together with eternal marriage, the Book of Abraham, and various other distinctive mainline LDS doctrines. While much of this renders them closer to Islam in some ways than the mainline LDS Church, numerous irreconcilable differences in doctrine and practices still persist between these smaller factions and the Muslim faith.

The Community of Christ has used at least one Quranic text (Surah 5, verse 8) in an official publication for its youth, and has offered a "Peace Colloquy" featuring a speaker who endeavored to present Islam in a positive light.

== See also ==
- Islam and other religions
  - Christianity and Islam
  - Judaism and Islam
  - Protestantism and Islam
- Criticism of Muhammad
- Criticism of Islam
- Criticism of Mormon sacred texts
- Criticism of the Church of Jesus Christ of Latter-day Saints
- Mormonism and Christianity
- Mormonism and Judaism
