= Universalism and the Latter Day Saint movement =

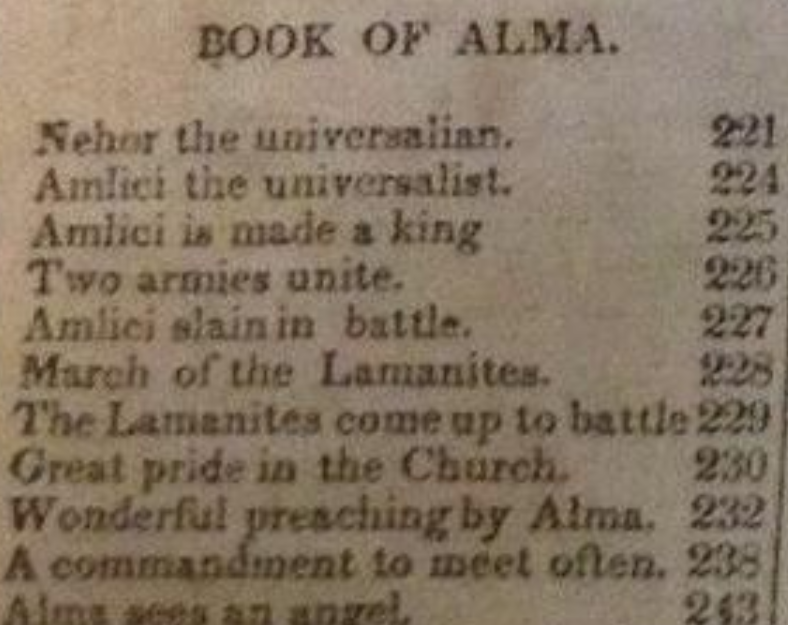
Excerpt from an 1835 Reference to the Book of Mormon highlighting that early Latter Day Saints viewed Book of Mormon figures Nehor and Amlici as Universalists

Christian universalism was a theology widespread in the early United States coinciding with the founding of the Latter Day Saint movement (also known as Mormonism) in 1830. Universalists believed that God would save all of humanity. Universalism peaked in popularity during the 1820s and 1830s, and the idea of universal salvation for all humanity was hotly debated. Several revelations of the founder of the Latter Day Saint movement, Joseph Smith, dealt with issues regarding Universalism, and it was a prominent heresy in the Book of Mormon. Smith's father was a Universalist, while his mother was a traditional Calvinist, creating strain in the Smith family home.

The Book of Mormon is generally seen as containing anti-Universalist rhetoric of the 1820s, supporting the idea that Hell is real and a place where the wicked will suffer for eternity. The extent that the debates over Universalism from the 1820s influenced the Book of Mormon is controversial for Latter Day Saints, as many believe the book to be of ancient origin. Later revelations were seen by early members and outsiders as supporting a more universalist approach, where the wicked are still redeemed in heaven. This view on salvation led many to leave the early church.

== Background ==
=== Universalism in the Early United States ===
The 18th century saw the establishment of the Universalist Church in America, in part by the efforts of Hosea Ballou.

The distinguishing doctrine of Universalism was that God would save all of humanity regardless of their righteousness or wickedness. To a Universalist, eternal damnation was an excessive and unjust punishment that far outweighed any sin a person could commit, and antithetical to a merciful God. Prominent Universalist advocate Hosea Ballou summarized the motivation for the doctrine with the rhetorical question:

Your child has fallen into the mire, and its body and its garments are defiled. You cleanse it, and array it in clean robes. The query is, Do you love your child because you have washed it? Or, Did you wash it because you loved it?

Universalists were divided on the extent of the punishment of the sinner:

Restorationist Universalists

Believed sinners would be temporarily punished after death before eventually being saved.

Ultra-Universalists or Modern Universalists

Believed that all would be saved with no punishment, did not believe in divinity of Jesus or the need for an atonement.

Universalism was brought to the North American colonies in the early 18th century by the English-born physician George de Benneville and popularized by John Murray, Elhanan Winchester, and Hosea Ballou. It reached its apex of popularity in 1833, becoming the fourth or fifth largest denomination in the United States. Debates over Universalism were ubiquitous in the American theological landscape. It was seen as a threat by the orthodox, Calvinist Congregationalists of New England such as Jonathan Edwards, who wrote prolifically against universalist teachings and preachers. While the mainline Protestant movements (e.g. Presbyterians, Congregationalists, Methodists, Baptists, and Episcopalians) frequently disagreed among themselves, they were united in rejecting Universalism as heresy, and are generally referred to today as the orthodox viewpoint, or anti-Universalists.

== Universalism and early Latter Day Saints ==
In 1823, there were around 90 Universalist congregations in the greater Finger Lakes area where Mormonism was founded. In 1818, speaking of a town 15 miles south of Joseph Smith's family home, minister David Millard said, "Universalism was a predominant opinion in the place." Christian universalism was also a prominent theology in Smith's home growing up. His father, Joseph Smith Sr., along with his uncle Jesse and grandfather Aesel, founded a Universalist Society in Topsfield, Massachusetts, in 1797. Topsfield was just 15 miles north of the residence of influential Universalist minister John Murray.

Joseph Smith Sr. continued his belief in Universalism into adulthood for which he was criticized by some of his neighbors. Joseph Smith Sr.'s belief in Universalism contributed to his and some of his children's disdain for revivalist churches in the 1820s. In 1823, when Smith's older brother Alvin died, the minister who conducted his funeral implied that Alvin had gone to Hell since he had never been baptized, which angered the elder Joseph Smith. Joseph Smith Jr.'s mother, Lucy Mack Smith, was an orthodox Presbyterian, creating tension in the Smith family home because of the parents' differing creeds. Some of the Smiths' children followed their mother and were baptized as Presbyterians; others followed their father and were baptized, including Joseph Smith Jr. Joseph Smith Jr.'s grandfather, Asael Smith, remained unmoved in his Universalist convictions upon hearing of Mormonism, but according to family tradition, he did eventually renounce Universalism on his deathbed in November 1830. Joseph Smith Sr. also changed his mind about the need for baptism and was baptized on April 6, 1830. Joseph Smith Jr. was overwhelmed and declared, "Oh! My God I have lived to see my own father baptized into the true church of Jesus Christ!"

Lucy Mack's father, Solomon Mack, converted from Universalism to a non-Universalist form of Christianity in the early 1800s and back to Universalism in 1818. One of the scribes of the Book of Mormon, Martin Harris, was also a Universalist before joining the Latter Day Saint movement. Joseph Knight Sr. and members of his family had also been Universalists. Despite these notable exceptions, however, early Latter-day Saints in the 1830s were generally not sympathetic to Universalists.

== Universalism and the Book of Mormon ==
Although the Book of Mormon is centrally concerned with individuals' salvation from sin and spiritual death, it rejects the notion of universal salvation as heretical. Discussions of themes related to Universalism in the Book of Mormon echo debates ongoing in the early nineteenth-century United States. Early converts may have felt their anti-Universalist views confirmed by the Book of Mormon.

The anti-Universalism of the Book of Mormon was recognized by its early readers, including both adherents and critics. Prominent opponent Alexander Campbell wrote, "This prophet Smith ... wrote ... in his book of Mormon, every error and almost every truth discussed in N. York for the last ten years. He decides all the great controversies" and included "eternal punishment" as one of those controversies. Early Latter-day Saint Sylvester Smith wrote in 1833 that "the Universalist says it [the Book of Mormon] reproaches his creed." Another early convert, Eli Gilbert of Connecticut, said that the Book of Mormon, shortly after publication, "bore hard upon my favorite notions of universal salvation".

Amongst anti-Universalists, there was general agreement that there was a binary doctrine of heaven and hell, but opinions differed on who would ultimately be saved. Calvinism, for example, believed that an omniscient God already had decided who would be saved, and humankind's actions on earth would do little to change things. The Book of Mormon generally aligned with Methodists of the time, who divided humankind into five groups:

Group of People	Methodist View	Book of Mormon View	Universalist View
Those dying in childhood	Eternal life	Eternal life	Eternal Life
Those with faith in Jesus at death	Eternal life	Eternal life	Eternal life
Those with without knowledge of Jesus or the Gospel	Mixed views: from "no salvation" to "possible salvation for some."	Eternal life	Eternal life
Those who are taught about Jesus but die in sin	Condemned to Hell	Condemned to Hell	Eternal life
Those who deny the Holy Ghost	Condemned to Hell	Condemned to Hell	Eternal life

Notably, the Book of Mormon sided with Universalists with regard to the salvation of those who never had a chance to hear of Jesus.

=== Nephi ===
==== Restorationists vs. Ultra-Universalists ====
Universalists disagreed on whether there would be punishment after death before ultimate salvation. Restorationists believed there would be a time of suffering after death, while ultra-Universalists believed there was no suffering after death. In the Book of Mormon, Nephi's older brothers also wonder if punishment will happen during mortal life and ask him if hell is "the torment of the body in the days of probation, or doth it mean the final state of the soul after the death of the temporal body?" Nephi's answer is in line with the early-nineteenth-century anti-Universalists:

There is a place prepared, yea, even that awful hell of which I have spoken, and the Devil is the preparator [sic?] of it; wherefore the final state of the souls of men is to dwell in the kingdom of God, or to be cast out because of that justice of which I have spoken."

==== "Eat, drink, and be merry" ====
Because Universalists believed that all humans would be saved regardless of their beliefs or deeds during life, they were often painted by anti-Universalists as leading to Epicureanism, reasoning that if a person believed God would forgive any sin, then any sin would be allowed. For example, minister John Devotion wrote in 1801:

If there is no future judgment, they are certainly excusable who say, "Let us eat and drink, for to morrow we die". To suppose the future judgment is not a final and unalterable determination of our future state, opens the door to all manner of licentiousness in this life. That the punishment of the wicked will not be eternal, is ... believed by some at this day, to the destruction of vital piety and the morals of them who receive it.

The Book of Mormon prophet Nephi is recounted as teaching that, when the Book of Mormon was revealed to the world during a time when heresy was rampant, God would justify sin and still save his people. Nephi condemned both the ultra-universalist and restorationist doctrines, writing:

The Book of Mormon prophet Nephi is recounted teaching that, when the Book of Mormon was revealed to the world during a time when a heresy was rampant, God would justify sin and still save his people. Nephi thus condemns both the ultra-Universalist and Restorationist doctrines of early-nineteenth-century America, writing:

Yea, and there shall be many which shall say: "Eat, drink, and be merry, for tomorrow we die; and it shall be well with us". And there shall also be many which shall say: "Eat, drink, and be merry; nevertheless, fear God—he will justify in committing a little sin; yea, lie a little, take the advantage of one because of his words, dig a pit for thy neighbor; there is no harm in this; and do all these things, for tomorrow we die; and if it so be that we are guilty, God will beat us with a few stripes, and at last we shall be saved in the kingdom of God".

The Book of Mormon uses the lexicon and imagery of the New Testament parable of the Faithful Servant. In the parable, a wicked servant begins to "eat, drink and be drunken" after his master's return home is delayed. When the master finally arrives home, the wicked servants are "beaten with many stripes", while those who ignorantly sinned are "beaten with few stripes". The parable was used as a proof text for Restorationist Universalists, arguing that God punishing souls with many and few "stripes" implied an eventual end to punishment. For example, Universalist Elhanan Winchester wrote, "The very idea of many and few stripes, supposes limited punishments: for how can those stripes be said to be few, which shall continue [eternally] while God exists?"

=== Nehor and Amlici ===
A common argument against Universalism was that it led to spiritual decay, greed, subversion and debauchery. The Book of Mormon story of Nehor supported this idea. Wells argues that the story of Nehor is a literary tactic used to denigrate Universalists—one that Universalists themselves would have objected to as a misrepresentation.

In the Book of Mormon, a man named Nehor created a movement that promoted universal salvation around 91 BCE. Early Latter-day Saints explicitly tied the doctrine of Nehor to the Universalism of the 1830s. The Book of Mormon recounts that Nehor taught that "all mankind should be saved at the last day, and that they need not fear nor tremble, but that they might lift up their hands and rejoice; for the Lord had created all men, and had also redeemed all men; and, in the end, all men should have eternal life." After losing a theological argument with another prophet, Nehor became angry and killed the prophet. Nehor was condemned to death, but before he was hanged from a hill, he "acknowledged between the heavens and the earth, that what he had taught to the people was contrary to the word of God; and there he suffered ignominious death".

Nehor's teaching of universal salvation became popular among a Book of Mormon tribe called the Nephites, and the prophet Alma the Younger spent his ministry decrying the doctrine. Those ascribing to the "Order of the Nehors" were only kept from stealing and killing because of the punishment of the law. The idea that Universalists were prone to murder was a common stereotype that reached a peak in the 1820s.

Shortly afterward in the narrative, a man called Amlici, who followed the Order of Nehor, tried to become king and led an army against the main body of Nephites. After being defeated, Mormon writes about the aftermath in anti-Universalist tones:

in one year were thousands and tens of thousands of souls sent to the eternal world, that they might reap their rewards according to their works, whether they were good or whether they were bad, to reap eternal happiness or eternal misery, according to the spirit which they listed to obey, whether it be a good spirit or a bad one.

=== Ammonihah ===
In about 83 BCE, the prophet Alma went and preached in a city of Ammonihah, whose people followed the teachings of Nehor. A lawyer named Zeezrom debates Alma and his friend Amulek using a Universalist line of questioning. Zeezrom asks Amulek, "Shall [the Son of God] save his people in their sins?" Amulek answers, "The Lord surely shall come to redeem his people; but he should not come to redeem them in their sins, but to redeem them from their sins." Zeezrom turns to the people and says, "[Amulek] saith that the Son of God shall come, but he shall not save his people—as though he had authority to command God." Amulek accuses Zeezrom of misrepresenting his words and clarifies, "I say unto you again that he cannot save them in their sins; for I cannot deny his word, and he hath said that no unclean thing can inherit the kingdom of heaven; therefore, how can ye be saved, except ye inherit the kingdom of heaven? Therefore, ye cannot be saved in your sins." Alma and Amulek continue by expounding the doctrine that only those that believe and follow Jesus will be redeemed.

Some Universalists in the 1800s used Matthew 1:21 to prove Universalism, which reads, "And she shall bring forth a son, and thou shalt call his name JESUS: for he shall save his people from their sins. Universalist Elhanan Winchester wrote about this passage in 1800: "all men are certainly the people of Jesus, ... consequently he shall save all mankind from their sins." Orthodox Anti-Universalists rejected Winchester's interpretation, including a preacher, Charles Marford, who preached 10 miles from the Smith family home in Manchester, New York, and echoed a common rebuttal in 1819: "Christ is a Savior, to save his people from their sins, and not in them, and those that think otherwise will be overthrown."

Alma uses a line of reasoning in his rebuke of Zeezrom's Universalism: "whosoever dieth in his sins, as to a temporal death, shall also die a spiritual death; yea, he shall die as to things pertaining unto righteousness. Then is the time when their torments shall be as a lake of fire and brimstone, whose flame ascendeth up forever and ever".

This mirrors anti-Universalist rhetoric of the 1820s and 1830s. To establish that there was an actual place of punishment for sin after death, anti-Universalists would use John 8:21 as a proof text against Universalists, which says, "I go my way, and ye shall seek me, and shall die in your sins: whither I go, ye cannot come" and also the Book of Revelation, which discusses a "lake of fire and brimstone".

Not fearing punishment for sin because of their Universalist beliefs, the people of Ammonihah burn alive the converts of Alma and Amulek. Alma and Amulek are imprisoned and are asked by the leaders of Ammonihah, who are followers of Nehor, "After what ye have seen will ye preach again unto this people that they shall be cast into a lake of fire and brimstone?" and "How shall we look when we are damned?" Eventually, Alma and Amulek were miraculously saved. The narrator Mormon writes that the people of Ammonihah did not repent but continued to be "of the profession of Nehor, and did not believe in the repentance of sins." The city is eventually destroyed, as prophesied by Alma.

=== Zoramites ===
In 74 BCE, Alma and Amulek preached to a wicked group of people called the Zoramites. While the Book of Mormon does not label the Zoramites as Universalists, Alma and Amulek preach several sermons that used anti-Universalist arguments.

==== Atonement ====
The satisfaction theory of atonement was a medieval theological development, created to explain how God could be both merciful and just through an infinite atonement. Ultra-Universalists felt an infinite atonement was unnecessary since sin itself is not infinite. Orthodox religions condemned this way of thinking, arguing that "the necessity of an infinite atonement made by the death and suffering of Jesus Christ ... goes to overturn the whole system of the gospel."

In Alma and Amulek's sermons, they elucidate the satisfaction theory of atonement, saying, "There must be an atonement made, or else all mankind must unavoidably perish; ... therefore there can be nothing which is short of an infinite atonement which will suffice for the sins of the world. Therefore, it is expedient that there should be a great and last sacrifice; ... and that great and last sacrifice will be the Son of God, yea, infinite and eternal. And thus mercy can satisfy the demands of justice."

==== Soul after death ====
Ultra-Universalists believed that the sin and evil of man's soul did not extend after his death. Orthodox religions disputed this doctrine. For example, Methodist Luther Lee wrote, "The scriptures teach that men will possess the same moral character in a future state, with which they leave this. ... If sin attached itself to the body only, it might be contended that it dies with the body; but having its seat in the soul, it will live with it when the body dies." Amulek also condemns this doctrine, telling the Zoramites:

For after this day of life, which is given us to prepare for eternity, behold, if we do not improve our time while in this life, then cometh the night of darkness wherein there can be no labor performed ... for that same spirit which doth possess your bodies at the time that ye go out of this life, that same spirit will have power to possess your body in that eternal world. For behold, if ye have procrastinated the day of your repentance even until death, behold, ye have become subjected to the spirit of the devil, and he doth seal you his; therefore, the Spirit of the Lord hath withdrawn from you, and hath no place in you, and the devil hath all power over you; and this is the final state of the wicked.

=== Corianton ===
Around 73 BCE, Alma gave final lessons to his son Corianton, where he refutes universal salvation. Corianton had come to believe in universal salvation, and justified himself in committing what Alma said was a serious sin. Alma urges Corianton, "my son, do not risk one more offense against your God upon those points of doctrine, which ye have hitherto risked to commit sin."

Of particular concern to Corianton is "the justice of God in the punishment of the sinner ... that it is injustice that the sinner should be consigned to a state of misery." This was a similar question that Universalists would ask to support universal salvation. Representative of this was the Universalist Magazine in 1818, which similarly asked, "How is it possible that a being of infinite goodness should design a rational creature of his own production for a state of endless misery?"

Throughout Alma's talk with Corianton, he deconstructs Universalist claims. He teaches Corianton about an infinite atonement that will save only the repentant, and he corrects his son's false doctrine by teaching that this life is a "probationary time, a time to repent and serve God." Alma says that, contrary to universal salvation, after death, "the spirits of those who are righteous are received into a state of happiness, which is called paradise ... the spirits of the wicked ... shall be cast out into outer darkness." He tells Corianton that denying the Holy Ghost is an "unpardonable sin", and that "an awful death cometh upon the wicked ... for they are unclean, and no unclean thing can inherit the kingdom of God."

This was in line with orthodox responses to Universalism. For example, Pastor John Cleaveland similarly argued against universal salvation in 1776, saying, "The time of life here on earth is our only probation time for eternity. ... after death, they that are filthy will be filthy still; and they that are holy will be holy still. While our bodies are in the grave our souls will be in a fixed state of happiness or misery, according to the state we were in when we gave up the ghost; if in Christ, of happiness; if out of Christ—of misery and after the resurrection and final judgment the wicked will be in a state of punishment in soul and body forever and ever."

In a debate with a Universalist in 1832, Orson Hyde explicitly called Corianton a Universalist and used Alma's lessons as arguments.

=== Mormon ===
The Book of Mormon prophet Mormon discusses universal salvation in the Book of Helaman:

I would that all men might be saved. But we read that in the great and last day there are some who shall be cast out, yea, who shall be cast off from the presence of the Lord; Yea, who shall be consigned to a state of endless misery, fulfilling the words which say: They that have done good shall have everlasting life; and they that have done evil shall have everlasting damnation. And thus it is. Amen.

Mormon later prophesied about heresies that would exist in the time the Book of Mormon would be translated, and included the doctrine of universal salvation, saying, "There shall be many who will say, Do this, or do that, and it mattereth not, for the Lord will uphold such at the last day. But wo [sic?] unto such, for they are in the gall of bitterness and in the bonds of iniquity."

=== Viewpoints of The Church of Jesus Christ of Latter-day Saints ===
The existence of 19th-century anti-Universalist arguments and rhetoric in the Book of Mormon has been pointed out as anachronistic by various scholars, including Fawn M. Brodie and Dan Vogel. Scholars from the Church of Jesus Christ of Latter-day Saints (LDS Church) reject the anachronism.

LDS Church scholar Terryl Givens argues that because Book of Mormon prophets were shown the modern era by Jesus Christ, and the audience of the Book of Mormon was people in the modern era, Book of Mormon prophets would have been intimately familiar with anti-Universalist rhetoric and purposefully used it to convince modern-day readers. In Givens's view, the existence of anti-Universalist rhetoric validates ancient prophets' prophetic abilities. Similarly, LDS Church scholar Casey Paul Griffiths wrote, "If Mormon and Moroni saw our day, as they claimed, wouldn't we have expected them to write on topics related not only to us but to those of Joseph Smith's day? As one of the burning issues of the day, if the book did not deal with Universalism, it wouldn't be fulfilling its promises."

== Universalism and Joseph Smith revelations ==
In contrast to the Book of Mormon's anti-Universalist doctrine, later revelations by Smith took a more Universalist view of who would be saved. Historian Richard Lyman Bushman wrote of the shift, "Contradictory as they sound, the universalist tendencies of the revelations and the anti-universalism of the Book of Mormon defined a middle ground where there were graded rewards in the afterlife, but few were damned."

=== Revelation for Martin Harris ===
In the summer of 1829, within months of the Book of Mormon's translation, Joseph Smith received a revelation directed to Martin Harris, his early benefactor who had become hesitant about paying for the printing of the Book of Mormon. Harris had been a believer in Universalism, and had apparently had questions about Universalist doctrine.

In the debates between Universalists and anti-Universalists, the anti-Universalists would point to words like "eternal damnation" in the scriptures to argue that there was no end to suffering. Restorationist Universalists argued that such phrases did not actually mean never-ending, but were intended to scare humans into being righteous.

The revelation to Smith enters the debate siding with the Restorationist Universalists. In it, the phrases "eternal damnation" and "endless torment" are used in the scriptures to "work upon the hearts of the children of men," and encourage humankind to be righteous through the threat of unending punishment. The revelation divulges a mystery it says are known to only a few, that the words "Eternal" and "Endless" are names for God, so when the scriptures use phrases like endless torment or eternal damnation, they do not refer to a period of time that does not end, but to "God's punishment". According to the revelation, Harris is commanded by God to "show not these things unto the world until it is wisdom in me. For they cannot bear meat now, but milk they must receive; wherefore they must not know these, lest they perish."

=== Revelation to six Elders ===
In September 1830, Smith received a revelation for six elders in response to what was apparently a thoroughly Restorationist belief that had begun to be taught by some in the young Church. The revelation makes clear that there will be suffering that does not end for some:

And the righteous shall be gathered on my right hand unto eternal life; and the wicked on my left hand will I be ashamed to own before the Father; Wherefore I will say unto them—Depart from me, ye cursed, into everlasting fire, prepared for the devil and his angels. And now, behold, I say unto you, never at any time have I declared from mine own mouth that they should return, for where I am they cannot come, for they have no power.

=== The Vision ===
On February 16, 1832, Joseph Smith and Sidney Rigdon announced they had received a revelation from God outlining the "important points touching the salvation of man." According to the revelation, all humanity will be saved in one of three degrees of glory, except for a small number who commit the unpardonable sin who will be banished to outer darkness. This revelation became known as "the Vision".

Many converts to the early church disagreed with Universalism and felt the Book of Mormon justified their views. When news of "the Vision" reached the branches of the church, it was not well received by all and seen by many as a major shift in theology towards Universalism. An antagonistic newspaper wrote that with "the Vision", Joseph Smith had tried to "disgrace Universalism by professing ... the salvation of all men."

The branch in Geneseo, New York, was particularly apprehensive. Ezra Landon, a leader of the Geneseo branch who had convinced a number of others against the Vision, told visiting missionaries that "the vision was of the Devil & he believed it no more than he believed the devil was crucified ... & that he Br Landing would not have the vision taught in the church for $1000." Joseph Smith sent a letter to the branch making clear that disbelief in the Vision was an excommunicable offense, and after refusing to change his position, Landon was excommunicated.

Brigham Young said,

It was a great trial to many, and some apostatized because God was not going to send to everlasting punishment heathens and infants, but had a place of salvation, in due time, for all, and would bless the honest and virtuous and truthful, whether they ever belonged to any church or not. It was a new doctrine to this generation, and many stumbled at it. ... My traditions were such, that when the Vision came first to me, it was directly contrary and opposed to my former education. I said, Wait a little. I did not reject it; but I could not understand it.

Joseph Young, Brigham's brother, said, "I could not believe it at first. Why the Lord was going to save every body."

"The Vision" was not published until five months after it was received, and after the first two years, it was rarely mentioned in the 1830s or early 1840s. After the tepid reception of "the Vision", Joseph Smith gave instruction to missionaries to "remain silent" about it, until prospective converts had first believed the basic principles.

== Later views on Universalism ==
Starting around 1842, Joseph Smith and others appeared to be more open to being viewed as Universalist. Smith said in a speech in 1844, "I have no fear of hell fire, that doesn't exist, but the torment and disappointment of the mind of man is as exquisite as a lake burning with fire and brimstone."

Speaking of the resurrection, apostle Parley P. Pratt said, "This salvation being universal, I am a universalist in this respect,—this salvation being a universal restoration from the fall."

In a sermon, Brigham Young read the contents of "the Vision" and then commented, "His plans are to gather up, and bring together, and save all the inhabitants of the earth, with the exception of those who have received the Holy Ghost, and sinned against it. With this exception, all the world besides shall be saved.—Is not this Universalism? It borders very close upon it."

In 1980, LDS Church apostle Bruce R. McConkie used an anti-Universalist argument when discussing what he said was a heresy that leads to Universalism: that progression was possible between the three different levels of heaven. Speaking of the heresy, he said, "This belief lulls men into a state of carnal security. It causes them to say, 'God is so merciful; surely he will save us all eventually; if we do not gain the celestial kingdom now, eventually we will; so why worry?' It lets people live a life of sin here and now with the hope that they will be saved eventually."

Researcher Brian D. Birch has called the LDS Church views on salvation "soft universalism", because although the vast majority will be saved, a few will not. Also, the LDS Church doctrine makes a distinction between salvation from sin and exaltation, which is attaining the highest heaven and progressing eternally into godhood.

== See also ==
- Plan of salvation
- Son of perdition (Mormonism)
