= Spirit world (Latter Day Saints) =

In LDS theology, the realm where the spirits of the dead await the resurrection

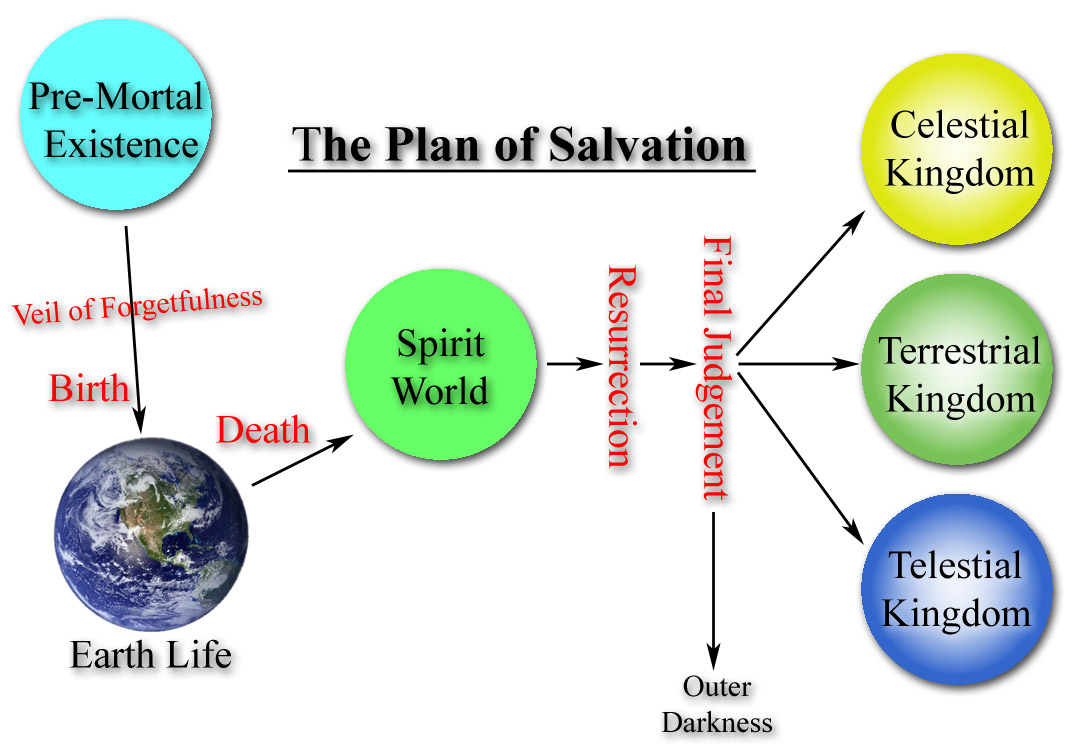
The Plan of Salvation, as illustrated by some within the Church of Jesus Christ of Latter-day Saints (not doctrinal)

In Mormonism, the term spirit world refers to the realm where the spirits of the dead await the resurrection. In LDS thought, this spirit world is divided into at least two conditions: Paradise and spirit prison:

Paradise includes "the spirits of the just, who had been faithful in the testimony of Jesus while they lived in mortality."

Spirit prison is the condition of the spirits of "the wicked ... the ungodly and the unrepentant who had defiled themselves while in the flesh ... the rebellious who rejected the testimonies and the warnings of the ancient prophets". The latter will continue to receive instruction in the Gospel and be allowed to repent, though their disposition toward repentance will only change as they recognize and accept the Gospel as true and develop faith in Jesus.

== Paradise ==
The spirit world is believed to be a place of continued spiritual growth for all spirits who embrace the teachings of Jesus. The LDS Church declares that Jesus organized this teaching process between his crucifixion and resurrection in the company of those who had followed him so that they could teach those who had not heard his message after his death.

Brigham Young stated,

Where is the spirit world? It is right here ... Do [spirits of the departed] go beyond the boundaries of the organized earth? No, they do not ... Can you see it with your natural eyes? No. Can you see spirits in this room? No. Suppose the Lord should touch your eyes that you might see, could you then see the spirits? Yes, as plainly as you now see bodies.

Joseph Smith taught:

The spirits of the just ... are not far from us, and know and understand our thoughts, feelings, and emotions, and are often pained therewith.

== Spirit prison ==
Latter-day Saints conceptualize the spirit prison as both a literal location and a condition experienced by souls between death and resurrection. This state pertains to individuals who have not received knowledge of the Gospel of Jesus or those who have been taught it but chosen to reject it. The spirit prison is regarded as a temporary state within the spirit world. Individuals who have rejected the Gospel after it has been presented to them may experience a condition referred to as Hell. The suffering associated with the spirit prison refers to the anguish of the soul because of acute knowledge of one's sins and unclean state.

Latter-day Saints believe that spirit prison (a name based on the phrase "the spirits in prison" in the KJV translation of 1 Peter 3:19) is a place in the post-mortal spirit world for those who have "died in their sins, without a knowledge of the truth, or in transgression, having rejected the prophets". This is a temporary state in which spirits will be taught the Gospel and have the opportunity to repent and accept ordinances of salvation that are performed for them in temples. Those who accept the Gospel may dwell in Paradise until the resurrection. Those who choose not to repent but who are not sons of perdition will remain in spirit prison until the end of the Millennium, when they will be freed from Hell and punishment and be resurrected to a telestial kingdom.

== Outer darkness ==
In the teachings of the Church of Jesus Christ of Latter-day Saints (LDS Church), "outer darkness" has two separate meanings.

=== Temporary abode of the wicked ===
First, LDS Church scripture uses the term outer darkness to refer to a condition in the spirit world. The Book of Mormon teaches that after death, the spirits of those who "chose evil works rather than good" in mortality will be "cast out into outer darkness". This is considered to be a condition of great torment, where there will be "weeping, and wailing, and gnashing of teeth". In this sense, outer darkness and spirit paradise are the two possible destinations for individuals immediately after death. This place of torment in the spirit world is much more commonly referred to by modern Latter-day Saints as spirit prison.

=== Popular use: permanent abode of sons of perdition ===
Second, in modern Latter-day Saint vernacular, outer darkness usually refers to an eternal state of punishment. Mortals who during their lifetime become sons of perdition—those who commit the unpardonable sin—will be consigned to outer darkness. It is taught that the unpardonable sin is committed by those who "den[y] the Son after the Father has revealed him". However, according to Mormon faith, since most humans lack such an extent of religious enlightenment, they cannot commit the Eternal sin, and the vast majority of residents of outer darkness will be the "devil and his angels ... the third part of the hosts of heaven" who in the pre-existence followed Lucifer and never received a mortal body. The residents of outer darkness who received a mortal body, while being resurrected like the rest of mankind, are the only children of God that will not receive one of three kingdoms of glory at the Last Judgment, remaining in that state of suffering for their own sins, for eternity. This state shares some similarities with certain Christian views of hell. On this subject, Joseph Smith taught that those who commit the unpardonable sin are "doomed to Gnolaum—to dwell in hell, worlds without end." The word gnolaum is used elsewhere by Smith to mean "eternal" (in the sense of 'everlasting' or 'forever' with perpetuity in time, and likely not "eternal" as 'outside of time' or having no relationship with the temporality). It is believed by Latter-day Saints that "few" people who have lived on the earth will be consigned to this state, but Latter-day Saint scripture suggests that at least Cain will be present.

=== Meaning ===
It is unclear in the teachings of Mormonism whether both the temporary and permanent uses of outer darkness refer to physical places or if both are merely descriptions of personal states of suffering and torment. The uncanonized LDS Church Bible Dictionary suggests that biblical "expressions about 'hell-fire' are probably ... figurative of the torment of those who willfully disobey God." It is also unclear whether sons of perdition will ultimately be redeemed; of outer darkness and the sons of perdition, Latter-day Saint scripture states that "the end thereof, neither the place thereof, nor their torment, no man knows; Neither was it revealed, neither is, neither will be revealed unto man, except to them who are made partakers thereof."

== See also ==
- Baptism for the dead
- Fate of the unlearned#Latter-day Saint tradition
- Intermediate state, a non-LDS term for the period between death and resurrection in Christian eschatology
- Paradise, for non-LDS usage of the term
- Spirit body
- Temple (LDS Church)
- Universalism and the Latter Day Saint movement
