= Sons of Perdition =

Sons of Perdition may refer to

- Sons of perdition (Mormonism), a phrase used to describe those in Mormon beliefs who follow Satan and receive no glory in the afterlife
- Sons of Perdition (film), a 2010 documentary about teenagers exiled from the Fundamentalist Church of Jesus Christ of Latter Day Saints

== See also ==
- Son of perdition, a phrase used in the New Testament, usually interpreted as a description of Judas Iscariot
