= Armchair Cinema =

British TV anthology series (1974–1975)

- DVD cover
- Country of origin: United Kingdom
- Original language: English
- No. of series: 1
- No. of episodes: 6

Production
- Production companies: Euston Films; Thames Television

Original release
- Network: ITV
- Release: 28 May 1974 – 26 November 1975

Related
- Armchair Mystery Theatre; Out of This World; Armchair Theatre; Armchair Thriller

Armchair Cinema is a British television drama anthology series of one-off plays that ran on the ITV network 1974–1975. It was produced by Euston Films in conjunction with Thames Television. The series was a spin-off from the long running anthology series Armchair Theatre. A total of six episodes were produced over the course of one series.

== Background ==
In 1971, Euston Films was established as a production company by three Thames executives Lloyd Shirley, George Taylor and Brian Tesler. It operated as a subsidiary of Thames Television until is dissolution in 1994. At the time, television drama was primarily a mix of studio based videotape and exteriors shot on 16mm film or outside broadcast videotape. They acknowledged that productions could be shot quicker and more economically by filming them entirely on 16mm film stock. The inspiration for Euston Films came from writer Trevor Preston, along with directors Jim Goddard and Tim Green whom were working at ABC Television, when in 1965 they detailed a proposal for a specialist production unit that would shoot dramas entirely on film. Following the establishment of Thames Television in 1968, this style of production was trialed with two one-off dramas "Suspect" (1969) and "Rumour" (1970) which were promoted under the ITV Playhouse strand, along with the children's series The Tyrant King. This subsequently led to the initiation of Euston Films as a production unit for Thames.

At the time Armchair Theatre, was increasingly being criticized as being an archaic reminder of television's theatrical roots. Following the success Thames had with their initial Euston Films project Special Branch which moved over to being shot entirely on film in 1973. Jeremy Issacs who was then Director of Programmes at Thames, was favourable about Euston Films work on the series and decided to commission them to revive the then ailing Armchair Theatre. The new series was pressed into production later that year.

== Influence ==
The series was notable for showcasing films by a number of writers including Ian Kennedy Martin, Guy Slater, John Kershaw and Ian Stuart Black. One of the films, Kennedy Martin's Regan, gained a favourable response from viewers, with over seven million tuning into the episode. As a result, it was commissioned into a full series, The Sweeney, that ran between 1975 and 1978, and also produced two spin-off feature films that were released in 1977 and 1978 respectively.

== Episodes ==
No. in series	Title	Writer	Director	Original release date
1	"The Prison"	Geoffrey Gilbert based on La Prison by Georges Simenon	David Wickes	28 May 1974
James Laurenson (Alain Poitaud), James Maxwell (Roland Blanchet), Ann Curthoys (Jacqueline Poitaud), Kenneth Griffith (Julien Bour), George Murcell (Maître Rabut), André Morell (Andre Fage), Diane Keen (Mina), Philip Madoc (Superintendent Roumagne), Peter Sallis (Benitet), Jon Laurimore (Boris Maleski), Nina Francis (Adrienne), John Scholes (Inspector Noble), Heather Barbour (Bessie), Joyce Heron (Mme Poitaud), Dominic Gilbert (Patrick Poitaud), Norman Henry (Oscar Poitaud), Anita Finch (Maud), Hal Jeayes (Usher), Johnny Shannon (Desk Sergeant), Mary Quinn (Mme Martin), Nancy Nevinson (Mme Jeanne).
2	"Regan"	Ian Kennedy Martin	Tom Clegg	4 June 1974
John Thaw (Detective Inspector Jack Regan), Dennis Waterman (Detective Sergeant George Carter), Lee Montague (Arthur Dale), Garfield Morgan (Detective Chief Inspector Frank Haskins), David Daker (Tusser), Janet Key (Kate), Maureen Lipman (Annie), Morris Perry (Detective Superintendent Maynon), Stephen Yardley (Detective Inspector Laker), Barry Jackson (Morton), Miquel Brown (Miriam), Peter Blythe (Peter), Carl Rigg (Detective Sergeant Kent), Michael da Costa (South), Ronald Pember (Landlord), Jonathan Elsom (Interviewer), Betty Woolfe (Mrs Berry), Seymour Matthews (Doctor), Don Henderson (Strip-Club Heavy), Nancy Gabrielle (Johno's Wife), Del Baker (Detective Sergeant Cowley).
3	"Sea Song"	Guy Slater	Peter Hammond	10 September 1974
Tom Bell (Ray Carter), Kika Markham (Marnie Miller), Phillipe Leotard (Jean Jacques Brialy), June Ritchie (Susan Carter), Rachel Thomas (Lil Carter), Angela Browne, Polly Adams (Anna), Ellen Pollock (Mathilde), André Charisse (Patron), Alex McIntosh (Commentator), Robert McBain (T.V. Director), Julie Crosthwait (Lyddy).
4	"When Day is Done"	John Kershaw	Reginald Collin	7 January 1975
Edward Woodward (Philip Warne), Rosemary Leach (Rosemary Warne), Julia Goodman (Judy Warne), Patricia Maynard (Sue Flack), Jeremy Hawk (Jimmy Fox), Jack Woolgar (Old Man), Beth Harris (Miss Egon), Margaret Anderson (Joan Scott), George Waring (Martin Abbott), Adrian Shergold (Dave Warne), Lucienne Kershaw (Jolly Warne), Eric McCaine (Landlord), Godfrey Jackman (Police Sergeant), Denis de Marne (Man in Pub), Colin Stepney (Labourer), Richard Steele (Local PC).
5	"In Sickness and in Health"	John Kershaw	Reginald Collin	21 May 1975
Patrick Mower (Doctor Ian Bell), Prunella Ransome (Kate Bell), Michael Goodliffe (Doctor David Murray), Shelagh Fraser (Mrs Heath), Bill Dean (Mr Jackson), Michael Sheard (Mr Turnish), Norman Beaton (Mr Byron), Andonia Katsaros (Sylvia), Timothy Carlton (Mr Ray), Petronella Barker (District Nurse), Jumoke Debayo (Midwife), Cecily Hobbs (Mrs Dean), Doris Rogers (Mrs Gunter), Alison Griffin (Bank Clerk), Christopher Asante (Passer-By), Susannah Sheard (Nita), Miles Proudfoot (Baby Roger).
6	"Tully"	Ian Stuart Black	James Gatward	26 November 1975
Anthony Valentine (Tully), Barbara Nielsen (Sylvia), Jack Thompson (Vic), Henri Szeps (Ted Eastman), Kevin Miles (Brandon), Les Foxcroft (Mr Fenner), Phillip Ross (Inspector Young), Zoe Salmon (Travel Clerk), Natalie Mosco (Kitty), John Stanton (Helier), Bob Hallet (Roy), Lyn James (Doris), Belinda Grose (Sally), Ted Hepple (Skimp), Michael Aitkens (Barman), Ray Marshall (Minter), Peter Berg (Fence), Martin Phelan (Foxy), Frankie Davidson (Bruce), Bill Redmond (Sharples), Noeline Brown (Valerie), Ken Goodlet (Australian Inspector), Richard Gilbert (Swagman), Tony Barry (Mack), Bruno Lawrence (Bert), Robert Hughes (Tully's Lookout), Rebecca Gilling (Australian Secretary), Ruth Ardler (Aboriginal Lady).

== Home media ==
"Regan", the pilot episode for The Sweeney, was released as a stand-alone DVD, on 12 September 2005 by Network. The complete series of Armchair Cinema was subsequently released on DVD, on 31 August 2009 by Network, along with the television films "Suspect" (1969), "Rumour" (1970), "The Sailor's Return" (1978) and "Charlie Muffin" (1979).
