= Sons of Perdition (film) =

2010 American documentary film

- Directed by: Tyler Measom, Jennilyn Merten
- Produced by: Julie Golden; Tyler Measom; Jennilyn Merten
- Starring: Sam Zitting, Joe Broadbent, Bruce Barlow, Sam Brower, Jon Krakauer
- Edited by: Jenny Golden
- Music by: Mark Geary
- Release date: April 24, 2010
- Running time: 85 minutes
- Country: United States
- Language: English

Sons of Perdition is a 2010 documentary film featuring a behind-the-scenes look into the lives of teenagers exiled from their families and community by Warren Jeffs, self-proclaimed prophet of the Fundamentalist Church of Jesus Christ of Latter Day Saints (FLDS Church). Sons of Perdition premiered at the Tribeca Film Festival in New York City on April 24, 2010, having sold out at the box office within one hour from the time tickets went on sale.

== Background ==
"Sons of perdition" is a term used by some Latter Day Saint denominations, including the FLDS Church, to describe former members who have apostatized from their religion and faith. The term is derogatory and intended to convey unholiness, sin, and evil. Within the FLDS Church in the border towns of Colorado City, Arizona and Hildale, Utah, under the severe rule of convicted child molester Warren Jeffs, hundreds of teenage boys were exiled from their homes and families among the FLDS faithful for infractions such as wearing short-sleeved shirts, listening to music, or talking to girls. Whether forced out by church leadership or a deliberate choice to escape the harsh environment, the exiled teenage boys were shunned by their families and community. As a result of their limited education and lifelong insulation from the world outside of their polygamous community, these "lost boys" were ill-equipped to manage life on the outside of the church. Many of the boys turned to drugs or alcohol to cope with the traumatic separation; others found themselves in trouble with the law.

Directors Tyler Measom and Jennilynn Merten followed these Lost Boys for four years to bring to the film the personal perspective of the exiled boys. As described by one film reviewer:

Sons of Perdition's concentration on Joe, Bruce, and Sam—and, to a lesser extent, their exiled compatriots—is a shrewd one, allowing for a focused examination of the toll wrought by such an upbringing on teens undergoing the process of self-definition. Less a definitive historical account of American polygamy than a study of a very particular strain of post-traumatic stress disorder, Measom and Merten's doc is cautiously inspiring in its snapshot of independence blossoming amidst oppression, heartbreaking in its empathetic portrayal of lost young men permanently scarred by their elders, and infuriating in its clear-sighted depiction of the criminal and emotional horrors perpetrated in the service of religious psychosis.

Measom and Merten found the subject matter appealing in part because of their own experience of having abandoned the Mormon faith they grew up in.

== Cast ==
The documentary features three teenage boys, Sam Zitting, Joseph Broadbent, and Bruce Barlow. At the time of filming, all three were living in St. George, Utah having left the dictates of Warren Jeffs and the FLDS Church, whose members resided in the Arizona–Utah twin cities of Colorado City and Hildale (known also as the Crick or Short Creek). The film also features Utah private investigator Sam Brower.

== Release ==
On April 24, 2010, Sons of Perdition made its debut at the Tribeca Film Festival premiere in New York.

At the 2010 AFI-Discovery SilverDocs Documentary Film Festival, Sons of Perdition was selected for the Sterling U.S. Feature Competition.

Sons of Perdition was acquired by the Oprah Winfrey Network and was broadcast in June 2011.

== See also ==
- Outer darkness
- Prophet's Prey
- Keep Sweet: Pray and Obey
