= Prison Song (disambiguation) =

Prison Song may refer to:

Films and television

- Prison Song (film), a 2001 American film

Music

- Prison rock, a musical subgenre of Chinese rock 'n' roll
- "Prison Song", a song by Graham Nash from the album Wild Tales
- "Prison Song", a song by System of a Down from the album Toxicity

== See also ==
- Category:Songs about prison
