= Degrees of glory =

Mormon afterlife concept

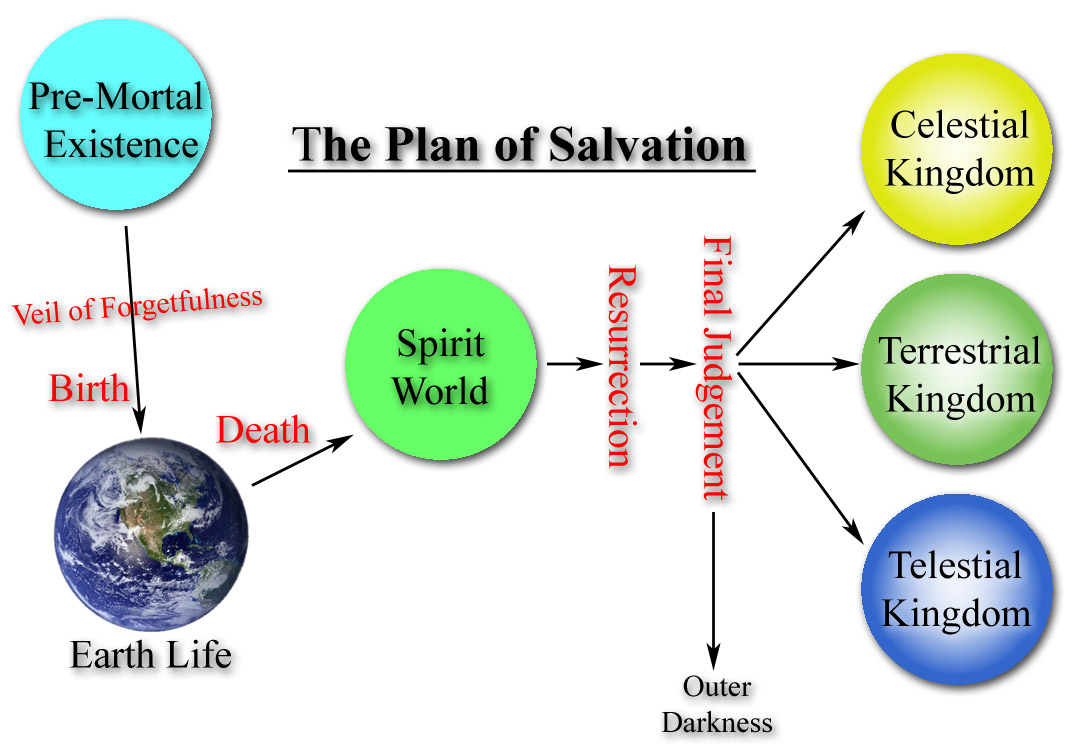
A depiction of the Plan of Salvation, as illustrated by a source within the Church of Jesus Christ of Latter-day Saints

In the theology and cosmology of Mormonism, in heaven there are three degrees of glory (alternatively, kingdoms of glory) which are the ultimate, eternal dwelling places for nearly all who have lived on earth after they are resurrected from the spirit world.

Members of the largest denomination in the Latter Day Saint movement, the Church of Jesus Christ of Latter-day Saints (LDS Church) believe that the apostle Paul briefly described these degrees of glory in heaven in 1 Corinthians 15:40-42, and in 2 Corinthians 12:2. Joseph Smith said he received a vision with Sidney Rigdon in 1832 which enhances the understanding of heaven and is recorded in Doctrine and Covenants (D&C) Section 76. According to this vision, all people will be resurrected and, at the Final Judgment, all who go to heaven will be assigned to one of three degrees of glory, called the celestial, terrestrial, and telestial kingdoms. All of the remaining, believed to be a small number of individuals who commit the unpardonable sin, will not receive a kingdom of glory in heaven, but will be banished to outer darkness with Satan where they will be "sons of Perdition".

== History ==
In April 1830, the Church of Christ was organized by Smith in upstate New York. By October of that year, the church had grown to between seventy and eighty disciples. That fall missionaries were sent west to convert the Native Americans in Missouri. They passed through Kirtland, Ohio, where they encountered widespread success among the congregations of Sidney Rigdon, adding hundreds of additional converts. Many of these members, including Rigdon, had formerly been members of the Disciples of Christ led by Alexander Campbell.

The doctrine of the new Church of Christ had not been completely developed or understood yet in Kirtland, especially with Joseph Smith in New York and missionaries having moved on to Missouri. As such, many early Kirtland converts retained Disciple of Christ doctrines and practices. Regarding the afterlife, Alexander Campbell published in 1828 a vision he had received of "three kingdoms" where he wrote: "While musing upon the three kingdoms, I fancied myself in the kingdom of glory after the final judgment." He went on to explain that heaven was divided into "the Kingdom of Law, the Kingdom of Favor, and the Kingdom of Glory" where the deceased would enter based on levels of faith, works, and Abrahamic lineage. Disciples of Christ also believed that most people would be numbered among the sinners sent to a "lake of fire and brimstone" outside of heaven.

In 1831, Smith and the Latter Day Saints in upstate New York migrated to what had become the center of church membership in Kirtland. Smith and Rigdon studied and prayed intensively together, and after comparing the Book of Mormon, the Bible, and Smith's earlier revelations, they concluded that "God rewarded everyone according to the deeds done in the body" and "the term 'Heaven,' as intended for the Saints' eternal home must include more kingdoms than one".

=== The Vision ===
On February 16, 1832, while working on translation of the New Testament passage John 5:29 in the upstairs bedroom of the John Johnson home, Smith and Rigdon received what was known to early Latter Day Saints as "the Vision". It detailed a heaven divided into three degrees of glory (the celestial, terrestrial, and telestial kingdoms), where resurrected beings would go after the final judgement.

Assignment to a particular kingdom in the resurrection is contingent upon the desires and actions exhibited during mortal and post-mortal life. Critically different from Disciple of Christ beliefs was that in Latter Day Saint theology, virtually all would be saved. The first misunderstanding that came from the vision, and persists in the church to this day, is that sinners would also be saved in heaven, a distinction that caused some to apostatize from the young church. The LDS Church teaches that these different kingdoms are what Jesus was referring to when he said "in my Father's house are many mansions" (John 14:2).; and that 1 Corinthians speaks of these three degrees of glory, comparing them with the glory of the sun, moon, and stars.

=== Response by early Latter Day Saints ===
Christian universalism, or the idea that God would save all of humanity, was a prominent and polarizing religious belief in the 1830s. Many converts to the early church disagreed with Universalism and felt the Book of Mormon justified their views. When news of "the Vision" reached the branches of the church, it was not well received by all and seen by many as a major shift in theology towards Universalism. An antagonistic newspaper wrote sarcastically that with "the Vision" Joseph Smith had tried to "disgrace Universalism by professing [...] the salvation of all men".

The branch in Geneseo, New York, was particularly apprehensive. Ezra Landon, a leader of the Geneseo branch who had convinced a number of others against the Vision, told visiting missionaries that "the vision was of the Devil & he believed it no more than he believed the devil was crucified [...] & that he, Br Landon, would not have the vision taught in the church for $1000". Joseph Smith sent a letter to the branch making clear that "disagreement with church doctrine, and particularly disbelief in JS's revelations, was grounds for excommunication". After refusing to change his position, Landon was excommunicated.

Brigham Young said:

It was a great trial to many, and some apostatized because God was not going to send to everlasting punishment heathens and infants, but had a place of salvation, in due time, for all, and would bless the honest and virtuous and truthful, whether they ever belonged to any church or not. It was a new doctrine to this generation, and many stumbled at it. [...] My traditions were such, that when the Vision came first to me, it was directly contrary and opposed to my former education. I said, Wait a little. I did not reject it; but I could not understand it.

Joseph Young, Brigham's brother, said: "I could not believe it at first. Why the Lord was going to save every body."

"The Vision" was not published until five months after it was received, and after the first two years was rarely mentioned in the 1830s or early 1840s. After the tepid reception of "the Vision", Joseph Smith gave instruction to missionaries to "remain silent" about it, until prospective converts had first believed the basic principles.

== Celestial kingdom ==
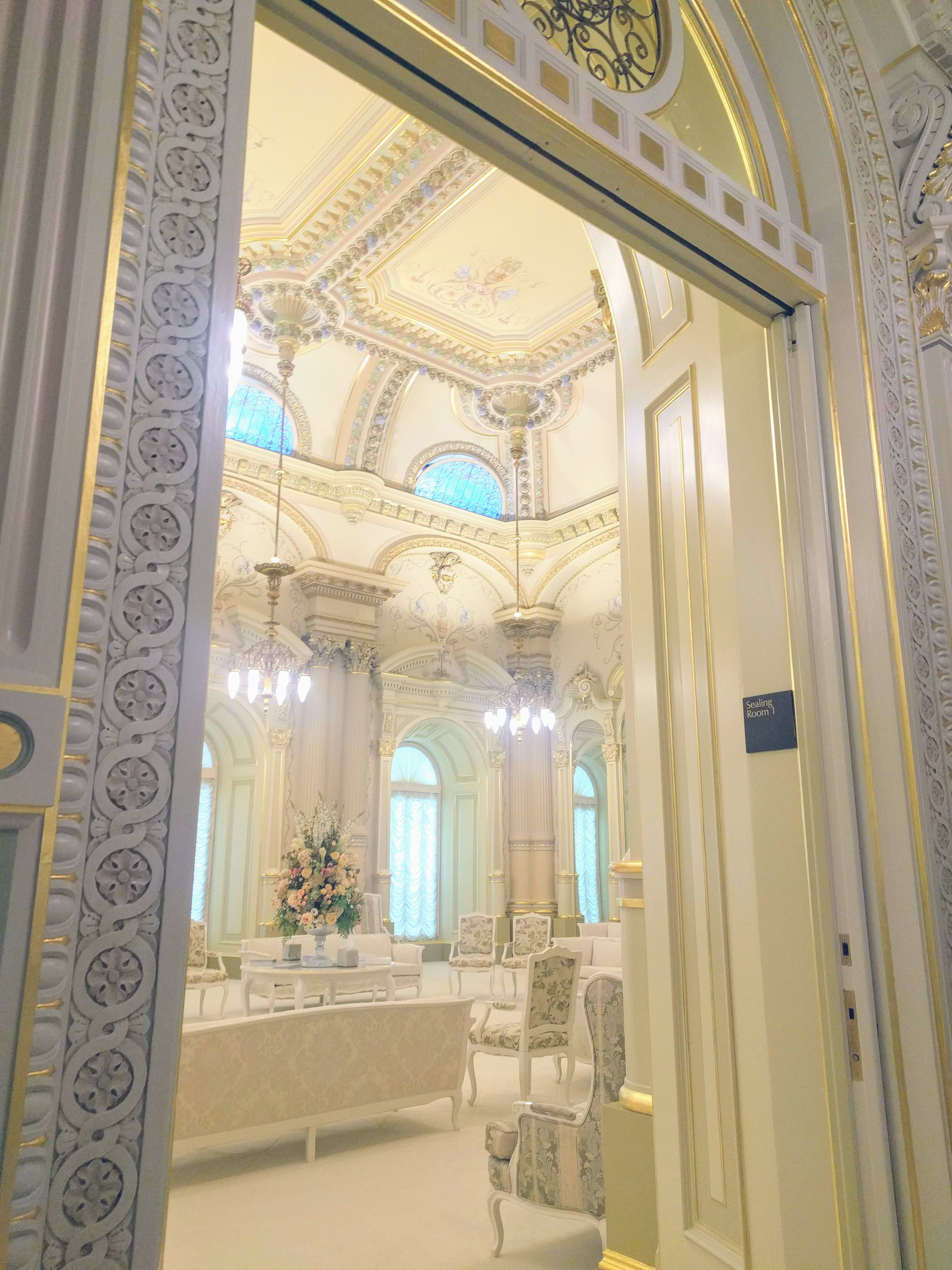
Celestial rooms in LDS temples represent the celestial kingdom

The celestial kingdom is taught as being the highest of the three degrees of glory. It is thought by the LDS Church to be the "third heaven" referred to by the apostle Paul in the King James Version of 2 Corinthians 12:2 and also the New Earth created for the righteous that is mentioned in Revelation 21. It is said to correspond to the "celestial bodies" and "glory of the sun" mentioned in 1 Corinthians 15:40–41. The word celestial derives from a Latin word meaning 'heavenly'.

=== Inhabitants ===
In Latter Day Saint theology, the celestial kingdom is the residence of those who have been righteous, accepted the teachings of Jesus Christ, and received and lived up to all of the required ordinances and covenants. Individuals may accept and receive these ordinances and covenants during their mortal lives. According to doctrine, those who did not have the opportunity while living will have the opportunity in the post-mortal spirit world, where they can accept ordinances performed on their behalf by LDS Church members in temples. All children who die before they become morally competent, which according to LDS belief typically happens around the age of 8, automatically inherit the celestial kingdom without the reception of ordinances. The celestial kingdom is the permanent residence of God the Father, Jesus Christ, and the Holy Ghost.

Joseph Smith taught that "a white stone is given to each of those who come into the celestial kingdom, whereon is a new name written, which no man knoweth save he that receiveth it". This white stone will become a Urim and Thummim (or seer stone) to the recipient.

=== Relation with celestial marriage ===
Smith taught that only those individuals who are sealed in celestial marriage to a spouse will be permitted to enter into the highest degree of celestial glory. These individuals will eventually become exalted It is believed that this cannot be fully comprehended in the world; rather, it is said that the learning and understanding of salvation and exaltation will occur even beyond the grave. Like other ordinances, the sealing to a spouse may occur during mortal life or may be accepted by the parties in the afterlife and performed by proxy in a temple.

=== Location ===
Smith also taught that the earth will also receive a celestial glory. Smith said that the earth, like the planet where God resides, will be "made like unto crystal and will be a Urim and Thummim to the inhabitants who dwell thereon".

== Terrestrial kingdom ==
The terrestrial kingdom is the middle of the three degrees of glory. It is believed by LDS Church members to correspond to the "bodies terrestrial" and "glory of the moon" mentioned by the apostle Paul in the King James Version translation of 1 Corinthians 15:40–41. The word terrestrial derives from a Latin word meaning 'earthly'.

=== Inhabitants ===
According to Doctrine and Covenants Section 76, those who will inhabit the terrestrial kingdom include those who have lived respectably but "were blinded by the craftiness of men" and thus rejected the fullness of the gospel of Jesus Christ when it was presented to them in this life. It also includes persons who rejected the "testimony of Jesus in the flesh, but afterwards received it" in the spirit world and those who "are not valiant in the testimony of Jesus" after having received it. For those who rejected the opportunity to receive required ordinances and covenants while living, they will have the opportunity in the postmortal spirit world, where they can accept ordinances performed on their behalf by LDS Church members in temples.

Ultimately, the kingdom of glory received by those who accept the testimony of Jesus will be based on God's knowledge of whether they "would have received it with all their hearts" as manifested by their works and the "desire of their hearts". Those who inherit the terrestrial kingdom "receive of the presence of the Son, but not the fulness [sic] of the Father". Smith taught that translated beings abide in the terrestrial kingdom until they are judged at the Final Judgment, after which they will enter into the celestial kingdom.

== Telestial kingdom ==
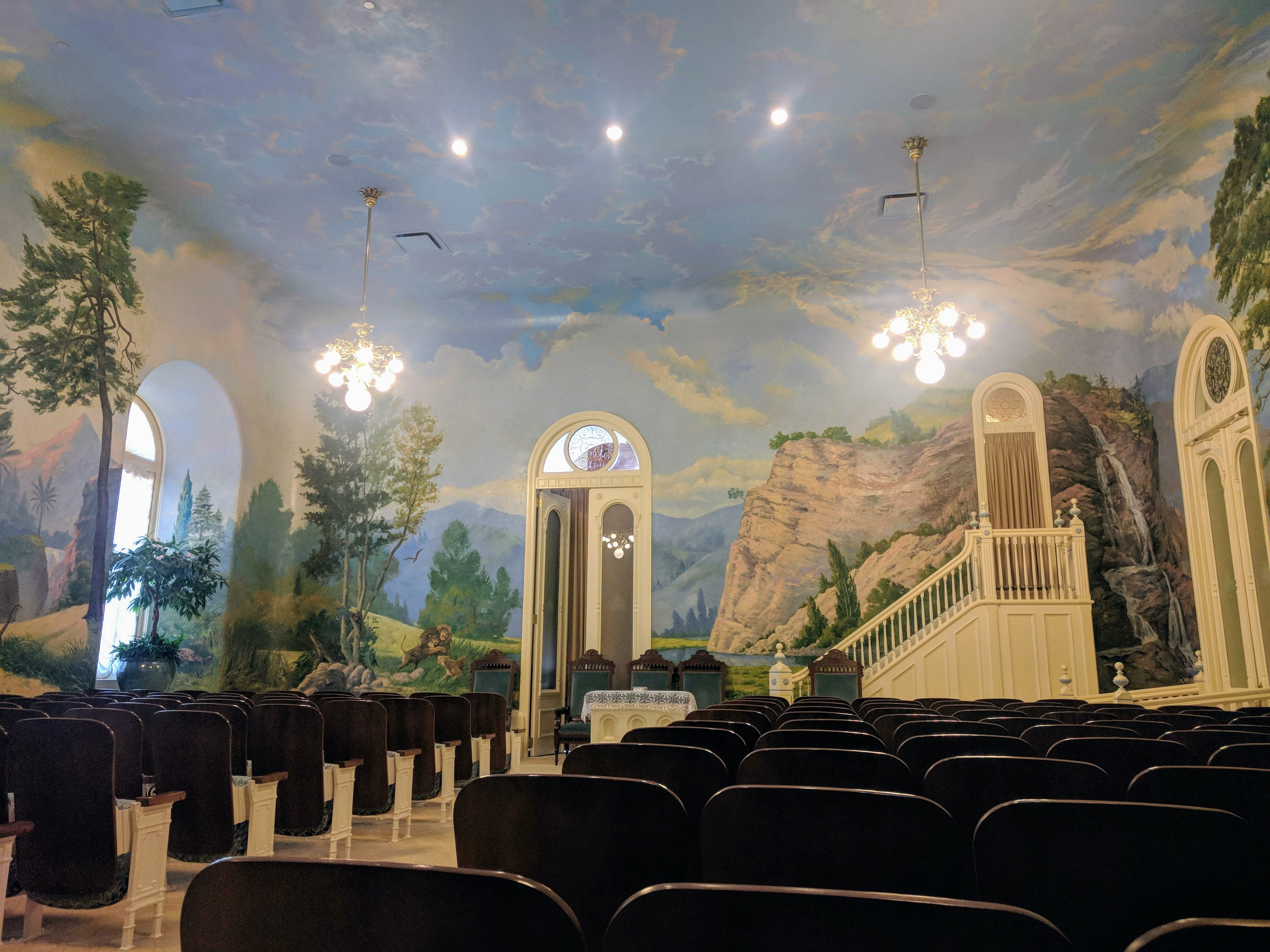
The telestial room of the Salt Lake Temple

The telestial kingdom is the lowest of the three degrees of glory. It is believed by LDS Church members to correspond to the "glory of the stars" mentioned by the apostle Paul in the King James Version translation of 1 Corinthians 15:41. Telestial is a term with no prior usage, and it was not made clear if the word was meant to be part of the vision or an invention by Smith or Rigdon. Historian Mark Staker points out that Rigdon had elementary experience with Latin and Greek, and that the word reflects the idea of being far off or reaching the end.

=== Inhabitants ===
According to the Doctrine and Covenants, those who will inhabit the telestial kingdom include those who, in this life, "received not the gospel of Christ, nor the testimony of Jesus". It will also include those who were "liars, and sorcerers, and adulterers, and whoremongers, and cloakers, and whosoever loves and makes a lie", as well as "murderers, and idolaters". Because of their refusal to accept Jesus as their Savior, these individuals will remain in spirit prison for 1,000 years during the millennial reign of Christ until they repent, and accept Jesus Christ and His gospel. These individuals will have the opportunity, during this time in the postmortal spirit world, to accept ordinances performed on their behalf by LDS Church members in temples. After the 1,000 years, the individuals will be resurrected and receive an immortal physical body and be assigned to the telestial kingdom.

Smith taught that individuals in the telestial kingdom will be servants of God, but "where God and Christ dwell they cannot come, worlds without end"; however, they will receive the ministration of the Holy Ghost and beings from the terrestrial kingdom. Despite these limitations, in LDS Church theology being resident in the telestial kingdom is not an unpleasant experience: "the glory of the telestial [...] surpasses all understanding."

Smith also taught that just as there are different degrees of glory within the celestial kingdom (D&C 131:1–4), there are different degrees of glory within the telestial kingdom. He stated that "as one star differs from another star in glory, even so differs one from another in the telestial world". In the telestial kingdom, each person's glory will vary depending on their works while on the earth.

Smith and Rigdon stated: "We saw the glory and the inhabitants of the telestial world, that they were as innumerable as the stars in the firmament of heaven, or as the sand upon the seashore." Bruce R. McConkie suggested that by implication this means that "most of the adult people who have lived from the day of Adam to the present time will go to the telestial kingdom".

== Role in temple ordinances ==
During the original endowment temple ordinance, church members moved between ordinance rooms that represented the three different kingdoms of glory. In newer LDS temples, the majority of the moves between rooms have been replaced with changes in lighting to represent changes from one degree of glory to the next. In some of the church's older temples (e.g., the Salt Lake, Idaho Falls Idaho, Manti Utah, and Cardston Alberta temples), the classic version of the endowment ceremony is still done by moving from room to room. Every LDS temple includes a celestial room—representing the celestial kingdom—that is separate from the other ordinance rooms.

== Hypothesized influence of Emanuel Swedenborg ==
Some, including Mormon historian D. Michael Quinn, have argued that various parts of the plan of salvation were influenced in part by Emanuel Swedenborg's book Heaven and Hell. In Heaven and Hell, Swedenborg wrote that "there are three heavens" that are "entirely distinct from each other". Swedenborg called the highest heaven "the Celestial Kingdom", although this was already a common term for heaven before Swedenborg's writings. He also stated that "The Lord is seen as a sun by those who are in His celestial kingdom, where love to Him reigns, and as a moon by those who are in His spiritual kingdom, where charity to the neighbor and faith reign".

Swedenborgian writings were spread widely in New England in the early 1800s by Swedenborgian missionaries. In 1839, Smith met with a recent Latter Day Saint convert from Swedenborgianism, Edward Hunter, and told him: "Emanuel Swedenborg had a view of the world to come, but for daily food he perished." Others, including Smith's biographer Richard Bushman have argued it is more likely that Smith and Swedenborg developed their ideas independently based on 1 Corinthians chapter 15 and 2 Corinthians 12:2.

== See also ==
- Christian views on hell § Latter Day Saints
- Empyrean
- Holy of Holies (LDS Church)
- Seven Heavens
