= The Prison (novel) =

1968 novel by Georges Simenon

- Author: Georges Simenon
- Original title: La Prison
- Language: French
- Genre: psychological novel
- Published: 1968
- Publication place: Belgium
- Media type: print

The Prison (French La prison) is a 1968 novel by Georges Simenon. The dur tale of a husband informed by the police that his wife has shot her sister, the novel takes similar themes to Simenon's domestic crisis novels Lettre à mon juge and La Main.
