= Outer darkness =

Place referred to in the Gospel of Matthew

In Christianity, the "exterior darkness" or "outer darkness" (Greek: τὸ σκότος τὸ ἐξώτερον, romanized: to skotos to exōteron) is a place referred to three times in the Gospel of Matthew (8:12, 22:13, and 25:30) into which a person may be "cast out", and where there is "weeping and gnashing of teeth". Generally, the outer darkness is thought to be hell; however, many Christians associate the outer darkness more generally as a place of separation from God or from the metaphorical "wedding banquet" that Jesus is expected to have upon his Second Coming.

== New Testament ==
The phrase first occurs in Jesus' comment concerning the faith of the Centurion of Capernaum:

And I say to thee that many shall come from the east and the west, and shall sit down with Abraham, and Isaac, and Jacob in the kingdom of heaven: But the children of the kingdom shall be cast out into the exterior darkness: there shall be weeping and gnashing of teeth.

— Matthew 8:11, D-R

The use of the term exterior darkness is in Jesus' parable of the wedding feast (also known as the parable of the marriage of the king's son). In this parable, a king arranged a wedding for his son, but the normal guests did not come; therefore, the king sent his servants to gather guests from off the street. One of these guests, however, appeared without the proper wedding attire. When the king asked, "Friend, how camest thou in hither not having a wedding garment?" the man was silent (Matt 22:12); therefore, the king said: "Bind him hand and foot, and cast him into the exterior darkness: there shall be weeping and gnashing of teeth. For many are called, but few are chosen." (Matt. 22:13-14, D-R.)

The third use occurs in the last line of parable of the talents: "And cast ye the unprofitable servant into outer darkness: there shall be weeping and gnashing of teeth" (Matthew 25:30).

== Interpretations ==
=== Protestantism ===
Both Luther, who taught soul sleep till the resurrection of the dead, and Calvin, who taught the immortal soul, considered the "outer darkness" references in Matthew to refer to the last judgment. Today, interpretation of these "outer darkness" verses are a subset of Protestant discussion on hell and annihilationism.

Other views include those of Zane C. Hodges who controversially suggested that it represents a place for those who make it to heaven based on their faith, but have failed to perform good works during their time on the earth.

=== Usage in the Latter Day Saint movement ===
In the Latter Day Saint movement, "outer darkness" can refer to hell (the place where the spirits of the wicked reside after death but before the resurrection) or to the place where the sons of perdition will reside. The latter meaning is a place where the Glory of God is completely absent, and is the place where Satan and his angels will reside. Latter Day Saint beliefs on hell are connected with the movement's doctrines of the plan of salvation, the degrees of glory and the telestial kingdom.

== See also ==
- Sons of Perdition, 2010 documentary
- Spirits in prison (1 Peter 3:19)
