= Son of perdition (Mormonism) =

Latter Day Saint term

In the Church of Jesus Christ of Latter-day Saints (LDS Church), a son of perdition is a person who will not take part in the glory of God in the afterlife. This is in contrast to the vast majority of people, who will receive a "kingdom of glory" after the Final Judgment, and enter into one of three degrees of glory after the resurrection: the celestial kingdom, the terrestrial kingdom, or the telestial kingdom.

Most Latter-day Saints believe that the sons of perdition will be cast into outer darkness; Mormon scriptures do not use this exact phrase in connection with the sons of perdition, but state that they "shall go away into the lake of fire and brimstone, with the devil and his angels."

In this context, the name "Perdition" is sometimes regarded as a proper name that refers to either Lucifer or Cain, both of whom are symbols of ultimate evil. Biblical figures such as Judas Iscariot, various antichrists (man of sin) and false prophets (the False Prophet of Book of Revelation) are also included as being sons of perdition.

The most comprehensive exposition of the phrase is found in Section 76 in the Doctrine and Covenants.

== Two classes of sons of perdition ==
According to LDS Church theology, there are two classes of persons who will become sons of perdition:

- The pre-mortal spirit followers of Satan. It is taught that, in the pre-mortal life, they chose to follow a plan proposed by Satan, rather than that presented by God the Father (Heavenly Father). Jesus the Christ chose to follow Heavenly Father's plan (which included moral agency), volunteered to atone for the sins of all as a part of this plan/become the Savior of all, and the glory would go to the Father. Satan rejected Heavenly Father's plan and proposed his own, wanting to force all to choose the right, return to the Father, and the glory would all be Satan's. Thus ensued the War in Heaven, which resulted in Satan and his followers being cast out of heaven and denied the opportunity of receiving a physical body due to rebellion against God the Father.
- Those in mortal life who "deny the Holy Ghost" (i.e., commit the unforgivable sin), which is generally interpreted as rejecting and denying Christ after receiving a personal witness and a "perfect knowledge" of Jesus. Joseph Smith taught:

All sins shall be forgiven, except the sin against the Holy Ghost; for Jesus will save all except the sons of perdition. What must a man do to commit the unpardonable sin? He must receive the Holy Ghost, have the heavens opened unto him, and know God, and then sin against him. After a man has sinned against the Holy Ghost, there is no repentance for him. He has got to say that the sun does not shine while he sees it; he has got to deny Jesus Christ when the heavens have been opened unto him, and to deny the plan of salvation with his eyes open to the truth of it.

In the Doctrine and Covenants, sons of perdition are described as inhabiting "a kingdom which is not a kingdom of glory." However, it is commonly believed that since most persons lack a "perfect knowledge" of Jesus, they cannot commit the eternal sin, and are therefore incapable of becoming sons of perdition.

== Daughters of perdition ==
A few LDS Church leaders have speculated whether or not there would be daughters of perdition, as well as sons of perdition. In 1860, church president Brigham Young stated, "I doubt whether it can be found, from the revelations that are given and the facts as they exist, that there is a female in all the regions of hell." The next year he was even more emphatic: "Woman must atone for sins committed by the volition of her own choice, but she will never become an angel to the devil, and sin so far as to place herself beyond the reach of mercy." In the same discourse Young explained his reasoning: "She is not accountable for the sins that are in the world. God requires obedience from man, he is lord of creation, and at his hands the sins of the world will be required." In 1903, another church president, Joseph F. Smith, affirmed "that there would be no daughters of perdition."

Such views are not universal among Mormons. After an 1893 meeting of church president Wilford Woodruff and a group of church apostles, they declared, "That there will also be daughters of Perdition there is no doubt in the minds of the brethren".

== See also ==
- Universalism and the Latter Day Saint movement
