= Eternal sin =

Sin which will never be forgiven by God

In Christian hamartiology, eternal sin, the unforgivable sin, unpardonable sin, or ultimate sin is the sin which will not or will never be forgiven by God. One eternal or unforgivable sin (blasphemy against the Holy Spirit), also known as the sin unto death, is specified in several passages of the Synoptic Gospels, including Mark 3:28–29, Matthew 12:31–32, and Luke 12:10, as well as other New Testament passages including Hebrews 6:4–6, Hebrews 10:26–31, and 1 John 5:16.

The unforgivable sin is interpreted by Christian theologians in various ways, although they generally agree that one who has committed the sin is no longer able to repent, and so one who is fearful that they have committed it has not done so.

== New Testament passages ==
Several passages in the New Testament are frequently interpreted as referring to the unforgivable sin:

- Matthew 12:30–32: "Whoever is not with me is against me, and whoever does not gather with me scatters. Therefore I tell you, people will be forgiven for every sin and blasphemy, but blasphemy against the Spirit will not be forgiven. Whoever speaks a word against the Son of Man will be forgiven, but whoever speaks against the Holy Spirit will not be forgiven, either in this age or in the age to come."
- Mark 3:28–30: "Truly I tell you, people will be forgiven for their sins and whatever blasphemies they utter; but whoever blasphemes against the Holy Spirit can never have forgiveness, but is guilty of an eternal sin—for they had said, 'He has an unclean spirit.'"
- Luke 12:8–10: "And I tell you, everyone who acknowledges me before others, the Son of Man also will acknowledge before the angels of God; but whoever denies me before others will be denied before the angels of God. And everyone who speaks a word against the Son of Man will be forgiven; but whoever blasphemes against the Holy Spirit will not be forgiven."
- Hebrews 6:4–6: "For it is impossible to restore again to repentance those who have once been enlightened, and have tasted the heavenly gift, and have shared in the Holy Spirit, and have tasted the goodness of the word of God and the powers of the age to come, and then have fallen away, since on their own they are crucifying again the Son of God and are holding him up to contempt."
- Hebrews 10:26–31: "For if we willfully persist in sin after having received the knowledge of the truth, there no longer remains a sacrifice for sins, but a fearful prospect of judgment, and a fury of fire that will consume the adversaries. Anyone who has violated the law of Moses dies without mercy 'on the testimony of two or three witnesses'. How much worse punishment do you think will be deserved by those who have spurned the Son of God, profaned the blood of the covenant by which they were sanctified, and outraged the Spirit of grace? For we know the one who said, 'Vengeance is mine, I will repay.' And again, 'The Lord will judge his people.' It is a fearful thing to fall into the hands of the living God."
- 1 John 5:16: "If any man see his brother sin a sin which is not unto death, he shall ask, and he shall give him life for them that sin not unto death. There is a sin unto death: I do not say that he shall pray for it."

== Teaching by Christian denomination ==
=== Arminianism ===
The teaching of Jacob Arminius defined the unforgivable sin as "the rejection and refusing of Jesus Christ through determined malice and hatred against Christ". However, Arminius differed with Calvin in believing that sin could be committed by believers, a conclusion he reached through his interpretation of Hebrews 6:4–6.

John Wesley, the father of the Methodist tradition, discussed the unforgivable sin in a sermon titled A Call to Backsliders, in which he wrote that "this blasphemy is absolutely unpardonable; and that, consequently, for those who have been guilty of this, God 'will be no more entreated'." A prominent Methodist catechism, "A Catechism on the Christian Religion: The Doctrines of Christianity with Special Emphasis on Wesleyan Concepts" states:

The unpardonable sin is blasphemy against the Holy Spirit. Blasphemy includes ridicule and attributing the works of the Holy Spirit to the devil.

This Wesleyan–Arminian interpretation of the unforgivable sin includes the deliberate labeling of good as evil, as rejecting the conviction of the Holy Spirit, of publicly attributing the work of the Holy Spirit to Satan, and attributing the work of Jesus to Satan. The United Methodist Church, a Methodist connexion, thus teaches:

that the penalty of eternal separation from God with no hope of return applies in scripture only in two cases—either, as in Hebrews 6 and 10, to persons who willfully, publicly and explicitly reject Jesus as Savior after having confessed him, or, as in the gospels, to those who blaspheme against the Holy Spirit by declaring that the works of Jesus were the works of the Evil one.

=== Mormonism ===
Members of the Church of Jesus Christ of Latter-day Saints, also nicknamed Mormons, have a similar understanding of eternal sin. Joseph Smith, the founder of the Latter Day Saint movement, said in the King Follett discourse:

All sins shall be forgiven, except the sin against the Holy Ghost; for Jesus will save all except the sons of perdition. What must a man do to commit the unpardonable sin? He must receive the Holy Ghost, have the heavens opened unto him, and know God, and then sin against him. After a man has sinned against the Holy Ghost, there is no repentance for him. He has got to say that the sun does not shine while he sees it; he has got to deny Jesus Christ when the heavens have been opened unto him, and to deny the plan of salvation with his eyes open to the truth of it; and from that time he begins to be an enemy.

Church apostle and later President of the Church, Spencer W. Kimball, stated that "the sin against the Holy Ghost requires such knowledge that it is manifestly impossible for the rank and file [of the church] to commit such a sin".

=== Reformed ===
John Calvin, the founder of the Reformed tradition of Christianity (which includes the Continental Reformed, Presbyterian, Congregationalist and Reformed Anglican denominations) wrote:

I say, therefore, that he sins against the Holy Spirit who, while so constrained by the power of divine truth that he cannot plead ignorance, yet deliberately resists, and that merely for the sake of resisting.

=== Catholicism ===
The Church Fathers considered additional interpretations other than it being to attribute the Holy Spirit's works to Satan; Augustine of Hippo called it one of the more difficult passages of Scripture. Thomas Aquinas summarized the Church Fathers' treatments and proposed three possible explanations:

1. That an insult directed against any of the Three Divine Persons may be considered a sin against the Holy Spirit; and/or;
2. That persisting in mortal sin till death, with final impenitence, as Augustine proposed, frustrates the work of the Holy Spirit, to whom is appropriated the remission of sins; and/or;
3. That sins against the quality of the Third Divine Person, being charity and goodness, are conducted in malice, in that they resist the inspirations of the Holy Spirit to turn away from or be delivered from evil. Such sin may be considered graver than those committed against the Father through frailty, and those committed against the Son through ignorance.

In the context of the Gospels of Matthew and Mark, blasphemy against the Spirit is the sin of attributing to Satan what is the work of the Spirit of God, such as when the Pharisees earlier accused Jesus of driving out demons only by the power of Beelzebul, the prince of demons. The Catholic Encyclopedia cites Matthew 12:22–32; Mark 3:22–30; Luke 12:10 (cf. 11:14–23) and gives one definition of "the unforgivable sin"—or sin against the Holy Ghost—as "to sin against the Holy Ghost is to confound Him with the spirit of evil, it is to deny, from pure malice, the Divine character of works manifestly Divine." The article further states that "sin against the Son of Man" may be forgiven because it is committed against the human person of Christ, which veils the Divine with a "humble and lowly appearance," and therefore such sin is excusable because it is committed through "man's ignorance and misunderstanding."

According to the Catechism of the Council of Trent, referencing Ambrose's Concerning Repentance, the Church believes there is no offence, however serious, that cannot be taken away by Baptism, or absolved from in the Confessional—that no one, however wicked and guilty, may not confidently hope for forgiveness.

Thomas Aquinas lists, or responds to, six sins that go against the Holy Spirit:

- Despair: which consists in thinking that one's own malice is greater than Divine Goodness, as Peter Lombard (Aquinas cites him under the title of "Master of the Sentences") teaches,
- Presumption: if a person wants to obtain glory without merits (Note: It is considered that the death-bed prayer of repentance is a meritorious act, and thus does not obtain glory without merit.) or pardon without repentance (Note: Repentance itself does not need to be perfect repentance in Catholic theology in order to count as repentance; so long as there is sorrow for the sin committed, or in repenting fear of God, there can be repentance: it is also considered better to repent from a sin and do it again, waiting maybe for a better time to repent more completely, than not to repent from the sin at all until a perfect time to repent, after which one would not sin.)
- Resistance to the known truth
- Envy of a brother's spiritual good, i.e., of the increase of Divine grace in the world
- Impenitence, i.e., the specific purpose of not repenting a sin
- Obstinacy, "whereby a person hardens his purpose by clinging to sin".

Thomas Aquinas explains that the unforgivability of blasphemy against the Holy Spirit means that it removes the entrance to these means of salvation; however, it cannot hinder God in taking away this obstacle by way of a miracle.

The Catechism of the Catholic Church teaches that, while no sin is absolutely "unforgivable", dying unrepentant represents a deliberate refusal to repent and accept the infinite mercy of God; a person committing such a sin refuses God's forgiveness, which can lead to self-condemnation to Hell. In other words, one damns oneself by final impenitence (refusal to repent), as taught by John Paul II:

The images of hell that Sacred Scripture presents to us must be correctly interpreted... hell indicates the state of those who freely and definitively separate themselves from God... "To die in mortal sin without repenting and accepting God's merciful love means remaining separated from him for ever by our own free choice. This state of definitive self-exclusion from communion with God and the blessed is called 'hell'"... "Eternal damnation", therefore, is not attributed to God's initiative because in his merciful love he can only desire the salvation of the beings he created. In reality, it is the creature who closes himself to his love. Damnation consists precisely in definitive separation from God, freely chosen by the human person and confirmed with death that seals his choice for ever. God's judgement ratifies this state.

The Catechism says that Christ desires "the gates of forgiveness should always be open to anyone who turns away from sin." As did St. Augustine, the Catholic Church today teaches that dying unrepentant for one's sins is the only unforgivable sin. In Dominum et vivificantem, Pope John Paul II writes "According to such an exegesis, 'blasphemy' does not properly consist in offending against the Holy Spirit in words; it consists rather in the refusal to accept the salvation which God offers to man through the Holy Spirit, working through the power of the Cross", and "If Jesus says that blasphemy against the Holy Spirit cannot be forgiven either in this life or in the next, it is because this "non-forgiveness" is linked, as to its cause, to "non-repentance," in other words to the radical refusal to be converted. This means the refusal to come to the sources of Redemption, which nevertheless remain "always" open in the economy of salvation in which the mission of the Holy Spirit is accomplished."

=== Russian Orthodox Church ===
The importance of prayer (1 Thessalonians 5:17: "pray without ceasing") and humility (Jesus Prayer: "Lord Jesus Christ, Son of God, have mercy on me, a sinner") in Christianity is reflected by an Orthodox catechism as follows:

Jesus Christ called the Holy Spirit "Spirit of Truth" (John 14:17; 15:26; John 16:13) and warned us, "All manner of sin and blasphemy shall be forgiven unto men; but the blasphemy against the Holy Spirit shall not be forgiven unto men" (Matthew 12:31).

"Blasphemy against the Holy Spirit" is conscious and hardened opposition to the truth, "because the Spirit is truth" (1 John 5:6). Conscious and hardened resistance to the truth leads man away from humility and repentance, and without repentance, there can be no forgiveness. That is why the sin of blasphemy against the Spirit cannot be forgiven since one who does not acknowledge his sin does not seek to have it forgiven.

— Serafim Alexivich Slobodskoy, The Eighth Article of the Creed

=== Southern Baptists ===
According to Southern Baptist pastor Billy Graham, continuing to reject Jesus is blasphemy against the Holy Spirit.

== In Judaism ==
A very similar, although not identical, parallel to Matthew 12:31–32 can be found in the Avot of Rabbi Natan:

But someone who profanes the heavenly Name has no possibility of repenting and waiting for forgiveness. Suffering will not cleanse him. Yom Kippur will not atone for him. They are all held over until death comes and cleanses him. This is what is meant by "This sin will not be forgiven until you die".

However, Talmudic sources in several places qualify the above and similar statements and explain it to mean only that repentance is made more difficult because of the severity of such a sin. The Talmud's golden rule is that the gates of repentance are never, ever closed and, to quote Maimonides, "even if one is a heretic his whole life and repents on his dying day, his penitence is accepted."

== See also ==
- Anantarika-karma
- Lincoln's House Divided Speech, referencing Matthew Chapter 12 and Mark Chapter 3
- Seven deadly sins
- Catholic hamartiology
