= Judaism and Mormonism =

Judaism and The Church of Jesus Christ of Latter-day Saints

The Church of Jesus Christ of Latter-day Saints (LDS Church) has several teachings about Judaism and the House of Israel. The largest denomination in the Latter Day Saint movement, the LDS Church teaches the belief that the Jewish people are God's chosen people and its members (i.e. Mormons) share a common and literal Israelite ancestry with the Jewish people.

== A comparison of the Latter Day Saint movement and Judaism ==
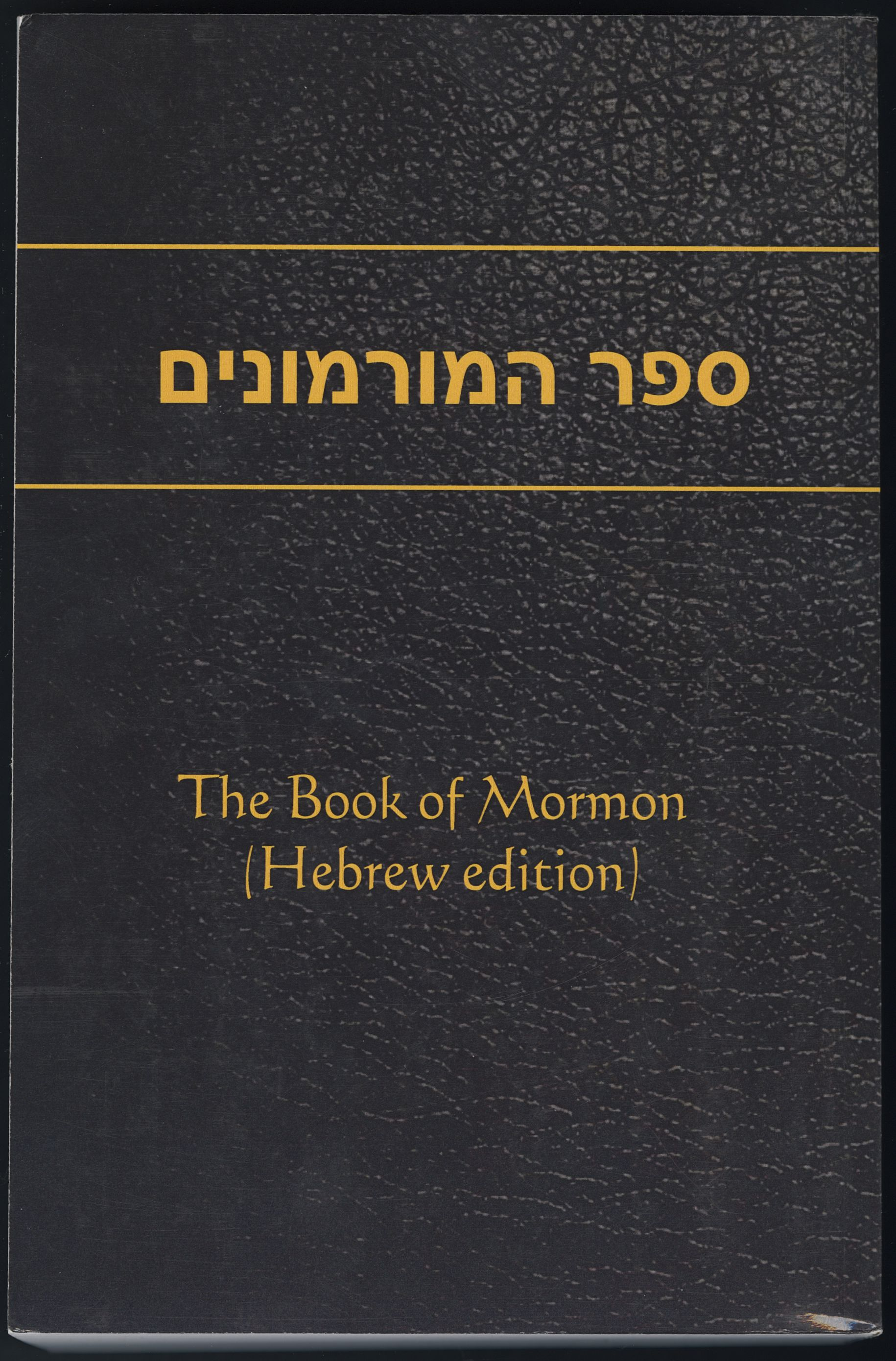
The Book of Mormon in Hebrew.

=== The nature of God ===
Jewish theology is strictly monotheistic: God is an absolutely singular, indivisible, incorporeal, and incomparable being who is the ultimate cause of all existence. The Hebrew Bible presents God as the creator of the universe and the power controlling reality. The God of the Israelites commands them to worship no other gods but him: the God who brought them out of Egypt. The Babylonian Talmud references other, "foreign gods" as non-existent entities to whom humans mistakenly ascribe reality and power.

The theology of the largest Latter-day Saint denomination (headquartered in Salt Lake City) maintains that God the Father (Heavenly Father), Jesus (his son), and the Holy Ghost are three separate and distinct beings in personhood and substance, yet one in purpose. James E. Faust expounded the church's doctrine when he said,

The First Vision confirms the fact there are three separate Gods: God the Father—Elohim, to whom we address our prayers; Jesus the Christ—Jehovah; and the Holy Ghost—the Comforter, through whose spirit we may know the truth of all things.

Together, the three constitute the Mormon conception of the Godhead, understood as distinct beings united in purpose and intent, which differs starkly from the Jewish Godhead. Mormon theology asserts that God the Father and Jesus have tangible, perfected bodies of flesh and bone. In contrast, the God of Judaism and the Hebrew Bible is strictly incorporeal and not anthropomorphic in any way. Humans are thought to be the literal spirit children of the Father in Mormonism, and through the atonement of Jesus, they can return to him upon dying and become gods. In his King Follet discourse, Joseph Smith said:

God himself was once as we are now, and is an exalted Man, and sits enthroned in yonder heavens. That is the great secret .... It is the first principle of the Gospel to know for a certainty the character of God and to know ... that he was once a man like us. Here, then, is eternal life—to know that only wise and true God, and you have got to learn how to become Gods yourselves, and to be kings and priests to God, the same as all Gods have done before you. ... God himself, the father of us all dwelt on an earth the same as Jesus Christ.

Furthermore, there are gods in the Mormon pantheon besides the Godhead's members, including the Heavenly Mother. Latter-day Saint theology also holds that, through the process of exaltation, humans can ascend to godhood. Within LDS theology, God the Father and Jesus were once mortal men who became exalted. However, how they came to obtain godhood is poorly characterized and doctrinally different from the process of exaltation humans are believed to undergo. In other words, God the Father and Jesus became divine beings much differently than the path through exaltation LDS members believe they will take to reach the same status. This differs from the Community of Christ's theology, which aligns more closely with Nicaean Christianity—in that it is trinitarian rather than nontrinitarian—than the LDS Church. In addition, there are other Latter Day Saint sects, such as the Church of Christ With the Elijah Message, that hold to the unity of God, expressing a form of modalism. The Book of Mormon also lends itself to modalistic interpretations of the Mormon Godhead.

=== Jesus ===
Jesus is not a component of Judaism or a figure in the Hebrew Bible; Jews do not believe Jesus fulfilled the criteria for messiahship. With regard to the divinity of Jesus, a basic tenet of Judaism is that God is one in both substance and personhood; therefore, both the Christian doctrine of the Trinity and the Mormon doctrine of three separate Gods "united in purpose" are summarily rejected by Judaism. Jews do not believe that God has or can have a body. Therefore, the idea that God might have physical, "begotten" children is not possible and is considered heresy.

According to the LDS Church, Jesus was the only-begotten son of God the Father. Latter-day Saints identify Jesus with the Hebrew Bible's Jehovah, not with God the Father, indicating that the Mosaic covenant with Jehovah was actually with Jesus. Mormons believe that, due to Jesus's suffering, death, and resurrection, humanity is saved from death and will rise again and receive a perfected physical body. Furthermore, they believe that Jesus's crucifixion satisfied the divine justice supposedly required for human sins; salvation is extended to all who accept Jesus as their personal savior and become lifelong disciples of Christianity. Latter-day Saints also believe that there is only one God to whom prayer is offered: God the Father. Latter-day Saints do not pray to Jesus, though historically, this was not always the case.

Latter-day Saints believe that the atonement of Jesus goes so far as to cover everyone who is doing their best to be good (including non-Christians). Eventually, it will even rescue almost all of the spirits of the wicked from the "telestial kingdom". The type of reward they receive, however, depends on the level of their acceptance and obedience of Jesus.

=== Prophecy ===
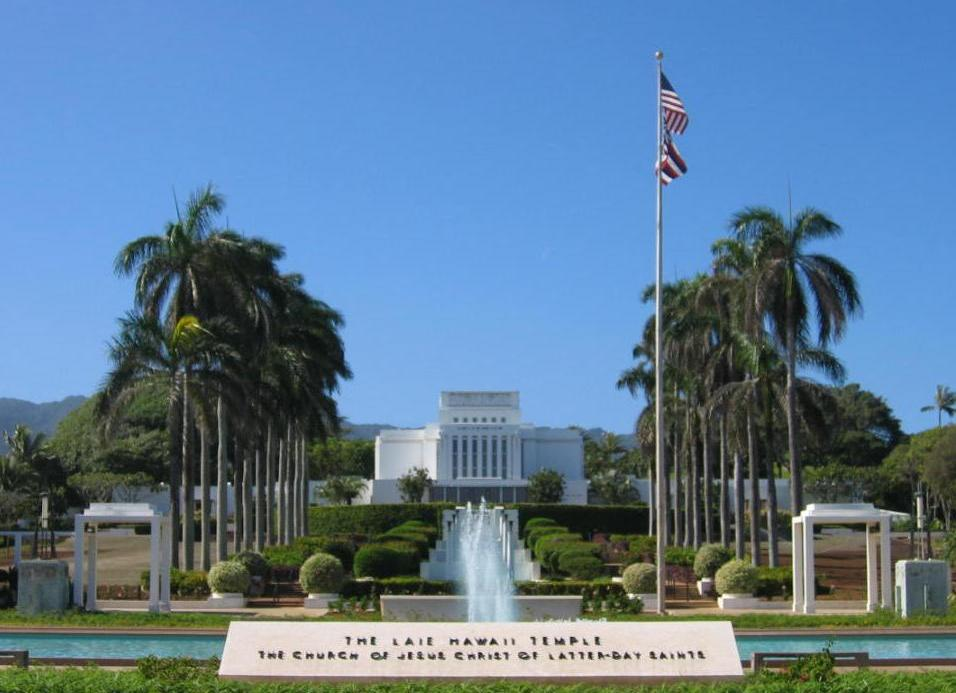
Laie Hawaii Temple is the fifth oldest temple of the LDS Church in the world. It is also one of three church temples designed to look like Solomon's Temple, as described in scripture.

Normative Jewish tradition has held the view that prophecy ceased after the death of Malachi and that prophecy will be restored during the Messianic era. Latter-day Saints believe that revelation was present during the dispensation of Jesus and that through Joseph Smith, prophecy was restored from the age of apostasy; Mormons believe that Smith and his successors were and are prophets. Additionally, Smith reported that, during the dedication of the Kirtland Temple, Jesus, Moses, Elijah, and Elias appeared to him and Oliver Cowdery, giving them authority to gather Israel (i.e., the Jews) from the four parts of the earth, lead the Ten Lost Tribes from the north, administer the keys of the Abrahamic dispensation, and the keys of sealing powers (Doctrine and Covenants 110:3–4, 7).

=== Temples ===
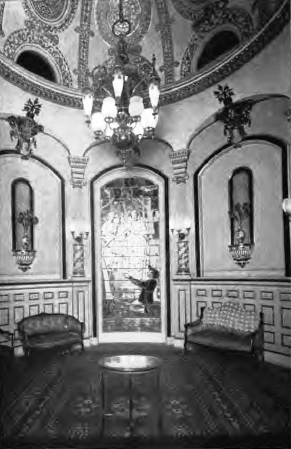
The Salt Lake Temple contains a "Holy of Holies."

Solomon's Temple held the Ark of the Covenant in a room of the temple referred to as the Holy of Holies. The presiding high priest would enter this room, said to contain the Shekhinah (the presence of God), once annually on Yom Kippur.

The LDS Church's Salt Lake Temple contains a Holy of Holies wherein the church's president—acting as the Presiding High Priest—enters to fulfill the relationship between the High Priest of Israel and God, in accordance with the LDS Church's theological interpretation of the Book of Exodus. Hence, the LDS Church's Holy of Holies is considered by its adherents to be a cognate to the inner sanctuary of the Tabernacle and Temple in Jerusalem.

Of the 173 (Note: The LDS Church has 385 temples in various phases, which includes 227 dedicated temples (221 operating, 6 undergoing renovations), 6 with dedications scheduled, 59 under construction, 5 with groundbreaking ceremonies scheduled, and 86 others announced (not yet under construction).) temples operated by the LDS Church today, only the Salt Lake Temple has a Holy of Holies; previous to the completion of the Salt Lake Temple in 1893, the Manti Utah Temple housed a Holy of Holies for the use by the president of the Church. While the room itself still exists in the Manti Temple, it was used as a sealing room for marriages for some time; since it is such a small room, it is now open only for viewing by temple patrons.

Latter-day Saints believe that Jews will one day rebuild a temple in Jerusalem and that the Jews will restore the practice of rituals of the Law of Moses within that temple.

=== Priesthood and clergy ===
Judaism holds that descendants of Aaron in the male line are Kohanim, or priests, and other descendants of Levi in the male line are Leviim, members of the Hebrew tribe of Levi. Kohanim and Leviim have specific religious rights, duties, and (in the case of Kohanim) restrictions. The daughter of a Kohen (a bat-Kohen) also has specific rights and restrictions but does not pass on the status of Kohen to her offspring (unless their father is also a Kohen). Judaism recognizes no other forms of priesthood.

Rabbis are not necessarily Kohanim; rather, they are Jews who are particularly learned in Jewish law. Although not required, it is typical for a congregation to have at least one rabbi. While it is typical for rabbis to act similarly to spiritual leaders in other religions—delivering a weekly sermon, visiting the sick, officiating at weddings and other life events, and so on—a rabbi's most important function in his or her congregation is interpreting and teaching Jewish law.

Training to become a rabbi includes extensive education in Jewish law and practice, and may also include education in Jewish history and philosophy. In general, a congregation will hire a rabbi after reviewing applications and interviewing several candidates—there is no central body that assigns a rabbi to a congregation.

Orthodox Judaism accepts only male rabbis. Reform Judaism ordained its first female rabbi in 1972, Reconstructionist Judaism in 1974, and Conservative Judaism in 1985. All three non-Orthodox movements also accept openly gay and lesbian rabbis. Karaite Judaism accepts only male ḥakhamim, although they serve a different purpose than rabbis do in Rabbinic Judaism. Conservative Judaism moved to allow individual congregations to choose whether or not to accept both gay and lesbian rabbis and same-sex commitment ceremonies in December 2006. There are no restrictions in any branch of Judaism with regard to race or descent.

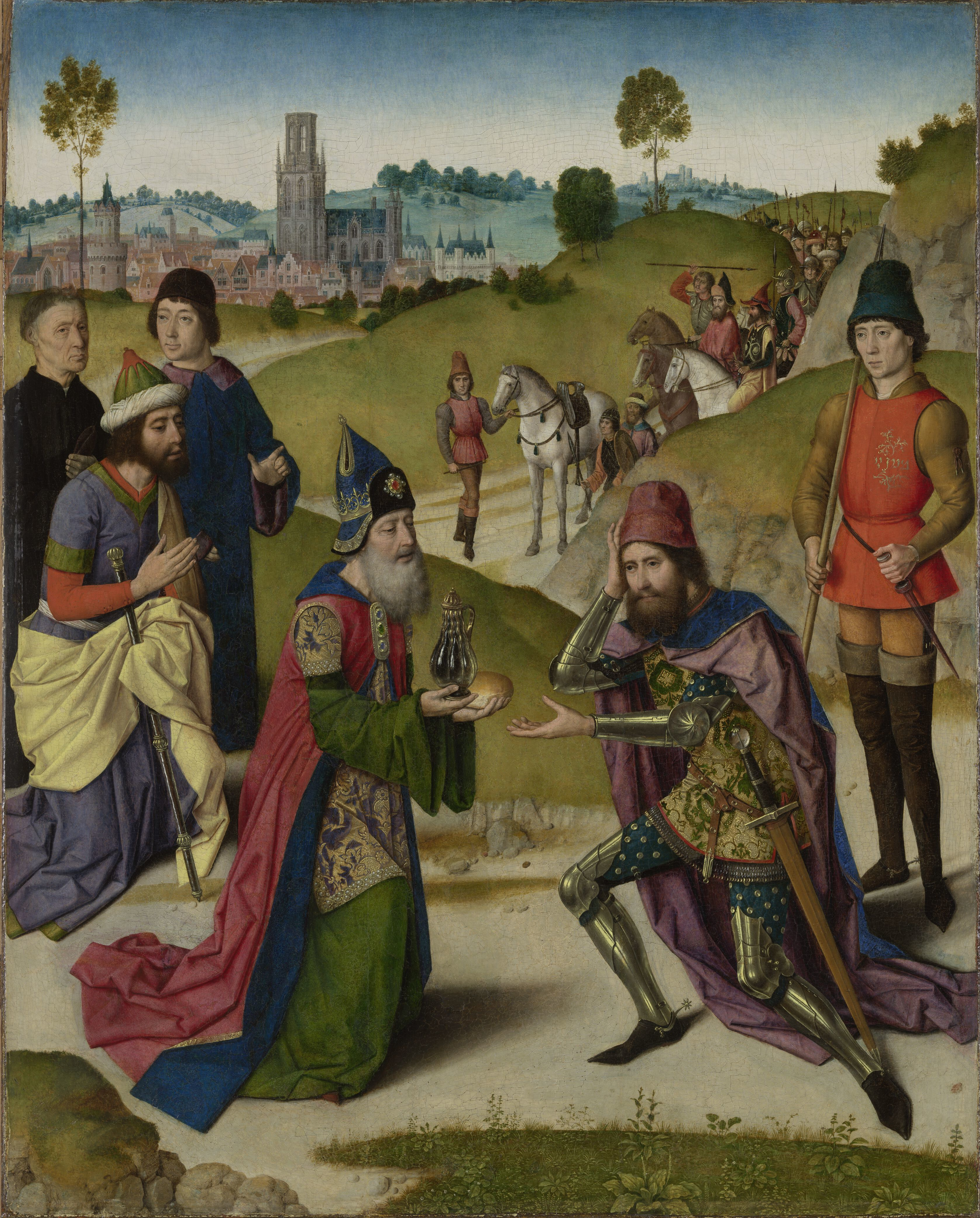
Meeting of Abraham and Melchizedek — by Dieric Bouts the Elder, 1464–67

The LDS Church allows "literal descendants of Aaron" the legal right to preside as bishop, when so directed by the First Presidency. When no worthy descendants of Aaron are available, Melchizedek priesthood holders preside instead.

The orders of the priesthood are the Aaronic, modeled after the priesthood of Aaron the Levite, the first high priest of the Hebrews, and his descendants (Kohen); and the Melchizedek priesthood, modeled after the authority of the prophet Melchizedek. The LDS Church does not recognize a patriarchal order of priesthood separate from the Melchizedek priesthood, and considers that both the Patriarchal and Aaronic priesthoods are subsets of the Melchizedek.

Members of the Tribe of Levi are said to have held the Levitical priesthood by right of birth before Jesus, whereas after Jesus, holders of the Aaronic priesthood have received it "by prophecy, and by the laying on of hands". The Doctrine and Covenants, however, contains an indication that the Aaronic priesthood is only available until the Tribe of Levi again "makes an offering unto the Lord in righteousness" (See D&C 13:1). The Aaronic priesthood is now typically given at the age of twelve.

Just as the priest's and the high priest's lines were subsets of the tribe of Levi, parallels may be drawn between levels of authority within the offices of the Latter-day Saint Aaronic priesthood and offices under the Law: deacons, corresponding to Levites; teachers, corresponding to Kohathites; priests, corresponding to the priestly line; and bishops, corresponding to the Aaronic High Priest's descendants (not to be confused with the High Priesthood of Melchizedek).

All worthy males are eligible to receive the Aaronic Priesthood at age twelve. At age eighteen, worthy members of the Aaronic priesthood are eligible to be ordained as elders in the Melchizedek Priesthood. Depending on the needs of a church, an elder may be ordained a high priest, patriarch, seventy, or apostle of the Melchizedek Priesthood.

Black people were prohibited from receiving the priesthood until 1978, at which time the LDS Church announced that its leaders had received a revelation permitting all worthy males to receive the priesthood. Some Mormon fundamentalist sects reject this revelation.

Some break-off groups, including the Community of Christ (formerly the Reorganized Church of Jesus Christ of Latter Day Saints), have adopted the use of women in clerical roles, which is not accepted by the LDS Church.

=== Dietary laws ===
The laws of kashrut ("keeping kosher") are the Jewish dietary laws. Food which is prepared in accordance with halakha (Jewish law) is termed kosher, and food which is not prepared in accordance with Jewish law is termed treifah or treif. Kosher laws address which kinds of animals can be eaten and they also require the separation of milk and meat (disputed), they command that vegetables be thoroughly inspected for insects, they command that animals be ritually slaughtered by certified persons, and they command that many food products be produced under rabbinical supervision. Produce from the Land of Israel is subjected to further restrictions.

Jews are expected or required to drink wine on certain occasions. Wine is typically consumed during the Sabbath evening meal, after the recitation of a special blessing. In addition, the drinking of wine is an important part of the celebration of two major Jewish holidays—Passover and Purim.

Latter-Day Saints believe that the Word of Wisdom is a modern revelation which is similar to the laws of kashrut. The revelation, which is found in the D&C 89, contains three parts; a list of substances such as wine, strong drink, and tobacco that should not be used, but with exceptions ( 89:1–9), a list of foods that should be used, sometimes with certain limitations ( 89:10–17), and a promise to those who follow the guidelines ( 89:18–21).

Among the substances which should not be used according to the revelation, the first substance is "wine or strong drink", which the revelation says should not be drunk except for wine, which may be used as part of sacraments (for example, weddings, and the Latter-Day Saint communion). As a further precaution, the revelation states that if wine is used, it should be pure wine and it should be "of your own make" or it should be made by fellow church members. The LDS Church has done away with wine altogether, with water replacing wine in the sacrament. Another revelation, D&C 27, gives similar instruction: that wine should only be used if it is made by church members. While section 27 does not instruct the use of water (indeed, after receiving this revelation Joseph Smith understood it to mean that he should make his own wine - see History of the Church 1:108), it is used as justification for the change.

The revelation also advises against the use of tobacco and "hot drinks" (which was explained by Joseph Smith and his associates as meaning coffee, tea, hot chocolate, hot soup, and other hot liquids). Tobacco is believed to be "not for the body, neither for the belly, and it is not good for man, but it is an herb for bruises and all sick cattle, to be used with judgment and skill."

The list of foods and substances that the revelation encourages the consumption of includes wholesome herbs, and fruits; however, meat is to be eaten sparingly and ideally, it should only be eaten in the winter, during famines, or during periods of "excess hunger". Other references (1 Timothy 4:1–4 and Section 49:18–19,21) expand on meat and flesh. The revelation also encourages the use of grains, particularly wheat. The use of barley is also encouraged, particularly for the making of "mild drinks".

=== Sabbath ===
Shabbat, lasting from sunset Friday night to the appearance of three stars on Saturday night, celebrates God's creation with a day of rest that commemorates God's day of rest upon the completion of creation. It plays an important role in Jewish practice and is the subject of a large body of religious law. The most notable law with regard to observation of Jewish Sabbath is the requirement to abstain from creative work of any kind (the most widely known implication of this being the prohibition against kindling a fire). Observant Jews will prepare food ahead of time to avoid having to cook on Sabbath, and observant Orthodox Jews will avoid turning on electric lights (which "creates" an electric circuit) or driving.

While almost all work is forbidden on Sabbath, acts of leisure and pleasure are appropriate, as long as they do not violate any proscription with regard to doing work. A special meal is eaten (including wine and meat, if possible, even if the household cannot afford these luxuries the rest of the week). Married couples are encouraged to engage in sexual relations.

The Sabbath for Latter-day Saints is whichever day is being kept as a Sabbath by the larger surrounding community. Thus, in most predominately Christian nations the Latter-day Saints keep Sunday as the Sabbath and have adopted Christian ideas about it. This is explained in the Church Bible Dictionary as: "After the ascension of Christ, the members of the Church, whether Jews or gentiles, kept holy the first day of the week (the Lord's day) as a weekly commemoration of our Lord's resurrection (Acts 20: 7; 1 Cor. 16: 2; Rev. 1: 10); and by degrees the observance of the seventh day was discontinued." However, in Israel and some Arab countries, Latter-day Saints celebrate Sabbath on Saturday or on Friday, according to the local customs.

The focus of Sabbath for Latter-day Saints is as a day of rest from worldly concerns and endeavors and to concentrate on spiritual matters such as attending church meetings, scripture study, visiting the sick and infirm, and family activities. Members are further encouraged not to make any purchases on the Sabbath, unless an emergency demands otherwise. Members are also invited to fast on the first Sabbath of the month and abstain from two meals over a 24-hour period, which often corresponds to not eating breakfast or lunch on that day. This period of fasting is used to pray and reflect on their own relationship with God. The money that would have been spent on the two missed meals is usually donated as a fast offering to the church. These fast offerings are dedicated to feed the poor and the needy.

=== Scriptures ===
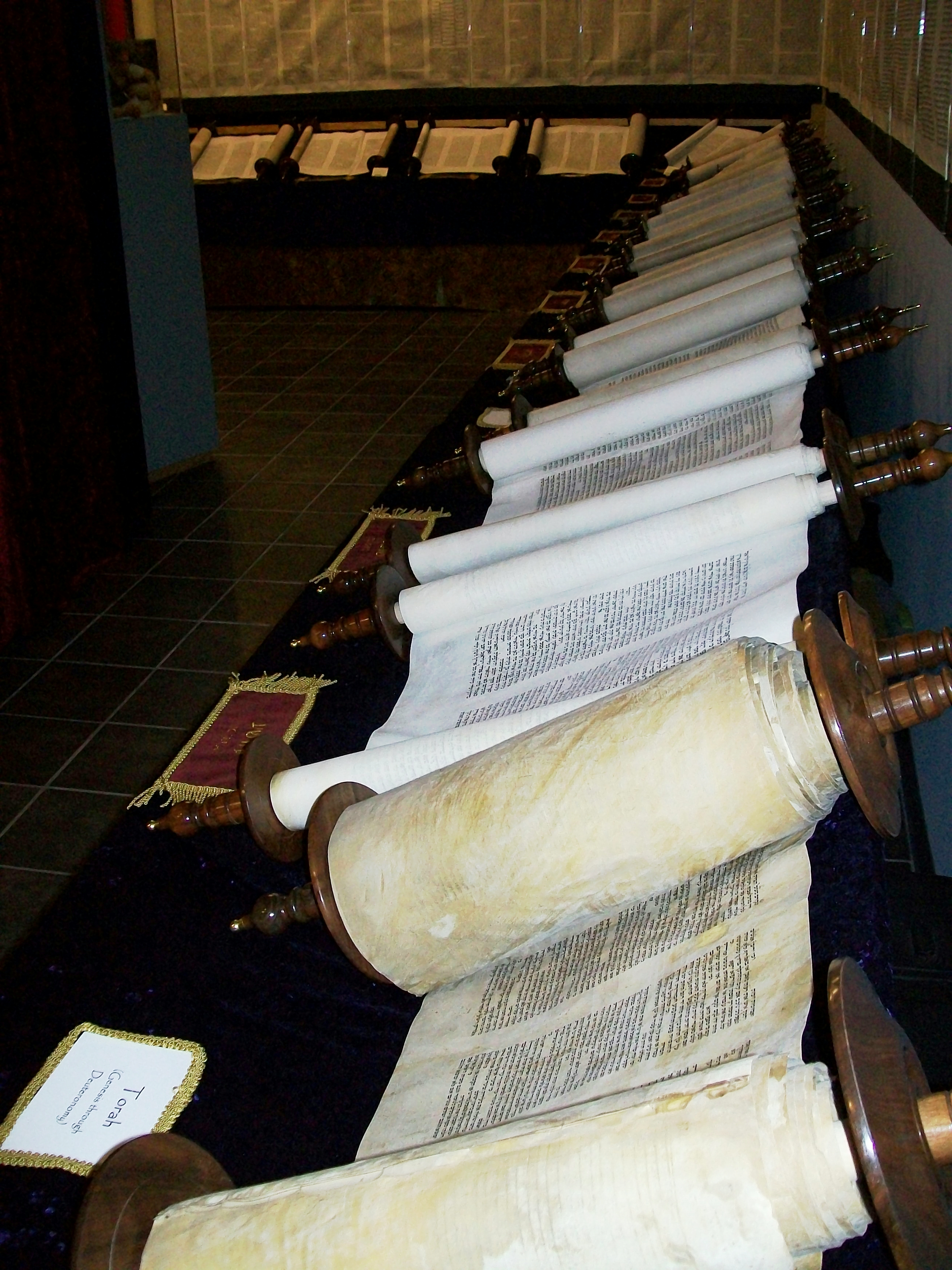
Complete set of scrolls, constituting the entire Tanakh

Judaism's most holy book is the Torah. Virtually all Jewish congregations own at least one sefer Torah (copy of the Torah, hand-calligraphed on parchment) of which a portion is read aloud every week. The Torah, the Nevi'im (the Prophets) and Ketuvim (the Writings), make up the Tanakh.

The Tanakh is explained and supplemented by the Talmud, which is made up of two parts: the Mishnah (Oral Torah) and the Gemara (rabbinic commentaries and analysis). More recent work explaining Jewish law includes the Shulkhan Arukh, which was written in the 16th century. Traditionally, Jews believe that the Torah was given to Moses at Mount Sinai, to be passed on to the Jewish people. Scrolls of the Torah are copied by hand by specially trained scribes.

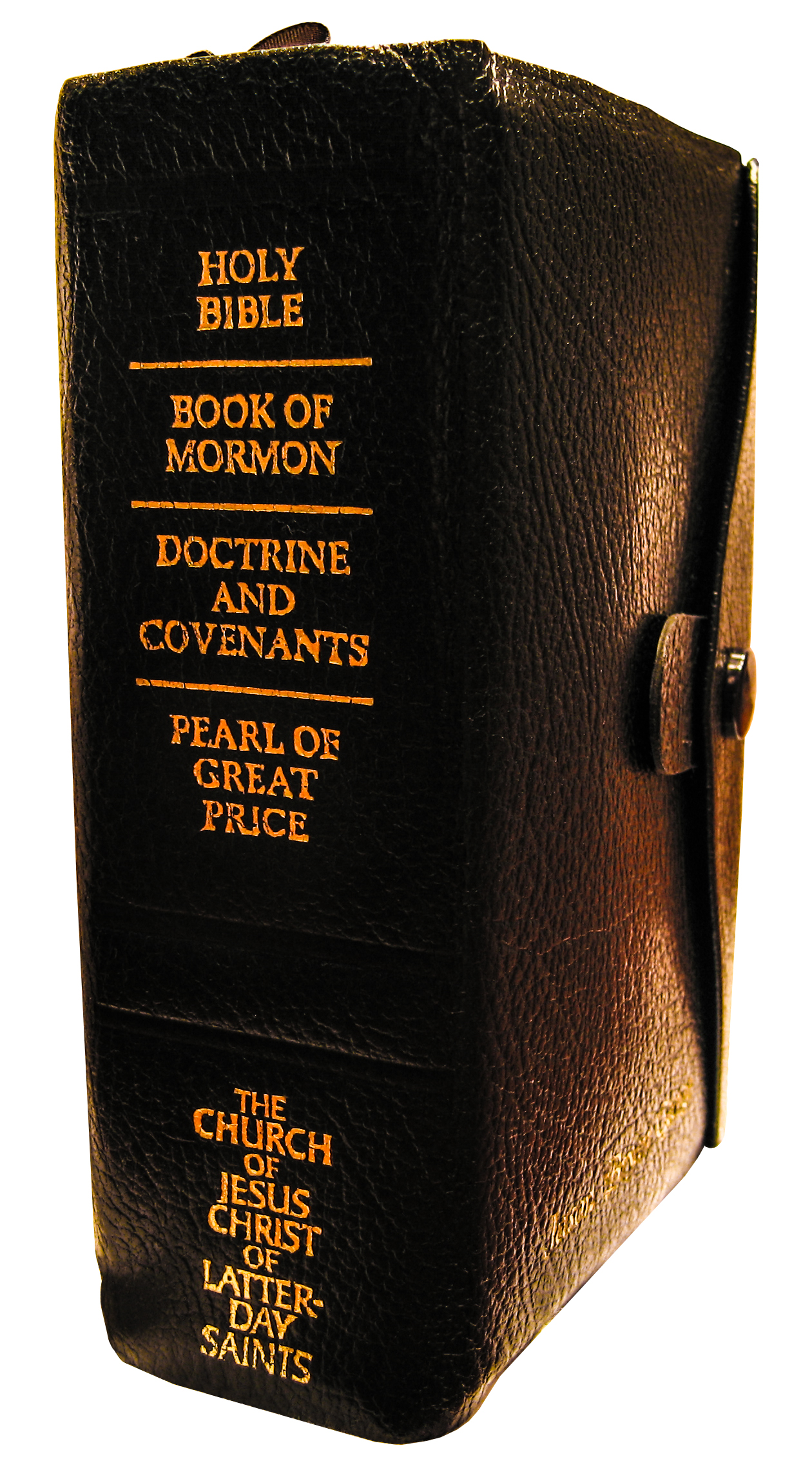
The Standard Works of the LDS Church printed in the Quadruple Combination format

Joseph Smith said, "I told the brethren that the Book of Mormon was the most correct of any book on earth, and the keystone of our religion, and a man would get nearer to God by abiding by its precepts, than by any other book." Thus, the study of The Book of Mormon is emphasized by Church leaders and teachers, but they also encourage the study of the Old and New Testaments of the Bible and believe in literal fulfillment of Biblical prophecies and covenants, including the Abrahamic covenant. The eighth Article of Faith states, "We believe the Bible to be the word of God as far as it is translated correctly; we also believe the Book of Mormon to be the word of God." In addition to these two books, in keeping with the meaning of the ninth Article of Faith, the Doctrine and Covenants and Pearl of Great Price are also considered canonical scripture.

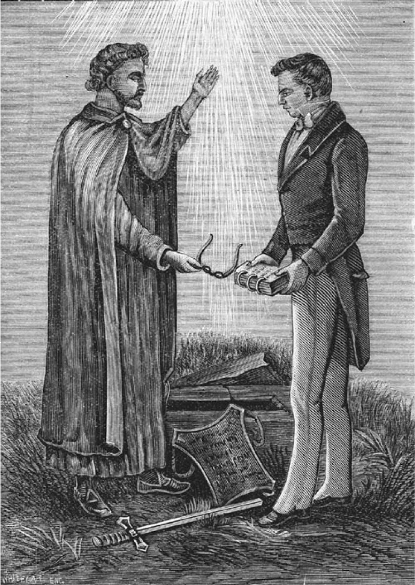
An 1893 engraving of Joseph Smith receiving the golden plates and the Urim and Thummim from Moroni. The sword of Laban is shown nearby.

According to Latter-Day Saint doctrine, the Book of Mormon was originally written in reformed Egyptian by a group of the House of Israel who had migrated from the area of Jerusalem. The book was translated by Joseph Smith "by the gift and power of God". The Book of Mormon is in a style that closely resembles the language used in the King James Version of the Bible.

=== Afterlife ===
Jewish beliefs with regard to an afterlife are highly variable. Physical resurrection of the dead at the time of the Mashiach is a traditional belief (with some European Jews being buried facing Jerusalem, so they would be ready on that day). Other Jewish sages promoted the idea of a purely spiritual resurrection. Adherents of Reform Judaism and Reconstructionist Judaism are more likely to believe in a general Messianic Age than in a physical Moshiach, with or without resurrection. There is also the possibility of reincarnation in some cases.

In general, religious Jews believe that the soul undergoes a period of reflection and penance after death, before moving on to whatever comes next. This period does not exceed 12 months, and Jewish mourners will say special prayers for the dead during this time, to ease the departed soul's passage. (See Kaddish).

Heaven and Hell as they are understood in Christian theology are roughly analogous to the Jewish Olam habah and Gehenna, with certain major differences. Jewish faiths generally agree that reward in the afterlife or world to come, whatever its form, is not exclusive to Jews, and that punishment in the afterlife is not eternal but corrective.

The Latter-Day Saint movement teaches of a physical resurrection for some beginning with the resurrection of Christ. At the time of the second coming of Christ there will be a general resurrection of the dead. It is held by the LDS Church that between the time of an individual's death and resurrection, the individual inhabits an intermediary afterlife in the Spirit world. The nature of this afterlife depends on the individual. Deceased persons who lived good lives and repented during their life of any major sins they had committed are said to inhabit Paradise. However, spirits inhabiting spirit paradise may also receive an assignment to do "missionary work" to other souls in paradise or to the souls in spirit prison, the condition in which Latter-Day Saints believe the spirits of the "rebellious and ungodly" reside. The term "spirit prison" is sometimes used to describe the condition of any spirit who is awaiting being taught the gospel or having the opportunity to accept ordinances that allow them to progress in gaining further knowledge during their time in the spirit world. Latter-Day Saints hold that missionary work in the spirit world was started by Christ during the days between his death and resurrection (Doctrine and Covenants 138).

As Smith's personal writings and Latter-Day Saint scriptures indicate, it is also possible that if one follows the commandments, then one may be worthy of becoming a literal god and assist the Father in "bringing to pass the immortality and eternal life of man" (Moses 1:39). Gospel Principles, an official book of the LDS Church, states that God the Father was a mortal on another earth the same as Jesus Christ was, and like Jesus was resurrected. Following that example, Latter-day Saints hope to attain same godhood status, while eternally worshiping the Father and the Son (Gospel Principles, chapter 47). In 1977, church president Spencer W. Kimball said, concerning this doctrine of exaltation: "We remember the numerous scriptures which, concentrated in a single line, were said by a former prophet, Lorenzo Snow: 'As man is, God once was; and as God is, man may become.' This is a power available to us as we reach perfection and receive the experience and power to create, to organize, to control native elements. How limited we are now! We have no power to force the grass to grow, the plants to emerge, the seeds to develop.

The Latter-Day Saint movement teaches the existence of three "degrees of glory." As well, for the most evil of people there is outer darkness, a "kingdom of no glory". Outer darkness is considered to be the second death or spiritual death, for those few souls who know a fullness of truth and openly rebel and fight against God. The other three degrees of glory have been labeled the telestial kingdom, the terrestrial kingdom, and the celestial kingdom, with the celestial kingdom itself consisting of "three heavens or degrees" (see Doctrine and Covenants 131). This afterlife is what Latter-Day Saints believe comes after an individual's resurrection and judgment. Some individuals will be resurrected before or at the second coming of Jesus, while others will be resurrected years later.

Members of the LDS Church believe all three kingdoms, celestial, terrestrial and telestial, are kingdoms of glory. They are all places of glory suitable to the individuals that will reside in them, based on the desires of their hearts. The church further teaches that baptism performed by the proper authority is required to enter the celestial kingdom.

=== Conversion and proselytization ===
As a general rule, Jews refrain from active proselytizing, and some Jewish denominations discourage conversion. In Judaism, conversion is not a requirement nor is it a prerequisite for goodness or salvation, and if persons truly wish to convert to Judaism, they will seek out communities and rabbis which they feel comfortable with and begin the process there. Conversion to Judaism involves extensive instruction in Jewish law, the renunciation of other religious affiliations, immersion in a mikveh, and, for males, circumcision. If the potential male convert is already circumcised, a procedure which is known as hatafat dam brit is performed, in which blood is drawn from his penis. Orthodox Judaism also requires acceptance of the entire code of Jewish Law.

The LDS Church operates a widespread proselytizing program, and its missionaries are encouraged to invite others to repent and be baptized. Baptism not only carries membership in the church, it also, according to Latter-Day Saint beliefs, carries the blessings of the covenants which were given to the House of Israel. In order to be baptized, individuals must agree to abide by the Word of Wisdom and the law of chastity, agree to pay tithes, attend church meetings, and declare that they have repented of their sins. Like most Christian churches, the Latter Day Saint movement does not require circumcision because circumcision was done away with when Jesus Christ fulfilled the Law of Moses. By being baptized, members are covenanting with God in order to be "circumcised of heart", which means that they are covenanting to have a broken heart and a contrite spirit in order to live in accordance with the gospel.

Doctrine and Covenants instructs the elders to teach the gospel to all nations, but it instructs them to go to the Gentiles first, and then, it instructs them to go to the Jews.

Two Jewish families had been converted to Mormonism during Joseph Smith's lifetime. Frederick Levi and his family were baptized in 1837 in Canada, Alexander Neibaur and his family were baptized in 1838.

There has not been much proselytizing among the Jews, partially because of the teachings about the destiny of the Jews. Early LDS prophets, such as Brigham Young and Wilford Woodruff, taught the belief that Jewish people could not be truly converted because of the curse which resulted from Jewish deicide. However, after the establishment of the state of Israel, many LDS members felt that the Jewish people should join the LDS Church. During the 1950s, the LDS Church established several missions which specifically targeted Jewish people in several cities in the United States.

=== Water purification ===
==== Mikveh ====
To achieve a state of ritual purification, observant Jews immerse in a Mikveh. Certain kinds of utensils and other objects are also immersed (this practice should not be confused with the physical cleaning required for kashrut).

The most common use of the Mikveh is the practice of immersion after menstruation, miscarriage, or childbirth. This immersion marks the end of a period of sexual separation, and the woman's rejoining with her husband. It is also required that a woman immerse before her wedding. Some men use the Mikvah regularly, either daily, weekly, or before Yom Kippur. This is especially true in Hasidic circles. It is also required for Conversion into Orthodox Judaism for both sexes.

Jewish laws with regard to Mikveh are extensive. The most notable aspect of these laws is that a Mikveh must be filled with "living water," namely, water that has come directly from the earth in the form of caught rainwater or spring water (water flowing in a river or stream is also acceptable in some cases). Once water has been carried in a vessel or run through a pipe, it is no longer considered "living." Additionally, immersion must be complete (including the head and hair), and there can be nothing between the water and the person immersing—not only clothing, but also makeup and jewelry are removed. The common practice is to wash thoroughly before immersion (to remove any dirt or dead skin on the body), and to enter the Mikveh while still wet (to avoid any air bubbles that might be trapped on the skin or in the hair).

Unlike baptism, immersion is a private event—unless a physical handicap makes it impossible, the person undergoing immersion enters the Mikveh alone, and says any appropriate prayers themselves. When performed as part of Conversion to Orthodox Judaism, the act of immersion needs to be witnessed by a Beth-din of three Rabbis; however, the person immerses him/herself.

"Symbolic" immersions, where only drops of water are applied, where "carried" water is used, or where the immerser wears any kind of clothing or underclothing, are not considered valid immersions under Jewish law. Jews do not practice or recognize any kind of "Proxy" immersion, where one person immerses in the place of another person (living or dead).

==== Baptism ====
Baptism is a water purification ritual where one is immersed in water. The practice of purification via immersion exists in many cultures. The word baptize derives from the Greek word βάπτειν (the infinitive; also listed as the 1st person singular present active indicative βαπτίζω, which loosely means "to dip, bathe, or wash").

The Christian ritual of baptism traces back to the baptism of Jesus by John the Baptist, who the Bible says baptized Jesus in the Jordan River. Latter-Day Saint belief holds that baptisms were performed in Adam and Eve's day.

Baptism is a required ordinance and ritual cleansing process when joining the LDS Church, and is considered to be a purification process in one's conversion. In the event of one's excommunication or adoption of another faith, individuals are required to be rebaptized when returning to the church. Baptism is also seen as symbolic of the death and resurrection of Jesus Christ with the water representing the grave. After the one being baptized is determined to be worthy through an interview with their priesthood leader, he is dressed in white clothing, symbolizing the purification of the baptism. The ordinance is performed by a priest of the Aaronic priesthood or any holder of the Melchizedek priesthood. Latter-Day Saint children are not baptized until they turn eight years old, which is considered to be the age of accountability.

In the past, it was common for Latter Day Saints to be re-baptized for health, or as a re-affirmation of belief. This practice slowly diminished and is no longer practiced by any of the mainstream denominations.

==== Washing and anointing ====
In the Latter-Day Saint movement, washing and anointing is an ordinance that symbolizes ritual cleansing and anointing to be a king or queen in heaven. In the LDS Church, the ritual is performed in temples. The ordinance of washing and anointing symbolizes the ritual cleansing of priests that took place at Israel's Tabernacle, the temple of Solomon, and later temples in Jerusalem (see Exod. 28:40–42, 29:4–9, 29:20–21, 29:29–30, 30:18–21).

=== Marriage ===
==== Polygamy in Judaism ====
The Hebrew Bible recounts several cases of polygamy among the ancient Hebrews. One source of polygamy was the practice of levirate marriage, wherein a man was required to marry and support his brother's widow.

Ashkenazi Jewry has not practiced polygamy since Rabbenu Gershom's ban in the 11th century. Some Sephardi and Mizrahi groups, in particular those from Yemen and Iran (where polygamy is the cultural norm) discontinued polygamy relatively recently for secular reasons. When these groups immigrated to the State of Israel, existing polygamous families were "grandfathered" in. Polygamous marriage is banned in the State of Israel, however, and no new polygamous marriages are permitted among those groups.

==== Polygamy in the Latter-Day Saint movement ====
See main articles: Mormonism and polygamy, Origin of Latter Day Saint polygamy, Mormon fundamentalism, Polygamy in Christianity.

Early in its history, the LDS Church practiced polygamy and referred to it as "plural marriage". The practice of polygamy was introduced by Joseph Smith and it was canonized in scripture as being from "the Lord thy God ... the Alpha and Omega" (Doctrine and Covenants 132:1, 2, 66). It was publicly acknowledged by the church in 1852. The Reorganized Church of Jesus Christ of Latter Day Saints, now known as the Community of Christ, rejected polygamy and in 1860, they established an independent church under the leadership of Joseph Smith III, the eldest son of the founding leader.

The practice of polygamy led to opposition to the LDS Church and it also led to the enactment of anti-polygamy laws in the United States. (The U.S. Congress made the practice illegal in U.S. territories in 1862.) Many members of the church fled to Canada or Mexico in an attempt to set up communities which would be free from prosecution. Although Latter-day Saints believed that plural marriage was protected as a religious practice by the United States Constitution, opponents used it to delay Utah's statehood until 1896. Increasingly harsh anti-polygamy legislation stripped church members of their rights as citizens, revoked the right to vote for female members of the church, disincorporated the church, and permitted the seizure of church property until the church formally discontinued the practice with the 1890 Manifesto.

National attention in the United States focused on polygamy in the church in the early-20th century during the House hearings on Representative-elect B. H. Roberts and Senate hearings on Senator-elect Reed Smoot (the Smoot Hearings). This caused church president Joseph F. Smith to issue the "Second Manifesto" against polygamy in 1904. Since that time, it has been church policy to excommunicate any member either practicing or openly advocating the practice of polygamy.

The ban on polygamy resulted in a schism within the LDS Church, with various Mormon fundamentalist groups leaving the church and continuing to practice polygamy. Collectively, such groups now comprise less than three tenths of one percent of the total membership of the Latter-Day Saint Movement. Among these groups, polygamy currently persists in Utah and neighboring states, and it is also practiced by isolated individuals with no organized church affiliation. The largest church which supports polygamy is the Fundamentalist Church of Jesus Christ of Latter-Day Saints, and it is believed to have about 10,000 members. According to one source, there are as many as 37,000 Mormon fundamentalists, and less than half of them live in polygamous households. Most of the polygamy is believed to be restricted to about a dozen extended groups of polygamous Mormon fundamentalists.

=== Divisions ===
Judaism encompasses a spectrum of observance with several recognized branches: Hasidic Judaism, Haredi Judaism (often referred to as "ultra-Orthodox"), Orthodox Judaism, Conservative Judaism, Reform Judaism, Reconstructionist Judaism, Karaite Judaism, and Humanistic Judaism. Further divisions exist within the divisions.

Approximately 98 percent of Latter Day Saint adherents are members of the LDS Church; however, there are several other groups, such as the Community of Christ and numerous smaller churches within Mormon fundamentalism. The second largest group, the Community of Christ, refer to themselves as Latter Day Saints but not as Mormons, though they do continue to use the Book of Mormon as scripture. The doctrine of the Community of Christ doctrine has changed markedly since their reorganization by Joseph Smith III. Two major changes have been the acceptance of the trinitarian concept of God and ordaining women to the priesthood. Fundamentalist Mormons, in contrast, claim adherence to traditional beliefs and practices that have been rejected or changed by the LDS Church.

== Jewish symbolism in the Latter-Day Saint movement ==
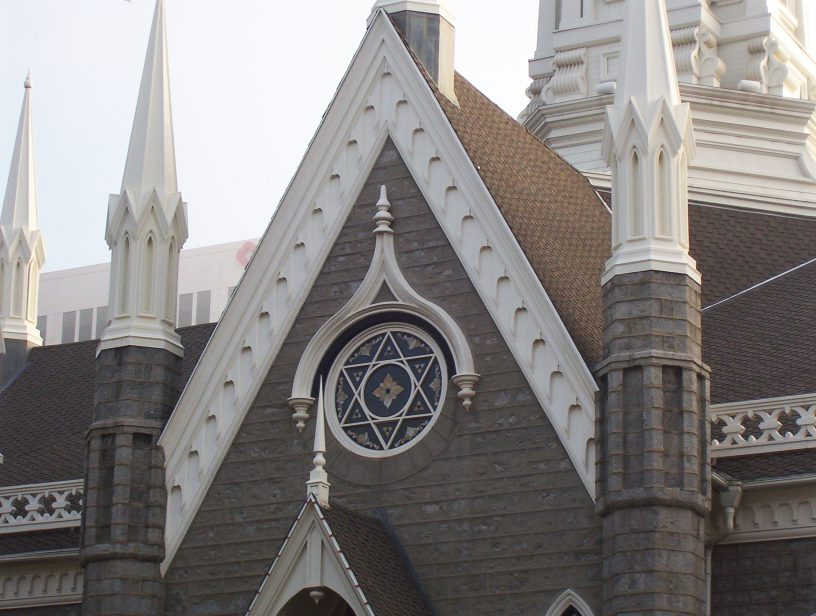
Detail of Salt Lake Assembly Hall

The LDS Church includes among its traditional symbols the Star of David, which has been the symbol of Judaism since at least the 13th century. For the LDS Church, it represents the divine Israelite covenant, Israelite regathering, and affinity with Judaism; a Star of David is prominently depicted in a stained glass window in the landmark Salt Lake Assembly Hall.

== Jewish presence in Utah ==
Not long after LDS Church members reached the Salt Lake Valley, adherents of Judaism also arrived in the area. Alexander Neibaur, a Jewish convert to the LDS Church, arrived in 1848. The first permanent Jewish family in Utah is thought to be Julius Gerson Brooks and his wife, Isabell. The first Jewish cemetery in Salt Lake City, Utah, was on land donated by Brigham Young in 1869, and the first Reform synagogue in Salt Lake was funded by the LDS Church. Inspired by the Jewish back-to-the-land movement, Eastern European Jewish immigrants from Philadelphia and New York established the Clarion colony in Sanpete County in 1910. The colony was organized by the Jewish Agricultural and Colonial Association, and with approximately 200 individuals at its height, was one of the largest Jewish farming colony initiatives of its era.

Simon Bamberger, the fourth Governor of Utah (1917–1921) was Jewish; antisemitic publications targeting Bamberger were denounced by most Utahns. B. H. Roberts, a politician and church leader, supported Bamberger's campaign by nominating him for the governor.

== Baptism for the dead ==
A longtime practice of the LDS Church has been to vicariously baptize their relatives, stemming from the belief that all individuals must receive all saving ordinances to achieve exaltation. Under church theology, vicarious performance of the ordinance of baptism and other temple ordinances does not automatically make a deceased individual a Latter-day Saint, but rather allows the person (believed by Latter-day Saints to be alive in the afterlife) the option of freely accepting or rejecting the ordinances performed on their behalf. Latter-day Saints do not claim the power to compel acceptance of vicarious ordinances or change a deceased person's religious affiliation against his will.

From time to time, and contrary to church policy, Latter-day Saint genealogists have submitted the names of other prominent individuals, including at one-point victims of the Holocaust. Official policy states that church members submit the names of their own relatives for these types of ordinances, and requires that permission of the closest living relative be obtained for any baptism that is to be performed for deceased individuals born within the last 95 years. Regardless, some baptisms were performed on behalf of Holocaust victims. When this information became public, it generated vocal criticism of the Church from Jewish groups, who found this ritual to be insulting and insensitive. In 1995, in part as a result of public pressure, church leaders promised to put new policies into place that would help stop the practice, unless specifically requested or approved by the surviving spouse, children or parents of the victims.

In late 2002, information surfaced that members of the church had not stopped the practice of baptizing Jewish Holocaust victims despite directives from the church leadership. Criticism once again arose from Jewish groups. The Los Angeles-based Simon Wiesenthal Center is on record as opposing the vicarious baptism of Holocaust victims. Rabbi Marvin Hier of the center stated, "If these people did not contact the Latter-Day Saints themselves, the adage should be: Don't call me, I'll call you. With the greatest of respect to them, we do not think they are the exclusive arbitrators of who is saved." Recently, church leaders have agreed to meet with leaders of the World Gathering of Jewish Holocaust Survivors.

In December 2002, independent researcher Helen Radkey published a report showing that the church's 1995 promise to remove Jewish Nazi victims from its International Genealogical Index (IGI) was not sufficient; her research of the church's database uncovered the names of about 19,000 who had a 40 to 50 percent chance of having "the potential to be Holocaust victims ... in Russia, Poland, France, and Austria."

Genealogist Bernard Kouchel conducted a search of the IGI and discovered that many well-known Jewish people have been vicariously baptized, including Rashi, Maimonides, Albert Einstein, Menachem Begin, Irving Berlin, Marc Chagall, and Gilda Radner. Some permissions may have been obtained, but there is currently no system in place to verify that these permissions were obtained, which has angered many in various religious and cultural communities.

In 2004, Schelly Talalay Dardashti, Jewish genealogy columnist for The Jerusalem Post, noted that some Jews, even those with no Latter-Day Saint descendants, are being rebaptized after being removed from the rolls. In an interview, D. Todd Christofferson, a church official, told The New York Times that it was not feasible for the church to continuously monitor the archives to ensure that no new Jewish names appear.

On April 11, 2005, Jewish and church officials met and created a joint Jewish/Mormon committee with the goal of preventing future issues. The committee met intermittently over the next few years. On September 1, 2010, Jewish and leaders from the LDS Church issued a joint statement "acknowledging that concerns between members of both groups over [the] sensitive doctrinal issue have been eliminated." However, in February 2012, the issue re-emerged after it was found that the parents of Holocaust survivor and Jewish rights advocate Simon Wiesenthal were added to the FamilyTree genealogical database.

== Latter-Day Saint movement's views on Jews ==
According to Armand Mauss, most LDS members simultaneously hold beliefs that encourage them to show a feeling of religious affinity for the Jews along with beliefs that encourage them to show a feeling of religious hostility towards Jews, beliefs that are in line with orthodox LDS teachings. Most LDS members believe that Jews are God's chosen people and they also believe that LDS Church members and Jews share a common and literal Israelite ancestry, an ancestry which was associated with an affinity for Jews. However, most LDS members also believe that God is perpetually punishing Jews for their part in the crucifixion of Jesus Christ and they will not be forgiven until they are converted.

=== Claims of House of Israel descent ===
Latter-Day Saints consider themselves to be the descendants of the biblical patriarchs Abraham, Isaac, and Jacob (also known as "Israel") or they consider themselves to be adoptees into the House of Israel, and contemporary Latter-Day Saints use the terms "House of Israel" and "House of Joseph" when they refer to themselves.

The Book of Mormon states that the family of the Tribe of Manasseh and the family of the Tribe of Ephraim migrated from Jerusalem to an unknown location in the Americas. According to Mormon doctrine, this migration fulfilled the prophecy of Jacob on his son, Joseph: "Joseph is a fruitful bough, even a fruitful bough by a well; whose branches run over the wall" (Genesis 49:22). The Book of Mormon also states that members of the Tribe of Judah came to the Americas after they were defeated by Babylon in around 600 BCE.

Additionally, Alma 16:13 of the Book of Mormon specifically contains the Greek word "synagogues"':

"And Alma and Amulek went forth preaching repentance to the people in their temples, and in their sanctuaries, and also in their synagogues, which were built after the manner of the Jews."

The official position of the LDS Church is that those who have accepted the teachings of the church or those who are members of the Latter Day Saint movement are primarily from the House of Joseph, either by blood lineage or by adoption, when the recipient is not a literal descendant of Jacob, who is also known as Israel. Individual church members are told about their tribal affiliation through a patriarchal blessing. The LDS Church teaches the belief that all of the tribes exist within their numbers, but it does not teach the belief that members of every tribe live in every country. By far, Ephraim and Manasseh are the two largest tribes in the LDS Church.

Tribal affiliation is usually not discussed in everyday church life, and all church members worship together, regardless of tribal affiliation. Usually, the knowledge of one's tribal affiliation is only shared with one's immediate family.

In modern Jewish culture, by contrast, knowledge of individual tribal affiliation has been lost since antiquity, except in the case of Levites and Cohens, where such knowledge is relevant to religious practice. However, some Jewish families hold family traditions of descent from other tribes. The Sephardi Chief Rabbi of Israel has recognized the Beta Israel of Ethiopia as the Tribe of Dan, and he has also recognized the Bene Menashe of India as the Tribe of Menasseh. The Bene Israel of India and the Lemba people of Africa claim descent from Kohanim—according to a government report, these claims are supported by DNA analysis.

The position of those who consider themselves Jewish with regard to Latter-Day Saints is similar to their feelings about other Christian groups—while peaceful coexistence is strongly desired, attempts at conversion are considered inappropriate and unwanted.

Some Jewish groups like Jews for Judaism reject wholesale the claims of the LDS Church that the conversion to the church reveals a familial connection between the convert and ethnic Jews. They base their position on Judaism's interpretation of Hebrew scriptures and advances in biological science, saying, "No amount of genetic testing or DNA sampling will show the Jewish people and the Latter-day Saints to be of the same ancestry. The Latter-day Saints are simply not of Israelite origins.... For all their assertions and genealogical research, the Latter-day Saints are not descendants of Joseph and can never join Judah in fulfillment of a nonexistent prophecy."

On similar grounds they reject claims from the LDS Church that Native Americans have Hebrew origins. They also critique church scripture for, in their view, an erroneous use of the word "Jew", saying "If the American Indians are descendants of Manasseh that would make them Israelites but not specifically Jews. The term 'Jews' is associated with the tribe of Judah and those of Israelite descent who practice Judaism. ... [I]n the Book of Mormon the inhabitants of what are now the Americas are referred to as descendants of Jews although the dominant group supposedly stems from Manasseh. Thus, Nephi is alleged to have written, 'And thus shall the remnant of our seed know concerning us, how that we came out from Jerusalem, and that they are descendants of the Jews' (2 Nephi 30:4)."

Despite this objection, the Biblical use of the term 'Jew' while associated with the tribe of Judah, is not synonymous with the tribe of Judah. Rather, the term 'Jew' means someone who is from the Southern Kingdom of Judah (as opposed to the Northern Kingdom of Israel). For example, Mordechi and Esther were 'Jews', despite being from the tribe of Benjamin. Esther 2:5 reads, "Now in Shushan, the palace there was a certain Jew, whose name was Mordecai, the son of Jair, the son of Shimei, the son of Kish, a Benjamite:" Lehi and his family were inhabitants of the Southern Kingdom of Judah, and as such were 'Jews'.

=== The LDS Church and the State of Israel ===
The LDS Church has at least three congregations in Israel: the Jerusalem Branch in Jerusalem, a branch in Tel Aviv, a branch in Be'er Sheva, (and formerly: the Galilee Branch in Tiberias). There are also branches in nearby Amman and Beirut. Latter-day Saints in Israel hold their worship services on Saturday, the Jewish Sabbath.

"Missionaries are allowed to proselytize, although the LDS Church voluntarily refrains from proselytizing under an agreement with the Government."

Brigham Young University (BYU) has a study center in Jerusalem that is active in research and cultural activities (e.g., classical music concerts). Its creation was initially protested by Haredi Jewish groups which claimed, despite reassurances from the church, that it would be a center of proselytizing activities. BYU was allowed to open the center in Jerusalem only after promising the mayor that no proselytizing would take place and that all students would be foreigners. The courses at the center, attracting students from BYU and other institutions of higher learning in the US who wanted to do credit coursework in Israel, have previously been temporarily suspended due to security concerns.

=== Jewish curse and gathering ===
The Book of Mormon teaches that Jesus came to the Jews because they were the only nation which was wicked enough to crucify him. The Book of Mormon characterizes the works of the Jews in this manner: "for their works were works of darkness, and their doings were doings of abominations". It also teaches that the Jewish people were punished with death and destruction "according to their iniquities". It teaches that God gave the gentiles the power to scatter the Jews and it connects their future gathering to their belief that Jesus is the Christ. According to the Doctrine & Covenants, after Jesus reveals himself to the Jews, they will weep because of their iniquities. It warns that if the Jewish people do not repent, "I [will] come and smite the whole earth with a curse, and all flesh [will] be consumed before me".

On its title page, the Book of Mormon, part of the scripture of Latter-day Saints, states that its purpose is "the convincing of the Jew and the Gentile that Jesus is the Christ."

The Doctrine and Covenants, a collection of canonized prophecies of Joseph Smith and other Latter-Day Saint leaders, contains prophecies regarding the return of the Jewish people to the land of Israel:

"And the children of Judah may begin to return to the lands which thou didst give to Abraham, their father."

In addition, it states:

"Let them, therefore, who are among the Gentiles flee unto Zion. And let them who be of Judah flee unto Jerusalem, unto the mountains of the Lord’s house."

Joseph Smith taught that the generation of Jews that crucified Jesus were corrupt like his generation.

Brigham Young, an early LDS prophet, taught the belief that the Jewish people were in a middle-tier of cursed lineages, below Lamanites (Native Americans) but above Cain's descendants (Black people), because they had crucified Jesus and the gathering in Jerusalem would be part of their penance for it. As part of the curse, they would not receive the gospel and if anyone converted to the church it would be proof that they were not actually Jewish. As more Jews began to assimilate into Northern America and Western Europe, church leaders began to soften their stance, saying instead that Lord was gradually withdrawing the curse and the Jews were beginning to believe in Christ, but that it wouldn't fully happen until Jesus returned. The Holocaust and the threats of Nazism were seen as fulfillment of prophecy that the Jews would be punished. Likewise, the establishment of Israel and the influx of Jewish people were seen as fulfillment of prophecy that they Jewish people would be gathered and the curse lifted.

In 1982, Bruce R. McConkie published a book titled The Millennial Messiah, which devotes an entire chapter to "The Jews and the Second Coming". It states:

"Let this fact be engraved in the eternal records with a pen of steel: the Jews were cursed, and smitten, and cursed anew, because they rejected the gospel, cast out their Messiah, and crucified their King. ... Let the spiritually illiterate suppose what they may, it was the Jewish denial and rejection of the Holy One of Israel, whom their fathers worshiped in the beauty and holiness, that has made them a hiss and byword in all nations and that has taken millions of their fair sons and daughters to untimely graves. ... What sayeth the holy word? "They shall be scourged by all people, because they crucify the God of Israel, and turn the hearts aside, rejecting signs and wonders, and the power and glory of the God of Israel. And because they turn their hearts aside,…and have despised the Holy One of Israel, they shall wander in the flesh, and perish, and become a hiss and by-word and be hated among all nations.: (1 Ne. 19:13-14; 2 Ne. 6:9-11.) Such is the prophetic word of Nephi."

After the LDS Church began to give the priesthood to all males regardless of race and it also began to de-emphasize the importance of race, instead, it adopted a more universal emphasis. This has led to a spectrum of views on how LDS members interpret scripture and previous teachings. According to research by Armand Mauss, most LDS members believe that God is perpetually punishing Jews for their part in the crucifixion of Jesus Christ and they will not be forgiven until they are converted.

=== Treatment of the Jews ===
The Book of Mormon contains a specific condemnation of antisemitism:

"Yea, and ye need not any longer hiss, nor spurn, nor make game of the Jews, nor of any remnant of the house of Israel; for behold, the Lord remembereth his covenant unto them, and he will do unto them according to that which he hath sworn."3 Nephi 29:8

In a May 2, 1976, speech at the Southern Alberta Jubilee Auditorium, Ezra Taft Benson declared that he cherished his friendship with the Jews of Israel:

"Among some of my most cherished experiences and recollections are the fond association I have enjoyed in past years with the Jewish people in the United States and the land of Israel. I have visited Israel three times. I have met hundreds of government officials, farmers, business and trade people, and leaders in professions. No visits have been more impressive than the visits with David Ben-Gurion, Levi Eshkol, and Moshe Dayan."

Benson called on Mormons to understand, learn from, and befriend the Jewish people:

"But our affinity toward modern Judah is not prompted merely out of mutual suffering; it is prompted out of a knowledge of our peculiar relationships together—relationships which claim a common heritage. Jeremiah has prophesied that in the latter times "the house of Judah shall walk with the house of Israel, and they shall come together." (Jer. 3:18.) My prayer is that because of evenings spent together like this one, this prophecy will come to be fulfilled. We need to know more about the Jews, and the Jews ought to know more about the Mormons. When we understand one another, then perhaps you will understand why Ben-Gurion said, "There are no people in the world who understand the Jews like the Mormons."

Benson then criticizes the Crusades' violence: "Some of the most evil of those deeds were perpetrated upon the remaining Jews in Palestine in the name of Christianity during the Crusades. Will Durrant [sic] has correctly written of this sad chapter of human suffering, 'No other people has ever known so long an exile, or so hard a fate.'"

Benson laments the suffering and "ruins of what was the largest Jewish ghetto in Europe in the Jewish section of Warsaw, Poland":

"Here 250,000 descendants of Judah had lived prior to the war. Under the Nazi rule, through forced labor, Jews were required to build a wall around the ghetto. Later some 150,000 Jews from other parts of Europe were brought into that area. The Germans first tried to starve them out, but when that did not work, they transported over 310,000 Jews to the extermination camps. When Himmler found that there were still some 60,000 Jews alive in the ghetto, he ordered their "resettlement." When they forcibly resisted, the German S. S. General Stroop ordered the tanks, artillery, flamethrowers, and dynamite squads on the ghetto. The extermination which was to have taken three days lasted four weeks. The final report by the general read, "Total number of Jews dealt with: 56,065, including both Jews caught and Jews whose extermination can be proved." This report left 36,000 Jews unaccounted for which were no doubt claimed by the gas chambers. (William L. Shirer, The Rise and Fall of the Third Reich, Greenwich, Conn.: Fawcett Publishers, 1965, p. 1272.)

"I have visited some of the concentration camps, the mass graves, and the crematoriums where, it is estimated, six million of the sons and daughters of Judah lost their lives, reducing their world population from seventeen to eleven million.

"I have been impressed to tears as I visited some of these wanderers, those persecuted and driven sons of our Heavenly Father, my brethren of Judah. Yes, the prophecies regarding the dispersion and suffering of Judah have been fulfilled. But the gathering and reestablishment of the Jews was also clearly predicted.

== See also ==
- Catholic Church and Judaism
- Christian observances of Jewish holidays
- Christian views on the Old Covenant
- Christianity and Biblical prophecy
- Christianity and Judaism
- Jewish views on religious pluralism
- Judaizers
- Messianic Judaism
- Mormon view of the House of Joseph
- Mormonism and Christianity
- Protestantism and Judaism
- Relations between Eastern Orthodoxy and Judaism
- Sacred Name Movement
- Supersessionism
- Tabernacle (LDS Church)
