= Jewish deicide =

Belief that Jews bear collective responsibility for the crucifixion of Jesus

Jewish deicide (Note: From Latin deus ("god") + -cida ("slayer", "one who kills").) is the theological position and the antisemitic trope that as a people, the Jews are collectively responsible for the killing of Jesus, even through the successive generations following his death. The notion arose in early Christianity, and it features in the writings of Justin Martyr and Melito of Sardis as early as the 2nd century. The Biblical passage from Matthew 27 known as the "blood curse" (Matthew 27:24–25) has also been seen as giving voice to the charge of Jewish deicide.

The accusation that the Jews were Christ-killers fed Christian antisemitism and spurred on acts of violence against Jews such as pogroms, massacres of Jews during the Crusades, expulsions of the Jews from England, France, Spain, Portugal and other places, and torture during the Spanish and Portuguese Inquisitions.

In the catechism that was produced by the Council of Trent in the mid-16th century, the Catholic Church rejected the deicide charge and taught the belief that the collectivity of sinful humanity was responsible for the death of Jesus, with Christians having a special responsibility themselves. In the Second Vatican Council (1962–1965), the Catholic Church under Pope Paul VI issued the declaration Nostra aetate that repudiated the idea of a collective, multigenerational Jewish guilt for the crucifixion of Jesus. It declared that the accusation could not be made "against all the Jews, without distinction, then alive, nor against the Jews of today".

Most Protestant churches have never given a binding position on the matter; but some Christian denominations, such as the Episcopal Church in the US, the Presbyterian Church (USA), and the Evangelical Lutheran Church in America have issued official declarations against the accusation.

== Sources ==
=== Matthew 27:24–25 ===
A justification for the charge of Jewish deicide has been sought in Matthew 27:24–25:

So when Pilate saw that he was gaining nothing, but rather that a riot was beginning, he took water and washed his hands before the crowd, saying, "I am innocent of this man's blood; see to it yourselves." And all the people answered, "His blood be on us and on our children!"

The verse which reads: "And all the people answered, 'His blood be on us and on our children!'" is also referred to as the blood curse. In an essay regarding antisemitism, biblical scholar Amy-Jill Levine argues that this passage has caused more suffering throughout Jewish history than any other passage in the New Testament.

=== John 5:16–18 ===
Many also point to the Gospel of John as evidence of Christian charges of deicide. As Samuel Sandmel writes, "John is widely regarded as either the most anti-Semitic or at least the most overtly anti-Semitic of the gospels." Support for this claim comes in several places throughout John, such as in John 5:16–18:

So, because Jesus was doing these things on the Sabbath, the Jews began to persecute him. In his defense Jesus said to them, "My father is always at his work to this very day, and I too am working." For this reason they tried all the more to kill him; not only was he breaking the Sabbath, but he was even calling God his own Father, making himself equal with God.

Some scholars describe this passage as irrefutably referencing and implicating the Jews in deicide, although many, such as scholar Robert Kysar, also argue that part of the severity of this charge comes more from those who read and understand the text than the text itself. John uses the term Ἰουδαῖοι, Ioudaioi, meaning "the Jews" or "the Judeans", as the subject of these sentences. However, the notion that the Jew is meant to represent all Jews is often disputed by scholars who argued that the phrase is to be taken specifically to refer to "Jewish leaders". While the New Testament is often more subtle or leveled in accusations of deicide, many scholars hold that these works cannot be held in isolation, and must be considered in the context of their interpretation by later Christian communities.

==== Historicity of Matthew 27:24–25 ====
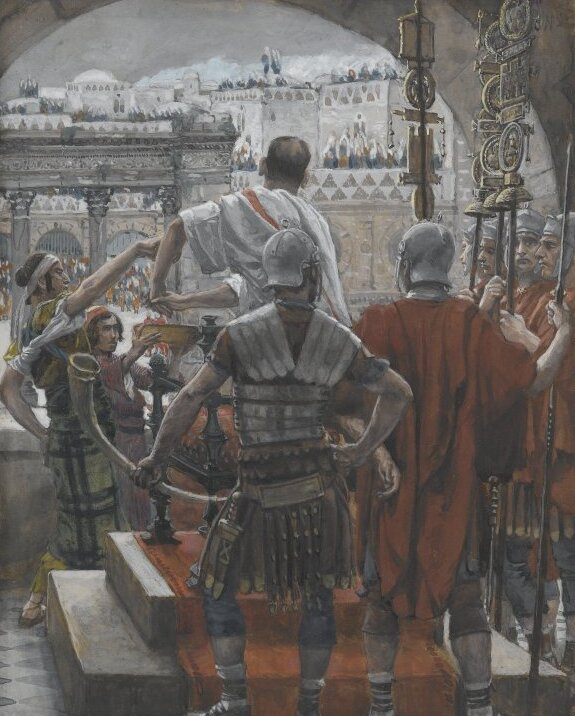
Pilate Washes His Hands, James Tissot

According to the gospel accounts, Jewish authorities in Roman Judea charged Jesus with blasphemy and sought his execution, but lacked the authority to have Jesus put to death (John 18:31), so they took Jesus to Pontius Pilate, the Roman governor of the province, who authorized Jesus's execution (John 19:16). The Jesus Seminar's Scholars Version translation note for John 18:31 adds: "it's illegal for us: The accuracy of this claim is doubtful." It is noted, for example, that Jewish authorities were responsible for the stoning of Saint Stephen in Acts 7:54 and of James the Just in Antiquities of the Jews without the consent of the governor. Josephus however, notes that the execution of James happened while the newly appointed governor Lucceius Albinus "was but upon the road" to assume his office. Also Acts relates that the stoning happened in a lynching-like manner, in the course of Stephen's public criticism of Jews who refused to believe in Jesus.

It has also been suggested that the Gospel accounts may have downplayed the role of the Romans in Jesus's death during a time when Christianity was struggling to gain acceptance among the then pagan or polytheist Roman world. Matthew 27:24–25, quoted above, has no counterpart in the other Gospels and some scholars see it as probably related to the destruction of Jerusalem in AD 70. Swiss Protestant theologian Ulrich Luz described it in 2005 as "redactional fiction" invented by the author of the Gospel of Matthew. Some writers, viewing it as part of Matthew's anti-Jewish polemic, see in it the seeds of later Christian antisemitism.

In his 2011 book, Pope Benedict XVI, besides repudiating placing blame on the Jewish people, interprets the passage found in the Gospel of Matthew which has the "crowd" (this being the translation of the specific original Greek word used in the text) saying "Let his blood be upon us and upon our children" as not referring to the whole Jewish people, but only to the group of supporters of the rebel Barabbas present at the trial. The other group identified by the pope as standing behind Jesus's trial is the "Temple aristocracy", another clearly defined category.

=== Historicity of Barabbas ===
Some biblical scholars, including Benjamin Urrutia and Hyam Maccoby, go a step further by not only doubting the historicity of the blood curse statement in Matthew but also the existence of Barabbas. This theory is based on the fact that Barabbas's full name was given in early writings as Jesus Barabbas, meaning literally Jesus, son of the father. The theory is that this name originally referred to Jesus himself, and that when the crowd asked Pilate to release "Jesus, son of the father" they were referring to Jesus himself, as suggested also by Peter Cresswell. The theory suggests that further details around Barabbas are historical fiction based on a misunderstanding. The theory is disputed by other scholars.

=== Paul's First Letter to the Thessalonians ===
The First Epistle to the Thessalonians also contains accusations of Jewish deicide:

For you, brethren, became imitators of the churches of God in Christ Jesus which are in Judea; for you suffered the same things from your own countrymen as they did from the Jews, who killed both the Lord Jesus and the prophets, and drove us out, and displease God and oppose all men by hindering us from speaking to the Gentiles so that they may be saved. Thus they have constantly been filling up the measure of their sins; but God's wrath has overtaken them at last.

According to historian Jeremy Cohen:

Even before the Gospels appeared, the apostle Paul (or, more probably, one of his disciples) portrayed the Jews as Christ's killers ... But though the New Testament clearly looks to the Jews as responsible for the death of Jesus, Paul and the evangelists did not yet condemn all Jews, by the very fact of their Jewishness, as murderers of the son of God and his messiah. That condemnation, however, was soon to come.

Some scholars believe these verses are a later interpolation not present in the original text. They note how this excerpt contradicts various other statements from Paul's letters, such as his belief that God's promise to the Jews still applies and they will ultimately be saved, as well as his repeated self-identification as a Jew (which are instead treated in this passage as a different group wholly apart from himself). Furthermore, mention of Jews already having experienced divine wrath is seemingly a reference to the destruction of the Second Temple: if true, this would mean that the excerpt was added no earlier than 70 AD, after Paul's death.

=== 2nd century ===
The identification of the death of Jesus as the killing of God is first stated in "God is murdered" as early as AD 167, in a tract bearing the title Peri Pascha that may have been designed to bolster a minor Christian sect's presence in Sardis, where Jews had a thriving community with excellent relations with Greeks, and which is attributed to a Quartodeciman, Melito of Sardis, a statement is made that appears to have transformed the charge that Jews had killed their own Messiah into the charge that the Jews had killed God himself.

He who hung the earth in place is hanged; he who fixed the heavens has been fixed; he who fastened the universe has been fastened to a tree; the Sovereign has been insulted; the God has been murdered; the King of Israel has been put to death by an Israelite right hand. (lines 95–96)

If so, the author would be the first writer in the Lukan-Pauline tradition to raise unambiguously the accusation of deicide against Jews. This text blames the Jews for allowing King Herod and Caiaphas to execute Jesus, despite their calling as God's people (i.e., both were Jewish). It says "you did not know, O Israel, that this one was the firstborn of God". The author does not attribute particular blame to Pontius Pilate, but only mentions that Pilate washed his hands of guilt.

=== 4th century ===
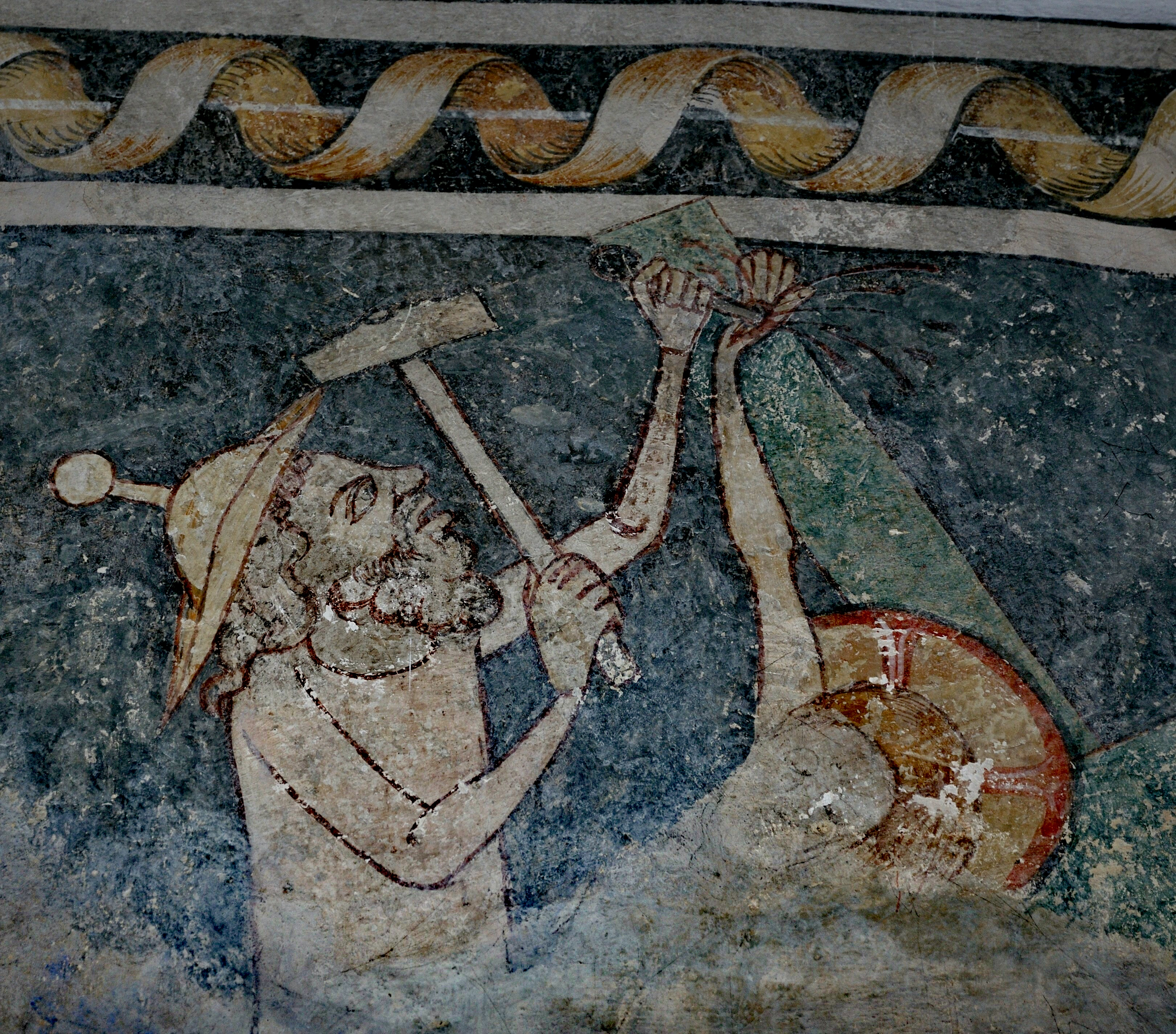
14th century fresco depicting a Jew (as evidenced by his anachronistic hat) nailing Christ to a cross.

John Chrysostom (c. 347 – 407) was an important Early Church Father who served as archbishop of Constantinople and is known for his fanatical antisemitism, collected in his homilies, such as Adversus Judaeos. The charge of Jewish deicide was the cornerstone of his theology, and he was the first to use the term deicide and the first Christian preacher to apply the word deicide to Jews collectively. He held that for this putative 'deicide', there was no expiation, pardon or indulgence possible. The first occurrence of the Latin word deicida occurs in a Latin sermon by Peter Chrysologus (c. 380 – c. 450). In the Latin version he wrote: Iudaeos [invidia] ... fecit esse deicidas, i.e., "[Envy] made the Jews deicides".

== Recent discussions ==
The accuracy of the Gospel accounts' portrayal of Jewish complicity in Jesus's death has been vigorously debated in recent decades, with views which range from a denial of Jewish responsibility to a belief in extensive Jewish culpability. According to the Jesuit scholar Daniel Harrington, the consensus of Jewish and Christian scholars is that there is some Jewish responsibility, regarding not the Jewish people, but regarding only the probable involvement of the high priests in Jerusalem at the time and their allies. Many scholars read the story of the passion as an attempt to take the blame off Pilate and place it on the Jews, one which might have been at the time politically motivated. It is thought possible that Pilate ordered the crucifixion to avoid a riot, for example.

== Talmud and Maimonides ==
Some scholars hold that the synoptic account is compatible with traditions in the Babylonian Talmud.

The writings of Moses Maimonides (a medieval Sephardic Jewish philosopher) mentioned the hanging of a certain Jesus (identified in the sources as Yashu'a) on the eve of Passover. Maimonides considered Jesus as a Jewish renegade in revolt against Judaism; religion commanded the death of Jesus and his students; and Christianity was a religion attached to his name in a later period. In a passage widely censored in pre-modern editions for fear of the way it might feed into very real antisemitic attitudes, Maimonides wrote of "Jesus of Nazareth, who imagined that he was the Messiah, and was put to death by the court" (that is, "by a beth din") Maimonides' position was defended in modern times by Israeli rabbi Zvi Yehuda Kook, who asserted Jewish responsibility and dismissed those who denied it as sycophants.

== Liturgy ==
=== Eastern Christianity ===
The Holy Friday liturgy of the Eastern Orthodox Church, as well as the Byzantine Rite Catholic churches, uses the expression "impious and transgressing people", but the strongest expressions are in the Holy Thursday liturgy, which includes the same chant, after the eleventh Gospel reading, but also speaks of "the murderers of God, the lawless nation of the Jews", and, referring to "the assembly of the Jews", prays: "But give them, Lord, their reward, because they devised vain things against Thee."

=== Western Christianity ===
A liturgy with a similar pattern but with no specific mention of the Jews is found in the Improperia of the Roman Rite of the Catholic Church. A collect for the Jews is also said, traditionally calling for the conversion of the "faithless" and "blind" Jews, although this wording was removed after the Vatican II council. It had sometimes been thought, perhaps incorrectly, that "faithless" (in Latin, perfidis) meant "perfidious", i.e. treacherous.

In the Anglican Church, the 1662 Book of Common Prayer contains a similar collect for "Jews, Turks, Infidels, and Hereticks" for use on Good Friday, though it does not allude to any responsibility for the death of Jesus. Versions of the Improperia also appear in later versions, such as the 1989 Anglican Prayer Book of the Anglican Church of Southern Africa, commonly called The Solemn Adoration of Christ Crucified or The Reproaches. Although not part of Christian dogma, many Christians, including members of the clergy, preached that the Jewish people were collectively guilty for Jesus's death.

=== The Church of Jesus Christ of Latter-day Saints ===
The Church of Jesus Christ of Latter-day Saints (LDS Church) accepts additional scriptures about Jewish deicide. The Book of Mormon teaches the belief that Jesus came to the Jews because they were the only nation which was wicked enough to crucify him. It also teaches that the Jewish people were punished with death and destruction because of their wickedness. It teaches that God gave the gentiles the power to scatter the Jews and it connects their future gathering to their belief that Jesus is the Christ. According to the Doctrine & Covenants, after Jesus reveals himself to the Jews, they will weep because of their iniquities. It warns that if the Jewish people do not repent, the world will be destroyed.

Brigham Young, an early LDS prophet, taught the belief that the Jewish people were in a middle-tier of cursed lineages, below Lamanites (Native Americans) but above Cain's descendants (Black people), because they had crucified Jesus and the gathering in Jerusalem would be part of their penance for it. As part of the curse, they would not receive the gospel and if anyone converted to the church it would be proof that they were not actually Jewish. As more Jews began to assimilate into Northern America and Western Europe, church leaders began to soften their stance, saying instead that the Lord was gradually withdrawing the curse and the Jews were beginning to believe in Christ, but that it would not fully happen until Jesus returned. The Holocaust and the threats of Nazism were seen as fulfillment of prophecy that the Jews would be punished. Likewise, the establishment of Israel and the influx of Jewish people were seen as fulfillment of prophecy that the Jewish people would be gathered and the curse lifted.

In 1978, the LDS Church began to give the priesthood to all males regardless of race and it also began to de-emphasize the importance of race; instead, it adopted a more universal emphasis. This has led to a spectrum of views on how LDS members interpret scripture and previous teachings. According to research by Armand Mauss, most LDS members believe that God is perpetually punishing Jews for their part in the crucifixion of Jesus Christ and they will not be forgiven until they are converted. These views were correlated with Christian hostility towards the Jews. However, these hostile views were often counter-balanced with views that they share a common ancestry with the Jews.

Some Latter-Day Saints may argue against the idea that their scriptures promote Jewish deicide, citing the Second Article of Faith as evidence against the idea of all Jews being punished for Jesus's crucifixion. The Second Article of Faith (contained in The Pearl of Great Price) states that "We believe that men will be punished for their own sins, and not for Adam's transgression".

== Repudiation ==
The Roman Catechism, commissioned by the Council of Trent and published in 1566, rejected the charge and taught a new interpretation, according to which the sins of all humans are responsible for Christ's death. The catechism further argued that Christian sinners are more to blame than the few Jews who were involved, as they "knew not what they did" while Christians claim to know Christ.

In the aftermath of World War II and The Holocaust, Jules Isaac, a French-Jewish historian and a Holocaust survivor, played a seminal role in documenting the antisemitic traditions which existed in the Catholic Church's thinking, instruction and liturgy. The move to draw up a formal document of repudiation gained momentum after Isaac obtained a private audience with Pope John XXIII in 1960. Isaac, influenced by his Catholic friend and mentor, Charles Péguy, referenced the teachings of the council of Trent and the Roman Catechism about the rejection of the Jewish deicide and incorporated them into the Ten Points of Seelisberg. In the Second Vatican Council (1962–1965), the Catholic Church under Pope Paul VI issued the declaration Nostra aetate ("In Our Time"), which among other things repudiated belief in the collective Jewish guilt for the crucifixion of Jesus. Nostra aetate stated that, even though some Jewish authorities and those who followed them called for Jesus' death, the blame for what happened cannot be laid at the door of all Jews living at that time, nor can the Jews in our time be held guilty. It made no explicit mention of Matthew 27:24–25, but only of John 19:6.

On 16 November 1998, the Church Council of the Evangelical Lutheran Church in America adopted a resolution which was prepared by its Consultative Panel on Lutheran–Jewish Relations. The resolution urged that any Lutheran church which was presenting a Passion play should adhere to its Guidelines for Lutheran–Jewish Relations, stating that "the New Testament ... must not be used as a justification for hostility towards present-day Jews", and it also stated that "blame for the death of Jesus should not be attributed to Judaism or the Jewish people."

Pope Benedict XVI also repudiated the Jewish deicide charge in his 2011 book Jesus of Nazareth, in which he interpreted the translation of "ochlos" in Matthew to mean the "crowd", rather than the Jewish people.

== See also ==
- Antisemitic trope
- Christianity and other religions
  - Christianity and Judaism
    - Anabaptist–Jewish relations
    - Antisemitism in Christianity, a form of religious antisemitism
      - Antisemitism and the New Testament
        - Bargain of Judas
    - Catholic Church and Judaism
    - Christian–Jewish reconciliation
    - Christian Zionism
    - Judaism and Mormonism
    - Protestantism and Judaism
    - Relations between Eastern Orthodoxy and Judaism
- Christianity in the Middle East
  - Christianity in Israel
- Christianity and violence
  - History of Christian thought on persecution and tolerance
- Criticism of the Bible
- Criticism of Christianity
- Criticism of Israel
  - Anti-Zionism
  - Legitimacy of the State of Israel
    - Calls for the destruction of Israel
      - Temple denial
- Criticism of Judaism
  - Anti-Judaism
- Faithful Word Baptist Church
- Geography of antisemitism
- History of antisemitism
  - Persecution of Jews
    - Expulsions and exoduses of Jews
- History of Christianity
- Jewish views on religious pluralism
- Jews as the chosen people
  - Supersessionism
- Judaizers
  - Christian observances of Jewish holidays
  - Christian views on the Old Covenant
  - Groups claiming affiliation with Israelites
- Life of Jesus
- Moses and Monotheism by Sigmund Freud
- Opposition to antisemitism
- Philosemitism
- Religious perspectives on Jesus
  - Jesus in Christianity
  - Jewish views on Jesus
- Romani crucifixion legend
- Stereotypes of Jews
- Westboro Baptist Church
