= House of Joseph (LDS Church) =

Designation applied by members of The Church of Jesus Christ of Latter-day Saints

The House of Joseph (sometimes referred to as the Tribe of Joseph) is a designation which members of the Church of Jesus Christ of Latter-day Saints (LDS Church) apply to the ancient "birthright" tribe of the house of Israel (Jacob) as it is described in the Old Testament, made up of the tribes of Ephraim and Manasseh. The tribes' namesakes — the two sons of Joseph of Egypt — are first mentioned in Genesis 41:50-52.

Members of the LDS Church believe themselves, in a general sense, to be members of the House of Israel, many of whom believe themselves also to be the literal bloodline descendants of Ephraim, Joseph of Egypt's youngest son, but inheritor, notwithstanding, of Israel's "firstborn" birthright blessings. These modern Josephites claim, however, that many in their ranks are also of the tribe of Manasseh, Joseph's eldest son and a joint-recipient of the 'double portion' of Jacob's birthright blessing upon the heads of his grandsons.

Church members therefore consider themselves to be a 'covenant people', specially called or foreordained from 'eternity' (or before earth's creation, which they call 'premortality', or pre-existence). They profess to attend to sacred saving ordinances as they existed anciently in God's holy temple — "the place of the covenant" — with sacred responsibilities and obligations for God-given 'birthright' blessings that are contingent upon upright living.

Young people within the church are often referred to as 'youth of the noble birthright' — a designation inspired by lyrics from one of the faith's time-honored hymns.

Much of the story of the House of Joseph, according to Latter-day Saints, is reflected in ancient ancestral prophecies, including those made by the patriarch Jacob and his son, Joseph of Egypt (many of them now restored through revelation by the LDS faith's founding prophet). But that story is also relayed in messianic Jewish tradition and legend concerning one 'Messiah ben Joseph' that, for some Latter-day Saints, mirrors the earthly mission of Joseph Smith, the faith's founder, who in the LDS worldview stands preeminent among the heirs of Joseph's house.

The house of Joseph is mentioned in the Bible several times, notably in Numbers 13:11; Deuteronomy 27:12; Judges 1:22-35; and Ezekiel 47:13. There is also an allusion to the house of Joseph in Psalms 80:1.

== Patriarchal primogeniture ==
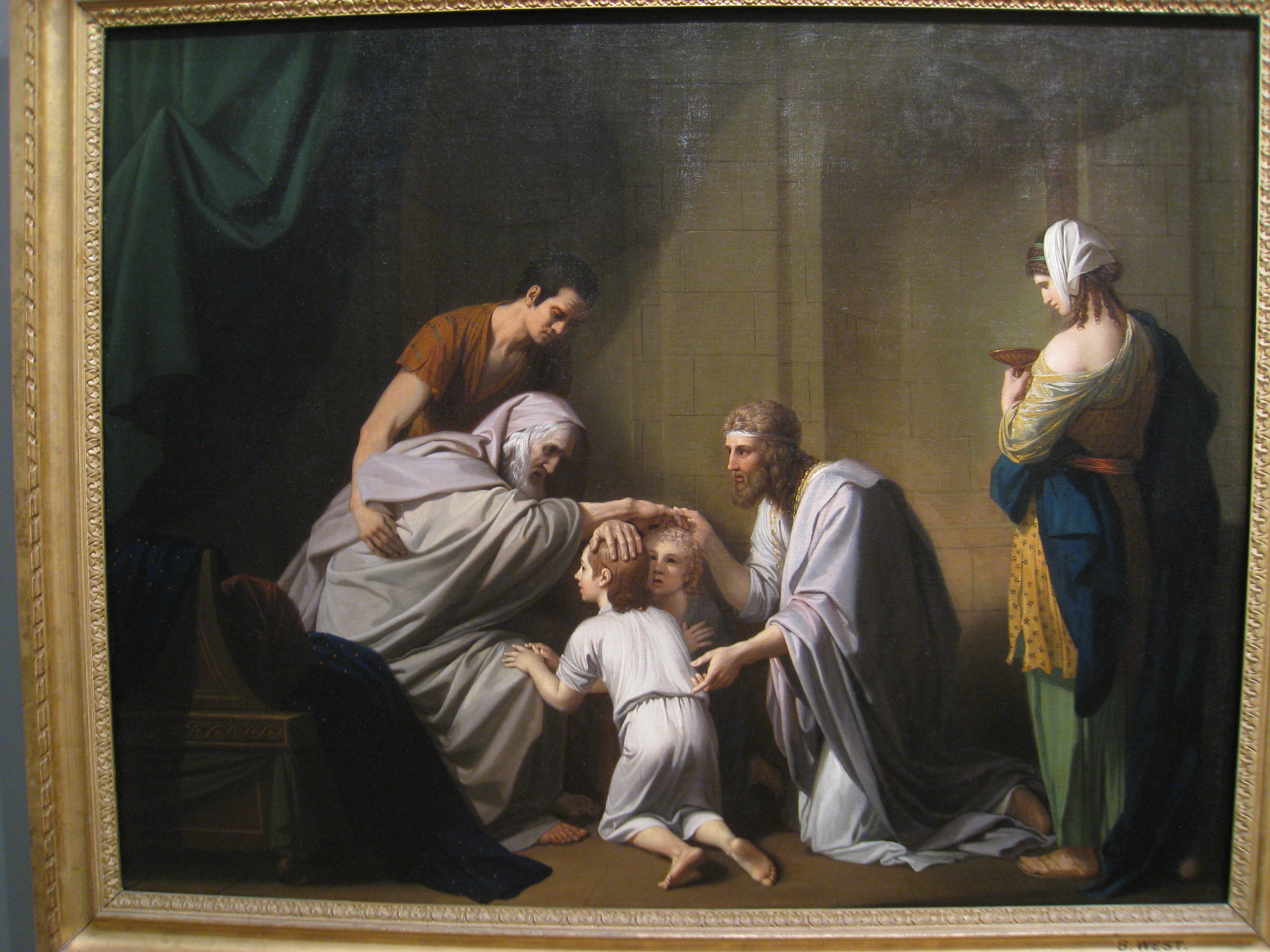
Jacob blessing Manasseh and Ephraim.

Let the blessing come upon the head of Joseph ... [upon] him that was separated from his brethren. His glory is like the firstling of his bullock, and his horns are like the horns of the wild-ox: with them he shall push the people together to the ends of the earth: and they are the ten thousands of Ephraim, and they are the thousands of Manasseh ... (Deut 33:16-17; see D&C 110:9)

I am a father to Israel, and Ephraim is my firstborn. Hear the word of the Lord, O ye nations, and declare it in the isles afar off, and say, He that scattered Israel will gather him, as a shepherd doth his flock ... (Jer 31:9-10)

Joseph is a father to Ephraim and to all Israel in these last days ... (latter-day prophet Brigham Young, 9 Apr 1837)

According to LDS doctrine, the Twelve Tribes of Israel descended from the twelve sons of the patriarch Jacob (who was later named Israel) and his two wives, Leah and Rachel, and two concubines, Zilpah and Bilhah. Jacob was the last of a line of ancient biblical patriarchs who held the full power of the "blessings of the firstborn", of bechor. But Jacob's firstborn by first wife Leah — Reuben — forfeited by transgression his spiritual inheritance, and it passed instead to the Patriarch's newly sanctioned 'firstborn' son by favored but second wife, Rachel. This son's name was Joseph — a name signifying 'fruitful'.

Leah's second and third sons — Simeon and Levi — likewise, because of murder, forfeited any birthright they may have had, and the 'covenant bloodline' blessing and inheritance of the royal scepter went to Leah's fourth, but Jacob's first righteous son, Judah.

In Genesis, Joseph's sons, Manasseh and Ephraim, are taken to see their dying grandfather, who has 'adopted' them as his own. As with each of his own sons, Israel (Jacob) laid his hands upon the heads of his grandsons to bless them.

But when the aged patriarch laid his left hand upon the elder grandson Manasseh's head and his right hand on the younger Ephraim's head, Joseph, seeing that his father had made a mistake, switched his hands. But Israel refused and said:

I know it, my son, I know it: he [Manasseh] also shall become a people, and he also shall be great: but truly his younger brother [Ephraim] shall be greater than he, and his seed shall become a multitude of nations. And he blessed them that day, saying, In thee shall Israel bless, saying, God make thee as Ephraim and as Manasseh: and he set Ephraim before Manasseh ... (Gen 48:19-20).

Jacob went on to further elevate the status of the descendants of Joseph's sons to that of "full tribes in their own right" (Gen 41:50). To the mighty prince Joseph himself the patriarch declared:

Joseph is a fruitful bough, even a fruitful bough by a well; whose branches run over the wall: The archers have sorely grieved him, and shot at him, and hated him: But his bow abode in strength, and the arms of his hands were made strong by the hands of the mighty God of Jacob; (from thence is the shepherd, the Stone of Israel:) Even by the God of thy father, who shall help thee; and by the Almighty, who shall bless thee with blessings of heaven above, blessings of the deep that lieth under, blessings of the breasts, and of the womb: The blessings of thy father have prevailed above the blessings of my progenitors unto the utmost bound of the everlasting hills: they shall be on the head of Joseph, and on the crown of the head of him that was separate from his brethren ... (Gen 49:22-26 KJV)

Thus, before he died, the old patriarch blessed his fourth son Judah with the kingly scepter and his eleventh (yet 'anointed') son Joseph — or rather Joseph's second and youngest son, Ephraim, to whom it passed — with the priestly 'firstborn' birthright (Gen 49:10, 22-26). This divided the blessings of God's children into two parts — with 'kingship' going to the House of Judah, and the firstborn 'priesthood' inheritance going to the House of Joseph — leading to an eventual breach between the children of Judah and those of Joseph's sons Ephraim and Manasseh. That critical breach — which widened again later with divisions between Levi and the sons of Aaron — would only be healed in a far-distant, future day, after Israel's 'scattering' (722–586 BC) and centuries-long apostate captivity among Gentile nations.

== Josephite prophecy ==
Give ear, O Shepherd of Israel, thou that leadest Joseph like a flock; thou that dwellest between the cherubims, shine forth. Before Ephraim and Benjamin and Manasseh stir up thy strength, and come and save us ... Thou hast brought a vine out of Egypt: thou hast cast out the heathen, and planted it ... to take deep root, and it filled the land ... The hills were covered with the shadow of it ... She sent out her boughs unto the sea ... Return, we beseech thee, O God of hosts: look down from heaven, and behold, and visit this vine; And the vineyard which thy right hand hath planted, and the branch that thou madest strong for thyself ... Let thy hand be upon the man of thy right hand, upon the son of man whom thou madest strong for thyself ... Turn us again, O Lord God of hosts, cause thy face to shine; and we shall be saved ... (Psalm 80:1-2, 8-11, 14-15, 17, 19)

In the latter days, according to LDS interpretation, the tribes of Israel were to be gathered again into one fold (the elect family of God) in the 'second' promised land of Joseph's 'double portioned' inheritance — which Latter-day Saints believe is the entire American continent of North and South America (with North America serving as the latter-day 'Zion') — which God has consecrated to house, at a future day, His holy city of the 'New Jerusalem'.

The Ephraimite tribe would eventually come to rule over all of Israel's tribes (Gen 37:510; 49:22-26). God's promises to the House of David (Judah) would also stand sure, in time, but they would be subsumed in a united mission with, and led by, Ephraim to convert the world, under the divine commission given to the house of Joseph — the salvation of God's children (2 Sam 7:16; Psalm 89:3-4; and 1 Chron 28:4-5). All of Israel's lost tribes, according to LDS theology, will gather to Ephraim at the end of days, for it is at the hands of Ephraim that they will receive the reward of their promises and blessings: "And there shall they fall down and be crowned with glory, even in Zion [the New Jerusalem of the Americas], by the hands of the [royal birthright (priestly) Ephraimite] servants of the Lord, even the children of Ephraim. And they shall be filled with songs [temple psalms, hymns] of everlasting joy. Behold, this is the blessing of the everlasting God upon the tribes of Israel, and the richer blessing upon the head of Ephraim and his fellows [his brethren]. And they also of the tribe of Judah [the Jews], after their pain [from the captivity, exile, and persecutions of millennia], shall be sanctified in holiness before the Lord [they will participate anew in His covenant ordinances], to dwell in his presence [in a third Jerusalem temple] day and night, forever and ever" (D&C 133:32-35; see also vv. 25-31).

== New Jerusalem ==
The Book of Mormon prophet Ether taught that a remnant of the house of Joseph would build a holy city in the Americas. Afterwards, there would be a New Jerusalem that would come down from heaven where the remnant would live. When Jesus visited the Nephites in the Americas, he taught that they were a remnant of the house of Joseph. After they were brought to the knowledge of the Lord, they would be given the Americas as their inheritance. Repentant Gentiles will assist them in building the New Jerusalem. Early Latter Day Saints interpreted these scriptures to mean that there would be a sudden and dramatic conversion of the American Indians to Mormonism. They viewed themselves as repentant Gentiles that would assist the American Indians in building the New Jerusalem, They warned Americans who did not repent would be destroyed by the American Indians to make way for the New Jerusalem, based on a scripture in the Book of Mormon that warns the Gentiles to repent, "lest a remnant of the seed of Jacob shall go forth among you as a lion, and tear you in pieces, and there is none to deliver."

After some failed missions to the American Indians, the concept of the New Jerusalem started being reinterpreted. Instead of being built by the Native Americans, it was taught that the New Jerusalem was to be built by white Latter Day Saints. Instead of seeing themselves as repentant Gentiles, Latter Day Saints began seeing themselves as also being a remnant of the house of Joseph, through Ephraim. Instead of building New Jerusalem together with the Native Americans, they began seeing it as two different places, with Zion being built upon the hills and the Lamanites in the wilderness. Bruce R. McConkie, an LDS apostle taught: "An occasional whiff of nonsense goes around the Church acclaiming that the Lamanites will build the temple in the New Jerusalem and that Ephraim and others will come to their assistance. This illusion is born of an inordinate love for Father Lehi's children and of a desire to see them all become now as Samuel the Lamanite once was. The Book of Mormon passages upon which it is thought to rest have reference not to the Lamanites but to the whole house of Israel. The temple in Jackson County will be built by Ephraim, meaning the Church as it is now constituted."

== Samaritan brethren ==
Both the Samaritans and the Latter-day Saints claim Joseph as one of their ancient tribal patriarchs. In LDS interfaith relations with Jews, the Church sometimes calls its people 'Joseph', whilst calling the Jews 'Judah', emphasizing beliefs of close kinship and mutual sacred covenant. Even though Latter-day Saints do not believe themselves to be exclusively descended from these specific tribes, in their use of tribal names, they associate themselves most closely with these specific dominant tribes of 'Joseph'. No denomination of Judaism affirms these Samaritan or LDS beliefs, nor similar beliefs perhaps adhered to by other faiths.

== Proposed House of Joseph ==
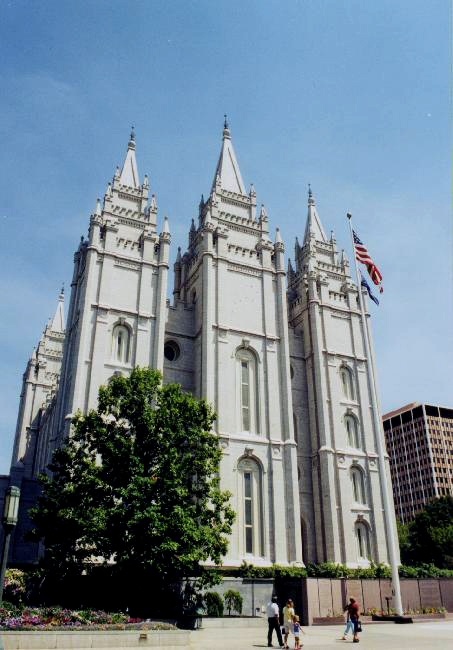
The Salt Lake Temple of The Church of Jesus Christ of Latter Day Saints is the largest attraction in the city's Temple Square.

The Church teaches that the gathering of the descendants of Ephraim and Manasseh in the Americas fulfills the prophecy of Jacob that "Joseph is a fruitful bough, even a fruitful bough by a well; whose branches run over the wall" (Gen 49:22), wherein the enclosed "wall" of the water-filled "well" is understood to be an ocean-barrier of safety that separates lands. The "fruitful bough" suggests prosperity and an abundant grapevine that spills over the wall's boundaries, to take root in Joseph's 'double portion' land of promise as an abundant "plant of righteousness" and "of renown," and as the "plant of a great people" (1 Enoch 93:10; Ezek 34:29; 4 Ezra 9:21). With much of the tribe of Joseph gathered, it is now, by divine mandate, an Ephraimite responsibility to gather, and to receive, the rest of Israel.

=== Members of The Church of Jesus Christ of Latter-day Saints ===
The Church of Jesus Christ of Latter-day Saints (LDS Church), is the largest and best known denomination within the Latter Day Saint movement (a form of Christian Restorationism). The Church is headquartered in Salt Lake City, Utah, and claims through inspired patriarchal blessings to its members throughout the world that many of these are descendants of Josephite Ephraim and Manasseh, with the tribe of Ephraim holding a responsibility of ecclesiastical leadership, but also of spearheading the Church's worldwide missionary program in what it considers to be 'the last days'. The LDS Church believes that scattered descendants of Ephraim from Europe, Scandinavia, and other parts of the world have been led by the guiding hand of God to settle in the Americas, along with the descendants of the Lamanites and others, and that the Americas are a "promised land" of liberty for those who have been led there.

All Church members, however — even if, through their 'patriarchal blessings', they are declared by a church patriarch to be of another Israelite tribe, or from a line of descent other than that of Ephraim, Manasseh, or Israel's other tribes — are yet, through faith and conversion, 'adopted' into the house of Israel and equally 'chosen'. As such, members of the church often refer to themselves collectively as 'modern Israel'. All are an integral part of the restored church and kingdom of God on earth — which, Latter-day Saints profess, is the same organization of the primitive church that existed anciently, as originally established by Christ and His apostles.

As descendants principally, therefore, of Joseph of Egypt, and particularly of Ephraim, they believe that theirs is a special latter-day commission from God to 'gather' into 'one fold' the remnants of the house of Israel from the nations of the earth, according to ancient prophecy (2 Ne 9:2; 3 Ne 21:1-11, 22). But this 'leadership' calling with respect to the 'gathering', as they believe, extends far beyond this fundamental Ephraimite mandate to reclaim the family of Israel, for they are to seek, as commanded by the Lord in modern revelation, the conversion of all who seek salvation in the celestial kingdom of God, who will believe on the Lord Jesus Christ, repent, and accept His 'true' gospel (D&C 1:30) that was, after a long 'night' of apostasy, restored through 'the Prophet of the Restoration,' Joseph Smith, Jr.

Members of The Church of Jesus Christ of Latter-day Saints, who believe themselves predominantly to be of the Ephraimite branch of the House of Joseph, assert that revelations given of God to the Prophet Joseph Smith (JST Gen 50), and as contained in the Book of Mormon (2 Ne 3), bear witness that the Patriarch Jacob's firstborn 'double portion' of both progeny and lands with which he blessed his son, Joseph of Egypt (and his 'double portion'-inheriting grandsons Ephraim and Manasseh), included the additional 'land' portion of the whole of the American continent — to which (c. 588 BC), from the southeastern coast of the Arabian Peninsula, a "fruitful branch" of Joseph's posterity (the 'Lehite Colony', composed of descendants of both Ephraim and Manasseh) traveled by sea. The Book of Mormon professes to be the abridged history of that Josephite branch — Ezekiel's "stick of Joseph" which, in its marvelous latter-day re-pairing, or re-union, with the "stick of Judah," now rests, or can rest, as 'one' in Israelite hands (see Ezek 37:16, 19).

=== Book of Mormon bloodlines ===
The Book of Mormon frequently identifies itself as a record of Joseph's children, with the ancient prophet Lehi (Hebrew לחי Léḥî / Lāḥî "jawbone") being an Israelite of the Josephite tribe of Manasseh (Alma 10:3) and the wives of his sons, as the Prophet Joseph Smith later explained, being of the Josephite tribe of Ephraim.

In the Book of Mormon, the prophet Lehi lived around 600 BC. He and his family were residents of Jerusalem in the Kingdom of Judah under the reign of King Zedekiah. Lehi also held other property, perhaps outside the city of Jerusalem. Some have suggested that he was a merchant. Lehi had six sons: Laman, Lemuel, Sam, Nephi, Jacob, and Joseph; and at least two daughters, who were not named in the Book of Mormon. Lehi's sons are said to be characteristically Ephrathite, though it is uncertain what this means or why this would be. Some LDS church leaders have suggested that Lehi's wife Sariah may have descended from Ephraim, the son of Joseph. McConkie (1980) notes that Joseph Smith is reported to have said that within the Lost 116 pages Lehi's friend, Ishmael (not to be confused with Abraham's son Ishmael), who joined Lehi in escaping Jerusalem, was revealed to be a descendant of Ephraim. Lehi's sons marrying Ishmael's daughters would then explain why their descendants could have belonged to either the Tribe of Ephraim or the Tribe of Manasseh.

Shortly before the destruction of Jerusalem, Lehi and Ishmael and their families escaped, along with another man named Zoram. Lehi led them south down the Arabian Peninsula until they reached a fertile coastal region, which they named Bountiful. There, they built a ship, and sailed across the ocean to the Americas. Lehi's sons Nephi and Laman are said to have established themselves and to have founded Israelite nations: the Nephites and the Lamanites.

==== Lamanites ====
In The Book of Mormon, a Lamanite is a member of one of three main ethnic groups described in the book. The other two peoples are the Jaredites and the Nephites. The Lamanites, together with the Nephites, are described as descending from the family of Lehi, a wealthy Jewish merchant, who traveled from the Middle East c. 588 BC to the Americas by boat. The Nephites descended from a younger son, Nephi, while the Lamanites descended from the elder brothers, Laman and Lemuel. Lehi carried with them family genealogical records as well as scriptural records recorded on "brass plates", which declared that his lineal descent was from the tribe of Manasseh. He later prophesied (2 Ne 3) that a latter-day Joseph, son of Joseph, descended from the house of Joseph, would do a great work that would be a blessing to Lehi's descendants. Latter-day Saints believe that this prophecy was fulfilled in Joseph Smith through the translation of the Book of Mormon, establishing the restored Church of Jesus Christ, and initiating the 'Gathering of Israel' among latter-day descendants of the tribes of Israel, particularly those from Ephraim and Manasseh.

The Book of Mormon describes many interactions between the Lamanites and the Nephites. War, trade, proselytizing all continued with varying degrees through different stages in their histories. The ethnic makeup of both peoples shifted as their story progressed. The Lamanites initially were given a darker skin color from God due to their rebellion. At one point in the book the Lamanites and Nephites unite for two centuries of peace (c. AD 30 to 230). But shortly after this period, factions reemerged, and their unity began to disintegrate with a reestablishment of economic class distinctions. The divisions were due to ideological differences rather than ethnic divides. Some time after AD 400, the Nephite culture and most if not all of its people were destroyed in a series of great wars between the Lamanites, Nephites, and the Gadianton Robbers — a renegade organization of murderous conspirators who, like the ancient Watchers, giants, and Cainites, employed a network of "secret combinations" and oath-bound pacts for personal and collective gain.

==== Theories about modern Lamanite descendants ====
Many Mormons consider Native Americans to be descendants of the Lamanites. Officially, The Church of Jesus Christ of Latter-day Saints appears to at least partially accept this position. The introduction to the Latter Day Saint (LDS) edition of The Book of Mormon states, "[T]he Lamanites ... are among the ancestors of the American Indians." However, this position of the Lamanites being among the ancestors of the American Indians is controversial. Based on genetic and archeological data, mainstream scientists have concluded that Native Americans are descended from the prehistoric inhabitants of East Asia, although mixed genetics are not precluded by either science or LDS doctrine. Thus, some Mormon scholars view Lamanites as either one small tribe among many in the ancient Americas, the remainder of whom were not discussed in the Book of Mormon although they were implied; a tribe that intermarried with indigenous Native American cultures; or those Native Americans who share the Haplogroup X Gene.

An alternate belief would be that they are fictional characters intended to portray an allegory (a similar debate concerns the Old Testament Book of Job). The Book of Mormon prophesied of great pillage and destruction by those who would find the Lamanite descendants and dominate them before a final period of "carrying them upon their shoulders," implied as bringing them the "fulness of the gospel" and a pattern of free government. Links to various commentaries are listed on the official church website, although they do not represent official church positions.

== See also ==
- Gathering (LDS Church)
- Mormonism and Judaism
- Book of Joseph (Latter Day Saints)
