= Curse and mark of Cain =

Phrase originating in the Hebrew Bible

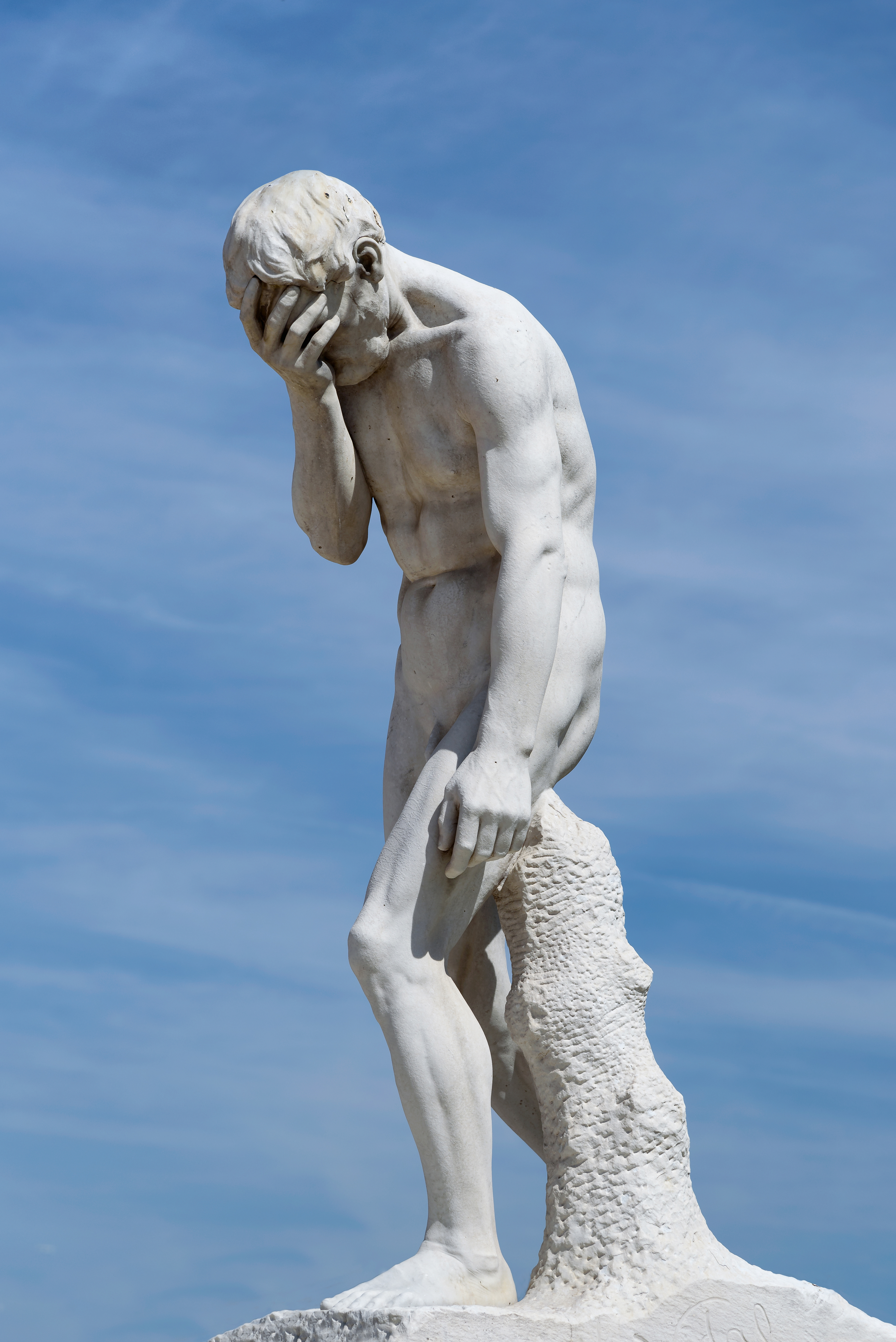
Cain, 1896, by Henri Vidal, Jardin des Tuileries, Paris

The curse of Cain and the mark of Cain are phrases that originated in the story of Cain and Abel in the Book of Genesis. In the stories, if someone harmed Cain, the damage would come back sevenfold. Some interpretations view this as a physical mark, whereas other interpretations see the "mark" as a sign, and not as a physical mark on Cain himself. The King James Version of the Bible reads "set a mark upon Cain".

== Origins ==
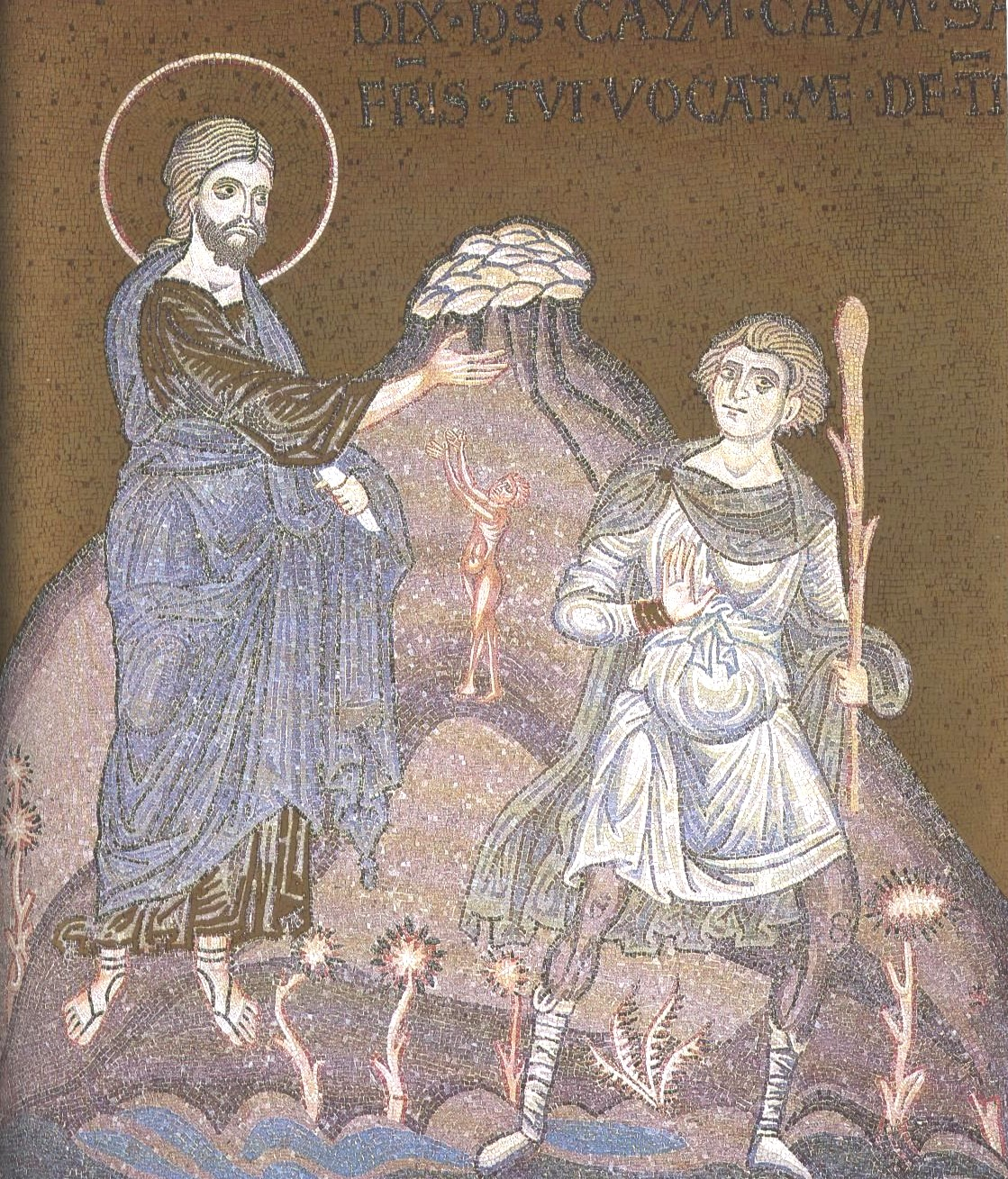
God curses Cain, Monreale cathedral mosaic, 12th century

There is no clear consensus as to what Cain's mark was. The word translated as "mark" in Genesis 4:15 is א֔וֹת ('ōṯ), which could mean a sign, omen, warning, remembrance, motion, gesture, agreement, miracle, wonder, or, most commonly, a letter. In the Torah, the same word is used to describe the stars as signs or omens (Genesis 1:14), the rainbow as the sign of God's promise never again to destroy his creation with a flood (Genesis 9:12), circumcision as a token of God's covenant with Abraham (Genesis 17:11), and the miracles performed by Moses before the Pharaoh (Exodus 4:8, 9, 17, 28; 7:3; 8:23; 10:1, 2).

== Curse of Cain ==
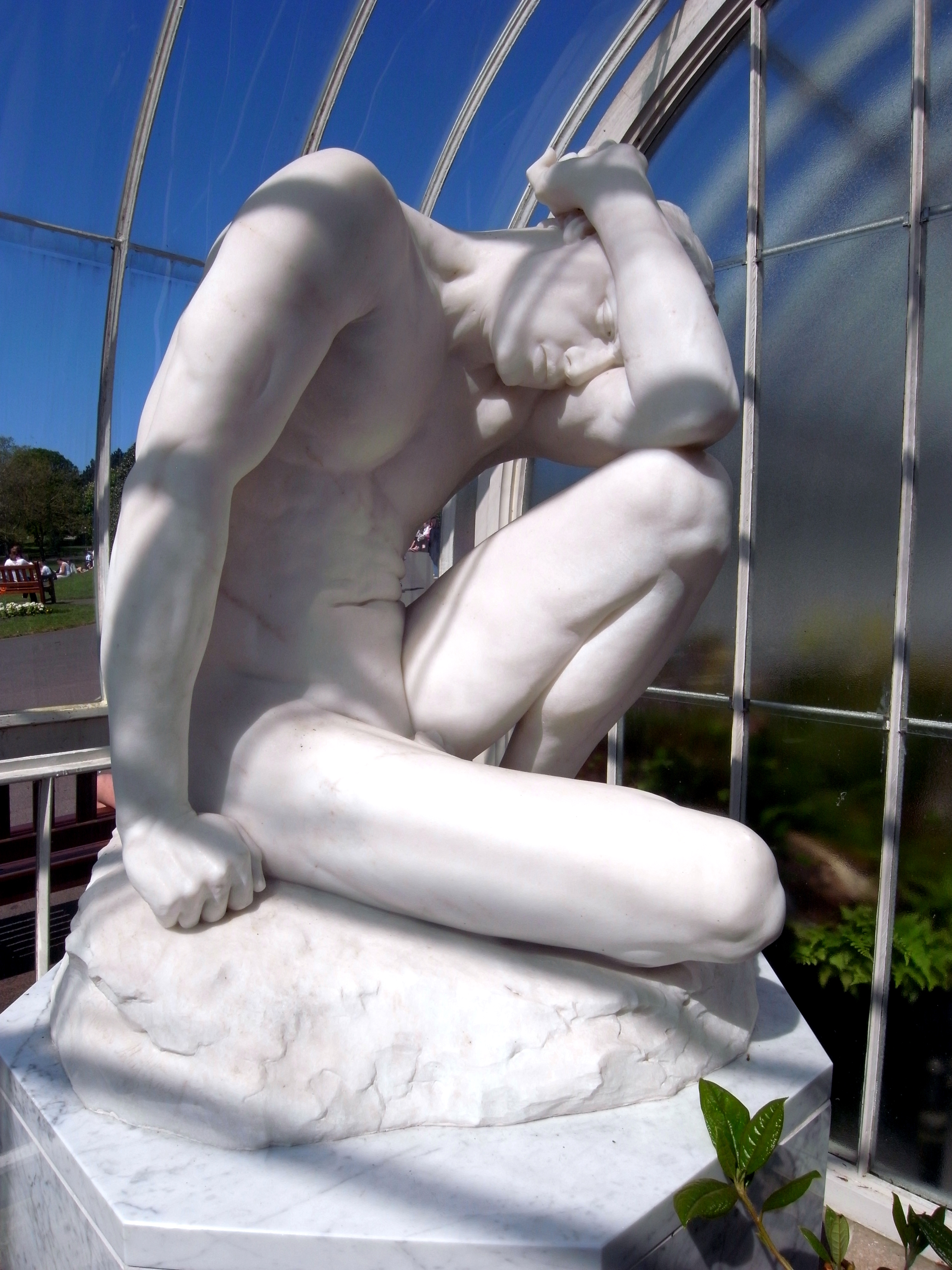
Glasgow Botanic Gardens. Kibble Palace. Edwin Roscoe Mullins – Cain or My Punishment is Greater than I can Bear (Genesis 4:13), about 1899.

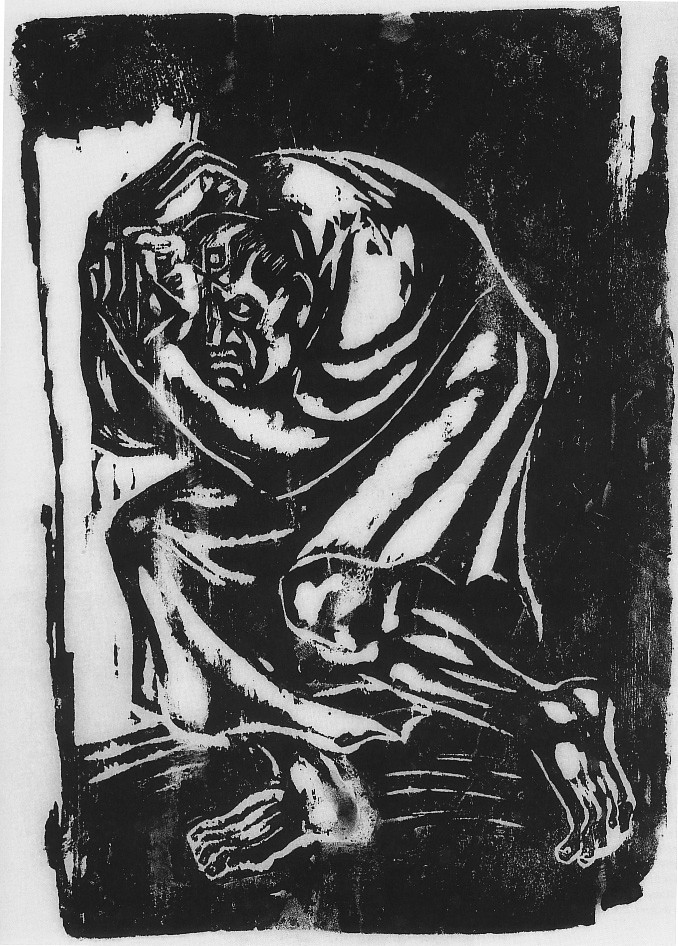
Print by Wilhelm Groß of Cain with mark of a Chi Rho (1956/57).

The narrative of the curse of Cain is found in the text of Genesis 4:11–16. The curse was the result of Cain murdering his brother, Abel, and lying about the murder to God. When Cain spilled his brother's blood, the earth became cursed as soon as the blood hit the ground. In a sense, the earth was left "drinking Abel's blood". Genesis 4:12 gives a two-part sentencing for Cain's curse. The first concerns the earth that was cursed by Abel's blood. Should Cain attempt to farm the land, the earth would not yield produce for him. This may imply why he went on to build cities, namely the City of Enoch. The second part of the curse marks Cain as a fugitive (Hebrew: נע, romanized: nā‘) and a wanderer (Hebrew: נד, romanized: nāḏ). The combination making up this Hebrew phrase נע ונד, "fugitive and wanderer," is unique in the Hebrew Bible. Modern interpretations of the Hebrew verse 12 suggest that Cain went on to live a nomadic lifestyle and that he was also excluded from the family unit. In the Septuagint, the emphasis on Cain's curse is dramatically increased by the combination of the Greek participles στένων καὶ τρέμων (stenōn kai tremōn, "groaning and shaking upon the earth"). Syriac Christianity interprets the Greek version to mean that Cain experienced a real physical affliction that would enable others to know who he was when they saw him. Philo interprets the Greek verse 12 as an allegory for Cain's fear of being soul-less. The Samaritan Pentateuch and the Targums translate the same verse to mean that Cain feared being "an exile and an unstable man".

== Mark of Cain ==
The mark of Cain is God's promise to offer Cain divine protection from premature death with the stated purpose of preventing anyone from killing him. It is not known what the mark was, but it is assumed that the mark was visible. Some have speculated that the mark was a Hebrew or Sumerian character placed on either the face or the arm. The Septuagint translates the mark as a "sign". Thus, it is speculated that the mark served as a sign to others not to commit the same offense.

=== Judaism ===
Abba Arika ("Rav") said that God gave Cain a dog, making him an example for murderers. Abba Jose ben Hanan said that God made a horn grow out of Cain. R. Hanin said that God made Cain an example to penitents (Gen. Rab. 22:12).

Rashi (1:4) comments on Genesis 4:15 by saying that the mark was one of the Hebrew letters of the Tetragrammaton: "He engraved a letter of His [God's] Name onto his [Cain's] forehead." The same statement about the Tetragrammaton was expressed by Targum Jonathan, Pirqé Rabbi Eliezer 21, and Zohar I.36b.

In Kabbalah, the Zohar states that the mark of Cain was one of the twenty-two Hebrew letters of the Torah, although the Zohar's native Aramaic does not actually tell us which of the letters it was. Some commentators, such as Rabbi Michael Berg in his English commentary on the Zohar, suggest that the mark of Cain was the letter vav (ו).

=== Christianity ===
According to author Ruth Mellinkoff, commentators' interpretations of the nature of the "mark" depended on their views regarding the status of Cain, as either being given additional time to repent or as being further shamed.

=== American racial beliefs on the mark of Cain ===
At some point after the start of the slave trade in the United States, a number of racist preachers began teaching the belief that the mark of Cain was a dark skin tone in an attempt to justify their actions, although early descriptions of Romani as "descendants of Cain" written by Franciscan friar Symon Semeonis suggest that this belief had existed for some time. Racist preachers wrote exegetical analyses of the curse, with the assumption that it was dark skin.

This racist interpretation does not take into account that during the flood, only Noah and his family survived; "those destroyed by the Flood are Irad, Mehujael and Methushael, the descendants of Cain in Genesis 4:18." Senior professor Daniel Heimbach of Southeastern Baptist Theological Seminary discussed the logical fallacy of the racist interpretation, writing "since Cain's descendants all died in the flood, the mark of Cain could not refer to anyone today even if it was passed on to his descendants." Heimbach additionally notes that "The Hebrew word translated "mark" (אוֹת, ʾōt) never refers to skin color" and "God did not say Cain's mark would pass on to future generations".

==== Baptist segregationists ====
The split between the Northern and Southern Baptist organizations arose over doctrinal issues pertaining to slavery and the education of slaves. Northern Baptist Convention (now known as the American Baptist Churches USA) supported abolitionism and racial equality. At the time of the split, the Southern Baptist group used the curse of Cain as a justification for slavery. Some 19th- and 20th-century Southern Baptist ministers in the Southern United States taught the belief that there were two separate heavens; one heaven was for Black people, and another heaven was for White people. Southern Baptists either taught or practiced various forms of racial segregation well into the mid-20th century, though members of all races were accepted at worship services. (Note: "Slaves were accepted as members in the same manner as whites were. After a slave expressed his or her desire to join a church, he or she was required to describe his or her religious experience. If the congregation was favorably impressed by one's testimony, the applicant was accepted into the fellowship and he or she was baptized. When black church members moved from one community to another, they were given letters of dismissal which they might place with another Baptist church. Black Baptist church members worshiped in the sanctuary with whites, participated in the service of Holy Communion, and contributed to help support the various programs of the denomination. Still blacks and females in antebellum Baptist churches held a membership status subordinate to that of adult white males, since that group alone determined denominational policies and procedures.) In 1995, the Southern Baptist Convention officially denounced racism and it also apologized for its past defense of slavery. At present, the Southern Baptist Convention is racially diverse, with one in four congregations having a nonwhite majority.

The majority of Christian churches in the world, including the Catholic Church, Eastern Orthodox churches, Evangelical-Lutheran churches, Anglican churches, and Oriental Orthodox churches, did not recognize the racist interpretations and did not participate in the religious movement to exclude Black people from ministry.

==== Curse of Ham ====
The Curse of Cain was often conflated with the Curse of Ham by racists. According to the Bible, Ham discovered his father Noah drunk and naked in his tent, but instead of honoring his father by covering his nakedness, he ran and told his brothers about it. Because of this, Noah cursed Ham's son, Canaan, by saying that he was to be "a servant of servants" (Genesis 9:20–27). One interpretation of this passage states that Ham married a descendant of Cain. While there is no indication in the Bible of Ham's wife descending from Cain, this racist interpretation was used to justify slavery and it was particularly popular in North America during the Atlantic slave trade due to interpretations identifying Ham as the progenitor of the people of Africa.

Senior professor Daniel Heimbach of Southeastern Baptist Theological Seminary presents a scholarly analysis that refutes the racist interpretation:

The curse of Canaan rationale misinterprets Genesis 9:18–27. Canaan was the youngest son of Noah’s second son Ham, and the curse in this story (sometimes erroneously referred to as the curse of Ham) applied to Canaan and not to Ham. After the flood, Noah got inebriated and passed out in his tent, and someone discovering him made a joke of it. It is not clear who that was, but the text implicates Canaan since Noah treats him as responsible. Another clue is that the culprit is identified as being Noah’s “youngest son” (Gen 9:24). Ham was not Noah’s youngest son (Gen 5:32; 7:13; 10:1). But Canaan was Ham’s youngest son (Gen 10:6), could have been Noah’s youngest grandson when the incident occurred, and Hebrew often uses son (בֵּן, bēn) for offspring without generational precision. Shem and Japheth respect their father’s dignity by covering him, and, afterward, Noah blessed Shem and Japheth and cursed Canaan saying, “He will be the lowest of slaves to his brothers” (Gen 9:25). This text was used to defend enslaving and considering blacks inferior prior to the Civil War, but this interpretation, too, is completely wrong. If anything, black people are descended from Ham’s older sons Cush, Mizraim, and Put and not from his youngest son Canaan (Gen 10:15–19). Canaan’s descendants settled Sidon (Phoenicia), Sodom and Gomorrah, and the Promised Land (land of Canaan). Sodom and Gomorrah were destroyed by God (Gen 19:24–25), Canaanites in the Promised Land were destroyed by Joshua (Deut 7:1–2), and the Bible says nothing connecting Canaan’s line with Africa. The curse of Canaan simply has nothing to do with Africa or blackness.

==== Latter Day Saint movement ====
Mormonism began during the height of the acceptance of the curse of Cain doctrine in North America, as well as the even more popular curse of Ham doctrine. Like many North Americans, Mormons of the 19th century commonly assumed that Black Africans had Cain's "mark" of black skin, and Ham's curse to be servants of servants. Brigham Young taught that Black people were cursed descendants of Cain, and used this to justify slavery. In the Pearl of Great Price, considered scripture by most adherents of the Latter Day Saint movement, Enoch talks about shunning the descendants of Cain and that they had black skin: "And Enoch also beheld the residue of the people which were the sons of Adam; and they were a mixture of all the seed of Adam save it was the seed of Cain, for the seed of Cain were black, and had not place among them." (Moses 7:22) Church president Brigham Young stated, "What is the mark? You will see it on the countenance of every African you ever did see...."

As related by Abraham O. Smoot after his death, apostle David W. Patten said he encountered a man with "very dark" skin in Paris, Tennessee, who said that he was Cain. The account states that Cain had earnestly sought death but was denied it, and that his mission was to destroy the souls of men. The recollection of Patten's story is quoted in apostle Spencer W. Kimball's The Miracle of Forgiveness.

Although not explicitly stated in Latter-day Saint scripture, at least one publication of the largest denomination in Mormonism, the Church of Jesus Christ of Latter-day Saints (LDS Church), still teaches that Ham's wife was a descendant of Cain. Its "Guide to the Scriptures," published as an explanatory companion to the scriptures, states "Ham's wife, Egyptus, was a descendant of Cain; the sons of their daughter Egyptus settled in Egypt".

===== Temple and priesthood ban =====
There is evidence which proves that Joseph Smith did not consider the ban on Black men to the priesthood to be relevant in modern times, since he himself (and other church leaders close to him) ordained Black men into it, notably Elijah Abel and Walker Lewis.

After the death of Joseph Smith, Brigham Young (the second President of the Church) accepted the idea that people of African ancestry were generally under the curse of Cain, and in 1852, he stated that people of Black African descent were not eligible to hold the church's priesthood. Young taught that in the War in Heaven, both Cain and Abel were leaders. The spirits of Black people fought under Cain and were assigned to be Cain's descendants. Those that fought under Abel were assigned to be Abel's descendants. Cain hoped that by killing his brother, the spirits that were under him would have an advantage over the spirits under Abel. However, God cursed Cain and his descendants not to have the priesthood until all of Abel's descendants had the priesthood. The spirits of Black people understood this and stood with Cain and accepted the punishment.

The ban on the priesthood affected Black members differently than it did in other churches because the LDS Church has a lay priesthood in which virtually all worthy male members become priesthood holders.

Several of Young's successors defended the priesthood ban as being a result of the curse of Cain, though some disagreed. Sterling M. McMurrin reported that, in 1954, church president David O. McKay said: "There is not now, and there never has been a doctrine in this church that the negroes are under a divine curse. There is no doctrine in the church of any kind pertaining to the negro. We believe that we have a scriptural precedent for withholding the priesthood from the negro. It is a practice, not a doctrine, and the practice someday will be changed. And that's all there is to it."

In 1978, LDS Church president Spencer W. Kimball reported receiving a revelation from God allowing all worthy male members of the church to receive the priesthood without regard to race or color. Although the church had previously been criticized for its policy during the civil rights movement, the change seems to have been prompted by problems facing mixed-race converts in Brazil.

Many Black church members think that giving an apology would be a "detriment" to church work and a catalyst for further racial misunderstanding. African-American church member Bryan E. Powell says: "There is no pleasure in old news, and this news is old." Gladys Newkirk agrees, stating: "I've never experienced any problems in this church. I don't need an apology [...] We're the result of an apology." Many Black Mormons say that they are willing to look beyond the former teachings and cleave to the doctrines of the church, in part because of its powerful, detailed teachings on life after death.

The LDS Church has issued an official statement about past practices and theories regarding skin color, stating: "[t]oday, the Church disavows the theories advanced in the past that black skin is a sign of divine disfavor or curse, [...] Church leaders today unequivocally condemn all racism, past and present, in any form."

===== Civil rights =====
When Utah was considering the legalization of slavery, Brigham Young told the Utah Territorial Legislature that the curse of Cain required slavery. He argued that until all of the descendants of Abel have access to the priesthood, all of the descendants of Cain should remain in servitude. He argued that because they did not have the right to govern the affairs of the Church due to the priesthood ban, they also should not have the right to govern the affairs of the state, including the right to vote. He warned that if they made the children of Cain equal to them, they would be cursed. He also argued that if someone married a descendant of Cain, that they would also have the same curse. The church has since repudiated all of these teachings.

== See also ==
- Ashwatthama
- Badge of shame
- Cain tradition
- Castration
- Christian views on slavery
- Curse of Ham
- Historical race concepts
- History of Christian thought on persecution and tolerance
- Islamic views on slavery
- Jewish views on slavery
- Mark of the beast
- Mormonism and slavery
- Mormon teachings on skin color
- Pre-Adamite
- Racism in Jewish communities
- Racism in Muslim communities
- Reptilian conspiracy theory
- Romani crucifixion nails legend
- Serpent seed
- Wandering Jew
