= Henri Vidal (sculptor) =

French sculptor

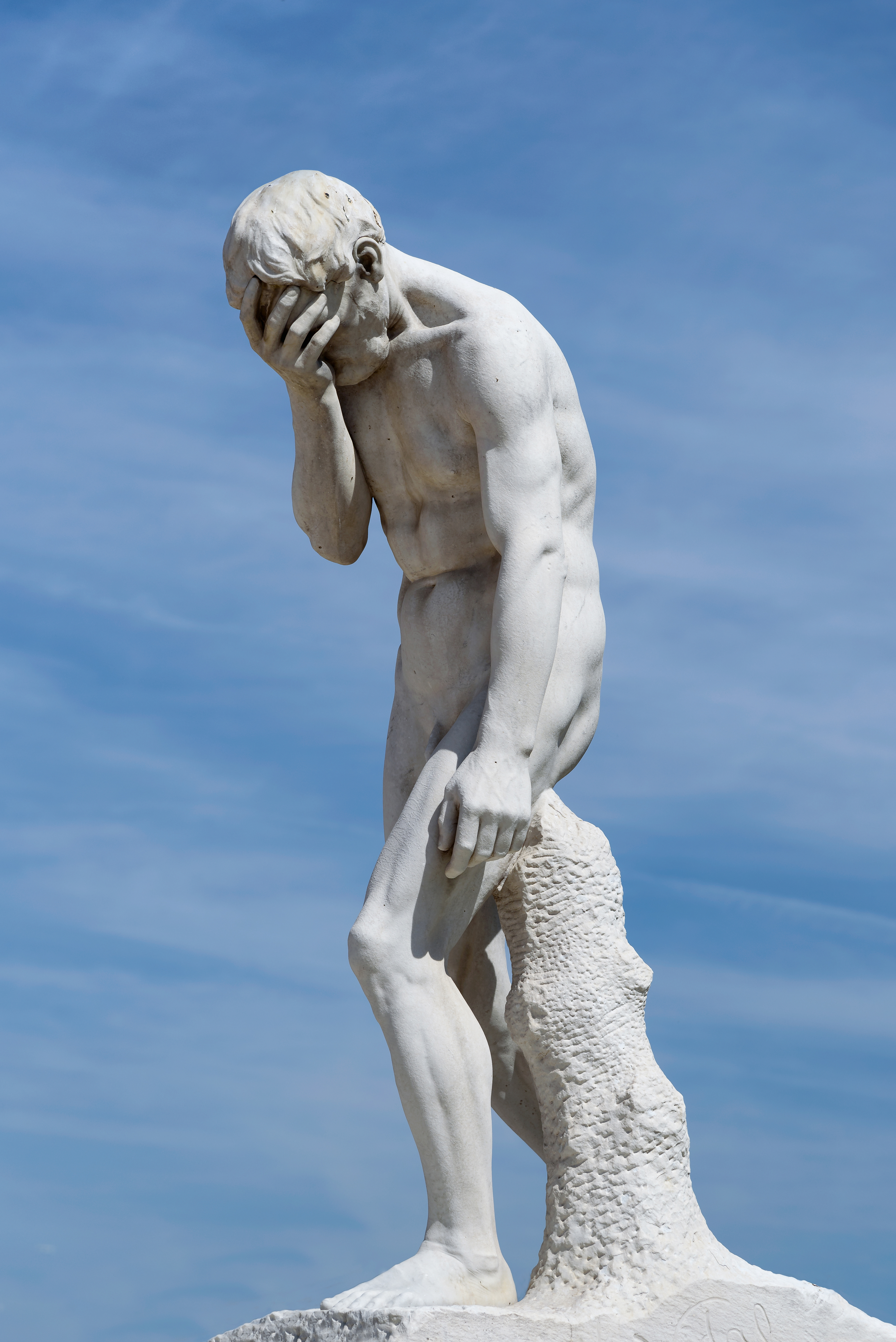
Caïn venant de tuer son frère Abel, 1896

Henri Vidal (born 4 May 1864 in Charenton, died in 1918 in Le Cannet) was a French sculptor known for his 1896 sculpture, Caïn venant de tuer son frère Abel (Cain, after having murdered his brother Abel) which is in the Tuileries Garden in Paris. Vidal was a student of Mathurin Moreau.

== Honours and awards ==
At the Salon des artistes français he was awarded

- In 1884, an honorable mention;
- In 1890, a medal in the 3rd class;
- In 1892, the Salon prize awarded by the Superior Council of Fine Arts;
- In 1892, a medal in the 2nd class and
- In 1900, a medal in the 1st class.

At the 1900 Paris Exposition he won a silver medal.
