= Romani crucifixion nails legend =

Christian legend against the Roma

The Romani crucifixion nails legend is a story of how a Romani blacksmith made the nails for the cross upon which Jesus Christ was crucified.

== Versions ==
The condemnatory version states that as he made the nails to crucify Jesus Christ, the blacksmith and his kin were condemned to wander the earth and never settle.

The laudatory version states that a Romani stole the fourth nail of the crucifixion to repair his cart, the fourth nail being the one which would have pierced Jesus's heart, and that ever since God has granted the Romani people the moral right to commit petty thefts for things they need on their travels. Writing for website Travellers Times, Damian Le Bas comments: "In reality, both stories are equally absurd, since Jesus was crucified long before the ancestors of today's Romanies ever left India. But the facts have done little to sap the legends' power."

== See also ==
- Jewish deicide
- Wandering Jew
- Romani society and culture
