= Beliefs and practices of the Church of Jesus Christ of Latter-day Saints =

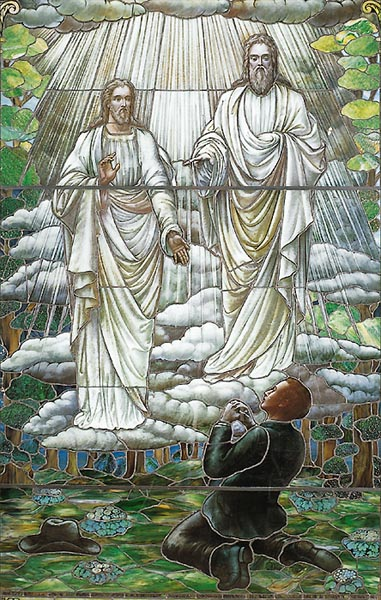
Joseph Smith, Jr. said that he saw two "personages" in the spring of 1820, one of which pointed to the other and said, "This is my beloved son. Hear him!" The church teaches this was an actual visitation by God the Father and Jesus in the flesh.

The Church of Jesus Christ of Latter-day Saints (LDS Church) focuses its doctrine and teaching on Jesus Christ; that he was the Son of God, born of Mary, lived a perfect life, performed miracles, bled from every pore in the Garden of Gethsemane, died on the cross, rose on the third day, appeared again to his disciples, and now resides, authoritatively, on the right hand side of God. In brief, some beliefs are in common with Catholics, Orthodox and Protestant traditions. However, LDS Church teachings differ significantly in other ways and encompass a broad set of doctrines, so that the above-mentioned denominations usually place the church outside the bounds of orthodox Christian teaching as summarized in the Nicene Creed.

The church's core beliefs, circa 1842, are summarized in the "Articles of Faith", and its four primary principles are faith in Jesus Christ, repentance, baptism by immersion for the remission of sin, and the laying on of hands for the Gift of the Holy Ghost.

== Ritual and doctrine ==
=== Apostasy and restoration ===
In common with other Restorationist churches, the LDS Church teaches that a Great Apostasy occurred. It teaches that after the death of Jesus and the Twelve Apostles, the priesthood authority was lost and some important doctrinal teachings, including the text of the Bible, were changed from their original form, thus necessitating a restoration prior to the Second Coming. That restoration, according to church doctrine, began during the life of Joseph Smith.

According to church theology, the restoration began through a series of visions and revelations, including Smith's First Vision in 1820, visits by various angelic messengers including Moroni from whom he received "the everlasting gospel", John the Baptist, Moses, Elijah, and the apostles Peter, James and John. Both Smith and Oliver Cowdery testified that these last messengers came to them while they were together and conferred upon them the priesthood authority with its various "keys", so that mankind again possessed the "fullness of the Gospel" with authority to administer in the ordinances thereof. The restoration also included the re-establishment of the Church of Christ on April 6, 1830. The LDS Church teaches that it is the successor of this Church of Christ and that the current President of the Church is Smith's modern successor.

=== Sacred texts ===
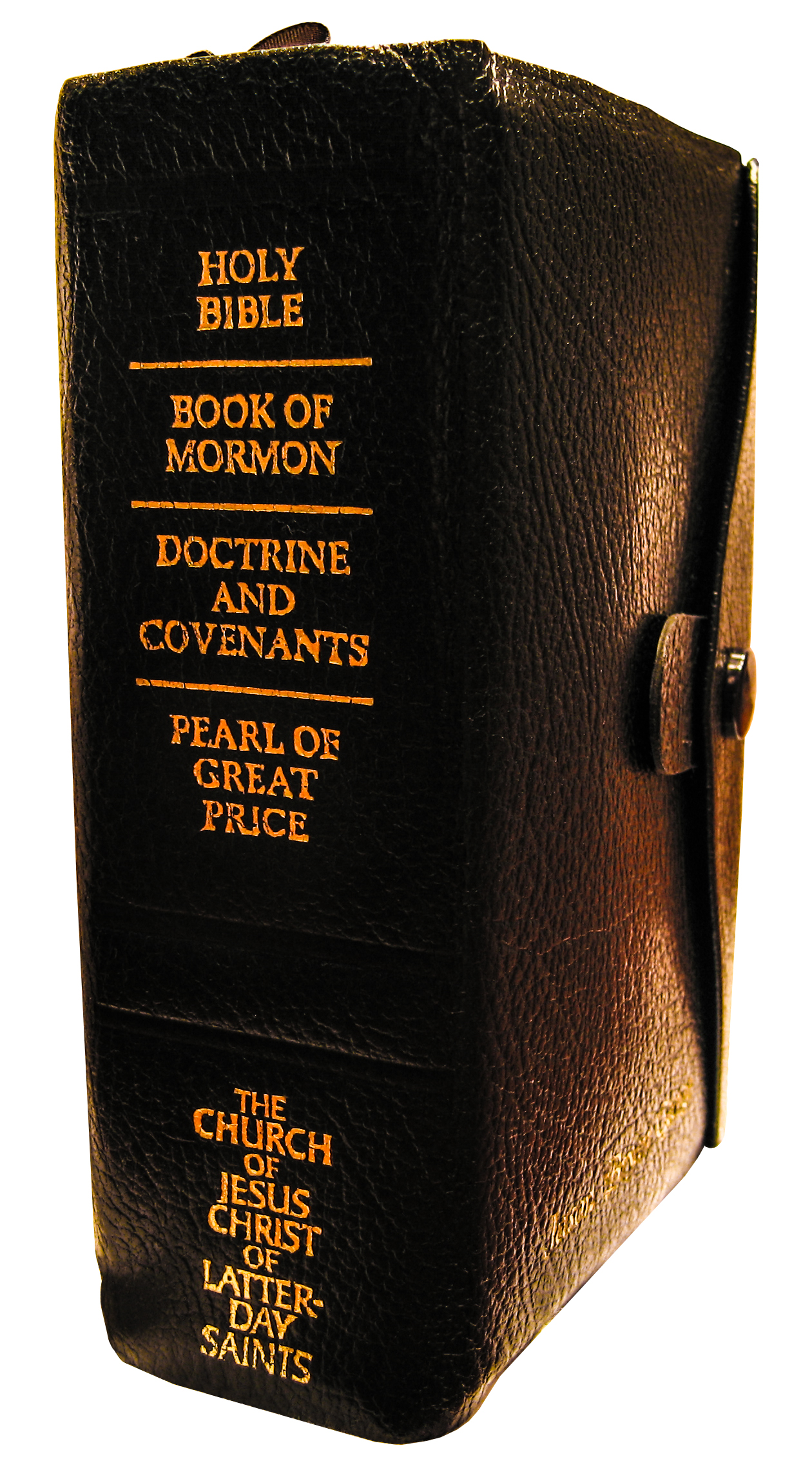
The standard works of the LDS Church printed in the Quadruple Combination format

The church's canon of sacred texts consists of the Holy Bible, the Book of Mormon, the Doctrine and Covenants, and the Pearl of Great Price. These are more commonly referred to as the church's standard works. Though not canonical, many members of the church also accept the teachings and pronouncements of the church's general authorities—and in particular those of the President of the Church—as doctrine, and complementing the standard works.

The church accepts the Holy Bible as the word of God "as far as it is translated correctly". The LDS Church uses the Authorized King James Version (KJV) for its English-speaking members and other translations to accommodate alternative languages. Smith did work on his own translation, but it is only used in conjunction with the KJV. Extracts of his translation can be found in the Pearl of Great Price, called the Book of Moses and Joseph Smith–Matthew. For English-language speakers, the church encourages the use of the King James Version, and the church publishes an edition of the KJV. The church regards parts of the Apocrypha, the writings of some Protestant Reformers and non-Christian religious leaders, and the non-religious writings of some philosophers to be inspired, though not canonical.

The church's most distinctive scripture, the Book of Mormon, was published by founder Joseph Smith in 1830. It is believed to be "another testament of Jesus Christ" and bears that subtitle as of 1982. Smith stated that, under divine direction, he translated the Book of Mormon from metal plates having "the appearance of gold" found buried near his home. Eight men signed a statement as witnesses that Smith possessed the plates and that they had seen them. As of September 2007, the full text of the Book of Mormon had been translated and published in 77 languages, and selections in an additional 28 for a total of 105 languages. The introduction printed with the book says that it is a history of people who were among the ancestors of the "American Indian" peoples.

The church's Doctrine and Covenants is a collection of modern revelations, declarations, and teachings, primarily written by Smith. The Pearl of Great Price consists of five separate books, including two portions of Smith's translation of the Bible. These five books are Selections from the Book of Moses (corresponding to a portion of the Old Testament), the Book of Abraham (Smith's translation of an Egyptian papyrus, which includes an account of the creation), Joseph Smith–Matthew (corresponding to a section of the New Testament), Joseph Smith–History (an excerpt from Smith's 1838 autobiographical writings), and the Articles of Faith (an excerpt of one of Smith's 1842 letters describing church beliefs).

=== God the Father, Jesus Christ, and the Holy Ghost ===
In LDS Church teachings, God the Father, Jesus Christ, and the Holy Spirit are referred to as the "Godhead". According to LDS scripture, the Godhead has the following attributes:

- They are three separate and distinct beings.
- They are collectively "one God", meaning that they are united in spirit, mind, and purpose. According to LDS theology, Jesus is "one" with the Father in the same way as he asked his disciples to be "one" with him and each other.
- Jesus and the Father have physical "bodies of flesh and bone", while the Holy Spirit does not, though the Holy Spirit has a "spirit body".
- God the Father is understood to be the literal father of the spirits of humanity, as well as the literal father of both the spirit and physical body of Jesus.

The church's view of the Godhead breaks with Nicene Creed tradition and believes it returns to the teachings taught by Jesus. It does not accept the creed's definition of Trinity that the three are "consubstantial" nor the Athanasian Creed's statement that they are "incomprehensible", arguing that the LDS view is self-evident in the Bible that the Father, the Son, and the Holy Ghost are separate persons—three divine beings as illustrated in Jesus' farewell prayer, his baptism at the hands of John, his transfiguration, and the martyrdom of Stephen.

In addition to the Godhead, LDS theology recognizes at least the possibility of other divine entities; however, these other "gods" and "goddesses" are not considered to be objects of worship, and have no direct relevance to salvation. Official church materials refer to Heavenly Parents, and a Heavenly Mother. Belief in such a figure is common among members, and she has been mentioned in meetings by church officials and alluded to in two of the hymns of the church. However, very little on the subject of a Heavenly Mother has been taught by the church.

==== God the Father ====
God the Father is understood to be the literal Father of the spirits of all mankind. He is also understood to be the father of Jesus' spirit body and his physical body. On the morning that Jesus was resurrected, Jesus said to Mary Magdalene, "Touch me not; for I am not yet ascended to my Father: but go to my brethren and say unto them, I ascend unto my Father, and your Father; and to my God, and your God."

LDS Church president Lorenzo Snow expressed the nature of the Father in his couplet, "As man now is, God once was: As God now is, man may be", which differs significantly from the traditional Christian idea of theosis. Exaltation is a belief among members of the LDS Church that mankind, as spirit children of their Father in heaven, can become like him.

==== Jesus Christ ====
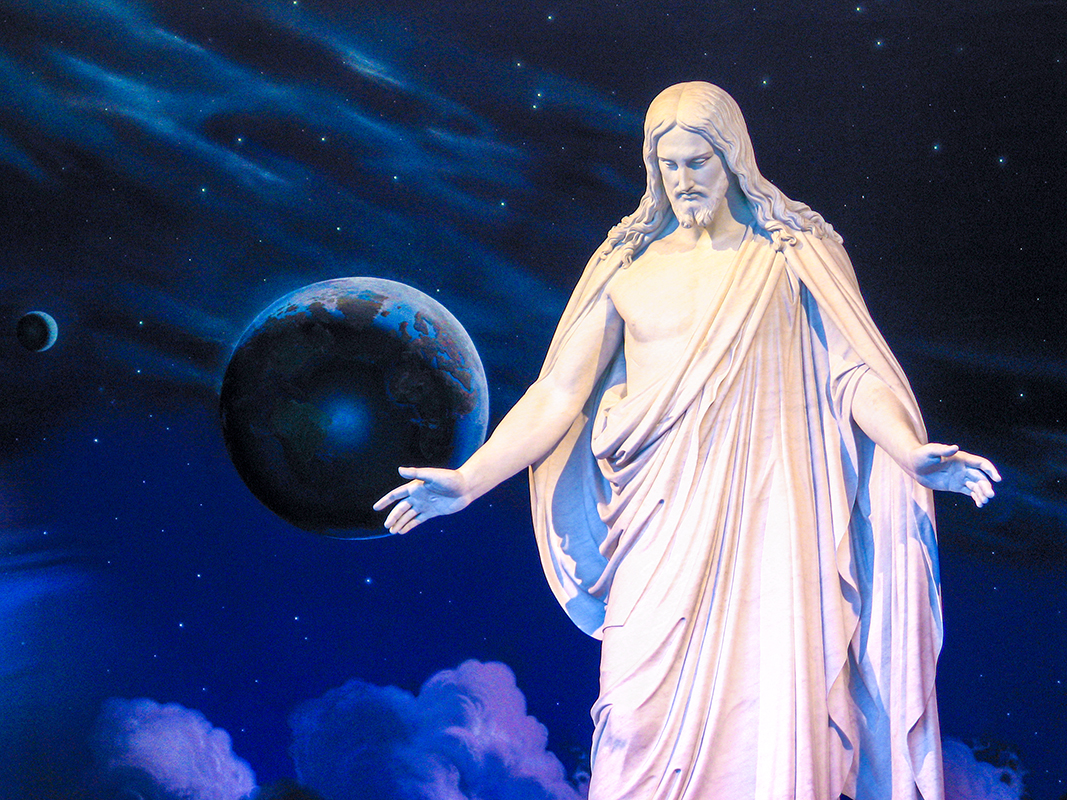
Latter-day Saints believe in the resurrected Jesus Christ, as depicted in the Christus statue in the North Visitors' Center on Temple Square in Salt Lake City.

The church follows what it understands to be the teachings of Jesus, both in the Bible and in other scriptures, such as the Book of Mormon. According to that book, Jesus Christ is "the Son of God, the Father of heaven and earth, the Creator of all things from the beginning; and his mother shall be called Mary." As the Creator, he is at times referred to as the father of heaven and earth. This is one sense in which he shares the title "Father" with God the Father. The church also teaches that Jesus is the LORD Jehovah of the Old Testament, and the Holy One of Israel. Early leaders taught that Jesus had multiple wives and children during his mortal ministry in promotion of Mormon polygamy, but this is no longer a widely held belief or teaching in the church.

The church teaches that those who accept Christ and are baptized are symbolically born again and become the children of Christ. It additionally states that through the Atonement of Jesus Christ all mankind may be saved by obedience to the laws and ordinances of the gospel. Christ's divinity enabled him to take upon himself the penalty for sin and to endure the consequential suffering in Gethsemane and on the cross that paid for the sins of humanity since the Fall of Adam and Eve. This Atonement is also believed to cover not only sin, but all pain, suffering, heartache, or hardship experienced in this life. Latter-day Saints believe that Jesus' status as the son of a mortal woman gave him the ability to suffer temptation and experience physical death; while his status as the Son of God gave him the power to lay down and take up his life again at will. The church also believes in the physical resurrection of Jesus' body. Because of its emphasis on Jesus' resurrection and his status as the living head of the church, the church does not use the symbol of the Christian cross except on the uniforms of military chaplains. Instead, the church tends to focus on the belief that Jesus overcame suffering and death and that he lives today.

==== Holy Ghost ====
The Holy Ghost is regarded as "a being endowed with the attributes and powers of Deity and not a mere force or essence." He testifies of the Father and the Son. "By the power of the Holy Ghost ye may know the truth of all things." The Holy Ghost can sanctify people enabling them "to put off the natural man and [become] a saint through the atonement of Christ the Lord". The Holy Ghost is the comforter that Jesus promised to send: "If ye love me, keep my commandments. And I will pray the Father, and he shall give you another Comforter, that he may abide with you forever."

=== Plan of salvation ===
The plan of salvation or gospel of Christ is a series of steps, a continuum, or means to come to God through the mediation of Jesus. It comprises those teachings of Christ which enable a mortal man or woman to overcome the fall of Adam and Eve in his or her life, and ultimately return to the presence of God, to enjoy the kind of life lived by God the Father, or, more succinctly, "exaltation", also known as "eternal life". The specific teachings include the fact that Adam and Eve fell, becoming subject to the temptations of the devil, bringing upon themselves and their posterity both physical death and spiritual death, separating themselves from God. As a remedy for Adam and Eve's predicament, consistent with God's nature and objective to produce divine heirs, God gave Adam and his posterity the moral agency and choice to either (1) follow and serve Christ, or (2) follow and serve Satan (Mosiah 16). To overcome the lasting effects of the fall, Christ offered himself an infinite sacrifice for the sins of all those willing to repent and enter into a covenant with him, trusting in his righteousness or merits for salvation (Alma 22:14; Moroni 6:4), while all the rest must depend on their own good works for salvation, or answer the ends of the law themselves, falling short of the glory of God (2 Nephi 2:22–26; Romans 10:4). Furthermore, Christ brought about the universal resurrection of all men and women, as they were not responsible for the fall, leaving them to account only for their own deeds in the flesh (Articles of Faith 1:2; Alma 11:41–46).

Also, as the agent of the Father and judge of all, Christ is able to be both merciful and just (John 5:22; Romans 2:16). To obtain his mercy, or be saved from his wrath on the day of judgment, men and women must (1) have faith in Christ, (2) repent of their sins, (3) be baptized by one of his authorized agents in water in the likeness of his burial, to come forth born again of the Spirit, (4) receive the Holy Ghost by the laying on of hands, again by an authorized servant of God bearing his priesthood, and (5) endure with faith in Christ and repentance from sins to the end of their mortal lives. The LDS Church teaches that this is the only gospel ever taught by Jesus, and that it is imparted in the Bible, Doctrine and Covenants, and most plainly in the Book of Mormon. (See also 2 Nephi 25:24–30; Articles of Faith 1:1–4.)

Multiple scriptural names for this limited and oft-repeated body of teachings are: gospel of Jesus Christ (3 Nephi 27:13–22), doctrine of Christ (3 Nephi 11:31–41), plan of salvation, plan of redemption (Alma 11:40–41), words of eternal life (John 6:68), gospel of repentance, gospel of baptism, gospel of salvation, good tidings Isaiah 52:7), our report (Isaiah 53:1), gospel of the kingdom (Matthew 24:14), good tidings of great joy (Luke 2:10), gospel of the grace of God (Acts 2:24), gospel of peace (Romans 10:15), "good news", and other equivalent names. Once a man or woman has obeyed the first principles of the gospel, he or she must press forward, feasting on the words of Christ, going on to perfection through Christ (Hebrews 5:12–14; Hebrews 6:1–3).

The plan of salvation describes humanity's place in the universe and the purpose of life. The church teaches that there was a pre-mortal existence, a place which existed prior to mortality in which all people and all life were created in spirit form. Central to this is the notion that humans existed as spirits before birth, were raised by Heavenly Parents and had essential human characteristics such as gender.

During the pre-earth life, God the Father presented a plan to have a Savior make it possible for mankind to be saved. The purpose of an earth life was to give men the opportunity to demonstrate obedience to the commandments of God while outside of his presence. This is the central test of the evolution or eternal progression of man to godhood. Jesus Christ stepped forward as the chosen Savior. However, Lucifer, one of the spirits, proposed a rival plan whereby every soul would be saved, he would receive God's glory, and human agency would be eliminated. When God rejected that plan, the War in Heaven ensued, resulting in Lucifer and one-third part of the spirits being cast out and denied ever receiving physical bodies. Lucifer became Satan, or the devil.

The earth, according to church teachings in the temples, was created by Jehovah, which the church identifies as the pre-mortal Jesus, and Michael the archangel, who is identified as the pre-mortal Adam. The earth was "organized" from pre-existing matter, as were other planets with their inhabitants. Michael's spirit was placed into his body which was created by God the Father and Jehovah, and became a living soul known as Adam.

The church teaches that at birth, a pre-existing spirit enters a mortal body. Upon death, the spirit goes to a "spirit world" to await the resurrection of the dead. There, a preliminary judgment, based in part on whether a person has had a baptism by the authority of the priesthood and received their confirmation, either in this life or after death by proxy, places the spirit in either a state of paradise (has completed all the saving ordinances) or spirit prison (those who have not had the saving ordinances). Those in "prison" will be visited by spirits from paradise and given the chance to learn of the teachings of Jesus Christ and to accept the accompanying saving ordinances. The church teaches that all persons, wicked or righteous, will be resurrected and receive an immortal, physical body. The nature of that body, however, will depend on the result of the Last Judgment, at which Jesus will assign each soul to one of three degrees of glory (heavenly kingdoms): the celestial kingdom in the presence of the Father and the Son for those who accept Jesus Christ and receive all LDS saving ordinances, either as a mortal or by proxy; the terrestrial kingdom, a place of glory in the presence of Christ for righteous persons who refuse to receive the saving ordinances and for those who do not keep the covenants they commit to; and the telestial kingdom for the unrepentant wicked. A further destination, called outer darkness, is reserved for Satan, his devils, and those mortals who commit the unpardonable sin and thereby become the sons of perdition. Those who are ultimately destined for the telestial kingdom will be those who suffer for their sins in hell; however, these persons remain in hell only the 1000 years during the millennial reign of Christ, after which they will exit hell and be resurrected with an immortal body into a state of peace. The church also teaches that all animals have souls and, having been redeemed by the blood of Jesus Christ, will be resurrected, along with every human child who died before the age of accountability.

Those in the celestial kingdom will be allowed to continue to progress and become joint heirs with Jesus Christ; but only individuals that are in the highest degree of the celestial kingdom will eventually be enabled in eternity to become gods and goddesses and participate in the eternal creative process of having spirit children.

=== Prayer ===
The church encourages all people to pray often "for the evil spirit teacheth not a man to pray, but teacheth him that he must not pray." In LDS scripture Jesus tells his disciples, "Ye shall call upon the Father in my name." Prayer is viewed a means of communication between man and God. It is LDS belief that God hears the sincere prayers of all people because they are his children, he is no respecter of persons, and because he knows all things.

The church teaches that God is to be approached through prayer in reverence. Except for certain ordinances the specific words of a prayer do not have a prescribed form. Generally, prayer is addressed to God the Father, in the name of Jesus Christ, and thanks or petitions are expressed as prompted by the Holy Ghost.

=== Revelation ===
The church teaches that revelation from God continues today. Accordingly, revelation to direct the entire church comes to the President of the Church; revelation to direct a stake comes to the stake president; for a ward, to the bishop of that ward; and so forth. Latter-day Saints also believe that individuals can receive personal revelation and divine guidance in raising their families and managing their personal affairs. Because of their belief in modern revelation, Latter-day Saints give significant weight to the teachings of their church leaders. They revere the words their prophets and general authorities speak when "moved upon by the Holy Ghost" (Doctrine and Covenants 8:3–4) as modern-day scripture, and members are encouraged to ponder and pray for revelation regarding the truthfulness of such statements.

=== Family, gender, and sexuality ===
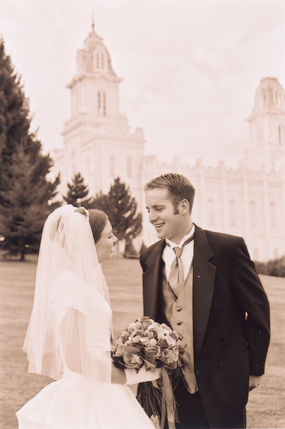
A couple following their temple marriage in the Manti Utah Temple

==== Family ====
The LDS Church has been characterized by its members as a family-centered religion. The church teaches that every being that lived upon the earth initially had a spirit body and that all were born to Heavenly Parents in a pre-mortal existence. The church teaches that on earth, families may be "sealed"—meaning that they are eternally bound as husband–wife, parents–child—and that these bonds will continue after death. Sealings can also include deceased ancestors, providing much of the church's rationale for its extensive family history activities. The church has prohibited polygamous marriages since 1904, however current church policies do still allow men to be sealed and have eternal marriages with multiple women if they are granted a sealing clearence for the new sealings; women must receive a cancellation of their sealing before being sealed to another man. Members tend more often to be married, and have families with more children, than members of other Christian traditions.

===== Exaltation and marriage =====
Exaltation is a belief in Mormonism that after death some people will reach the highest level of salvation in the celestial kingdom and eternally live in God's presence, continue as families, become gods, create worlds, and make spirit children over whom they will govern. In the LDS Church, top leaders have taught God wants exaltation for all humankind and that humans are "gods in embryo". A verse in the LDS Church's canonized scripture states that those who are exalted will become gods, and a 1925 statement from the church's highest governing body said that "All men and women are in the similitude of the universal Father and Mother ... [and are] capable, by experience through ages and aeons, of evolving into a God."

One of the key qualifications for exaltation is being united in a celestial marriage to an opposite-sex partner. Such a union can be created during mortality, or it can be created after death by proxy marriages; all such sealings, for the living or for the dead, are performed in temples.

==== Gender ====
Gender identity and roles play an important part in Mormon theology which teaches a strict binary of eternal, spiritual gender as literal offspring of heterosexual, cisgender Heavenly Parents. The church also teaches that each person's gender is eternal and that each gender has roles and duties in the family that are ordained by God. The church teaches that "fathers are to preside over their families in love and righteousness and are responsible to provide the necessities of life and protection for their families. Mothers are held to be primarily responsible for the nurture of their children. In these sacred responsibilities, fathers and mothers are obligated to help one another as equal partners. Some have characterized this view of the man-woman relationship as "equal but different". LDS women in the United States work outside the home in about the same percentage as other American women.

Only recently have top leaders begun directly addressing gender diversity and the experiences of transgender, non-binary, intersex, and other gender minorities whose gender identity and expression differ from the cisgender (i.e. non-transgender) majority. Transgender people and other gender minorities currently face membership restrictions in access to priesthood and temple rites in the church.

==== Sexuality ====
Sexuality has a prominent role within the theology of the church. In its standards for sexual behavior called the law of chastity, top LDS leaders bar all premarital sex, all homosexual sexual activity, the viewing of pornography, masturbation, and overtly sexual kissing, dancing, and touch outside marriage. LDS Leaders teach that gender is defined in premortal life, and that part of the purpose of mortal life is for men and women to be sealed together in heterosexual marriages, progress eternally after death as gods together, and produce spiritual children in the afterlife. The church states that sexual relations within the framework of monogamous opposite-sex marriage are healthy, necessary, and approved by God. The LDS church places great emphasis on the sexual behavior of Mormon adherents; a commitment to follow the law of chastity is required for baptism and to receive a temple recommend, while in the temple endowment ceremony participants agree to keep the law of chastity.

==== Homosexuality ====
All homosexual sexual activity is condemned as sinful by the Church of Jesus Christ of Latter-day Saints (LDS Church) in its law of chastity, and the church teaches that God does not approve of same-sex marriage. Adherents who participate in same-sex sexual behavior may face church discipline. Members of the church who experience homosexual attractions, including those who self-identify as gay, lesbian, or bisexual remain in good standing in the church if they abstain from same-sex marriage and any homosexual sexual activity or sexual relationships outside an opposite-sex marriage. However, all people, including those in same-sex relationships and marriages, are permitted to attend the weekly Sunday meetings. Church publications state that individuals do not choose their sexual orientation, its church-run therapy services no longer provides sexual orientation change efforts for gay members, and the church has no official stance on the causes of homosexuality.

In order to receive church ordinances such as baptism, and to enter church temples, non-heterosexual adherents are required to live a celibate lifestyle without any sexual expression. Additionally, in the church's plan of salvation non-celibate gay and lesbian individuals will not be allowed in the top tier of heaven to receive exaltation unless they repent during mortality, and a heterosexual marriage is a requirement for exaltation. The church's policies and treatment of LGBT people has long been a source of controversy both within and outside the church. They have also been a significant cause of disagreement and disaffection by members.

== Ordinances and covenants ==
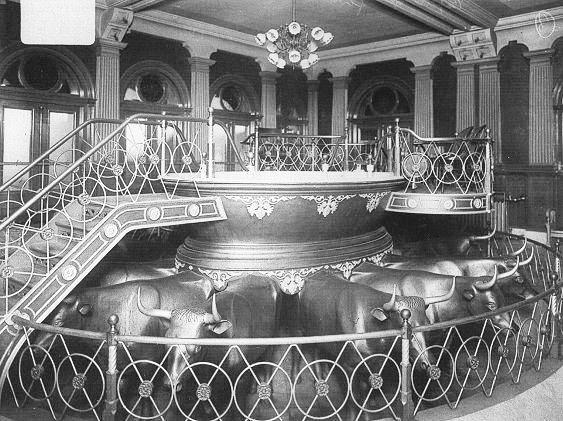
Baptismal font in the Salt Lake Temple, circa 1912, where baptisms for the dead are performed by proxy. The font rests on the backs of twelve oxen representing the Twelve Tribes of Israel.

Latter-day Saint sacraments are called ordinances, of which there are two types: saving ordinances and non-saving ordinances. All ordinances, whether saving or non-saving, must be performed by a man ordained to the appropriate priesthood office, with the exception of certain parts of the temple endowment and the initiatory or washings and anointings, in which men and women are separated, and women administer the ordinances for women, and men administer the ordinances for men. However, both men and women must be "set apart", or authorized and "blessed by the laying on of hands" by those who have proper authority before serving as temple ordinance workers.

Saving ordinances are those that are required for salvation or exaltation, and include baptism by immersion for the remission of sins; the laying on of hands for the gift of the Holy Ghost (confirmation of membership in the church of Jesus Christ); the "sacrament" of the Lord's supper, taken each Sunday, to keep in remembrance of the Atonement of Jesus Christ and to renew the covenants made at baptism; ordination to an office of the priesthood (for males); the initiatory or washings and anointings; the endowment; celestial marriage; and family sealings. Each saving ordinance is associated with one or more covenants that the person receiving the ordinance makes with God, and one or more blessing that God promises to the recipient.

Three primary covenants are administered by the LDS Church under the heading "new and everlasting covenant", called "new" because they have been restored again and "everlasting" because they are eternal with God. Specifically, they are the baptismal covenant; the priesthood covenant; and the marriage covenant. Each covenant, or "contract", between God and humans has one or more pre-requisites, offers one or more rewards, and specifies punishment for breaking it.

The first, the baptismal covenant, is entered into after the sincere communicant fulfills the pre-requisite of exercising faith in Christ, repents of his sins, is baptized by proper authority, receives the gift of the Holy Ghost, and promises to endure to the end of his mortal life continuing to exercise faith in Christ and repentance from his sins. He also agrees to stand as a witness for Christ at all times and in all places, and bear the burdens of his fellow servants Mosiah 18:9. The scriptures are replete with references to all these gospel elements (3 Nephi 27:13–22). The covenant maker receives the reward of the gift of the Holy Ghost, receives membership in the Church of Jesus Christ, receives forgiveness of sins, peace of conscience, a rebirth of the Spirit (Mosiah 4:1–13; Alma 5:49; Alma 7:14), grace, a hope in Christ, salvation or eternal life, and the joy of the saints. The punishment for breaking the covenant is perdition (Hebrews 10:25–31,39). The sacrament of the Lord's supper, or partaking of bread and wine instituted by Jesus, is in remembrance of this covenant, in remembrance of his blood, or atonement for sins, and the resurrection of his body.

Latter-day Saints believe the God of Abraham, Isaac, and Jacob is a God of covenants. In return for Abraham, Isaac, and Jacob's faith and obedience, God promised them (1) a numberless posterity, (2) a chosen land, and (3) the blessing of all nations through their posterity and the priesthood of their posterity, the "blessings of heaven". God promised Jacob's son, Joseph, additional blessings, a special land and a righteous branch to be separated from the rest of the house of Israel (Genesis 48; Genesis 49:22–26). Even later, promises and assurances were given through Moses and other prophets that, even though all Israel should be scattered and many persecuted, the earlier promises would not be forgotten, and a day of restoration and gathering would come in which all the tribes of Israel would be united in peace under the Lord. The Book of Mormon is said to be a witness to the truth of these promises, and it is an assurance that more of them will not be left unfulfilled.

The church teaches there are three rewards or degrees of glory in the heavenly world (1 Corinthians 15:29–,40-42; D&C 76; D&C 131:1–4), and that to obtain the highest degree of salvation (referred to as "exaltation" in the celestial kingdom), all people who have lived to the age of eight must participate in each of the saving ordinances. However, the church teaches that they may be performed for a person either during their lifetime or by proxy after the person has died. Therefore, church members participate in the saving ordinances on behalf of dead relatives and others whose names have been extracted from historical records. The performance of these proxy ordinances are one of the functions of the church's temples.

All the saving ordinances are currently open to all worthy church members of the appropriate age. Prior to 1978, black members were restricted from receiving the priesthood and from all ordinances performed in temples. Celestial marriage is open to one man and one woman at a time, but a man whose spouse has died may enter a second celestial marriage.

Apart from sealings to parents, the church does not perform saving ordinances for those younger than age eight or for those who have died before the age of eight (when children reach the "age of accountability"), because young children are deemed "alive in Christ" and not responsible for sin. Likewise, the church teaches that the saving ordinances are not required for persons age eight or older who are "mentally incapable of knowing right and wrong". These individuals are saved by the grace and mercy of Christ without baptism and will inherit the celestial kingdom of God.

Non-saving ordinances include the dedication of graves, the dedication of buildings, the prayer circle, the hosanna shout, shaking the dust from the feet, and various kinds of blessings, including the patriarchal blessing.

== Structure and practices ==
=== Leadership and hierarchy ===
The leader of the church is the President of the Church, and church members regard him as a prophet, seer, and revelator. He is often referred to by members of the church as "the Prophet" because the president is thought to hold the same divine calling as biblical prophets. The president's responsibility is primarily over the church as a whole. Church members believe his stewardship also extends to all humanity as the Lord's chosen mouthpiece. He is entitled to guide the church through revelation, acting as God's spokesman. After the death of church president, Russell M Nelson in September 2025. Dallin H. Oaks was sustained as the current President of the Church.

The First Presidency, the Quorum of the Twelve Apostles, the Presiding Bishopric and the First and Second Quorums of the Seventy are all referred to as general authorities because they direct the work of the entire church throughout the world. The members of the First Presidency and the Quorum of the Twelve Apostles are accepted by the church as prophets, seers, and revelators. All apostles serve in their positions until death; other general authorities are released from their service.

Other church authorities are referred to as "area authorities" and "local authorities" and include all other Quorums of the Seventy, mission presidents, temple presidents, stake presidents, bishops, and other priesthood quorum presidents.

The church has no salaried ministry; however, some general authorities receive stipends from the church, as needed, using income from church-owned investments. All local and area authorities are unpaid and continue in their normal occupations while serving in leadership positions.

Although the church had a paid local clergy in the 1800s, local and regional priesthood leaders currently serve as volunteers. Non-clerical church employees, general authorities (who serve life or five-year terms), and mission presidents are paid a stipend from church funds and provided other benefits. A general missionary fund covers the basic living expenses of single Mormon missionaries. Missionaries and their families are asked to contribute to this fund, and in the United States the missionary's congregation of origin is ultimately responsible to satisfy the monthly obligation to the general fund. Members volunteer general custodial work for local church facilities.

=== Hierarchy ===
The church has a hierarchical structure, with clearly defined stewardships or realms of responsibility for the various offices. Those who hold such offices do not elect to do so but are "called" by someone of a higher authority in the church.

The status of women in church leadership has remained largely unchanged since the early 1900s. Although they are not ordained to the priesthood, preaching and instruction by women is an integral part of weekly Latter-day Saint worship. Certain leadership positions are filled only by women, and in some of the church's auxiliary organizations women may preside over men. Since the 1840s, women have officiated in certain ordinances that take place inside temples.

==== Priesthood ====
The priesthood is offered to all male members ages 12 and older who follow the church's code of ethics, morality and behavior. Men receive the priesthood by ordination, which consists of other priesthood holders laying their hands on their head. Ordination to the priesthood is a prerequisite to preside in the church.

The priesthood is structured in a hierarchical manner, emphasizing obedience. Members are encouraged to avoid public criticism of priesthood leaders; repeated public criticism by an individual may eventually result in excommunication.

===== Aaronic priesthood =====
There is one priesthood with two levels; within each are different offices. The first level is the Aaronic Priesthood given to young men ages 12–17. The first office in this priesthood level is called a deacon; males aged 12 and 13 are ordained to this office. Their primary duty is to pass the sacrament to members on Sundays and collect fast offerings.

Teacher is the second office and is given to males ages 14 and 15. The primary duties of teachers are to prepare the sacrament, participate in home teaching, and assist members with their temporal needs if requested.

Priest is the third office in the Aaronic priesthood; this office given the males ages 16 and older. The primary duties of a priest is to bless the sacrament and participate in home teaching. Priests also have the authority to baptize individuals who choose to become members of the church. A priest can also confer the Aaronic priesthood or ordain others to the office of deacon, teacher, or priest.

Bishop is the highest office of the Aaronic Priesthood. A bishop must also be a high priest in the Melchizedek priesthood. A bishop's responsibility is to preside over a local group of Aaronic priesthood members and to act as the presiding high priest over a church congregation.

===== Melchizedek Priesthood =====
The second level of the priesthood is the Melchizedek priesthood. All Melchizedek priesthood holders are 18 or older but the offices do not have set ages for progression.

The first office is elder. An elder may confer the gift of the Holy Ghost; give blessings by the laying on of hands; ordain other elders; and perform any duty given to priests of the Aaronic priesthood.

A second office is high priest. A high priest is responsible for the spiritual welfare of their congregation of saints; may serve in a bishopric, stake presidency, high council, or temple presidency and may serve as a mission president. Further, he may ordain other high priests and elders; and can perform all the duties of both elder and Aaronic priesthood holders. Bishops, stake presidents, members of a stake high council, mission presidents, temple presidents, and members of the First Presidency must be ordained high priests.

A third office is patriarch. A patriarch's main responsibility is to provide patriarchal blessings for members of a stake or district (a geographic region of multiple congregations) and to declare an individual's lineage.

A fourth office is seventy. Those who hold this office are especial witnesses of Christ who assist the apostles in the administration of the church worldwide and in the church's areas. Each seventy is usually given a specific responsibility for a particular region.

The highest office of the Melchizedek priesthood is apostle. This office is reserved for members of the Quorum of the Twelves Apostles and members of the First Presidency. The main role of an apostle is to act as a special witness of Jesus Christ to the world at large and to oversee the spiritual and temporal administration of the church. The President of the Church is the person in the church who has been an ordained apostle for the longest period of time.

==== Organization ====
Under the leadership of the priesthood hierarchy are five auxiliary organizations that fill various roles in the church: Relief Society, Young Men organization, Young Women organization, Primary, and Sunday School.

The Relief Society is the church's women's organization. Founded in 1842 in Nauvoo, Illinois, and with the motto "Charity Never Faileth", the organization today includes more than 5.5 million women in over 170 countries. Every Latter-day Saint woman age 18 or older is a member of the Relief Society.

The Young Men and Young Women organizations are composed of adolescents aged 12 to 18. Members often have an additional meeting during the week (referred to as Mutual), which can involve an activity, game, service project, or instruction. The young men and women may meet separately or take part in a combined activities. Young men and the young women are encouraged to live by the standards outlined in the church's "For the Strength of Youth" booklet. They have also participated in the church's newly created "Children and Youth Program" since the beginning of 2020.

The Primary is an organization for children up to age 12, founded in 1878. It provides classes, music, and activities for children during the second hour of the Sunday meeting schedule.

The Sunday School organization provides classes for adolescents and adults during the second hour of the Sunday meeting schedule. It provides a variety of classes, including introductory classes for new members and nonmembers, and gospel doctrine classes for more experienced members. Adolescents are grouped into classes by age.

=== Duties and expectations of church members ===
For members of the church, the greatest commandment is to love God with all their heart and the second is to love others as they love themselves. All other commandments are considered appendages to these great commandments (Matt 22:37-40). Members are encouraged to pray several times a day, to perform good works, and to read scriptures daily.

==== Consecration and church service ====
Members are expected to donate their time, money, and talents to the church, and those who have participated in the endowment ceremony make an oath to donate all that they have, if required of them, to the Lord. To be in good standing and to enter the church's temples, church members are asked to tithe their income to the church, which is officially interpreted as 10 percent of annual income. In addition, members are invited to donate monthly charitable "fast offerings" (at least the equivalent cost of two meals), which are used to help the poor and needy in the community; members are also encouraged to make other humanitarian donations through the church.

==== Temple attendance and garment ====
Members who have participated in the temple endowment ceremony are expected to wear a temple garment under their clothing at all times. Members are told that they should not partially or completely remove the garment to participate in activities that can "reasonably be done with the garment worn properly beneath the clothing".

==== Callings and church service ====
Members are usually given "callings" or assignments in the church, and often attend various other meetings or activities throughout the week relating to that calling. Members are also expected to engage in missionary work, family history research, to conduct a Family Home Evening weekly with their family, and to attend the temple regularly. Church members are encouraged to live self-sufficiently and avoid unnecessary debt.

==== Word of Wisdom ====
Good standing in the church requires that members follow the "Word of Wisdom", a health code given by Joseph Smith which the church interprets as requiring abstinence from alcohol, tobacco, coffee, tea, and recreational drugs). Members must also obey the law of chastity and are strongly counseled against choosing an elective abortion, except in the cases of a pregnancy resulting from rape or incest, a pregnancy that seriously jeopardizes the life or health of the mother, or a pregnancy where a physician determines that the fetus has severe defects that will not allow the baby to survive beyond birth. In general, members are encouraged to obey the law of the country in which they live, although there have been notable exceptions. The church discourages gambling in all forms, including lotteries.

==== Serious violations ====
Church members who commit what are considered serious violations of the standards of the church (defined as, without limitation, "attempted murder, rape, sexual abuse, spouse abuse, intentional serious physical injury of others, adultery, fornication, homosexual relations, deliberate abandonment of family responsibilities, robbery, burglary, theft, embezzlement, sale of illegal drugs, fraud, perjury, and false swearing") may be subject to church disciplinary action, including disfellowshipment or excommunication. Such individuals are encouraged to continue attending church services, but are not permitted to hold church responsibilities or offer public prayer or sermons at any church meeting (although personal prayer is encouraged); excommunicated members are also prohibited from paying tithing or fast offerings. Such matters are generally kept private and other members are therefore frequently unaware of the status of such individuals.

==== Conformity of expression ====
Church members are permitted to think or believe freely on any issue, but are discouraged from publicly criticizing local leaders or general authorities; repeated public criticism of the church or its leaders may subject a person to church discipline for apostasy. The church maintains a Strengthening Church Members Committee which monitors members' publications and refers critical material to local authorities for possible disciplinary action.

==== Meeting attendance and Sabbath-day observance ====
Members are expected to attend the weekly two-hour church services on Sundays. Everyone is welcome to attend the public meetings of the church, whether or not they adhere to the church's lifestyle code. Additionally, Sunday is seen as the Sabbath day, where church members are expected to rest and devote their time to family and church service.

==== Organized worship and participation ====
The church provides several kinds of services and gatherings for participation by members and non-members, including weekly services on Sunday, periodic conferences such as the bi-annual general conference, and ritual services at the church's temples (for members only). All persons, regardless of their beliefs or standing in or out of the church, are welcome to attend non-temple church services and conferences. Women usually attend worship services wearing skirts or dresses, while men typically wear suits or dress shirts and ties. Children are also typically in their "Sunday best".

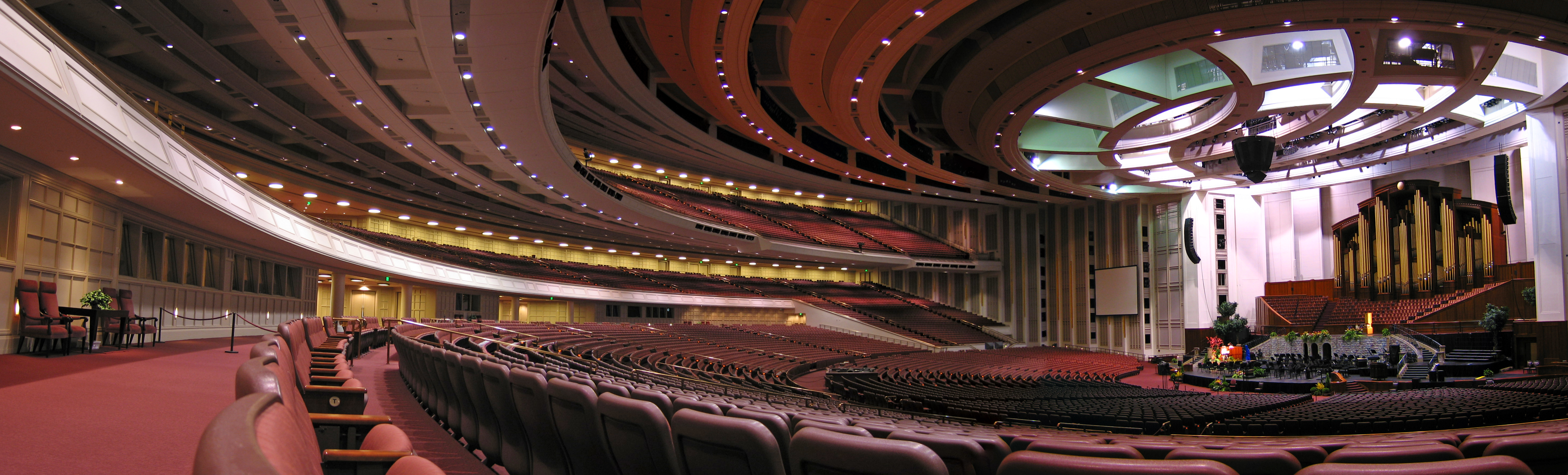
Interior of the LDS Conference Center where the Church holds its semi-annual General Conference

The church normally holds its standard worship services on Sunday during a two-hour block composed of three meetings: sacrament meeting, which features the church's weekly sacrament ritual and sermons by various selected members; and on rotation Sunday School, featuring a lesson on various scriptural topics; and finally each participant is assigned a meeting based on their age and sex, which could include a meeting of priesthood holders for males aged 12 and up separated into age-specific quorums, Relief Society for adult women, and a meeting of the Young Women organization for adolescent females. During the second hour, children under age 12 participate in activities of the Primary. Periodically, members participate in local, regional, and general church-wide conferences in lieu of Sunday services. General conference is broadcast in April and October from Salt Lake City, Utah.

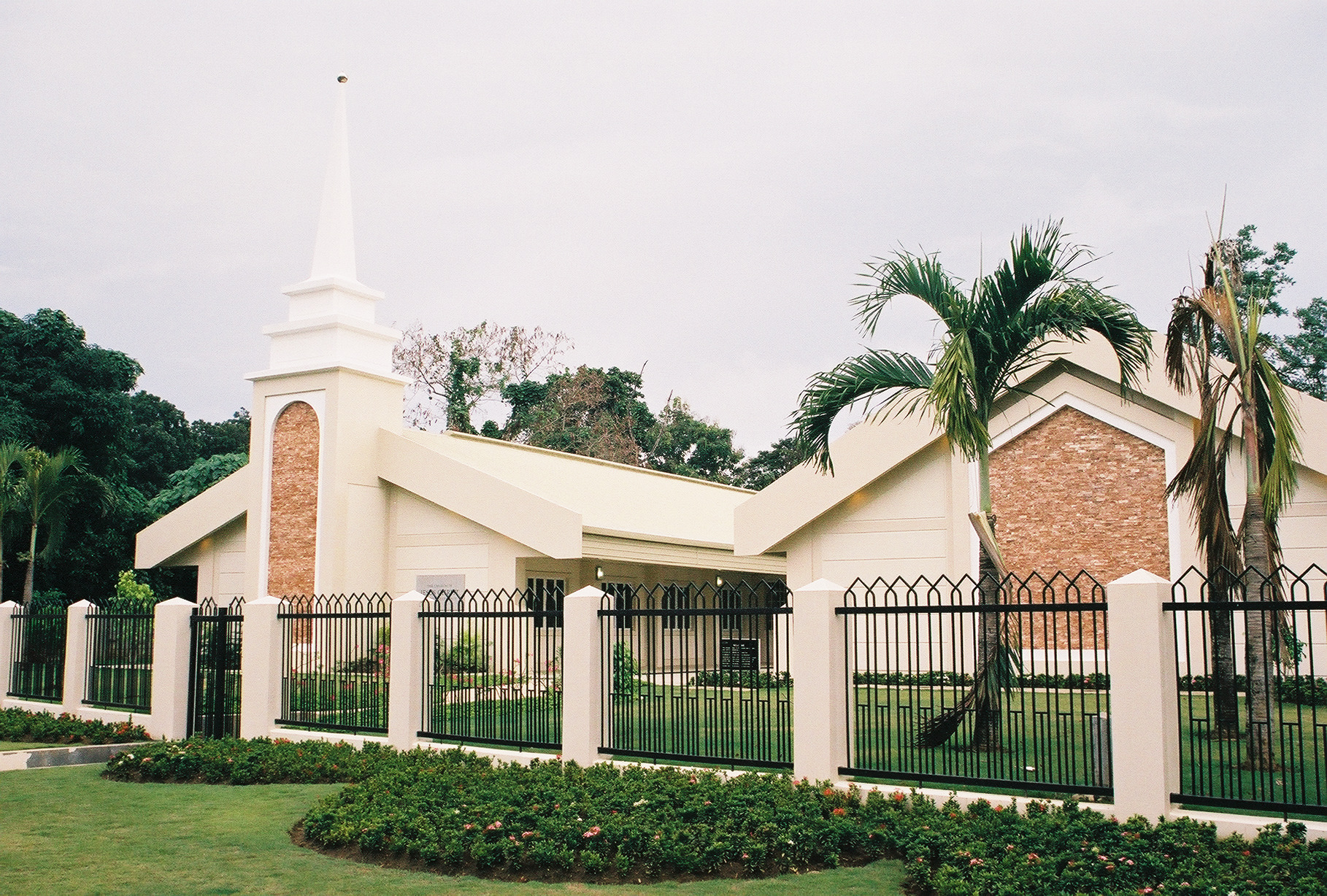
Latter-day Saint chapel in Puerto Princesa, Philippines

The church also provides ritual services at its temples, which are open only to members of the appropriate age who meet standards of orthodoxy and worthiness. Members are encouraged to attend the temples regularly, where they usually participate in the endowment, sealing, washing and anointing, and other ordinances, most often by proxy for the dead.

==== Missionary service ====
Young men between the ages of 18 and 25 who meet standards of worthiness and preparation are encouraged to serve a two-year, full-time proselytizing mission. Women who desire to serve a mission must be at least 18 and generally serve 18-month missions. Retired married couples are encouraged to serve missions as well, and their length of service varies from three to 36 months.

As of December 2013 there were 405 missions and approximately 83,000 full-time proselytizing missionaries serving throughout the world. In addition, about 8,500 missionaries are on special assignment missions, serving as health care specialists, doctors, craftsmen, artisans, construction supervisors, agricultural experts and educators for developing countries and educators, family history researchers and leadership trainers.

In June 2007, the church marked the induction of its one millionth missionary since 1830.

== See also ==
- Mormonism and Christianity
- Mormon studies
- Teachings of Joseph Smith
