= President (LDS Church honorific) =

President is an honorific title in the Church of Jesus Christ of Latter-day Saints (LDS Church) given to members who hold certain leadership positions.

== General leaders ==
The title of "President" is given to a number of general leaders of the LDS Church. The President of the Church and his counselors in the First Presidency are usually referred to as "President". The President of the Quorum of the Twelve Apostles is referred to as "President", as is the Acting President of the Quorum of the Twelve Apostles (if any). Historically, Assistant President of the Church was also given this title.

Historically, women and men who served as general presidents of the Relief Society, Young Women, Primary, Young Men, or Sunday School organizations were not referred to as "President"; instead "Sister" or "Brother", the common courtesy title for adult members was used. However, around 2020, official church sources started referring to these leaders as "President".

== Local leaders ==
The title of "President" is given to a number of local leaders of the LDS Church. Presidents of stakes, missions, districts, and temples are referred to as "President", as are their two counselors. A branch president is given the title "President", but his counselors in the branch presidency are not. Similarly, presidents of the church's elders, teachers, and deacons quorums may be given the title of "President", though their counselors are not. Like the change at the general level, local organizational presidents are now more frequently referred to as "President."

== Presidents not given the title ==
The seven members of the Presidency of the Seventy are given the honorific title "Elder" rather than "President", even though they are the presidents of the church's quorums of the Seventy.

== See also ==
- Index of religious honorifics and titles § Latter Day Saints
