= Stake and ward council meetings =

Stake and ward councils are meetings of local congregations within the Church of Jesus Christ of Latter-day Saints (LDS Church).

A ward is a standard local congregation unit, while a stake is made up of several wards. This arrangement is roughly comparable to diocese and archdiocese in the Roman Catholic faith.

These LDS Church council meetings include:

== Principal councils ==
- A high council meeting which typically consists of the fifteen men who form the leadership for a stake. The meeting is generally held semi-monthly to administer the business of the stake. Its participants include the three members of the stake presidency and the twelve members of the stake high council. The stake clerk and stake executive secretary also attend, while others may be invited to participate, depending on the needs of the discussion. (Note: Prior to March 2018, this meeting was termed "the stake priesthood executive committee" [PEC].)
- A stake council is an expanded group that meets regularly. Along with those noted above who attend the high council meeting, the stake council includes the presidents of the stake's Relief Society, Young Men, Young Women, Primary, and Sunday School organizations. Others, such as an employment or music specialist, may be invited as needed.
- A bishopric meeting, is typically held weekly at the ward—level. It includes the three members of the bishopric, the ward clerk, and the ward executive secretary. As needed, the meeting can be expanded and invite other appropriate individuals to address issues thought to be especially sensitive.
- A ward council meets regularly and typically includes the bishopric, ward clerk, executive secretary, and presidents of the elders quorum, Relief Society, Young Women, Primary, and Sunday School organizations. Others may be invited, as needed.
- A now-defunct committee was "the ward priesthood executive council". Before March 2018, it met weekly and was composed of the ward's priesthood leaders identified above as well as the leader of the then-existent high priests group, excluding the leaders of the various organizations.

In student and singles wards where not all these offices exist, the counselors of the elders quorum president are often involved in the ward council as well.

== Purpose-specific supplementary councils or meetings ==
Descriptions of some other regular meetings within the church follow.

- The ward youth council (formerly bishopric youth committee) typically meets monthly and includes the bishopric, youth who serve as an assistant in the priests quorum, the presidents of the teachers and deacons quorums, the Young Women class presidents (formerly Laurel, Mia Maid, or Beehive), and the ward Young Women president.
- The ward young single adult committee meet regularly and includes a counselor from the bishopric, the Relief Society presidency, and the elders quorum presidency, along with young single adult leaders, and the married couple serving as young single adult advisers.
- The missionary coordination meeting includes the ward mission leader, ward missionaries, and local full-time missionaries, where available. In addition, a counselor from the Relief Society presidency, the elders quorum presidency, the oldest Young Women class presidency and an assistant from the priests quorum presidency are invited.
- The bishops' welfare council typically meets quarterly and includes the bishops and branch presidents in the stake and welfare specialists, as needed.

== See also ==
- Quorum (Latter Day Saints)

== Sources ==
- Jason Swensen (March 31, 2018). "President Nelson announces major changes to structure of LDS priesthood quorums". Deseret News. Archived from the original on April 1, 2018.
- The Church of Jesus Christ of Latter day Saints, March 31, 2018, General Conference, Priesthood Session.
- Bradford, David C., "Priesthood Executive Council, Ward and Stake" in Ludlow, Daniel H., ed., Priesthood and Church Organization: Selections from the Encyclopedia of Mormonism (Salt Lake City: Deseret Book, 1995) p. 290
