= Priesthood (LDS Church) =

Authority to act for God in the LDS Church

In the Church of Jesus Christ of Latter-day Saints (LDS Church), the largest denomination in the Latter Day Saint movement, the priesthood is the power and authority to act in the name of God for the salvation of humankind. Male members of the church who meet standards of worthy behavior and church participation are generally ordained to specific offices within the priesthood.

== Divisions ==
The priesthood authority is divided into two divisions or "orders": the Melchizedek priesthood and the Aaronic priesthood. The Melchizedek priesthood encompasses all priesthood authority; the Aaronic priesthood is therefore an appendage or subdivision of the Melchizedek priesthood.

== Requirements for ordination ==
The Aaronic priesthood is conferred upon male church members beginning at age eleven by the laying on of hands by men who hold either an office in the Melchizedek priesthood or the office of priest in the Aaronic priesthood. Ordination to the priesthood is based on the recipient's personal moral worthiness and church participation without regard to education or other socioeconomic status, and, since 1978, without regard to race. (Previously, most members of black African descent were excluded from priesthood ordination.) To receive the Melchizedek priesthood in the church today, the recipient must hold the Aaronic priesthood and be at least 18 years old. Some special cases may not permit initial or continuing ordination, such as children living with a same-sex couple.

If a worthy adult man joins the LDS Church, he may first have the Aaronic priesthood conferred upon him. After a period of time (usually about one year), the man may have the Melchizedek priesthood conferred upon him.

=== Ineligible groups of members ===
Some members of the church were historically or are currently ineligible for receiving the priesthood. Women have always been denied the priesthood. The denial of priesthood to women has received criticism including by Ordain Women, an independent organization of current and former church members. For about 130 years (between 1847 and 1978) all LDS endowment-related temple ordinances and priesthood ordinations were denied to all Black people in a controversial priesthood racial restriction. As of 2023, all priesthood ordinations continue to be denied for any person in a same-sex marriage or homosexual sexual relationship, and transgender individuals including trans men continue to be ineligible for all priesthood ordinations. These restrictions have also garnered criticism from both outside, and inside the LDS church.

== Ordinance and oath and covenant ==
The church teaches that receiving the priesthood is a saving ordinance for males. Like all saving ordinances of the church, it is accompanied by the recipient making a covenant with God. In addition, the reception of the Melchizedek priesthood is said to constitute an "unspoken oath as well as [a] covenant". A manual for LDS Church priesthood holders states that "this means that Heavenly Father gives us His oath (guarantee) that we can have the power and blessings of the priesthood if we covenant (promise) with Him to do certain things." The recipient of the Melchizedek priesthood promises by covenant that he will "magnify" his assigned calling in the priesthood. In exchange, God promises by oath and covenant that the recipients will be "sanctified by the [Holy] Spirit unto the renewing of their bodies"; that they will become the sons of Moses and Aaron and the seed of Abraham; and that they will receive exaltation and ultimately receive all that God has.

== Offices and quorums of the priesthood ==
Every holder of the priesthood is ordained to one or more priesthood offices. All priesthood holders have the same priesthood authority; however, the authority to exercise certain powers of the priesthood are divided according to priesthood office. A person may hold more than one priesthood office; in fact, once a person is ordained to a priesthood office, the person holds that priesthood office for as long as he holds the priesthood.

=== Offices of the Melchizedek priesthood ===
Office	Minimum requirement to be ordained to office	Rights and responsibilities
Apostle	Married holder of the Melchizedek priesthood	"Special witnesses" of Jesus Christ who hold the rights to officiate in all responsibilities and duties of the priesthood, including the sealing power. Apostles direct the calling of patriarchs and may ordain persons to all other offices and callings in the church. The President of the Church must be an apostle.
Seventy	Holder of the Melchizedek priesthood	"Especial witnesses" of Jesus Christ; called to preach the gospel to the world; work under the direction of apostles; may be general or area authorities
Patriarch	Married holder of the Melchizedek priesthood; normally at least 55 years old	Gives patriarchal blessings to Latter-day Saints
High Priest	Holder of the Melchizedek priesthood	Responsible for the spiritual welfare of the Latter-day Saints; may serve as a bishop, stake president, mission president, or temple president; may ordain other High Priests and Elders
Elder	Holder of the Aaronic priesthood; at least 18 years old	Confer the gift of the Holy Ghost; give blessings by the laying on of hands; ordain other Elders; all rights of the Aaronic priesthood

=== Quorums of the Melchizedek priesthood ===
Holders of priesthood offices are organized into quorums. The quorums are a brotherhood where members of the quorum assist each other, teach one another, and delegate particular responsibilities to individuals or committees. Often members of the church who do not maintain the standards and people who are not members of the church are invited to participate in the quorum to enjoy the brotherhood and support, although they may not be given certain quorum responsibilities.

Priesthood office	Name of quorum	Quorum leadership structure	Maximum number in quorum and notes
Apostle	Quorum of the Twelve Apostles	One president, no counselors	12; other apostles may be in Quorum of First Presidency or in no quorum
Seventy	Quorums of the Seventy (currently numbered First through Eighth)	All seventies quorums presided over by a single set of seven co-equal presidents with no counselors	70; some are quorums of general authorities; others are quorums of area authorities
Patriarch	No quorum organization	No quorum organization; until 1979 a Presiding Patriarch existed	See below.
High Priest	High Priests Quorum (stake)	Quorum presidency is the stake president and his two counselors	Includes the (usually 1) functioning stake patriarch, members of bishoprics (3 per ward) within the stake, the 12-member stake high council (as presided over by the 3-member Stake Presidency)
Elder	Elders Quorum	Quorum presidency is one president with two counselors	96; in addition, high priests that are not in the high priests quorum, adult males without the priesthood and adult holders of the Aaronic priesthood are invited to attend Elders Quorum

In order to be called to the Aaronic priesthood office of bishop, a man must hold the Melchizedek priesthood and be a high priest.

=== Offices and quorums of the Aaronic priesthood ===
Office	Minimum requirements to be ordained to office	Rights and responsibilities	Name of quorum organization	Quorum leadership structure	Maximum number in quorum
Bishop	Married adult male; high priest in Melchizedek priesthood	See Bishop (Latter Day Saints)	No quorum of bishops, but presided over by a general Presiding Bishop	No quorum of bishops; bishop is president of the Priests Quorum and a member of the stake High Priests Quorum	
Priest	16-year-old baptized male	Bless the sacrament; baptize; give others the Aaronic priesthood and ordain other to the offices of priest, teacher and deacon; all rights of a teacher	Priests Quorum	Quorum presidency is the bishop with two priest assistants and may also call a secretary	48
Teacher	14-year-old baptized male	Prepare the sacrament; ministering; all rights of a deacon	Teachers Quorum	Quorum presidency is a president with two counselors and a secretary	24
Deacon	12-year-old baptized male	Keys of the ministering of angels; pass the sacrament to the congregation; collect fast offerings; other duties as assigned by bishop	Deacons Quorum	Quorum presidency is a president with two counselors and a secretary	12

== Priesthood leadership callings ==
In addition to the regular offices of the Aaronic or Melchizedek priesthood, there are other leadership callings within the priesthood. The table below lists these other priesthood leadership callings and the table below it shows how the various callings are organized within the hierarchy of the church.

Leadership calling	Minimum qualifications	Rights and responsibilities
President of the Church and counselor in the First Presidency	President must be an apostle; counselors must be high priests	Preside over and direct the entire church
Area president and counselors	All must be seventies or apostles	Preside over and direct a geographical region ("area") of the church
Stake president and counselors	All must be high priests	Preside over and direct a stake of the church
Stake high councilors	Must be high priests	Assist the stake presidency in governing the stake
Mission president and counselors	Mission president must be high priest; counselors must hold Melchizedek priesthood	Preside over and direct a mission of the church and the full-time missionaries in the mission
District president and counselors	All must hold Melchizedek priesthood	Preside over and direct a district of a mission
Temple president and counselors	All must be high priests	Preside over and direct the operation of a temple

Hierarchy of leadership

General authorities
The First Presidency: The president of the Church, 1st counselor and 2nd counselor
The Quorum of the Twelve Apostles: President of the Quorum of the Twelve Apostles and eleven other apostles
Quorums of the Seventy; The Seven Presidents of the Seventy and several dozen seventies: First Quorum of the Seventy / Second Quorum of the Seventy
Area presidencies: Presidents and 1st and 2nd counselors are filled by seventies
Local authorities
Third, Fourth, Fifth, Sixth, Seventh, and Eighth Quorums of the Seventy (area seventies)						Temple presidencies
Stake presidencies and stake high councils					Mission presidencies	Temple presidencies
Ward bishoprics or branch presidencies			Elders quorums	High priests quorums	Mission presidencies	Temple presidencies
Deacons quorums	Teachers quorums	Priests quorums	Elders quorums	High priests quorums	Mission presidencies	Temple presidencies

== History ==
Because Latter-day Saints believe that priesthood authority and keys may be granted only by one who holds that authority or keys, they believe it is important that a person trace their priesthood through a line of succession from a person in the Bible who was known to hold that authority or keys. Moreover, Latter-day Saints believe that the priesthood authority was absent from the earth during the Great Apostasy, and that priesthood had to be restored through Joseph Smith. Catholic and Orthodox Christians do not believe that such a complete apostasy ever took place when defending the validity of their priesthoods, and these churches do not recognize the priesthood exercised by Latter-day Saints.

Latter-day Saints believe that ancient prophets and apostles conferred the priesthood directly upon Smith and other early members of the movement.

In 1834, Oliver Cowdery provided the first public announcement that the priesthood had been conferred by John the Baptist on May 15, 1829. Cowdery's account was essentially confirmed by Smith.

Unlike the restoration of the Aaronic priesthood, Smith never provided a date for the restoration of the Melchizedek priesthood, and never clearly indicated how this authority was conferred. Smith first specifically introduced the Melchizedek or high priesthood to the church in 1831. In his 1832 history, he referred to "a confirmation and reception of the high Priesthood after the holy order of the son of the living God power and ordinence from on high to preach the Gospel in the administration and demonstration of the spirit the Kees of the Kingdom of God conferred on him [Smith] and the continuation of the blessings of God to him &c".

Though specific details were lacking, by the turn of the 20th century, Latter-day Saint theologians were convinced that such a conferral had occurred prior to the organization of the Church of Christ on April 6, 1830.

In addition to the restoration of the Melchizedek priesthood (and the keys of the apostleship), additional priesthood keys were conferred on Joseph Smith and others. Smith dictated the following passage as a revelation following the dedication of the Kirtland Temple:

After this vision closed, the heavens were again opened unto us; and Moses appeared before us, and committed unto us the keys of the gathering of Israel from the four parts of the earth, and the leading of the ten tribes from the land of the north. After this, Elias appeared, and committed the dispensation of the gospel of Abraham, saying that in us and our seed all generations after us should be blessed. After this vision had closed, another great and glorious vision burst upon us; for Elijah the prophet, who was taken to heaven without tasting death, stood before us, and said: Behold, the time has fully come, which was spoken of by the mouth of Malachi—testifying that he [Elijah] should be sent, before the great and dreadful day of the Lord come—To turn the hearts of the fathers to the children, and the children to the fathers, lest the whole earth be smitten with a curse—Therefore, the keys of this dispensation are committed into your hands; and by this ye may know that the great and dreadful day of the Lord is near, even at the doors.

== Use of the priesthood ==
Unrighteous dominion is a principle taught by the LDS Church which at its core holds that those given priesthood authority may not use that power as a means of imposing compliance to their will, especially in contravention of moral and ethical conduct. This teaching extends to all church members, in any area of responsibility, including personal and family relationships, church callings, business dealings, and public positions of trust. Church members are taught to identify it, and avoid it.

In a noted address on pride, LDS Church president Ezra Taft Benson said that unrighteous dominion is a form of contention and pride. The use of power or influence to cover-up sin, indulge in vain ambitions or self-righteous conduct is considered unrighteous dominion. Abuse, including verbal, physical, and sexual is considered unrighteous dominion.

Unrighteous dominion is considered a sin, for which repentance (and in some cases restitution) is required. It may also result in disciplinary actions by the church, which vary based on the nature and severity of the situation; a subsequent church president, Gordon B. Hinckley, specifically stated that "[a]ny man who engages in this practice is unworthy to hold a temple recommend." Penalties, up to and including excommunication, may come into play. If acts stemming from unrighteous dominion are criminal in nature, the church may be obliged to disclose the facts of the case to the proper law enforcement officials.

== See also ==
- Priesthood (Latter Day Saints)
- High priest (Latter Day Saints)
- Covenant (Latter Day Saints)
- Laity
- Stake and ward council meetings
- Ordain Women
- Ordinance (Latter Day Saints)
- Black people and priesthood (LDS)
