= Francisco Dique Sousa =

Mozambican Mormon leader

Francisco Dique Sousa was a leading organizer of the Church of Jesus Christ of Latter-day Saints (LDS Church) in Mozambique.

Sousa's future son-in-law, Chico Mapenda, had joined the LDS Church while studying in the German Democratic Republic. In 1990, when Germany was reunified, Mapenda was sent back to Mozambique. Francisco Dique Sousa had previously been a Protestant minister and was baptized in 1995. He and Mapenda shared the message of the restored gospel of Jesus Christ with people in Marromeu. Mapenda shared the gospel with other relatives in other locations, such as Sousa's son Maria Dique and her husband Chico Casse Morgan in Manga. Due to these efforts, when LDS Church missionaries arrived in Marromeu in 1996 they were able to teach and baptized about 50 people very quickly. When a branch was organized in Marromeu in 2000, Sousa became its first president.

The year before when a branch was organized in Beira, the branch president was Augusto Cherequejanhe, another son-in-law of Sousa's who had been introduced to the LDS Church by Sousa. When the Beira Mozambique District of the church was organized in April 2003, Augusto Cherequejanhe was the president with Chico Mapenda serving as his first counselor. In 1999, Sousa's grandson Jorge Chene Maunga was the first person called as a full-time missionary from Mozambique by the LDS Church.
