= Chico Mapenda =

Chico Tomo Antonio Mapenda
- Born: 1969 (age 56–57); Beira, Mozambique
- Occupations: Religious leader, educator
- Known for: First Mozambican convert to the LDS Church; early church leadership in Mozambique
- Relatives: Gimo Mapenda (brother)

Chico Tomo Antonio Mapenda (born 1969) was the first Mozambican convert to the Church of Jesus Christ of Latter-day Saints (LDS Church). He was a key figure in the establishment of a firm base for the church in Mozambique in the 1990s.

== Biography ==
In 1982, Mapenda left his home town of Beira to go study in the German Democratic Republic. At the time, many people in Mozambique had strong Marxist-Leninist political views which had caused the country to align with Communist bloc countries.

In 1989, Mapenda met LDS Church missionaries and received from them a copy of the Book of Mormon in Portuguese. He was baptized into the LDS Church on 14 January 1990 in East Germany. He was also ordained a priest while he was still in East Germany.

With the reunification of Germany, Mapenda was forced to return to Mozambique. He had married a fellow Mozambican while in Germany and on returning to Mozambique introduced the restored gospel of Jesus Christ to his father-in-law Francisco Dique Sousa.

Mapenda's brother, Gimo Mapenda, who was a Protestant minister, also listened to the message of the restored gospel of Jesus Christ, believed it and helped spread the church's teachings in Mozambique.

In 2003, when the Beira Mozambique District was organized, Chico Mapenda became the first counselor in the district presidency.

== Sources ==
- 2008 Deseret Morning News Church Almanac (Salt Lake City, Utah: Deseret Morning News, 2007) pp. 423–424
- Garr et al., Encyclopedia of Latter-day Saint History, p. 803*Church News, May 17, 2003
- Global Mormonism Project - Mozambique, Brigham Young University
- Kirken bliver ved med at vokse i Afrika (Danish)
