= High priest (Latter Day Saints) =

Office of the priesthood in Mormonism

In most denominations of the Latter Day Saint movement, a high priest is an office of the priesthood within the Melchizedek priesthood. High priests are typically more experienced leaders within the priesthood. The term derives in part from the Epistle to the Hebrews, which describes Jesus as "a high priest after the order of Melchizedek" (5:10; see also 6:20). Movement founder Joseph Smith ordained the first high priests on June 3, 1831.

High priests are organized into quorums. The first president of a high priests quorum of the church was Smith's younger brother, Don Carlos Smith.

== High priests in The Church of Jesus Christ of Latter-day Saints ==
In the Church of Jesus Christ of Latter-day Saints (LDS Church), high priests are primarily responsible for the spiritual welfare of the members and the administration of local church units called wards and stakes.

Melchizedek priesthood holders in the church are ordained high priests when they become a member of a stake presidency, stake high council, or bishopric, "or when otherwise determined by the stake president". Ordinations are approved by the member's bishop and stake president and the common consent of the general priesthood membership in the stake. A man must hold the Melchizedek priesthood and hold the priesthood office of elder before he may become a high priest. Ordination is done by another high priest by the laying on of hands.

Like other priesthood offices in the LDS Church, high priests are organized into quorums. The high priests quorum is organized at the stake level, with the president of the quorum being the stake president. (In contrast, priesthood quorums for the offices of deacon, teacher, priest, and elder are organized at the ward level.) Prior to 2018, the stake president would organize a high priest "group" in each ward. Each group was provided with a group leader, who typically selected two assistants and a secretary to assist him. However, following changes announced in the April 2018 general conference, the high priest groups were disbanded at the ward level. The high priest quorum on the stake level now consists of high priests currently serving in the stake presidency, as a high councilor, in a bishopric, or as a functioning patriarch. High priests not currently serving in those callings are members of their ward's elders quorum.

In a district, there is no high priests quorum.

There are a number of positions in the LDS Church which may only be filled by a high priest. Among these are the stake president and his counselors, members of a stake high council, mission president, and member of a temple presidency. A bishop must be a high priest (unless he has a right-by-lineage to the calling). A bishop's counselors are also high priests, and are ordained as such prior to being set apart in the bishopric. Any high priest may become a member of the First Presidency, but in recent practice most members of the First Presidency have been apostles.

Since 1995, individuals ordained to the office of seventy are ordained first to the office of high priest.

== See also ==
- Priesthood (LDS Church)
- Aaronic priesthood (Latter Day Saints)
