= Ward (LDS Church) =

Type of local congregation in the LDS Church

A ward is a local congregation in the Church of Jesus Christ of Latter-day Saints (LDS Church), with a smaller local congregation known as a branch.

A ward is presided over by a bishop, the equivalent of a pastor in many other Christian denominations. As with all local LDS Church leadership, the bishop is considered lay clergy and as such is not paid. Two counselors serve with the bishop to help with administrative and spiritual duties of the ward and to preside in the absence of the bishop. Together, these three men (never women) constitute the bishopric. A branch is presided over by a branch president who may also have one or two counselors, depending on the size of the branch. Groups of wards are organized into stakes, while groups of branches are generally organized into districts.

== Historical origin ==
The term ward originally referred to the political subdivision of some of the municipalities in the mid-western United States where members of the LDS Church resided, and in particular the political organization of Nauvoo, Illinois, in the 1840s. Bishops were assigned duties and responsibility over specific ward boundaries in these cities, and over time individual congregations were defined by these boundaries. After the Mormon Exodus to Utah, this same terminology was preserved in the establishment of communities throughout the western United States. Voting districts of several Utah communities still follow the historical boundaries of their original LDS Church congregations. Due to the religious connection of this term, traditional LDS pioneer communities generally do not use the term ward to define voting districts for political purposes.

== Wards and branches ==
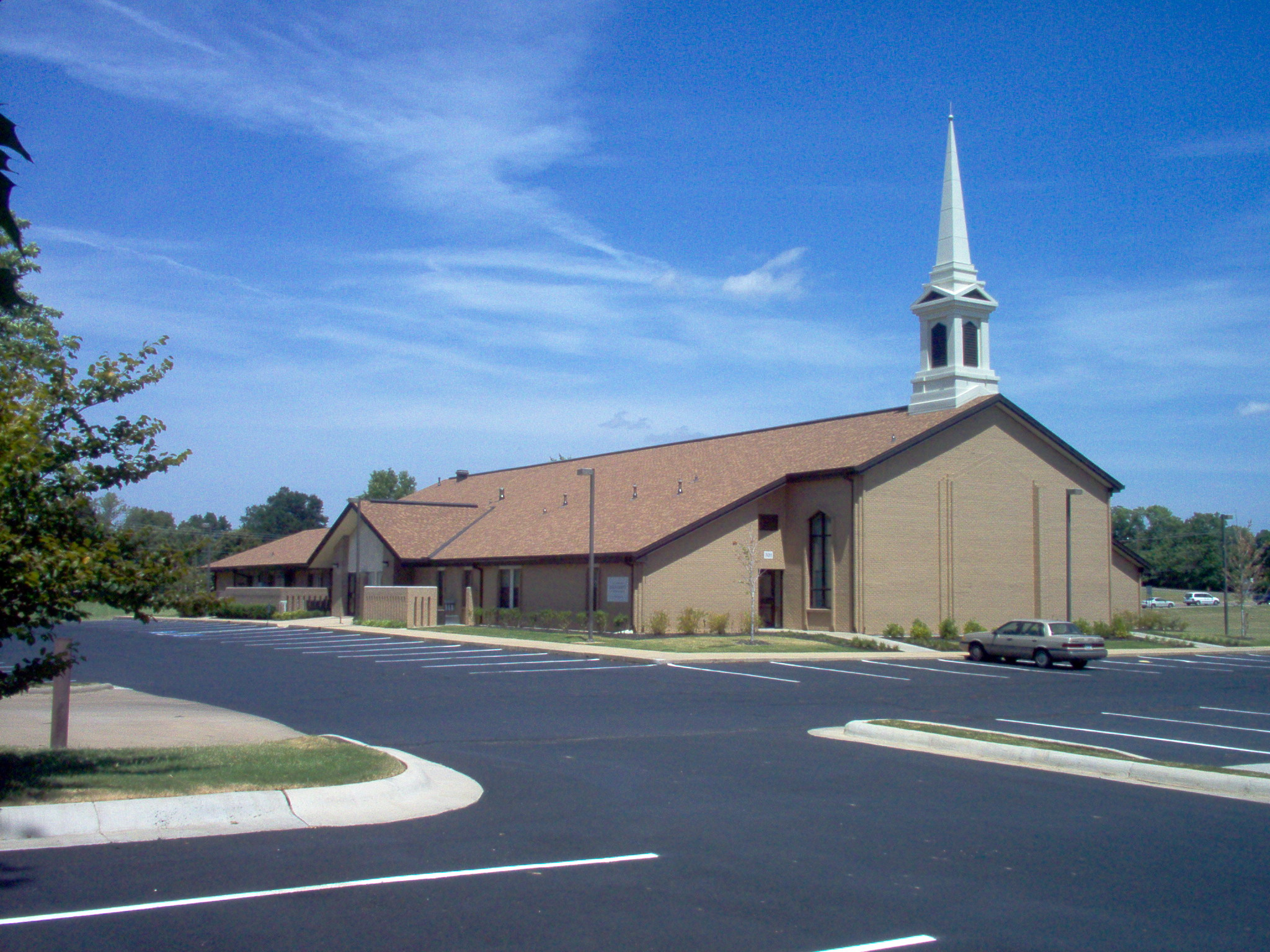
A meetinghouse that serves local ward congregations

=== Wards ===
A ward typically consists of 150 to 500 church members in an area within a reasonable travel time of the meetinghouse ("reasonable" will vary between countries and regions). A stake, the next highest level of organization, may be created if there are at least five ward-sized branches in adjacent areas. Once the stake has been organized, the ward-sized branches are organized into wards. Beginning in 2024, the LDS Church unified standards worldwide for creation of wards as shown in table below. Prior to 2024, within the United States and Canada, a minimum of 300 members was required to create a ward; elsewhere, a minimum of 150 members was required.

Minimum requirements to become a ward	2024 Standardization	Prior to 2024	
Minimum requirements to become a ward	Worldwide	US & Canada	Rest of world
Total Members (Note: includes both attending and not attending)	250	300	150
AFTMPH (Note: AFTMPH: Active, Full-Tithe-Paying Melchizedek Priesthood Holders)	20	20	15
Participating Adults (Note: Participating adults are individuals who pay full or partial tithes, hold a current temple recommend, have a calling in the Church, or are new members who are attending sacrament meeting during their first year of membership.)	100	none specified	
Participating Youth (Note: Participating youth are youth enrolled in seminary.)	20 (Note: recommended but not required)	none specified	
Minimum requirements to become a stake

If there are not sufficient congregations in an area to form a stake, a district (analogous to but smaller than a stake) is formed to oversee local congregations. There is no minimum or maximum geographical size for a ward: In areas where there are greater numbers of active church members (such as urban and suburban areas in Utah), several wards can exist in only 1 square mile (2.6 km^{2}).

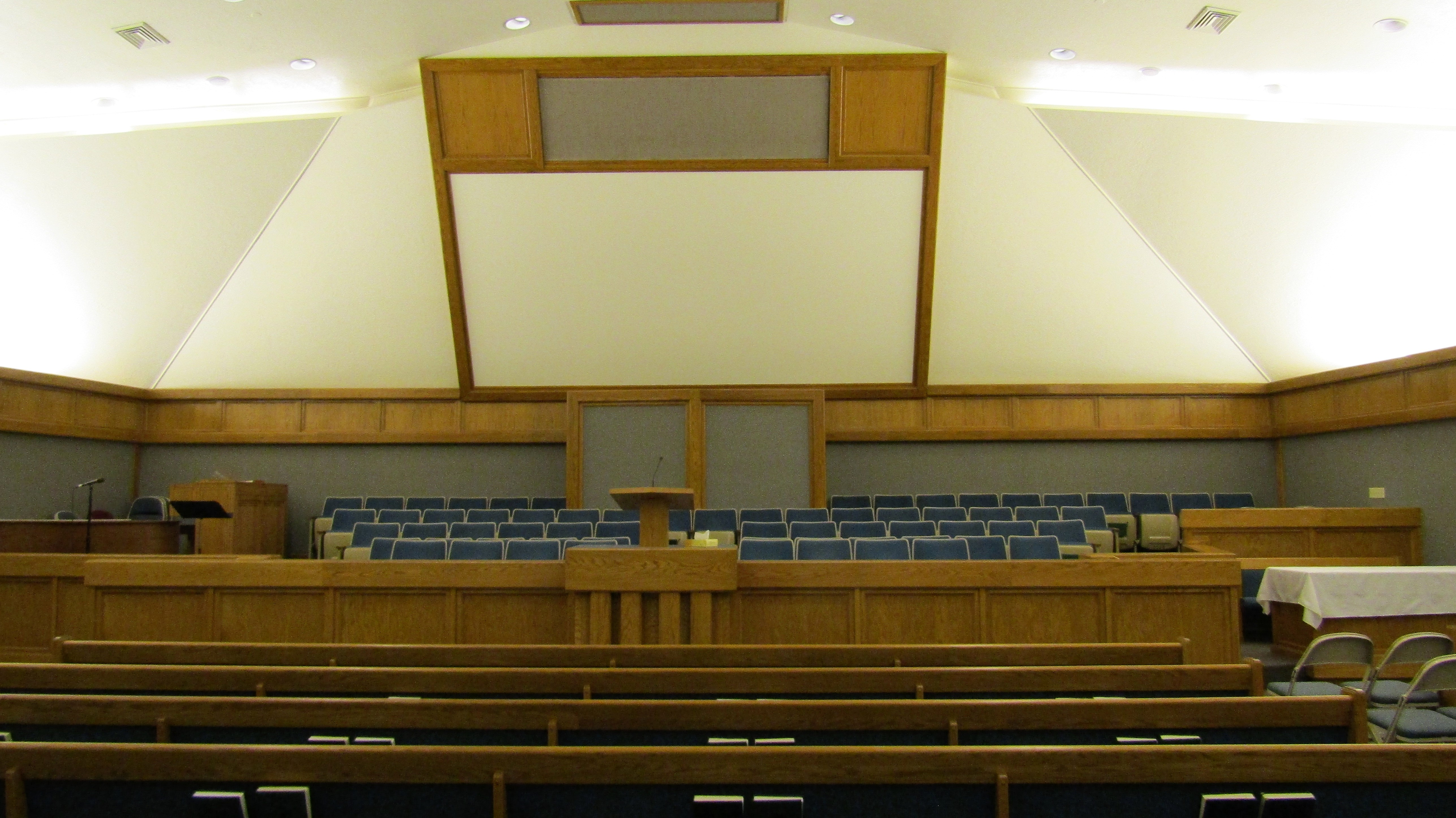
A chapel where LDS congregations meet

When the ward membership grows to a certain size, the ward will be divided. Generally, if both geographic divisions are in a reasonable distance of the meetinghouse, they will meet at the same building, but at different times. Most meetinghouses are designed to house multiple wards. Individuals can find out what ward they reside in by either talking to a local LDS leader or by using the meetinghouse locator tool on the church's webpage.

Unlike most religions, members are expected to attend the specific ward they reside in and are discouraged from choosing a different congregation that meets in a different place or at a more convenient time. There are some exceptions to this rule (see below), but for the most part members are discouraged from "shopping" for a different ward that is more convenient for them, or that they might attend with friends or relatives, or that has a more likeable leader.

==== Singles wards ====
Singles wards are set up in areas with high populations of single adults. Young single adult (YSA) wards are intended for single members ages 18 to 35, and single adult wards are generally for single members of ages 36 to 45. Older single adult members typically attend their family (standard) ward. These wards provide LDS singles the opportunity to serve in offices of the church. Members are taught the same principles of the gospel as a traditional ward, while receiving attention particular to their spiritual needs.

Singles wards are different in that they overlap several other regular wards geographically, even crossing stake boundaries. Single adult members may choose to attend the singles ward or their regular "home" ward; otherwise, the church strongly discourages the regular attendance of, and disallows the transfer of membership records to, regular wards other than the one to which the member's residence is assigned.

Since it is a doctrinal requirement that the bishop of a ward be married, this man will typically be called from another ward in the host stake of the singles ward. Men to fill the other positions, such as counselors in the bishopric, an executive secretary, and ward clerks, may also be called from other wards in the stake or from among the members of the singles ward.

A primary goal of a singles ward is to provide its members the chance to meet other singles of the opposite sex and eventually to be married. Singles in a certain area can then more easily find other singles of similar interests and beliefs, and eventually find a spouse. Groups are often formed to allow both the young single adults and single adults to conduct activities similar to those practiced in Family Home Evening. Although these groups may exist wherever there are LDS wards, they are more prominent in LDS singles wards.

LDS singles ward culture was portrayed and parodied in the 2002 movie The Singles Ward.

==== YSA wards ====
In 2011, YSA wards and stakes were reorganized and realigned to remove the distinction of a student ward from a traditional YSA ward. Previously, YSA wards were organized as either college/university wards or traditional YSA wards. At colleges and universities with large LDS populations, student wards were organized to serve the needs of students in attending these schools. In areas where there are large concentrations of YSA wards, YSA stakes are formed. Previously, when one or more wards were formed for the students of a college or university, separate wards would be formed for single and married students. In such university wards and stakes, the bishops and members of the stake presidency are filled by men called from adjacent stakes.

==== Language wards ====
Much like a singles ward, and with administrative approval, wards may be established in geographic areas which contain a high population of church members whose native language is different from the local language (such as adjacent to U.S. military bases in foreign countries, or in metropolitan areas which have larger numbers of immigrant/second-language users). Additionally, there are also wards for deaf members where the primary language used is the locally predominant sign language (such as American Sign Language in the U.S. and anglophone Canada). Services in these wards are conducted entirely in the target language. Colloquialisms such as "a Spanish ward" or "a Chinese ward", for example, refer solely to the language spoken, and not the race or ethnicity of the members welcome (e.g., there are no "Mexican wards"). However, in practice, different wards are sometimes made for different ethnic backgrounds or national origins, even though there is no difference in the language used. There used to be wards or missions that were designated based on race, such as Indian wards or Indian missions for Native Americans.

=== Branch ===
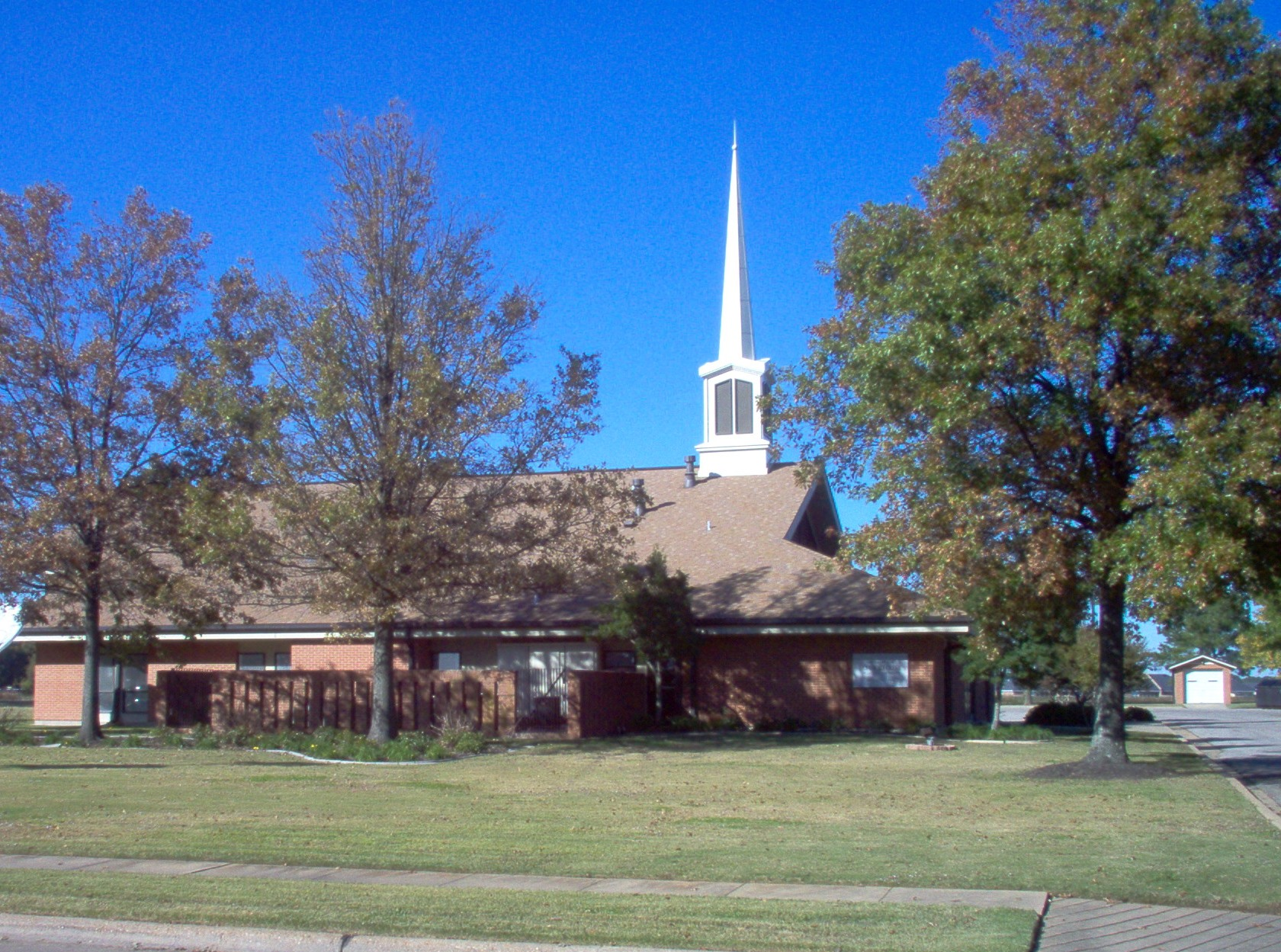
A meetinghouse for a branch in West Memphis, Arkansas

A congregation that is in a district or that has too small a membership to be a ward may be organized as a branch of the church. Branches may be organized in stakes, but wards may not be organized in districts. Branches in a district, or those where no stake or district exist, fall under the jurisdiction of the mission president.

Branches may also be formed for YSA, foreign-language, military personnel, retirees, or jail/prison/half-way house inmates where there is a need for special interests, but there are too few individuals to form a ward. As in the ward, the branch president in a YSA, or prison branch will typically be called from the stake or district in which the branch is organized, or those within close geographical proximity. Because of the nature of prison branches, all positions of authority will be called from outside of the branch.

Some branches (called "care center" branches) are set up in nursing homes with meetings held on-site for people who cannot travel to a meetinghouse. In these branches, leaders are also called from the local stake. Most branches require at least 20 members and require four Melchizedek priesthood holders capable of serving in leadership positions. YSA branches require 50 active members in addition to the above requirement.

=== Organization ===
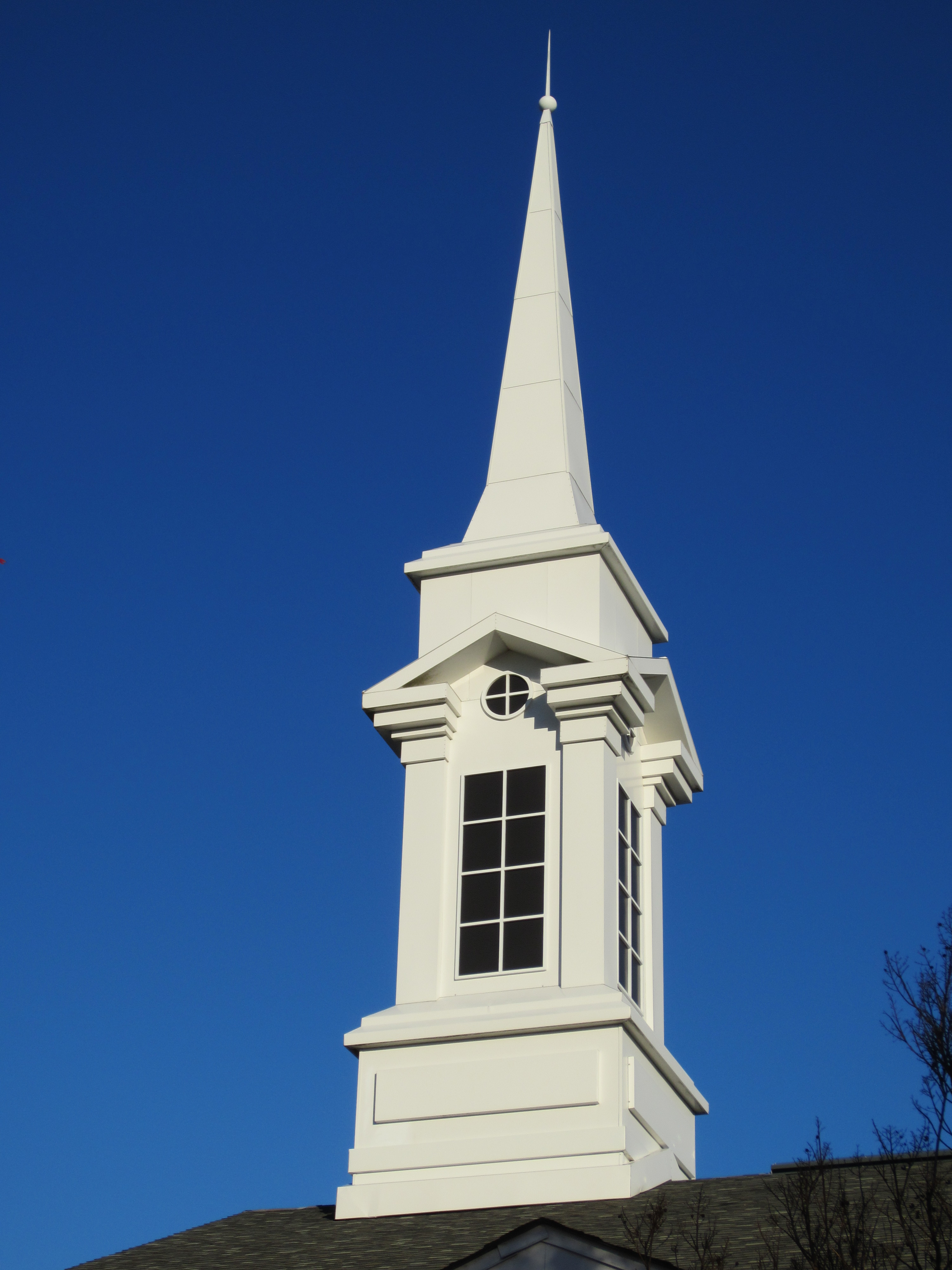
Many LDS Church buildings use steeples

The main organizations of a ward that are overseen directly by the bishop are the Relief Society (for women), the Young Men and Young Women, the Primary (for children), and the Sunday School. In branches, these organizations are filled when there are sufficient active members to fill these positions.

Those men ordained to the priesthood are organized into quorums by priesthood office. The offices of the lesser, or Aaronic, priesthood (typically males 11 to 18 years of age) are organized and overseen by the bishop (or branch president). Usually, there are separate quorums for deacons (11 and 12 year olds), teachers (13 and 14 year olds), and priests (15 years old and older). Offices of the higher, or Melchizedek, priesthood (including elders and high priests), within individual wards and branches are advised by, and counsel with, the bishop but are overseen by the stake president. Within districts, offices of the Melchizedek Priesthood within individual branches are advised by the branch president but overseen by the district president, under the direction of the mission president. Within a branch, priesthood quorums may be formed or all priesthood holders may meet together, as numbers permit.

The priesthood is central to, and directs the church and its organizations. Prior to adjustments made in April 2018, the bishopric, ward clerk, executive secretary, elders quorum president, high priest group leader, ward Young Men president, and ward mission leader would meet regularly as the Priesthood Executive Committee.

== Ward and branch conferences ==
Each ward and branch holds an annual ward or branch conference. In this meeting, ward organizational business is conducted, general and local leaders are sustained by a vote, and sermons are delivered by stake and ward leaders.

== See also ==
- Area (LDS Church)
- Latter Day Saint movement
- Parish
- The Church of Jesus Christ of Latter-day Saints membership statistics
