= Quorum (Latter Day Saints) =

Type of group in the Latter Day Saint movement

In the Latter Day Saint movement, a quorum is a group of people ordained or endowed with priesthood authority, and organized to act together as a body. The idea of a quorum was established by Joseph Smith early in the history of the movement, and during his lifetime it has included several church-wide quorums, including the First Presidency, the Presiding High Council, the Quorum of the Twelve Apostles, the Anointed Quorum, and the Quorum of the Seventy, as well as numerous local quorums for each congregation. The Council of Fifty, or General Council, was not part of the church, but a quorum-like body designed as a forerunner to establishing a theocratic government.

The concept of a quorum continues to have significant meaning in most modern Latter Day Saint denominations. Quorums are expected to act unanimously, if possible, and are chaired by one person who is designated as the president or presiding officer.

== Quorums in the Church of Jesus Christ of Latter-day Saints ==
In the Church of Jesus Christ of Latter-day Saints (LDS Church), a quorum is a body (group) of those ordained to the same office of the priesthood. The size of each quorum depends on the office to which the members are ordained.

=== General authority quorums ===
There are certain quorums that are called to preside over the entire church. These quorum members are called general authorities.

The presidency of the church (commonly called the First Presidency) is a quorum consisting of at least one apostle (the president of the church) and two or more high priests. In practice, all members of the First Presidency are usually apostles. The First Presidency presides over the entire church, although only church's president is authorized to use all priesthood keys within the church. The members of this quorum are usually the president of the church and his first and second counselors. The First Presidency may be expanded to allow for additional counselors, when needed.

The Quorum of the Twelve Apostles is a group of twelve men, ordained to the office of apostle, that have been called as "special witnesses of the name of Christ in all the world". This quorum is "equal in authority and power to the three presidents previously mentioned." Members of this quorum hold priesthood keys, but they are only used under the direction of the First Presidency.

The Presiding Bishopric is a council consisting of three men who are called to preside over the Aaronic priesthood and the temporal affairs of the church. This council consists of the Presiding Bishop and two counselors, who hold priesthood keys to direct the temporal affairs and finances of the church, in conjunction with the First Presidency and Twelve. They also hold all of the keys of the Aaronic priesthood. In current practice, these men are always high priests and ordained bishops.

The Quorums of the Seventy "are also called to preach the gospel, and to be especial witnesses unto the Gentiles and in all the world." These quorums are "equal in authority to that of the Twelve special witnesses or Apostles just named." Each Quorum of the Seventy may consist of up to seventy ordained to the office of Seventy. All the quorums of the seventy are presided over by seven presidents—the Presidency of the Seventy—who hold keys to direct the affairs of the quorums. There may be an unlimited number of such quorums that are called to witness in "all the world," but currently only the members of the first and second quorums are general authorities of the church. Six other seventy quorums are designated as authorities over specific areas of the church.

=== Local priesthood quorums ===
==== Melchizedek priesthood quorums ====
A high priests quorum is a local quorum organized in each stake and presided over by the stake presidency, who holds the keys of the Melchizedek priesthood within the stake. Along with the stake presidency, Melchizedek priesthood holders currently serving as a functioning patriarch, in a bishopric, or on the stake high council within the stake form this quorum. Full quorum meetings are held annually. (Historically, a high priests group was also organized in local units, presided over by a group leader and two assistants, with each group consisting of all high priests within that unit. On March 31, 2018, high priest groups were discontinued, with all local high priests not in the callings noted above becoming members of their unit's elders quorum.)

An elders quorum is a local quorum organized in each ward and presided over by a president with priesthood keys who, along with his two counselors, act under the direction and authority of the stake presidency, and under the direction of the bishop. Each quorum consists of up to 96 Melchizedek priesthood holders.

Historically, a local quorum of seventy existed which consisted of up to seventy members in each quorum, and was presided over by seven presidents, each of whom had keys and acted under the direction and authority of the stake president. In the LDS Church, quorums of seventy are no longer organized in local wards or stakes.

==== Aaronic priesthood quorums ====
A priests quorum is a quorum consisting of up to forty-eight Aaronic priesthood holders ordained to the office of priest. Young men are eligible to become a priest at the beginning of the year of their sixteenth birthday. If there are more than forty-eight priests in the ward, then the bishop may choose to divide the quorum. Priests quorums are organized at the ward level and presided over by the bishop. The bishop typically calls two "assistants" from the quorum to oversee the day-to-day affairs of the quorum.

A teachers quorum is a quorum consisting of up to twenty-four individuals ordained to the office of teacher. Young men are eligible to become a teacher at the beginning of the year of their fourteenth birthday. If there are more than twenty-four teachers in the ward, then the bishop may choose to divide the quorum. Teachers quorums are organized at the ward level and act under the direction of the bishop, who calls a teachers quorum president to hold keys to direct the work of the quorum.

A deacons quorum is a quorum consisting of up to twelve individuals ordained to the office of deacon. Young men are eligible to become a deacon at the beginning of the year of their twelfth birthday. If there are more than twelve deacons in the ward, then the bishop may choose to divide the quorum. Deacons quorums are organized at the ward level and act under the direction of the bishop, who calls a deacons quorum president to hold keys to direct the work of the quorum.

==== Administrative quorums ====
A stake presidency is a quorum consisting of three to administer a unit of church organization called a stake. This quorum consists of the stake president and two counselors who are each ordained to the office of high priest.

A stake high council is an administrative quorum consisting of twelve men called that assist in the administration of a stake. Each of the members is ordained to the office of high priest, and also belongs to the High Priests Quorum in the stake.

A bishopric is a quorum consisting of three to administer a church congregation or ward. This quorum consists of a bishop and two counselors. While a bishop and his counselors are typically high priests, counselors may hold other priesthood offices. Typically, the bishop is also set apart as the quorum president of the priests quorum, and he, together with two priests who serve as his assistants, form the presidency of the priests quorum.

A quorum presidency is an administrative quorum consisting of a quorum president who holds keys to direct the affairs of the quorum, and two counselors who he has selected to assist him. In most cases, the president will also select a secretary whom he will delegate authority to as needed.

Organization presidencies and groups such as the Relief Society, Primary, Sunday School, Young Men, and Young Women do not form quorums because they are considered auxiliary to the priesthood and its quorums.

== See also ==
- Stake and ward council meetings
