= Priesthood blessing =

A priesthood blessing in the Church of Jesus Christ of Latter-day Saints is a "prayer for healing, comfort or counsel given by a Melchizedek Priesthood holder, who lays his hands on the head of the person receiving the blessing." Priesthood blessings are considered to be non-saving ordinances by Latter-day Saints.

== See also ==
- Patriarchal blessing
