= Aaronic priesthood (Latter Day Saints) =

Order of priesthood in the Latter Day Saint movement

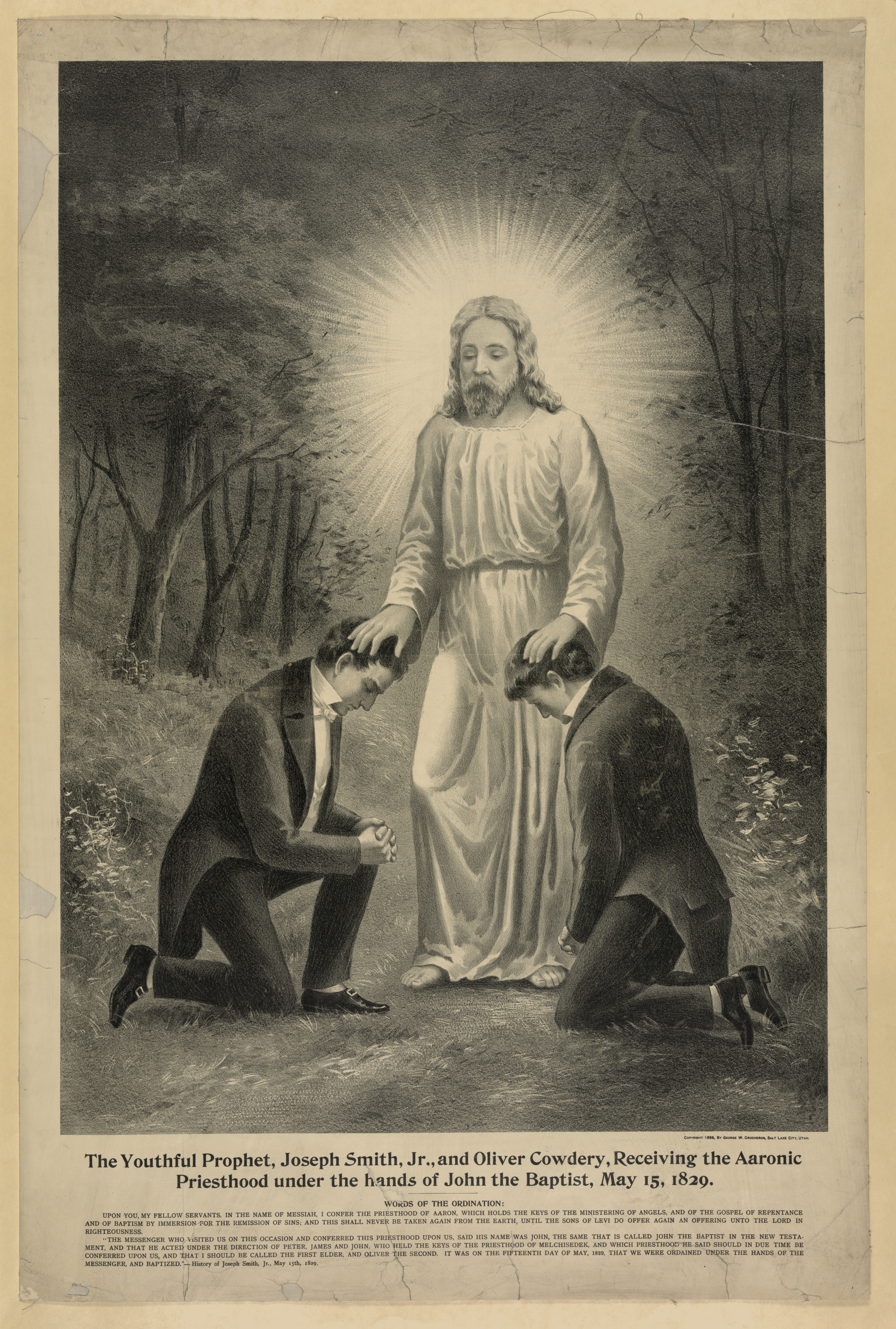
A 19th century depiction of John the Baptist conferring the Aaronic priesthood to Joseph Smith and Oliver Cowdery

The Aaronic priesthood (/ɛəˈrɒnɪk/; also called the priesthood of Aaron or the Levitical priesthood) is the lesser of the two orders of priesthood recognized in the Latter Day Saint movement, the higher being the Melchizedek priesthood. Unlike the Melchizedek priesthood, which is modeled after the authority of Jesus and the Twelve Apostles, the Aaronic priesthood is modeled after the priesthood of Aaron the Levite, the first High Priest of Israel, and his descendants. The Aaronic priesthood is thought to be a lesser or preparatory priesthood and an "appendage" of the more powerful Melchizedek priesthood.

In the Church of Jesus Christ of Latter-day Saints (LDS Church) today, holders of the Aaronic priesthood are primarily young men ages 11 to 18, and recent adult male converts to the church. The general leadership of the Aaronic priesthood, called the Presiding Bishopric, are administrative and financial agents of the church. (Note: ...concerned principally with church finances and administration.) Local leaders of the Aaronic priesthood are adult male bishops, who serve as pastoral leaders of individual congregations. Aaronic priesthood holders generally prepare, bless, and administer the sacrament, collect fast offerings, perform church and community service, assist in ministering, and occasionally perform baptisms. In their priesthood activities, holders of the Aaronic priesthood are also supported by the church's Young Men organization.

== History ==
Latter Day Saints believe that John the Baptist (himself of the Tribe of Levi) conferred the Aaronic priesthood directly upon Joseph Smith and Oliver Cowdery on May 15, 1829. Smith relates the conferral of the Aaronic priesthood in Joseph Smith–History as follows:

[W]e ... went into the woods to pray and inquire of the Lord respecting baptism for the remission of sins, that we found mentioned in the translation of the plates [Book of Mormon] .... While we were thus employed, praying and calling upon the Lord, a messenger from heaven descended in a cloud of light, and having laid his hands upon us, he ordained us, saying:

Upon you my fellow servants, in the name of Messiah, I confer the Priesthood of Aaron, which holds the keys of the ministering of angels, and of the gospel of repentance, and of baptism by immersion for the remission of sins; and this shall never be taken again from the earth until the sons of Levi do offer again an offering unto the Lord in righteousness.

He said this Aaronic Priesthood had not the power of laying on hands for the gift of the Holy Ghost, but that this should be conferred on us hereafter, and he commanded us to go and be baptized, and gave us directions that I should baptize Oliver Cowdery, and that afterward, he should baptize me.

Accordingly, we went and were baptized.

The messenger who visited us on this occasion and conferred this Priesthood upon us, said that his name was John, the same that is called John the Baptist in the New Testament, and that he acted under the direction of Peter, James and John, who held the keys of the Priesthood of Melchizedek, which Priesthood, he said, would in due time be conferred on us, and that I should be called the first Elder of the Church, and he (Oliver Cowdery) the second.

Immediately on our coming up out of the water after we had been baptized, we experienced great and glorious blessings from our Heavenly Father. No sooner had I baptized Oliver Cowdery, than the Holy Ghost fell upon him, and he stood up and prophesied many things which should shortly come to pass. And again, so soon as I had been baptized by him, I also had the spirit of prophecy, when, standing up, I prophesied concerning the rise of this Church, and many other things connected with the Church, and this generation of the children of men. We were filled with the Holy Ghost, and rejoiced in the God of our salvation."

=== Early days ===
From the start of the Church of Christ, the first members of the Aaronic priesthood were mostly adults. Early priests included Joseph Smith Sr. (59), Martin Harris (47), and two 30-year-old members: Hyrum Smith and Newel Knight. Teachers were Hezekiah Peck (49), Christian Whitmer (32), Hiram Page (30), and William Smith (20). Among the early deacons in the church were Titus Billings (38).

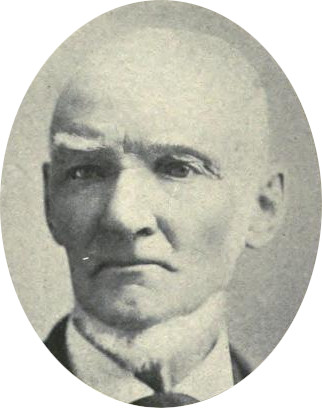
William F. Cahoon was one of the youngest men to receive the Aaronic Priesthood during Joseph Smith's lifetime.

There were some youth that were ordained to the Aaronic priesthood, including William F. Cahoon (17), Don Carlos Smith (14), and Erastus (15) and James Snow (17). In these early years, the holders of the priesthood had adult duties thrust upon them. For instance, in the Missouri Stake, the teachers quorum dealt with helping a brother quit tobacco, worked with a married couple in a dispute, settled neighborly disputes over cattle, and dealt with "lying and extortion." Adult deacons assisted priests and teachers in maintaining the houses of worship, seating people, making wine for the sacrament, and getting a license so that they could preach in homes. In 1833, plans for the Kirtland Temple included four rows of seating for the presidencies of the Aaronic priesthood; these clearly were intended for adults and not youth. In Nauvoo between 1839 and 1846, the average age of the priests was 29; however, there were four teenagers between 17 and 19. This practice with respect to age continued on in the Reorganized Church of Jesus Christ of Latter Day Saints.

=== 1849–77 in the LDS Church ===
After the succession crisis which followed Smith's death, between the years 1846 and 1877, changes started to occur as the members of the LDS Church moved west to Salt Lake City. Wards were created as the primary organizational unit of the church; however, the deacons, teachers, and priests were still stake-level positions. Adult men were still the major source for priests and teachers, as their duties entailed visiting ward members to check on spiritual well-being, settling disputes, collecting contributions, and helping those in need. Teachers occasionally would sit and judge in cases of wrongdoing, a job normally reserved for bishops. The church leadership would hold drives to ensure that positions were filled not as a need of the members to hold the priesthood, but as a need of the church to have the necessary males to accomplish the needed tasks.

By 1855, the Endowment House in Salt Lake City was completed and church leaders called for it to be busy in granting endowments to men and women. Each ward had quotas to fill in completing endowments, and the men that were sent to receive theirs were required to hold the Melchizedek priesthood. The average age of men who received the endowment at this time was 22; some were as young as 14. So many men were receiving the senior priesthood and their endowments that there were too few to fill the ranks of the junior priesthood. Brigham Young commented that perhaps men should receive the portion of the endowment pertaining to the Aaronic priesthood first before their missions. This would have allowed Aaronic priesthood holders to have served as missionaries; however, this idea was never implemented.

Melchizedek priesthood quorums also engaged in recruiting members from the Aaronic priesthood, which further depleted the ranks of the lesser priesthood. Unlike today, it was not a requirement to hold the Aaronic priesthood before receiving the Melchizedek priesthood, so the recruiting by the higher priesthood included the unordained as well. Presiding Bishop Edward Hunter and Brigham Young both lamented over the rush to ordain men to be high priests or seventies and the subsequent difficulty in keeping the Aaronic priesthood ranks filled. As examples, in 1857, Francis M. Lyman and Rudger Clawson were both ordained as elders at age 16; Clarence Merrill was ordained as a seventy at age 16.

In 1849, Young initiated an apprenticeship program whereby the holders of the Aaronic priesthood would take boys with them to teach them and give them experience. No age limits were specified. This helped to temporarily alleviate the problem arising from the dearth of Aaronic priesthood holders. By 1852, church leaders were instructing bishops to set apart members of the Melchizedek priesthood as "acting" teachers, priests, and deacons. Some bishops would ordain a few mature youth as teachers to accompany the "acting" teachers and learn the tasks. Whitney's successor, Edward Hunter, continued this practice of ordaining seventies and high priests as "acting" teachers, deacons, and priests. During the 19th century, home visits, which remained the paramount task of the Aaronic priesthood, entailed visiting from between eight and 20 families monthly, quarterly, or whenever possible. They also continued to be peacemakers and occasionally would judge wrongdoers. Hunter is quoted as saying, "The order of the church is to call in the labors of the teachers & if they cannot reconcile the parties it cannot be done."

Youth began to be ordained to the Aaronic priesthood and in 1854 one ward reported that "the principal portion of the young men had been ordained to the lesser priesthood." Possibly the youngest holders of the lesser priesthood were George J. Hunt, who was ordained a priest at age nine, and Solomon W. Harris, baptized and then ordained as a deacon at age eight. However, by the mid-1850s leaders were warning against ordaining unmarried men, and in the October 1856 general conference Young expressed disapproval regarding inexperienced "young men" being ordained:

When you have got your Bishop, he needs assistants, and he ordains Counsellors, Priests, Teachers, and Deacons, and calls them to help him; and he wishes men of his own heart and hand to do this. Says he, "I dare not even call a man to be a Deacon, to assist me in my calling, unless he has a family." It is not the business of an ignorant young man, of no experience in family matters, to inquire into the circumstances of families, and know the wants of every person. Some may want medicine and nourishment and be looked after, and it is not the business of boys to do this, but select a man who has got a family to be a Deacon.

The 1870s saw a reversal in the trend of less youth being ordained. Circumstances at the time dictated a change. First, the youth of the Salt Lake City, Provo, and St. George areas were misbehaving in ever-increasing numbers with ever-worsening acts. Some complaints from the era were as follows: "rowdyism is rampant"; "crowds of uncouth boys loitering around the stores halloing in the streets, and breaking horses on the Sabbath"; "uncouth and ill manners in refusing half the road on meeting teams"; "using pencils on walls and nails on the rails of the bannisters"; "strip[ping] of his clothes" (in reference to a mentally handicapped boy); "intoxicated and using the vilest language"; "a gang" spitting "tobacco juice on the floor". The church felt that it could help with such behavior, first by creating the auxiliary organizations for young women in 1869, young men in 1875, and Primary in 1878 for the younger children. This also led to a modest effort to recruit the young men into the Aaronic priesthood. Salt Lake Stake President Angus M. Cannon directed bishops "to draw the young men into positions in the Priesthood and thus an excellent experience, and, at the same time, preserve them from evil associations."

However, the lack of adult men willing to serve in Aaronic priesthood was ultimately the determining factor in the church ordaining youth. Young instructed Hunter in 1873 that each stake should have a full quorum of priests, teachers, and deacons; however, Hunter complained that he could not find willing men to fill these positions. One bishop noted, "It is a difficult task to find a sufficient quantity of efficient teachers. I have thought of calling upon some of the boys." Another stated, "It is very hard to get the older men to act as Teachers, but the young men come forward and are willing to take their parts and therefore we have to appoint young men where older ones should be." By the time of Young's death, he had taken the position that all boys needed some priesthood experience and that they should receive the Aaronic priesthood before reaching adulthood.

== Role within the LDS Church today ==
In the LDS Church today, the Aaronic priesthood has taken on a role as a source of training, leadership, and service for adolescent boys and new converts. It is often called a "preparatory priesthood." Holders of the Aaronic priesthood whom the church considers worthy are ordained to an office in the Melchizedek priesthood as a matter of course around the age of 18. Recently baptized men ages 18 and older are ordained elders after they have:

- Received the Aaronic Priesthood and served as priests.
- Developed sufficient understanding of the gospel.
- Demonstrated their worthiness.
- No specific time as a church member is required.

The Aaronic priesthood is open only to men and boys, twelve years old or older, who are considered worthy after a personal interview with their bishop. Requirements for worthiness include abstaining from all extra-marital sexual practices, following the Word of Wisdom, payment of tithes, and attending church services.

With the exception of bishop, the offices of the Aaronic priesthood are organized primarily by age, and an adolescent boy will be ordained to the next office if found worthy upon reaching the appropriate age. Active Aaronic priesthood holders seldom delay ordination to another priesthood office. The conferral and ordination to an office in the Aaronic priesthood is performed by the laying on of hands by a priest or by those holding the Melchizedek priesthood.

With the exception of bishop, Aaronic priesthood holders of the same office are organized into a quorum, each being led by a president and counselors. The president of the priests quorum is the bishop or branch president. Each ward has one or more quorums of each office of the priesthood if there are young men of the appropriate age group.

The church-wide titular head of the Aaronic priesthood is the Presiding Bishop. However, because the Aaronic priesthood is composed primarily of the youth of the church, the presidency of the Young Men organization supervises much of the church-wide organization involving the Aaronic priesthood.

=== Hierarchy ===
Holders of the Aaronic priesthood meet at the ward or branch where the priesthood holder lives. Young men who do not hold the office of the priesthood of the age group associated with each quorum are still invited and encouraged to attend with the quorum of their age group. However, priesthood duties can only be performed by those who are ordained.

Leadership calling (Note: A leadership calling includes the responsibility of holding the "keys" to preside over and direct a jurisdiction, ordinance, or activity of the work of the priesthood.)	Quorum (Note: Holders of the priesthood are also organized into quorums. The quorums are a brotherhood where members of the quorum assist each other, teach one another, and delegate particular responsibilities to individuals or committees.) or other organizational body	Office	Minimum requirements	Rights and responsibilities (Offices of the priesthood have all the rights and responsibilities of their lower levels.)
Bishop and counselors (Note: A president typically chooses two counselors whom he would like to serve with him (however on rare occasions there may be only one counselor or more than two counselors, the Quorum of the Twelve Apostles is presided over by a single president, and the Presidency of the Seventy consists of seven presidents equal in authority). Each of the counselors is given a precedence, for instance, "first counselor" and "second counselor". The counselors serve under the direction of the president and share in his responsibilities, and the president may assign each counselor to handle certain areas of responsibility. The president bears the sole burden of being the final arbiter of decisions, but he is encouraged to receive advice from his counselors and pay close attention to their opinions and insights. When the president is released, the counselors are also released. Usually, a secretary is also called by the president to serve, but he is not considered a part of the presidency.)	Bishopric	Bishop	Either a literal descendant of Aaron, or a high priest of the Melchizedek Priesthood; Male over the age of 18	See Bishop (Latter Day Saints)
Priests quorum president (Note: The bishop is usually the president of the priests quorum.) and assistants	Priests quorum (48 members max.)	Priest	Male in the January of his 16th year (Note: When a Latter-day Saint male is 18 or older, he is encouraged to become an elder of the church, which is an office of the Melchizedek priesthood yet still holds the authority of the Aaronic priesthood. However, before receiving the Melchizedek priesthood, an adult male must first receive the Aaronic priesthood; thus, men who convert to the Church as adults are usually ordained priests in the Aaronic priesthood shortly after their baptism and confirmation.)	Perform baptisms and give others the priesthood (to the same or lower office); Bless the sacrament
Teachers quorum president and counselors	Teachers quorum (24 members max.)	Teacher	Male in the January of his 14th year	Ministering; Prepare the sacrament
Deacons quorum president and counselors	Deacons quorum (12 members max.)	Deacon	Male in the January of his 12th year	Ministering of angels; Pass the sacrament and collect fast offerings

==== Teacher ====
In the LDS Church, the teacher is the second of four offices in the Aaronic priesthood. Male members of the church are eligible to be ordained teachers at the beginning of the year in which they turn 14 years of age. Approval by the bishop and an interview with him or one of his counselors is required before ordination. Prior to ordination, the proposed ordination must also be accepted by common consent by the members of the ward. With the approval of the bishop, a priest or a holder of the Melchizedek priesthood may ordain a person to the office of teacher by the laying on of hands.

As specified in the Doctrine and Covenants, a teachers quorum may not contain more than 24 members. As a result, in some larger wards there are two teacher quorums. A presidency, consisting of a president, first counselor, and second counselor, is called from members of the quorum by the bishopric and set apart to serve as the presidency of the teachers quorum. The president of the teachers quorum is given priesthood keys by the laying on of hands by the bishop to preside over the members of his quorum. A secretary to the presidency may also be called from the quorum membership. The members of the teachers quorum presidency and the secretary may not be set apart until after they have been accepted by the common consent of the members of the quorum.

The duties of a teacher are to assist the priests in taking care of the temporal needs of the church, and "to warn, expound, exhort, and teach, and invite all to come unto Christ". Teachers are permitted to assist in preparing the sacrament, usher during sacrament meeting, and perform all the duties of a deacon. Teachers are also typically paired with an adult male (often their father) to perform ministering.

An adult teachers quorum adviser may be called to assist the teachers. Sometimes an assistant adviser is also called.

After an interview with the bishop, teachers who are deemed worthy are ordained to the office of priest at the beginning of the year in which they turn 16 years of age, whereupon they will become members of the priests quorum.

==== Deacon ====
In the LDS Church, the deacon is the first of four offices of the Aaronic priesthood to which a male may be ordained. Male members of the church may become deacons at the beginning of the year in which they turn 12 years of age. A bishop may give approval for such members to receive the Aaronic priesthood and ordained to the office of deacon. Prior to ordination, the candidate must have an interview with the bishop or one of his counselors, and the proposed ordination must be accepted by common consent by the members of the ward. With the bishop's approval, a person who holds the office of priest or a holder of the Melchizedek priesthood is able to perform the ordination of a deacon by the laying on of hands.

Deacons in a ward are organized in quorums. The Doctrine and Covenants states that a president of a deacons quorum can preside over 12 deacons. As a result, in some large wards, there may be two or more quorums of deacons. From the members of each deacon's quorum, a president, first counselor, second counselor, and secretary may be called and set apart by the bishopric. The president and his two counselors constitute the deacon's quorum presidency. The president of the deacons quorum is given priesthood keys by the laying on of hands by the bishop to preside over the members of his quorum. The members of the deacons quorum presidency and the secretary may not be set apart until after they have been accepted by the common consent of the members of the quorum.

The duties of a deacon are to assist the teachers in taking care of the temporal needs of the church, and "to warn, expound, exhort, and teach, and invite all to come unto Christ". In modern practice, one of the deacons' primary duties is to pass the sacrament to the members of the congregation during sacrament meeting. Deacons also may receive fast offerings from the members of their ward on fast Sunday. A deacon may often sit beside the bishopric during sacrament meeting to act as a messenger or assistant to the bishop.

An adult advisor may be called to assist the deacon's quorum. Sometimes an assistant advisor is called.

== See also ==
- Priesthood (LDS Church)
- High priest (Latter Day Saints)
- Aaronic Priesthood Restoration Site

== Bibliography ==
- Hartley, William G. (Spring 1996). "From Men to Boys: LDS Aaronic Priesthood Offices, 1829–1996". Journal of Mormon History. 22 (1): 78–134. JSTOR 23287418.
- Hoiberg, Dale H., ed. (2010). "Aaronic Priesthood". Encyclopædia Britannica. Vol. 1: A-ak Bayes (15th ed.). Chicago, Illinois: Encyclopædia Britannica Inc. ISBN 978-0-85229-961-6.
- Ludlow, Daniel H, ed. (1992). Encyclopedia of Mormonism. New York: Macmillan Publishing. ISBN 0-02-879602-0. OCLC 24502140.
  - Ballantyne, Verdon W. (1992). "Aaronic Priesthood: Powers and Offices". Encyclopedia of Mormonism. pp. 1–3.
  - Bramble, Ronald L. (1992). "Deacon, Aaronic Priesthood". Encyclopedia of Mormonism. p. 361.
  - Brandt, Edward J. (1992). "Aaron, Brother of Moses". Encyclopedia of Mormonism. p. 1.
  - Christianson, Jack R. (1992). "Teacher, Aaronic Priesthood". Encyclopedia of Mormonism. p. 1441.
  - Hollist, W. Ladd (1992). "Priest, Aaronic Priesthood". Encyclopedia of Mormonism. pp. 1132–1133.
  - Pearson, Don M. (1992). "Bishop". Encyclopedia of Mormonism. pp. 117–118.
  - Porter, Larry C. (1992). "Aaronic Priesthood: Restoration". Encyclopedia of Mormonism. pp. 3–4.
