= Elder (Latter Day Saints) =

Priesthood office for men

Elder is a priesthood office in the Melchizedek priesthood of denominations within the Latter Day Saint movement, including The Church of Jesus Christ of Latter-day Saints (LDS Church).

== LDS Church ==
=== Office of the Melchizedek Priesthood ===
In the LDS Church, "elder" is considered the introductory—or lowest—of five offices of the Melchizedek priesthood. Every person who receives the Melchizedek priesthood is simultaneously ordained to the office of elder; this may be done to male members who are at least 18 years old. In order to be ordained, the member must be determined to be worthy by his local bishop and stake president. The consent of the priesthood holders of the stake is also required before the ordination is performed, and this is usually done at a semiannual stake conference or an annual general stake priesthood meeting. Ordination is accomplished by the laying on of hands and with the stake president's approval; it may be performed by any holder of the Melchizedek priesthood.

==== Responsibilities of an elder ====
According to the LDS Church's Doctrine and Covenants, the duty of an elder is to "teach, expound, exhort, baptize, and watch over the church." Elders have the authority to administer to and bless the sick and afflicted, to "confirm those who are baptized into the church, by the laying on of hands for the baptism of fire and the Holy Ghost", to baptize and give others the Aaronic or Melchizedek priesthoods as directed by priesthood leaders, and to take the lead in all meetings as guided by the Holy Spirit. An elder may ordain others to the priesthood offices of deacon, teacher, priest, or elder.

In practice, elders may be responsible for many of the day-to-day operations of a ward. They are called to serve in a variety of positions throughout the ward, such as Aaronic priesthood quorum advisors, ward mission leader, clerks, and Sunday School leadership. Elders and high priests (assisted by teachers and priests) are also responsible for ministering opportunities to serve the needs of assigned respective households in the ward.

==== Organizational structure ====
Elders are organized into quorums that may contain no more than 96 members. A quorum president, along with two counselors, is called and set apart under the direction of the stake presidency, and generally serves for a number of years. A secretary is also called to assist the president and his counselors.

All adult men in the ward who are not presently serving in the bishopric, the stake high council, or the stake presidency—or as a stake patriarch—are members of the elders quorum.

=== The title of "Elder" ===
The title "Elder" is not normally used as a personal title (e.g., Elder Evans, Elder Johnson), except by the LDS Church's general authorities, area seventies, and full-time male missionaries. Often, full-time male missionaries serving within a ward are referred to by the members as "the Elders" while female missionaries are referred to as "the sisters." After a mission has been served, the returning male missionary's title, "Elder", is replaced by the common usage of "Brother".
