= Priest (Latter Day Saints) =

Priest is a priesthood office in the Aaronic priesthood of denominations within the Latter Day Saint movement, including the Church of Jesus Christ of Latter-day Saints (LDS Church).

== Priests in the LDS Church ==
In the LDS Church, priest is the third of four offices of the Aaronic priesthood. Male members who turn 16 in the coming year are eligible to become ordained priests in January. An interview with and approval by the bishop is required before ordination. Prior to ordination, the proposed ordination must also be accepted by common consent by the members of the ward. With the approval of the bishop, a priest or a holder of the Melchizedek priesthood may ordain a person to the office of priest by the laying on of hands. All priests in a ward are members of a priests quorum. A priests quorum can have a maximum of 48 members.

The president of the priests quorum is the bishop, who holds the keys of the priesthood for this quorum. The bishop typically chooses a first and second assistant and a secretary from among the members of the quorum. These officers may not be set apart until after they have been accepted by the common consent of the members of the quorum.

According to the Doctrine and Covenants, the duty of a priest is to "preach, teach, expound, exhort, and baptize, and administer the sacrament". Accordingly, priests bless the sacrament and are permitted to perform baptism. They can also ordain deacons, teachers, and priests and confer the Aaronic priesthood upon others. A priest must receive the approval of the bishop prior to performing any of these actions. Usually, a priest will be paired with a man (often their father) as a ministering brother (formerly known as home teacher ). Priests also have all the duties and authority of a teacher and a deacon.

In 1908, Joseph F. Smith organized a committee to standardize and reform the Aaronic Priesthood quorums. This committee standardized the age requirements for young men to be ordained to the office of Teacher or Priest. Before that time there were not set ages for ordination.

A priest who turns 18 years old, or graduates from high school, depending on the situation, is integrated into the elders quorum. Those who are 18 years old and approved by the bishop and stake president may receive the Melchizedek priesthood and become an elder.

Priests usually spend much time preparing for future service as a missionary. All suitable young men in the church are asked to serve missions, with the option to do so at age 18 if they have graduated from high school.

== Priests in the Community of Christ ==
In the Community of Christ, a priest is an adult, who is a congregation-focused "Minister of Presence" in the Aaronic Priesthood. Their stated purpose is to "express their ministry of presence and model Jesus as Friend by being a spiritual friend to families, congregations, and community." Each congregation should have a designated bishop or stewardship commissioner who is responsible for Aaronic ministry in that congregation. A priest is to meet the needs of their congregation by following the annual Aaronic Ministry Plan in place for their specific congregation.

== Priest in the Church of Jesus Christ (Bickertonite) ==
The Church of Jesus Christ (Bickertonite) does not recognize priest as a specific office of the priesthood.
