= Melchizedek priesthood (Latter Day Saints) =

Greater of the two orders of priesthood in the Latter Day Saint movement

In the Latter Day Saint movement, the Melchizedek priesthood ( /mɛlˈkɪzɪdɛk/), also referred to as the high priesthood of the holy order of God or the Holy Priesthood, after the Order of the Son of God, is the greater of the two orders of priesthood, the other being the Aaronic priesthood.

According to Joseph Smith, the name of this priesthood became Melchizedek "because Melchizedek was such a great high priest" and "to avoid the too frequent repetition" of the "name of the Supreme Being".

== In the Church of Jesus Christ of Latter-day Saints ==
In the Church of Jesus Christ of Latter-day Saints (LDS Church), the largest Latter Day Saint denomination, priesthood holders meet at their ward or branch. Those who do not hold the priesthood are still invited and encouraged to attend with the elders quorum. However, priesthood duties can only be performed by those who are ordained.

Receiving the Melchizedek priesthood is considered to be a saving ordinance of the gospel in the LDS Church. A candidate for this ordination (worthy male member 18 years and older, regardless of how long they have been a member) is interviewed and often counseled to study the 84th, 107th, and 121st sections of the Doctrine and Covenants to begin to understand the oath and covenant of the priesthood, the covenant a person makes with God when he receives the Melchizedek priesthood. The candidate is also usually asked to stand in a gathering of the members of the church to be publicly accepted as being worthy of ordination.

Shortly after the establishment of the church, the ordination of black people to the priesthood was prohibited; following a revelation received by then-church president Spencer W. Kimball, the prohibition was lifted in 1978.

=== Hierarchy ===
Leadership calling (Note: A leadership calling includes the responsibility of holding the "keys" to preside over and direct a jurisdiction, ordinance, or activity of the work of the priesthood.)	Quorum (Note: Holders of the priesthood are also organized into quorums. The quorums are a brotherhood where members of the quorum assist each other, teach one another, and delegate particular responsibilities to individuals or committees.) or other organizational body	Office
President of the Church and counselors (Note: A president typically chooses two counselors whom he would like to serve with him (however on rare occasions there may be only one counselor or more than two counselors, the Quorum of the Twelve Apostles is presided over by a single president, and the Presidency of the Seventy consists of seven presidents equal in authority). Each of the counselors is given a precedence, for instance, "first counselor" and "second counselor". The counselors serve under the direction of the president and share in his responsibilities, and the president may assign each counselor to handle certain areas of responsibility. The president bears the sole burden of being the final arbiter of decisions, but he is encouraged to receive advice from his counselors and pay close attention to their opinions and insights. When the president is released, the counselors are also released. Usually, a secretary is also called by the president to serve, but he is not considered a part of the presidency.)	Quorum of the First Presidency	President: apostle (Note: The President of the Church is the senior (longest-serving) apostle.) Counselors: high priest
President of the Quorum of the Twelve Apostles	Quorum of the Twelve Apostles (Note: The Quorum of the Twelve Apostles may temporarily exceed 12 when the Quorum of the First Presidency is dissolved.)	Apostle (Note: The President of the Quorum of the Twelve Apostles is the second senior (longest-serving) among all the apostles, including the First Presidency.) (Note: If the President of the Twelve is serving in the First Presidency, or is unable to perform the duties due to health concerns, an acting president is called. This is typically the next most senior quorum member.)
Presidency of the Seventy	Quorums of the Seventy (Note: The senior president of the Seventy is assigned to preside over the other six presidents.)	Seventy (Note: The presidency of the Seventy must be from the first two Quorums of the Seventy.)
High priests quorum president and counselors ("stake presidency")	High priests quorum	High priest
Stake high councilors	Stake high council (12 members max.)	High priest
Elders quorum president and counselors	Elders quorum (96 members max.)	Elder
Other leadership callings:
Temple president and counselors	Temple	High priest
Mission president and counselors	Mission	President: high priest Counselors: elder
District president and counselors	District of a mission	Elder
Branch president and counselors	Branch of a district, mission, or stake	Elder

==== Offices ====
Office	Minimum requirements	Rights and responsibilities (Offices of the priesthood have all the rights and responsibilities of their lower levels.)
Apostle	Married in the temple; Male over the age of 18	Apostles receive the title "prophet, seer, and revelator", are considered "special witnesses" of Jesus Christ, and "hold all the keys necessary for governing the church".
Seventy	Male over the age of 18	Seventies are considered "especial witnesses" (Note: The word especial is used in Latter-day Saint scripture to describe how a Seventy differs from all other officers in the church.) of Jesus Christ, and work under the direction of the apostles. Members of the First and Second Quorums of Seventy also receive the sealing power which authorizes them to seal husbands to wives, and children to their parents, in any of the church's temples. Members of the other Quorums of the Seventy do not receive this as part of their calling.
Patriarch Not to be confused with Patriarchal priesthood.	Married in the temple; Male over the age of 55; Has received a patriarchal blessing	Patriarchs give what are called "patriarchal blessings" to Latter-day Saints. The patriarch is part of the high priests quorum; he is set apart for a particular stake but may also give patriarchal blessings to his own descendants, and in certain cases, to other church members.
High priest	Male over the age of 18	High priests are responsible for the administration of stakes.
Elder	Male over the age of 18	Elders may confer the gift of the Holy Ghost and give blessings by the laying on of hands. An important purpose of giving the Melchizedek priesthood to every adult Latter-day Saint man is to allow fathers and husbands to be able to give priesthood blessings of healing, comfort, counsel, and strength to their children and wife, and to preside over the family unit in a righteous manner.

== Restoration account debate ==
Joseph Smith and Oliver Cowdery said they were visited by "an angel of God... clothed with glory", who Cowdery and Smith identified as John the Baptist and who laid his hands on their head and gave them the Aaronic priesthood. Smith described the event in detail and gave an exact date when it happened as May 15, 1829. In contrast, he never gave a description of any vision in which he saw an angel separately confer the Melchizedek priesthood. However, by the turn of the 20th century, Latter Day Saint theologians believed that such a separate ordination by angels had occurred prior to the organization of the Church of Christ on April 6, 1830. This was largely because the early church organization contained the office of elder, which at least by 1835 was considered an office of the Melchizedek priesthood. As evidence for such a pre-organization angelic conferral, writers referred to a revelation in which Smith said he heard "The voice of Peter, James, and John in the wilderness between Harmony, Susquehanna county, and Colesville, Broome county, on the Susquehanna river, declaring themselves as possessing the keys of the kingdom, and of the dispensation of the fulness of times!" Smith and Cowdery were visited by the three angels in 1829 and that they conferred the Melchizedek priesthood in the same way John the Baptist had conferred the Aaronic priesthood. However, the official church history, supervised or written by Smith, states that "the authority of the Melchizedek priesthood was manifested and conferred for the first time upon several of the Elders" during a General Conference in early June 1831. When Smith's official history was first published in 1902, the compiler B.H. Roberts thought that this was a mistake, because it would not be consistent with the common Mormon belief that the priesthood had been conferred prior to the church's founding in 1830. In History of the Church, Roberts wrote, "there is no definite account of the [Melchizedek Priesthood restoration] event in the history of the Prophet Joseph, or, for matter of that, in any of our annals."

On the other hand, some Mormon historians accept Smith's history as correct and consistent with other historical records showing that other Mormons present at the conference dated the restoration of the Melchizedek priesthood to 1831. This conference had been a very significant event in the early church history, coming soon after the conversion of Sidney Rigdon, who believed that Mormon missionaries lacked the necessary power to adequately preach the gospel.

In January 1831, Smith issued a revelation where he wrote that after Mormons relocated to Kirtland, Ohio, they would "be endowed with power from on high" and "sent forth". In a revelation given to an individual, Smith assured the man that "at the conference meeting he [would] be ordained unto power from on high". One of Smith's associates that was present at the conference expressed the view that this ordination "consisted [of] the endowment--it being a new order--and bestowed authority", and later that year, an early convert who had left the church claimed that many of the Saints "have been ordained to the High Priesthood, or the order of Melchizedek; and profess to be endowed with the same power as the ancient apostles were". In 1835, the historical record was muddled a bit when the first edition of the Doctrine and Covenants altered pre-1831 revelations to make a distinction between the Aaronic and Melchizedek priesthoods, and to classify the offices of elder and apostle as part of the Melchizedek priesthood.
