= Organization (LDS Church) =

Part of a church government within The Church of Jesus Christ of Latter-day Saints

Within the Church of Jesus Christ of Latter-day Saints (LDS Church), an organization is a secondary body of church government that is "established for moral, educational, and benevolent purposes." Prior to October 2019, the church's organizations were called auxiliary organizations. As the term suggested, the LDS Church's organizations are ancillary to the governing power of the priesthood in the church. The LDS Church's five organizations are Primary, Relief Society, Sunday School, Young Men, and Young Women.

The existence of the LDS Church's organizations as a means of assisting the priesthood is based on the Apostle Paul's statement that God has established "helps" and "governments" in the church to assist the apostles and prophets who lead the church. Apostle Harold B. Lee taught that "an auxiliary is to be an aid to the priesthood in watching over the Church and also an aid to the home, under the direction and ... cooperation [of] the priesthood." The purpose of the organizations is to help "plant and make grow ... a testimony of Christ and of the Gospel."

According to Joseph F. Smith, the church's organizations are temporary and may be created or discontinued as the needs of the church and the priesthood hierarchy change. While serving as the church's president, Smith further stated:

We expect to see the day, if we live long enough ... when every council of the Priesthood in the Church of Jesus Christ of Latter-day Saints will understand its duty; will assume its own responsibility, will magnify its calling, and fill its place in the Church, to the uttermost, according to the intelligence and ability possessed by it. When that day shall come, there will not be so much necessity for work that is now being done by the auxiliary organizations, because it will be done by the regular quorums of the Priesthood.

In the LDS Church today, each organization is headed by a church-wide "general president" and two counselors; the three individuals together form the organization's "general presidency." These individuals are not church general authorities, but are referred to as "general officers." Like general authorities, these officers are "accepted and sustained" by the church members as leaders in their respective areas of stewardship, which are set out by the First Presidency and the Quorum of the Twelve Apostles.

Prior to October 2019, each of the organizations existed at a local ward and stake level, with presidencies formed to direct the work of the organization in that particular region, except for the stake Sunday School organization. A member of the stake high council serves as the stake Sunday School president and may serve with or without counselors and/or a secretary. A similar structure exists for the stake Young Men organizations. The church announced in October 2019 that the presidency of the Young Men at the ward level was being discontinued.

Leaders of organizations at the ward and stake levels are called "ward officers" and "stake officers," respectively. Local organization presidencies work under the direction of the local priesthood leaders, which in most cases are the bishop and the stake president.

== See also ==
- List of general officers of The Church of Jesus Christ of Latter-day Saints
- Genesis Group
