= Deacon (Latter Day Saints) =

One of the offices in the Aaronic Priesthood

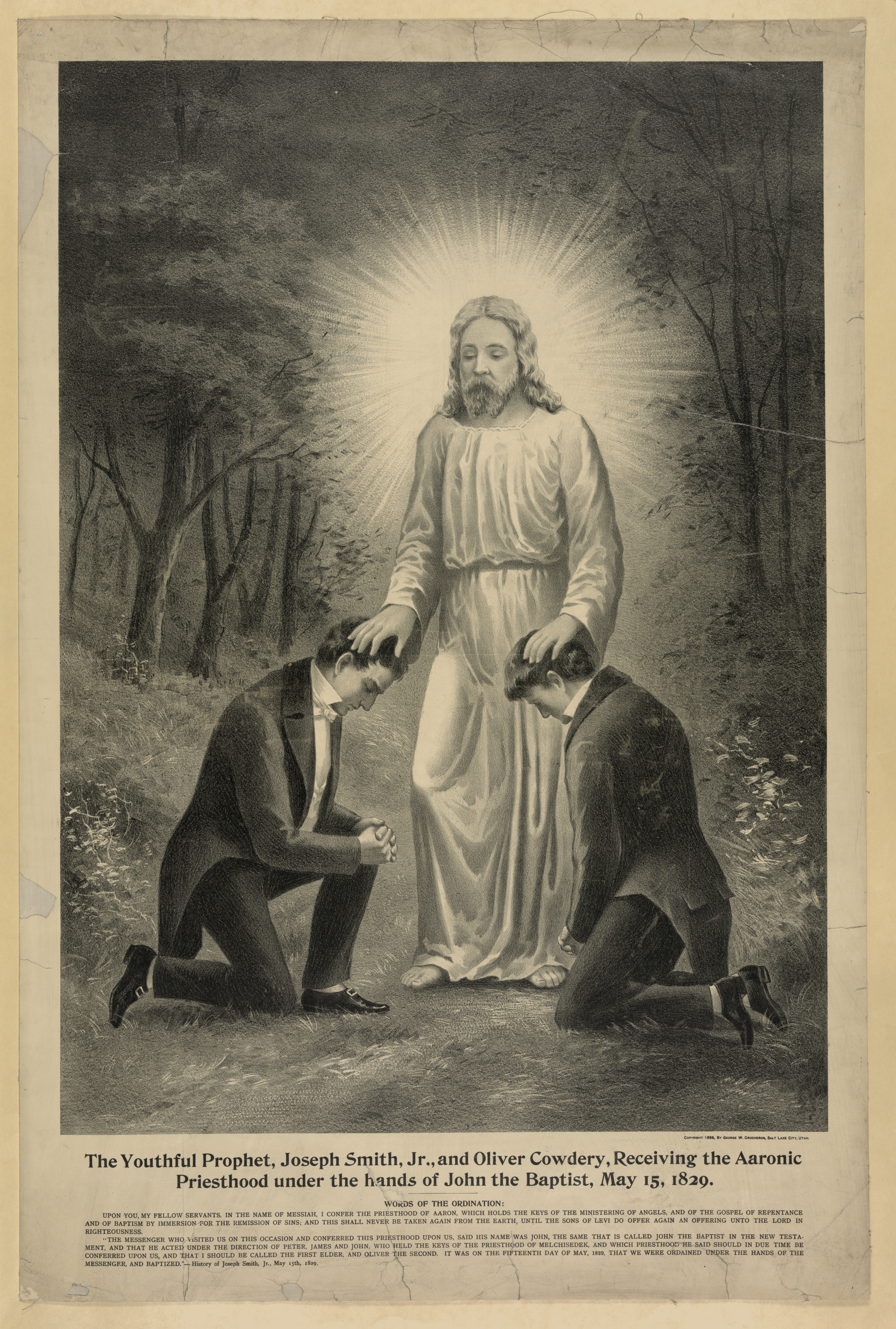
19th-century illustration depicting John the Baptist conferring the Aaronic Priesthood on Joseph Smith and Oliver Cowdery in May 1829. According to Mormon doctrine, this event marked the beginning of the Restoration of the Priesthood. The office of deacon belongs to this restored priesthood, which began with this momentous occasion in Latter-day Saint history

A deacon in The Church of Jesus Christ of Latter-day Saints is one of the offices in the Aaronic Priesthood, the lowest in the Mormon priesthood hierarchy. In the modern church, a boy who has been baptized, confirmed, and found worthy may be ordained as a deacon at the age of 11 or 12. Deacons are given various responsibilities, including distributing the sacrament to the congregation.

Boys ordained as deacons belong to small priesthood quorums. Theologically based in the Doctrine and Covenants, the office of deacon developed in the early days of Mormonism, achieving its current form and structure in the early 20th century. The office of deacon also appears in other denominations within the Latter-day Saint movement.

== Deacons in the practice and theology of The Church of Jesus Christ of Latter-day Saints ==
A boy who is baptized, confirmed, and deemed worthy can be ordained as a deacon at the age of 12. Occasionally, an eleven-year-old may receive the deaconate. In such cases, ordination can take place in January of the year in which the candidate turns twelve. This adjustment is consistent with a circular from the First Presidency issued in December 2018, which took effect in January 2019.

Deacons are assigned various tasks, including distributing the sacrament among the congregation, assisting the elderly and disabled, maintaining order in church buildings, and (in some cases) collecting fast offerings. Deacons may also serve as messengers for priesthood leaders. In line with the hierarchical nature of the Mormon priesthood, any task assigned to a deacon may also be performed by a teacher or a priest.

Deacons usually serve for 2 years, after which, if still deemed worthy, they assume the role of teacher. They are organized into quorums of up to 12 members, each having its own presidency and secretary, appointed by the bishop, at least where possible. The presidency members and secretary must be ordained deacons. When the number of members in a quorum exceeds a certain threshold, it may be divided. The creation of a new quorum of deacons within a ward falls under the bishop's authority, who is required to consider the impact of such a division on the formation of young priests.

Bruce R. McConkie, a member of the Quorum of the Twelve Apostles and an expert on Mormon doctrine, noted that the office of deacon, though the lowest in the church’s priesthood hierarchy, is nonetheless a sacred and important office in the Kingdom of God. He explained the current role of deacons by referencing modern pastoral needs, as well as the church's established tradition. He nonetheless gave these primarily administrative factors a significant theological foundation, viewing them as confirmed by the inspiration of the Holy Spirit through those who hold the keys of the priesthood.

McConkie further noted that during the dispensation corresponding to the meridian of time, a period close to the life and earthly ministry of Christ, adults were ordained as deacons. Since women do not hold the priesthood, and thus the office of deaconess does not exist in the church, McConkie regarded the ordination of deaconesses in other churches as evidence of the great apostasy.

The right to ordain deacons belongs to any elder and priest acting under the authority and direction of the bishop or branch president. If a boy’s father is a member of the church, he can, and generally should, ordain his son. A deacon ordained in this way must be sustained by the members of his ward or branch. The bishopric or branch presidency assigns an adult advisor to the deacons, whose role is to teach, provide training, help them follow Jesus Christ, prepare them for ordination in the Melchizedek priesthood, and eventually prepare them for missionary service. In wards, the second counselor in the bishopric is typically appointed as this advisor.

The office of deacon, like other elements of the church's organizational structure, is rooted in the Mormon canon, specifically in the Doctrine and Covenants. Chapter 20 of this book states that deacons are to warn, explain, exhort, and teach, as well as invite all to come to Christ. They are also instructed to assist teachers in performing their duties.

Due to the unique, abstract nature of the Mormon priesthood, it is theoretically possible for a member to be ordained in the Aaronic Priesthood without being assigned to any specific office within that priesthood, including the office of deacon. However, such a scenario would be inconceivable in the modern church, and there are no known cases where it has been implemented.

An important part of the lives of deacons, at least in the United States and Canada, was involvement in the Scout Movement. After the church officially ended its association with scouting organizations in 2019, it launched its own program for children and youth with similar functions and goals.

== History, evolution, and future of the office of deacon ==
The deaconate emerged in the earliest stages of Mormonism. It was introduced by Joseph Smith at least by the church conference held on 9 June 1830. Some deacons may have been ordained during the church's organizational meeting (6 April 1830), though sources do not provide clear information on this matter. It has been noted that, chronologically speaking, the deaconate predates the formal establishment of the Aaronic Priesthood, to which it doctrinally belongs.

The earliest known record of deacons being ordained dates from 25 October 1831, when Titus Billings, among others, was ordained a deacon. Initially, this office, along with other offices in the Aaronic Priesthood, was reserved for adult men (until 1846). In the following decades, there were various efforts to find the appropriate place and form for the deaconate within the still-developing Mormon priesthood. Since the Melchizedek priesthood confers authority to perform all tasks associated with the Aaronic Priesthood, the practice of ordaining men with the Melchizedek priesthood to offices in the Aaronic Priesthood, including the deaconate, became widespread. During the presidency of Brigham Young (1847–1877), much of the deacon's work in Utah was handled this way. In this period, temporary deacons also existed, who could simultaneously serve as temporary teachers or priests.

A circular from the First Presidency dated 11 July 1877 opened the door for teenage boys to be ordained as deacons. Although this practice gained relatively quick acceptance, it was still far from universal in the 1890s. The modern form of the deaconate, including its specific age range and clearly defined responsibilities, is the result of a priesthood reform movement that took place between 1908 and 1922.

A minor adjustment regarding the age of boys being ordained as deacons was made in 1954. It is anticipated that the international expansion of the church, generational shifts, and changing social expectations will necessitate further restructuring of the Aaronic Priesthood in the future, including the office of deacon.

== In other denominations of the Latter-day Saint movement ==
As an integral part of Mormonism's history, the office of deacon appears in various religious organizations that trace their origins back to Joseph Smith. It was part of the priesthood hierarchy in the Church of Christ, a short-lived community founded in 1848 by James C. Brewster and Hazen Aldrich. It also belongs to the Aaronic Priesthood in the Community of Christ, known until 2001 as the Reorganized Church of Jesus Christ of Latter Day Saints. The office also appeared in one of the groups that split from the latter church, specifically in a community known as the Church of the Christian Brotherhood. This group was founded in Toronto, Canada, by Richard C. Evans in 1918 and was formally dissolved in 1966.

The office of deacon is also present in denominations with relatively short histories. It exists in the Restored Branch of Jesus Christ, a Mormon denomination with roots in the United Kingdom, founded in 2006 by Matthew Philip Gill. It also appears in a group founded in 2015 called the Church of Jesus Christ in Christian Fellowship. This group was established in Columbus, Ohio, and is led by David Ferriman.

== Bibliography ==
- Hartley, William (1973). "The Priesthood Reform Movement, 1908-1922". Brigham Young University Studies Quarterly. 13 (2). Brigham Young University. ISSN 2167-8472.
- Hartley, William (1996). "From Men to Boys: LDS Aaronic Priesthood Offices, 1829-1996". Journal of Mormon History. 22 (1). University of Illinois.
- Ludlow, Daniel H., ed. (1992). Encyclopedia of Mormonism. New York: Macmillan Publishing. ISBN 978-0-02-904040-9.
- Shields, Steven L. (2021). Divergent Paths of the Restoration: An Encyclopedia of the Smith–Rigdon Movement. Salt Lake City: Signature Books. ISBN 978-1-56085-401-2.
- Terry, Roger (2018). "Authority and Priesthood in the LDS Church, Part 1: Definitions and Development" (PDF). Dialogue: A Journal of Mormon Thought. 51 (1). Dialogue Foundation: 1–38. doi:10.5406/dialjmormthou.51.1.0001. ISSN 1554-9399.
