= Meetinghouse (LDS Church) =

Place of worship for the LDS Church

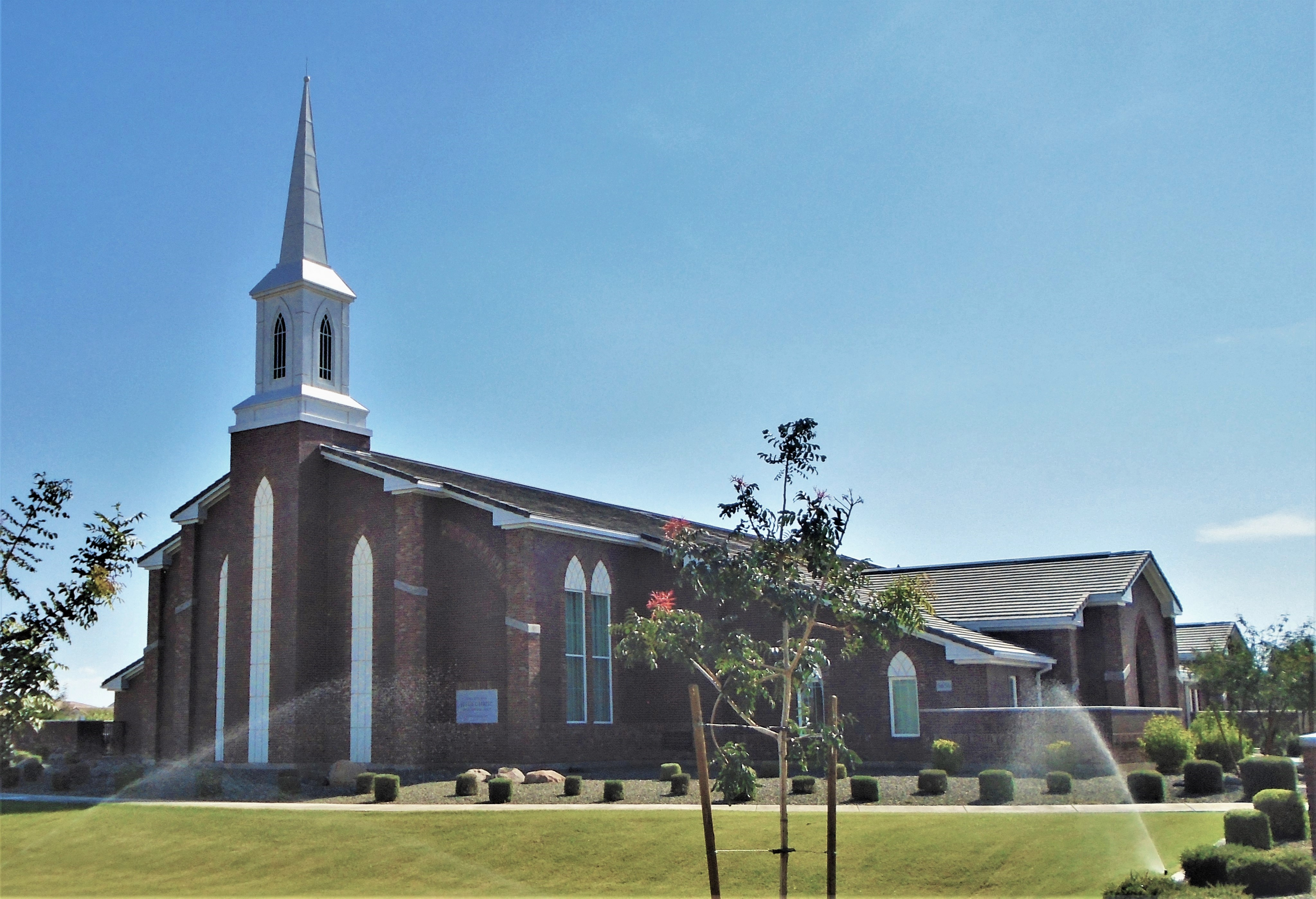
A Meetinghouse in Queen Creek, Arizona

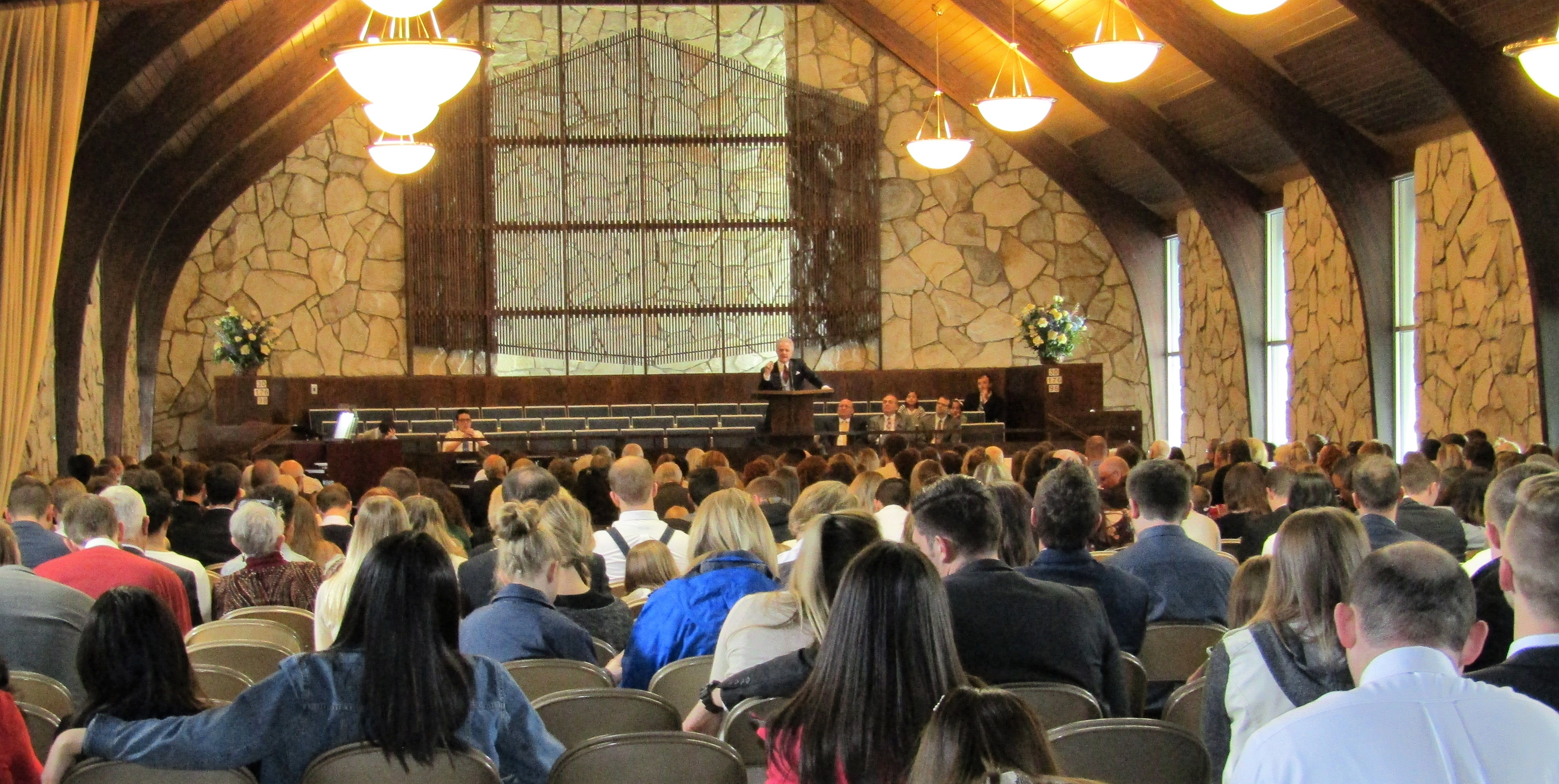
Worship at a meetinghouse in Provo, Utah

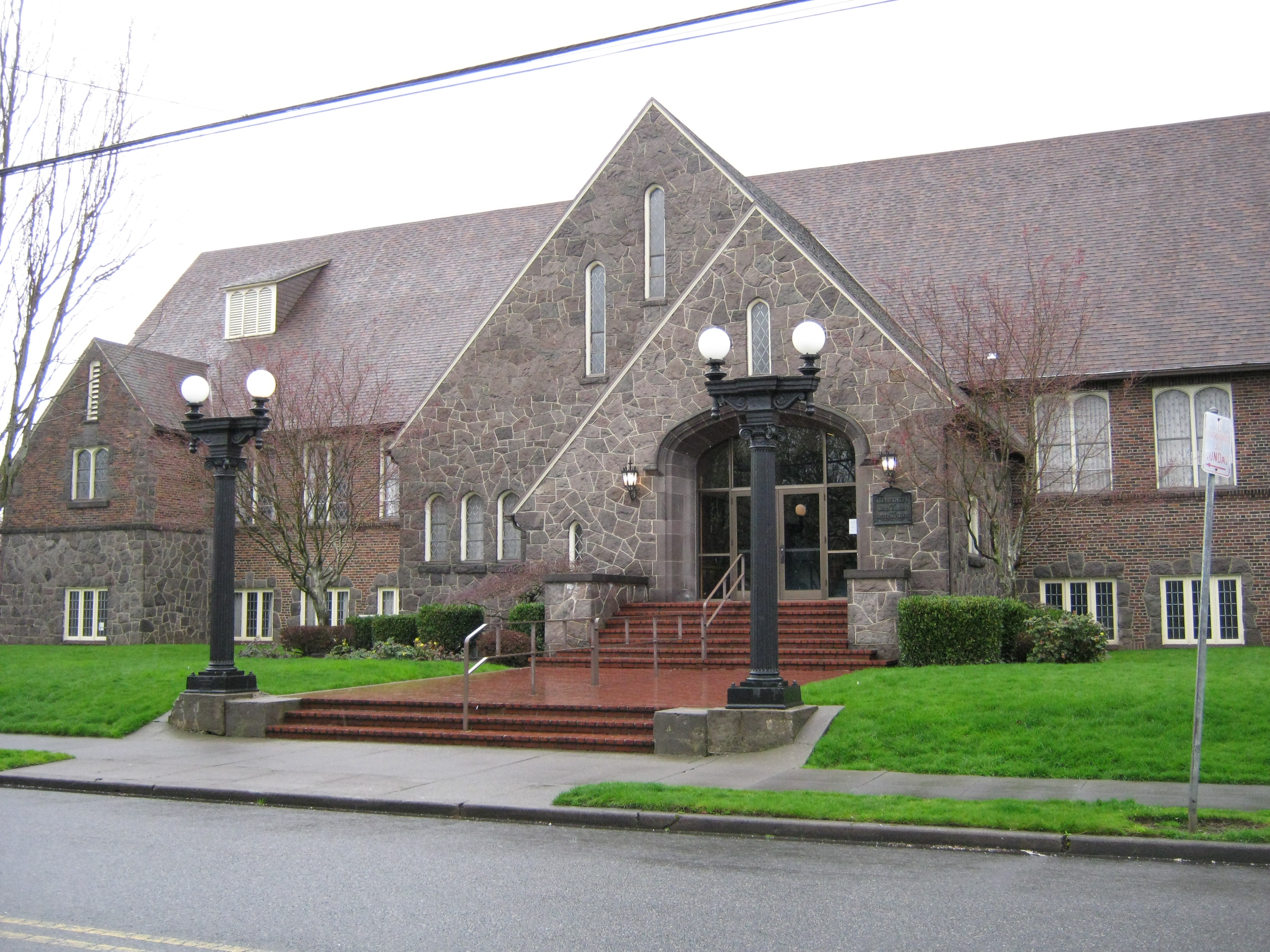
An early 20th-century meetinghouse in Portland, Oregon

A meetinghouse is a place of worship for members of the Church of Jesus Christ of Latter-day Saints (LDS Church).

Latter-day Saints use meetinghouses for most of their worship and Sunday school instruction. They differ from temples, which are used for specific rites by faithful members. Unlike temples, meetinghouses are open to the public and often host community events.

== Design and function ==
Meetinghouses of the LDS Church are built to be practical. Most meetinghouses contain a chapel, classrooms, one or more foyer(s) for mingling, a kitchen, offices for bishops and clerks, and a "cultural hall" (gymnasium). Some meetinghouses double as a "stake center". These are typically a bit larger than standard meetinghouses and also contain stake offices, a baptismal font, and often a FamilySearch Center.

Most contemporary meetinghouses contain the chapel and cultural hall in the center of the building with the rest of the rooms around the outside.

Many meetinghouses have an attached softball field and/or picnic shelter.

== Uses ==
=== Worship services ===
The most notable use for meetinghouses is the weekly worship service known as sacrament meeting. Every Sunday, members of the LDS Church meet to partake of the sacrament (equivalent to eucharist or communion in other Christian services), listen to sermons by members of the congregation, sing congregational hymns, and hear announcements for upcoming events. Once a month, on a fast Sunday, members have the opportunity to share their testimonies (statement of belief) instead of hearing prepared sermons.

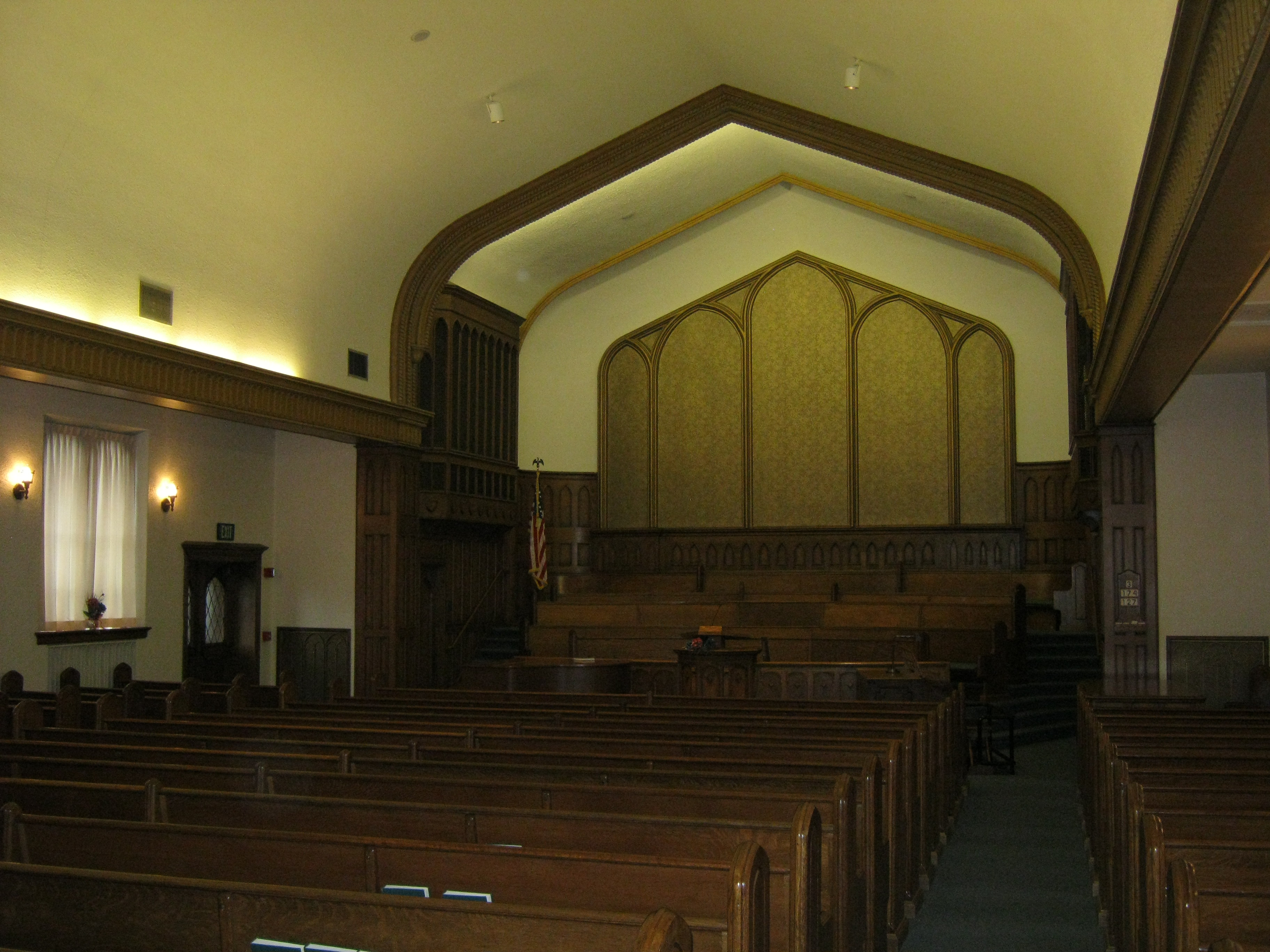
The chapel of a Meetinghouse in Portland, Oregon

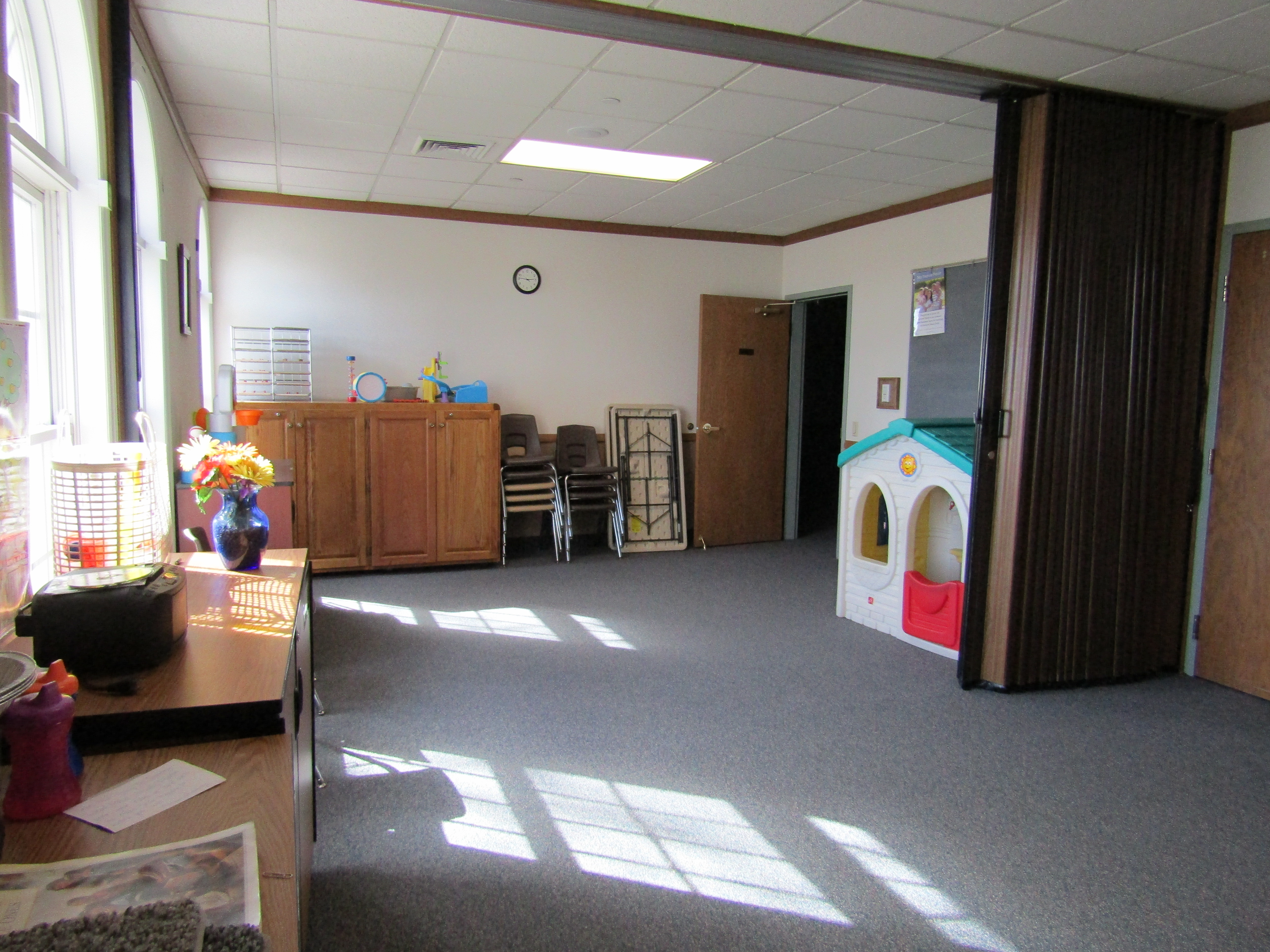
The nursery room in a meetinghouse in Provo, Utah

=== Classes ===
Latter-day Saints use meetinghouses for their weekly Sunday School and either priesthood quorum or organizational classes, held either immediately before or after sacrament meeting. These classes alternate between each week between Sunday School and elders quorum/Relief Society/Young Men/Young Women (depending on age and gender). Children go to either Primary or Nursery, depending on age.

=== Wedding receptions and funerals ===
While church members generally get sealed (married) in the temple, these sealings may be accompanied by a wedding reception or a public wedding ceremony. Reasons for this may be to invite non-members to the wedding (as non-members are not permitted in the temple), or because the other partner is not a member. Members are permitted to use the meetinghouses for either receptions or ceremonies as long as they do not fall on a Sunday, and another church activity is not already scheduled in the areas that will be used.

Similarly, buildings may be used for funeral services as well.

=== Ward and stake events ===
Various events for individual wards and stakes may be held in the meetinghouse, typically in the Cultural Hall or attached field. These events can include meals, plays, and sports.

== Maintenance and cleaning ==
Since the early 2000s, church members have been tasked with cleaning the meetinghouses. Families or individuals are assigned to clean the meetinghouse one to a few times a year (depending on the number of congregations and members), with the church being cleaned once a week. In some countries, professional custodians are still hired to maintain the meetinghouse. Generally, a church member is assigned the coordination of maintenance responsibilities and supervision of the cleaning. For larger or more complicated projects, these facilities coordinators can contact the church's facilities department.

== Gallery ==
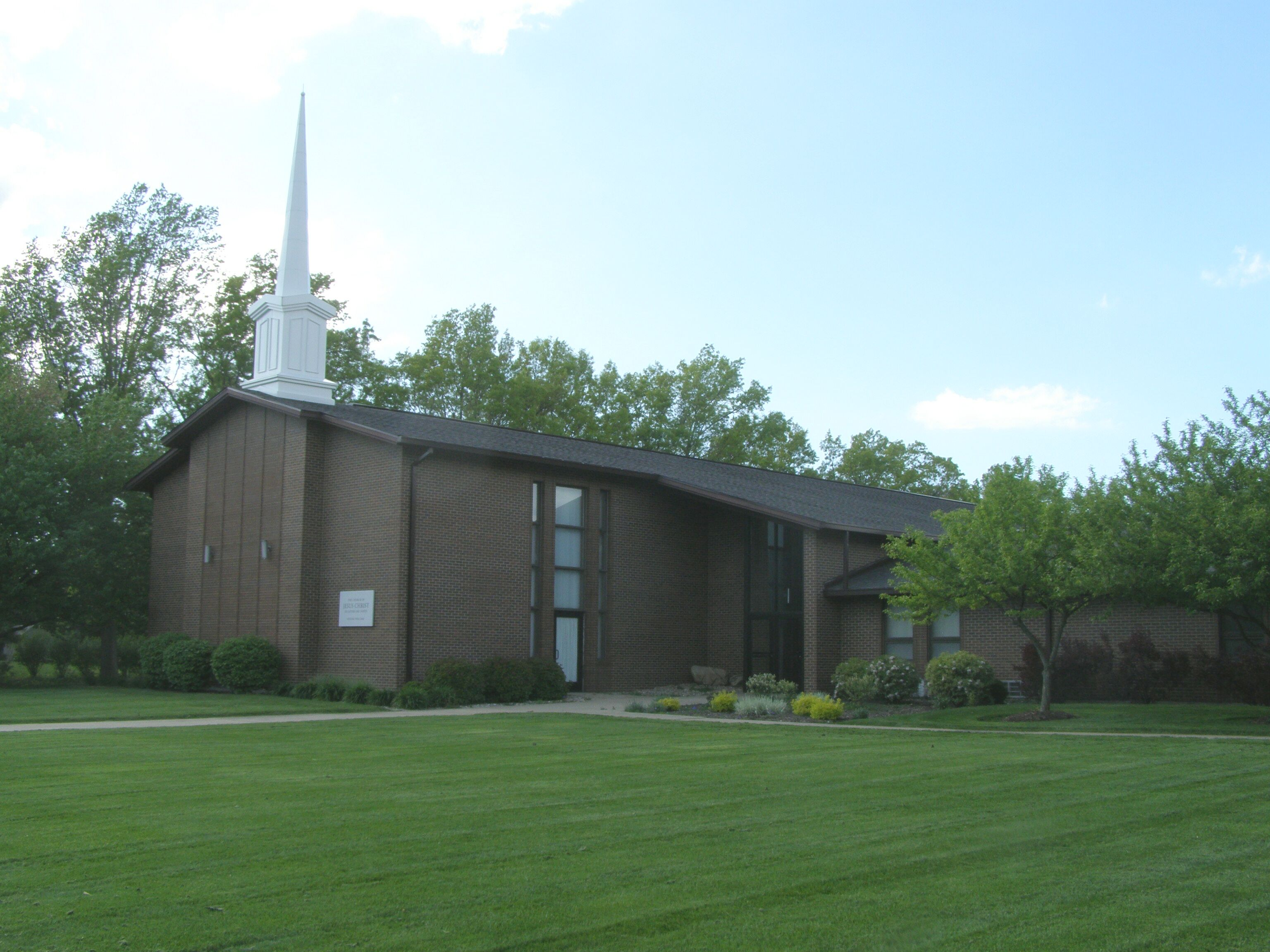
Valparaiso, Indiana

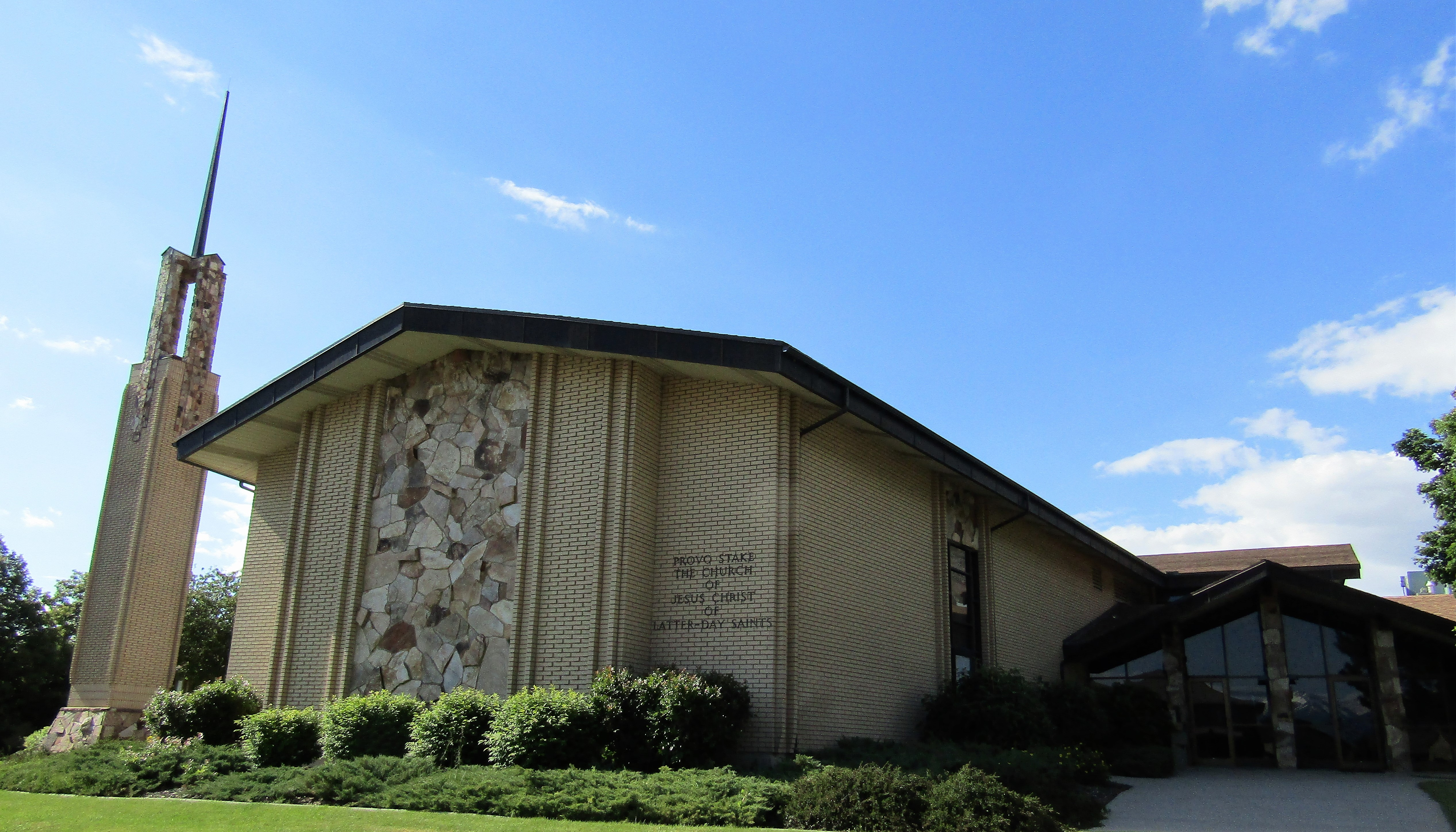
Provo, Utah

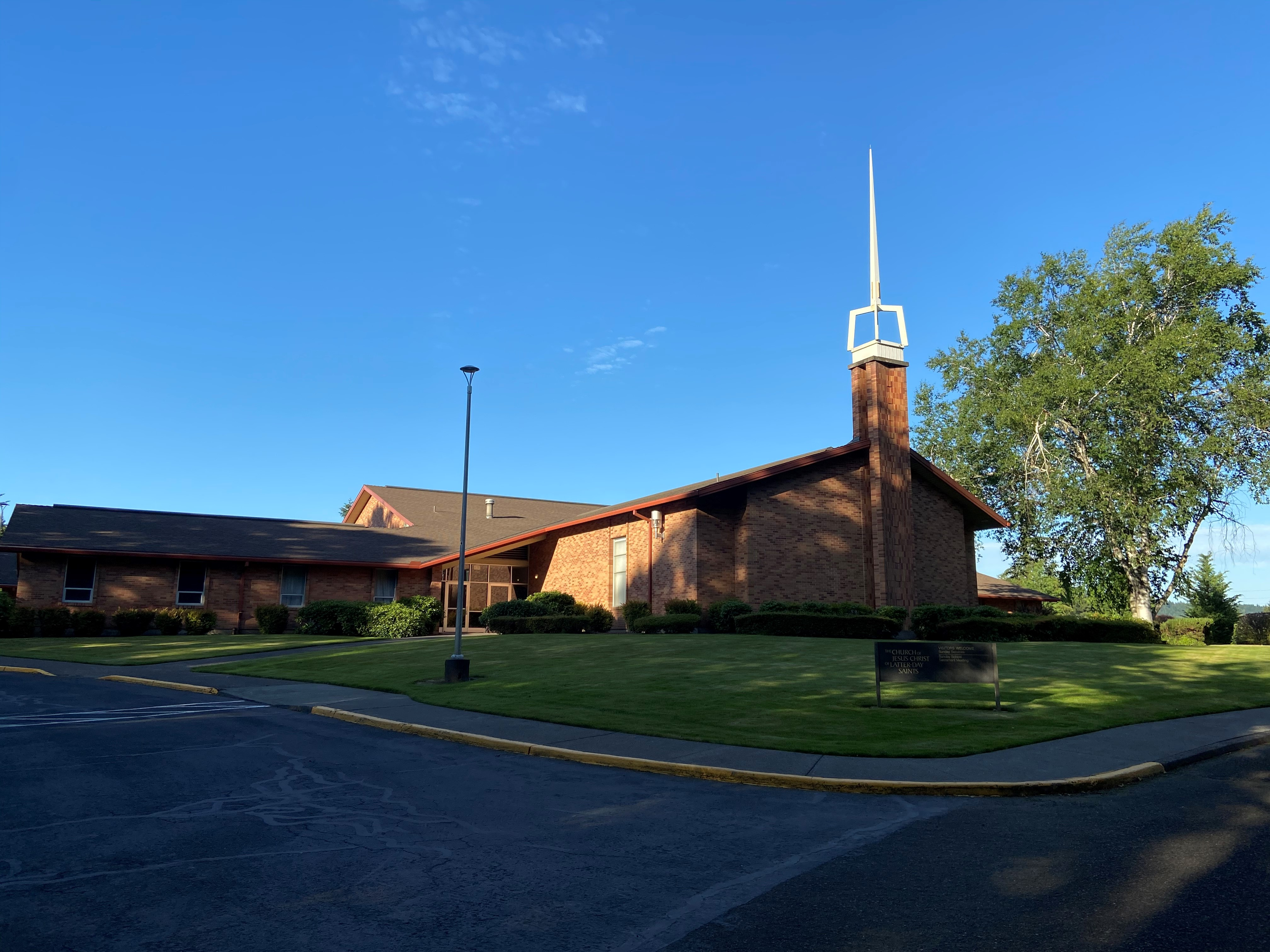
Milwaukie, Oregon

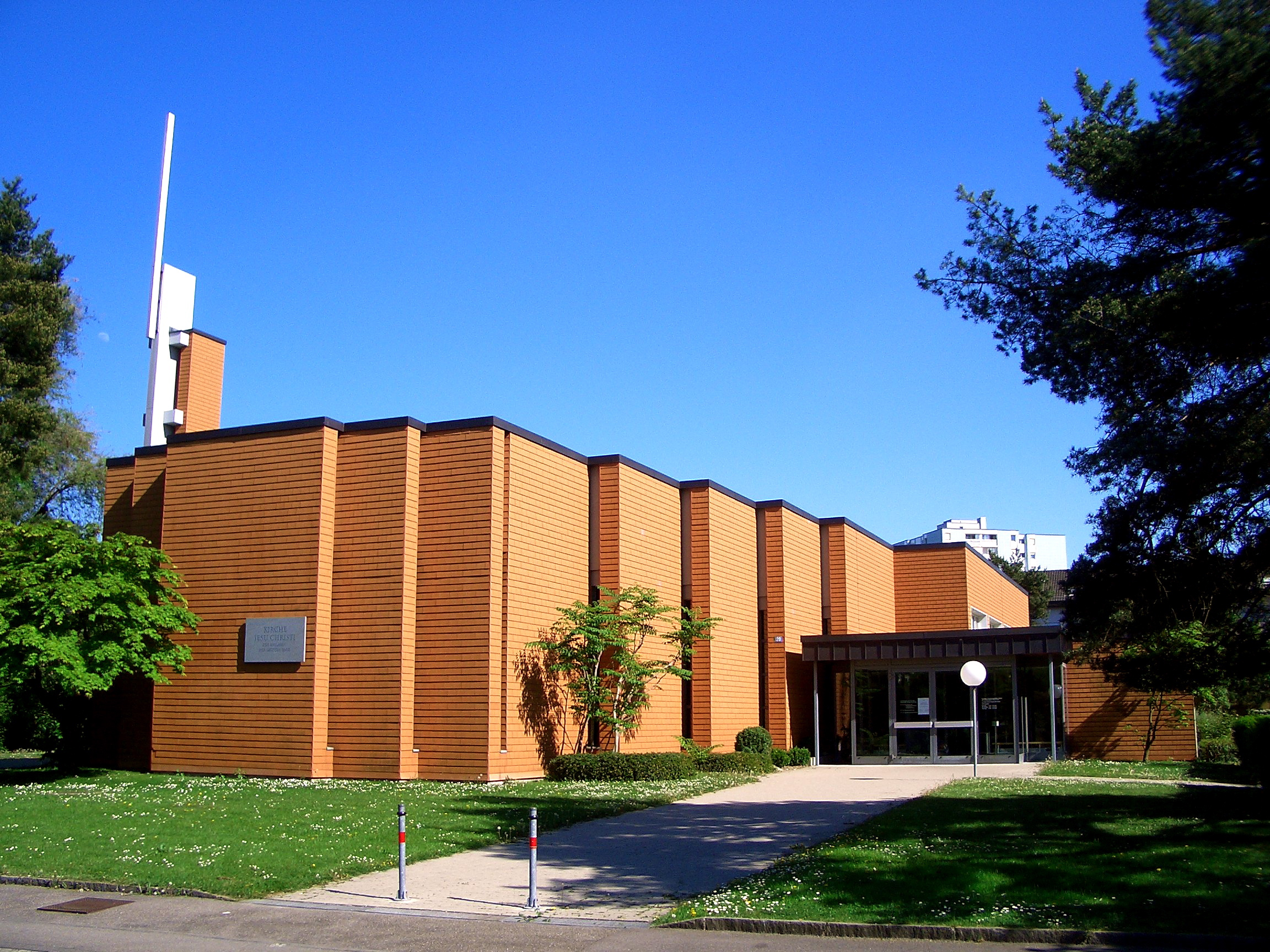
Zürich, Switzerland

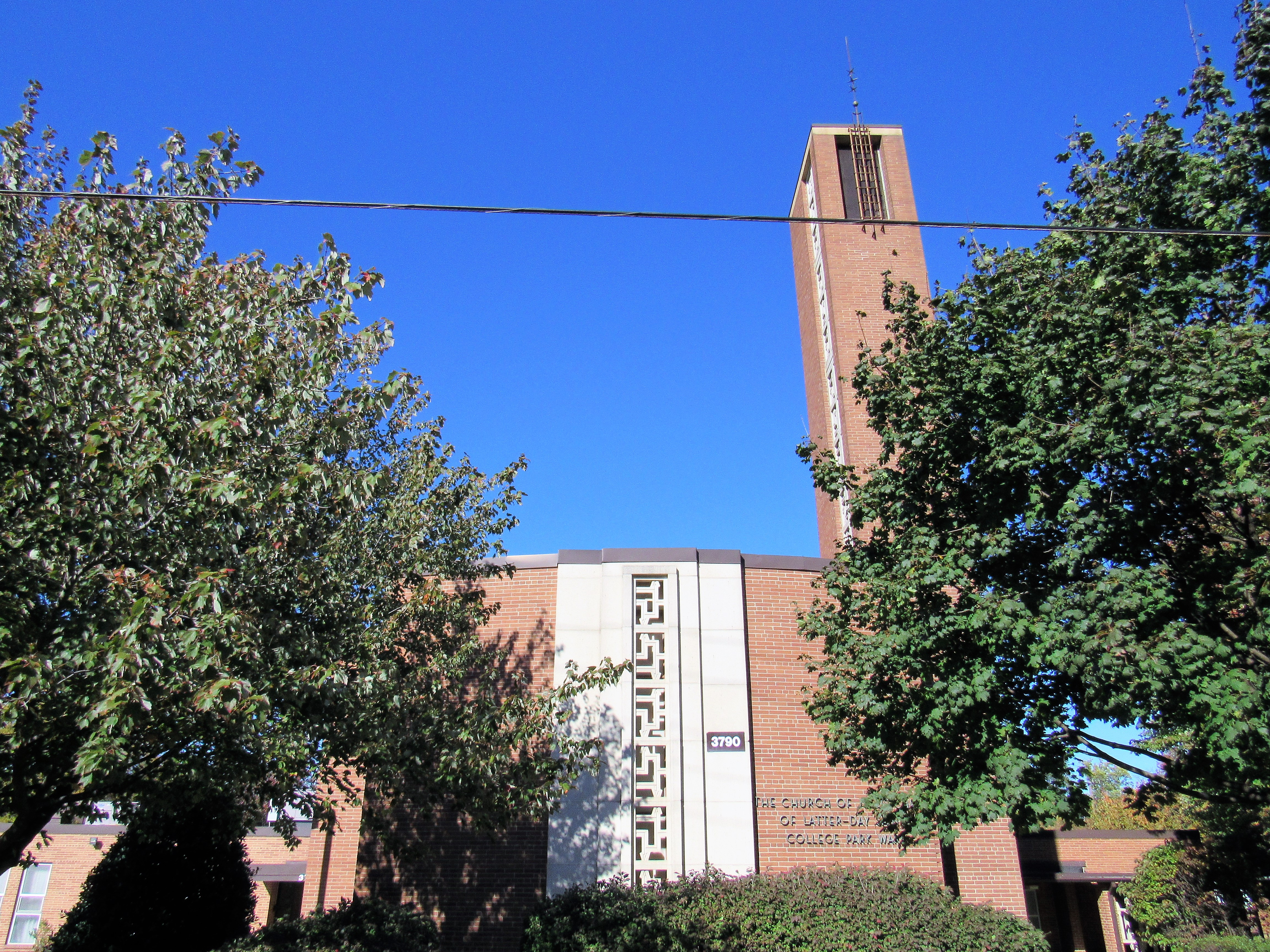
Hyattsville, Maryland

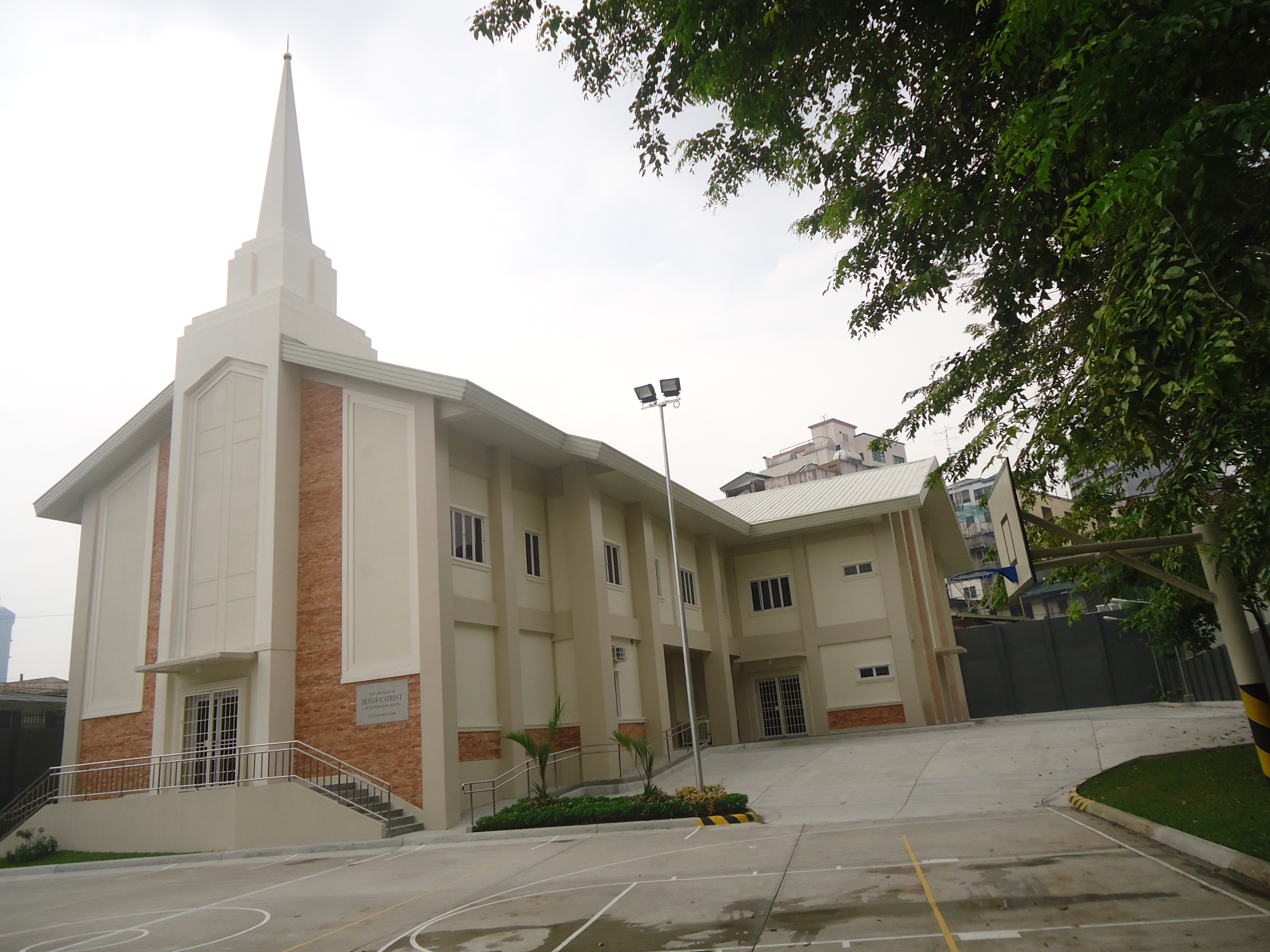
Makati, Philippines

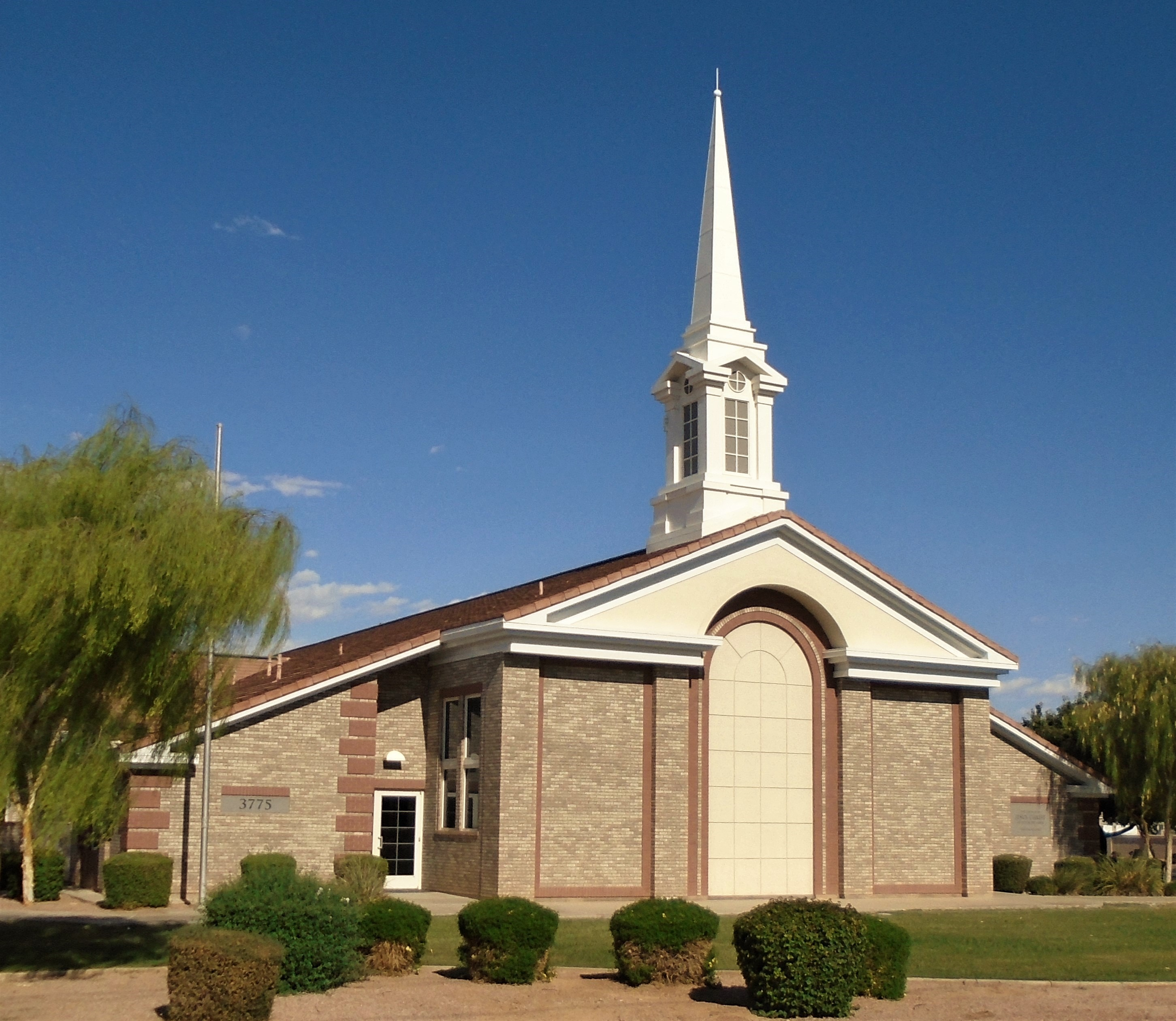
Gilbert, Arizona

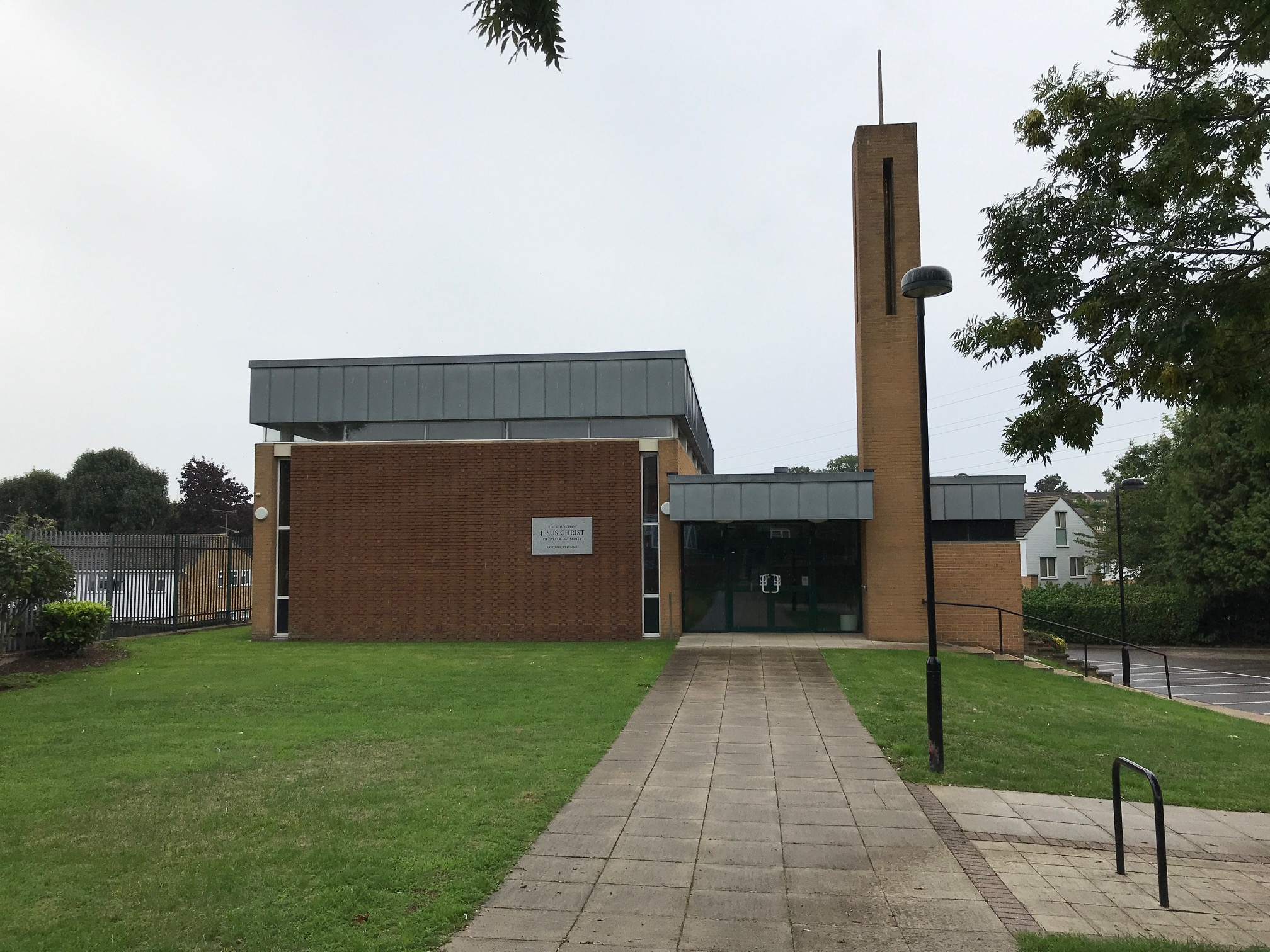
Selsdon, England

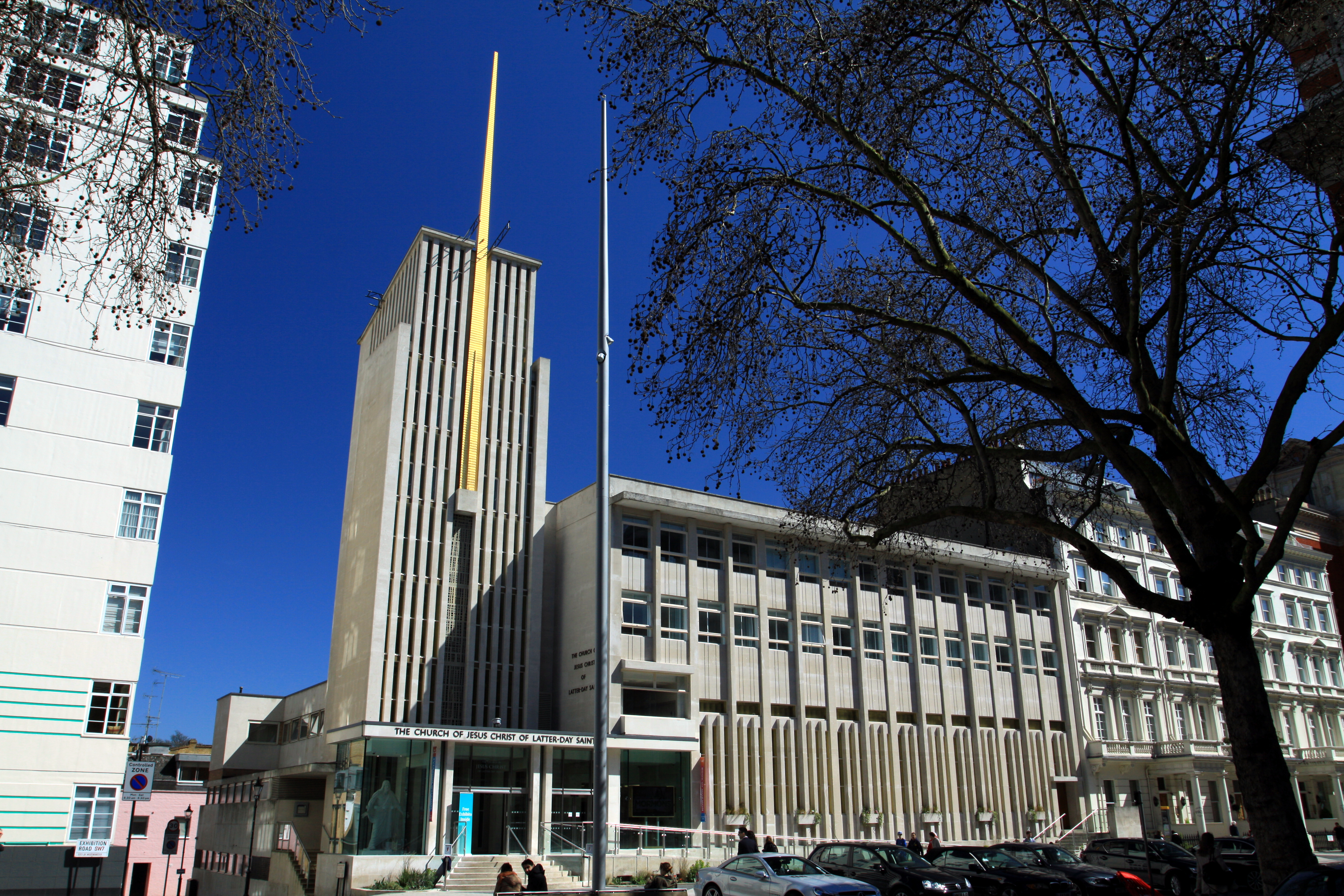
London, England

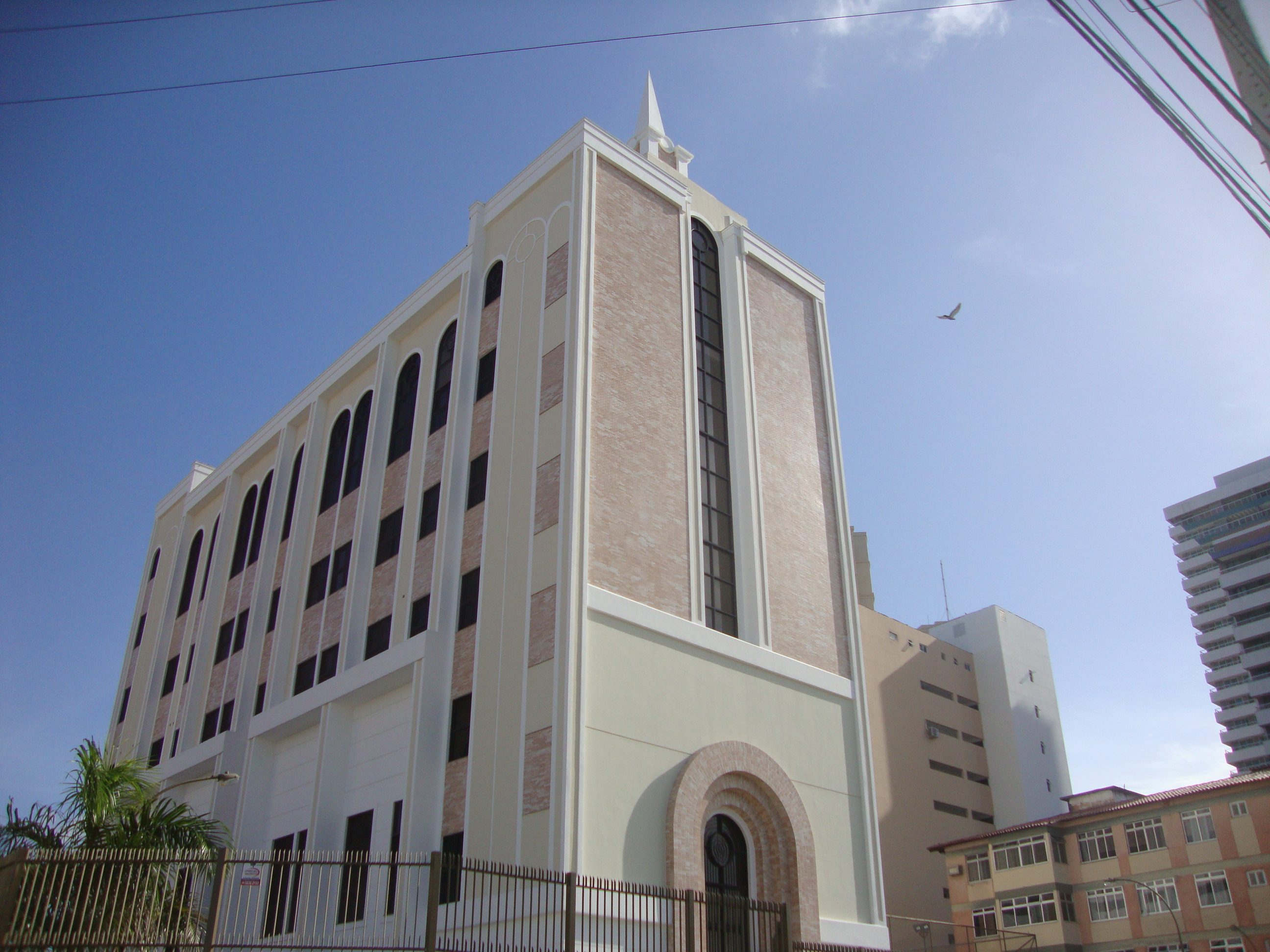
Fortaleza, Brazil
