= Worship services of the Church of Jesus Christ of Latter-day Saints =

Worship services of the Church of Jesus Christ of Latter-day Saints (LDS Church) include weekly services held in meetinghouses on Sundays (or another day when local custom or law prohibits Sunday worship) in geographically based religious units (called wards or branches). Once per month, this weekly service is a fast and testimony meeting. Twice each year, the LDS Church holds a worldwide general conference. LDS Church adherents also worship in temples, available for worship and participation in ordinances performed there by those who hold a temple recommend.

== Weekly services ==
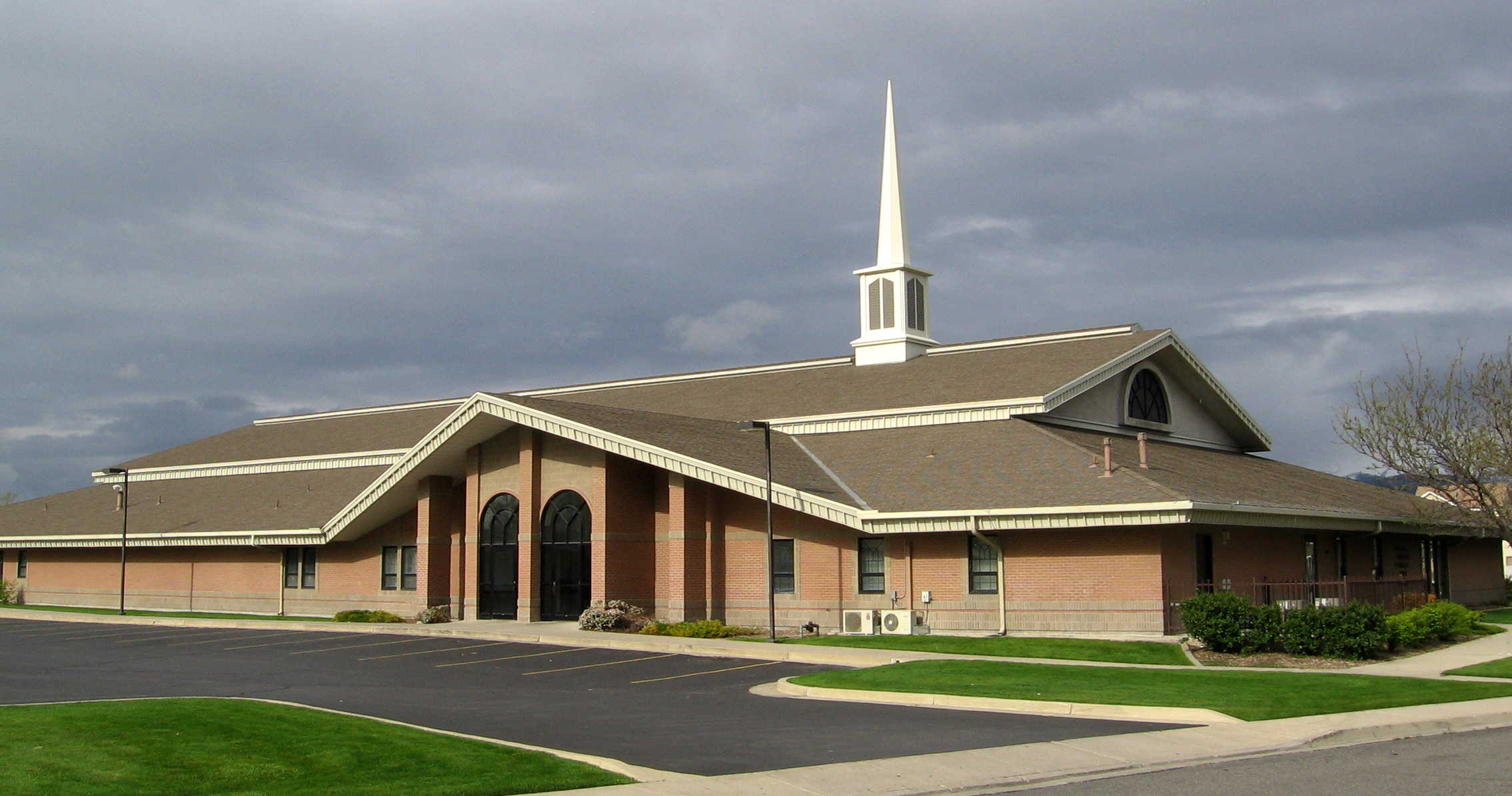
Latter-day Saint meetinghouse in West Valley City, Utah, US

In the LDS Church, congregations for Sunday services are grouped geographically, with larger (roughly 150 to 400 people) groups known as wards, and smaller (2 to about 150 people) ones, known as branches. The congregations gather in meetinghouses, also referred to as "chapels" or "stake centers," on property that is typically owned by the church. In some cases, rental property may be used as a meetinghouse. Although the building may sometimes be referred to as a "chapel," the room that is used as a chapel for religious services is actually only one component of the standard meetinghouse.

All people, regardless of belief or standing in the church, are permitted to attend weekly meetings. The sacrament (similar to communion, the Lord's supper, or the eucharist in other churches) is offered weekly. Latter-day Saints also come together in meetinghouses for various activities throughout the week (except Mondays, which are reserved for Family Home Evening). The church maintains a meetinghouse locator to help members and visitors find meetinghouses and meeting times in their area.

Unlike most religions, members are expected to attend the specific ward they reside in and are discouraged from choosing a different congregation that meets in a different place or at a more convenient time. There are some exceptions to this rule (see below), but for the most part members are discouraged from "shopping" for a different ward that is more convenient for them, or that has one where they might attend with friends or relatives, or that has a more likeable leader.

While there is no formal dress requirement for Sunday meetings, women usually attend wearing skirts or dresses, and men wear suits or dress shirts and ties.

=== Three-hour block ===
Through the end of 2018, weekly services consisted of a three-hour block of time divided into three segments.

Length	Adults		Youth		Children
70 min	Sacrament meeting				
10 min	Transition				
40 min	Sunday School		Youth Sunday School		Primary
10 min	Transition				Primary
50 min	Relief; Society	Melchizedek Priesthood	Aaronic Priesthood	Young; Women	Primary

In some congregations, the "block" schedule of meetings may have been held in reverse order of the table shown, wherein sacrament meetings would be held at the end of that block, after the other two meetings.

=== Two-hour block ===
On October 6, 2018, the church announced that beginning in January 2019, weekly services would consist of a two-hour block divided into two segments as follows (with the Sunday of each month on which the indicated meetings are to occur identified):

Length	Adults	Youth	Children
60 min	Sacrament meeting		
10 min	Transition		
50 min	Sunday School (1st and 3rd Sundays) Relief Society and Melchizedek Priesthood (2nd and 4th Sundays) Under direction of the bishop (5th Sunday)	Youth Sunday School (1st and 3rd Sundays) Young Women and Aaronic Priesthood (2nd and 4th Sundays) Under direction of the bishop (5th Sunday)	Primary

=== Adjustments due to COVID-19 ===
Due to the COVID-19 pandemic, church leaders announced in mid-March 2020 that all large public gatherings, including weekly worship services, would be discontinued until further notice. Weekly services have since resumed in many locations, as directed by local area presidencies.

== Elements of weekly worship services ==
=== Sacrament meeting ===
The main Sunday service is the sacrament meeting, which is attended by the combined congregation. Following an adjustment in January 2019, the sacrament meeting is held for 60 minutes. The foremost purpose of the sacrament meeting is the blessing and passing of the sacrament—consecrated bread and water in remembrance of the body and blood of Jesus—to the congregation. After the sacrament, the service usually consists of two or three lay sermons, called "talks," prepared and delivered by congregation members. Hymns, accompanied by piano or organ, are sung throughout the service as a form of worship. Once a month, usually on the first Sunday, members are invited to bear their testimonies about Jesus and gospel principles instead of prepared talks. The testimonies are generally impromptu statements of personal faith. This meeting is called fast and testimony meeting.

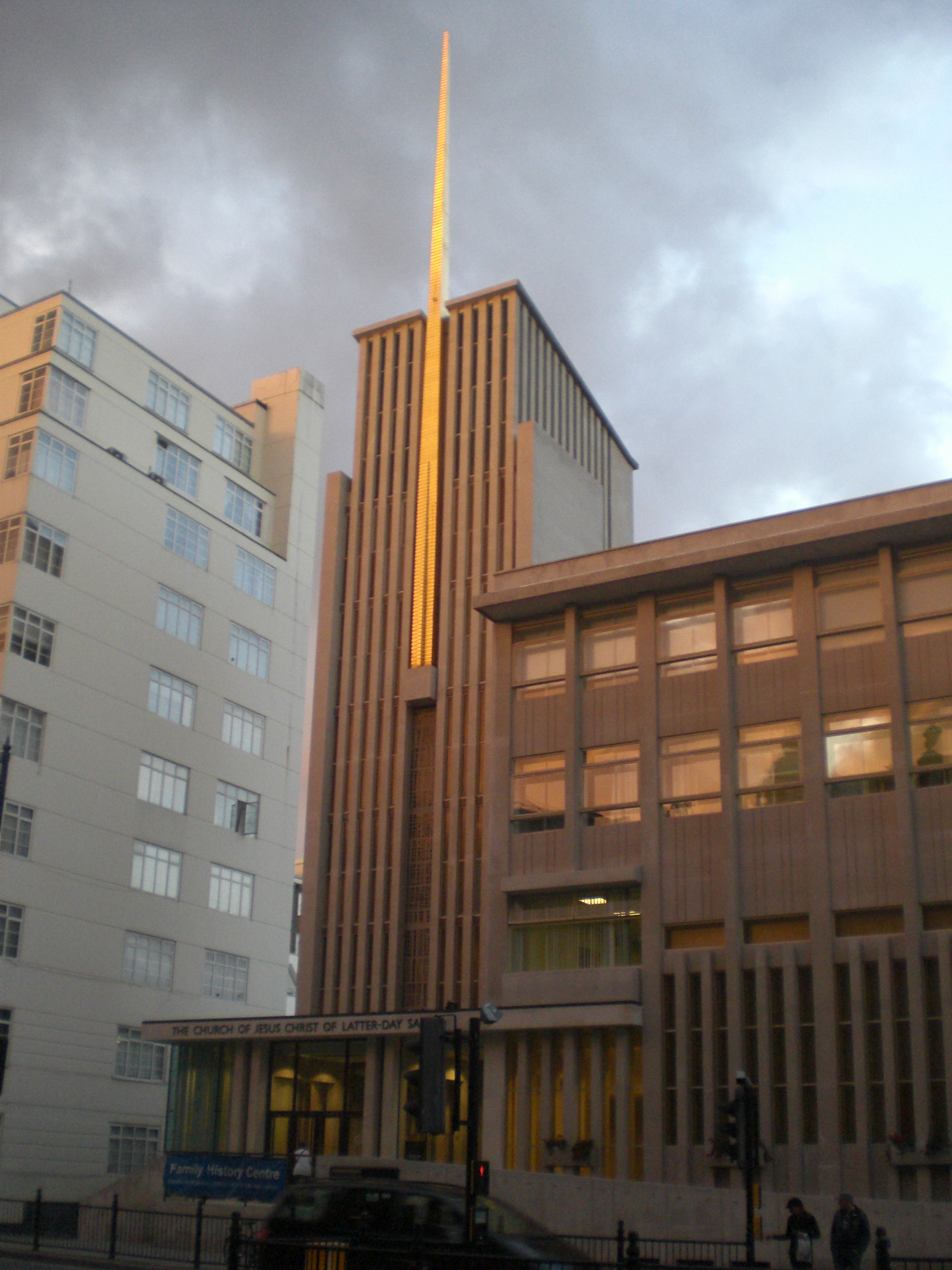
Meetinghouse on Exhibition Road, London, England

=== Sunday School ===
Sunday School classes are separated into adult and youth courses. Historically, adult Sunday School courses have been grouped by topic, with new members and visitors having the option to attend an introductory class. In congregations with a diverse membership, classes might be organized in which the approved courses are taught in a variety of languages. When necessary, wireless headphones are made available so that the discussion can be translated into other languages.

The Sunday School meets every other week and consists of a teacher presenting gospel messages drawn from the scriptures, with class members participating. Sunday School was held weekly before the January 2019 changes to the Sunday meeting schedule. In 2019, when the church moved to a two-hour block, Sunday School began being held every other week. Also, the two main adult classes were no longer called Gospel Doctrine and Gospel Principles, with encouragement for a combined adult class instead.

Multiple adult classes can be held for congregations where space will not allow a single class. Local Sunday School presidents and bishops can create these classes for specific groups, such as young single adults, members who don't speak the ward's primary language, new members, returning members, and those learning about the church, or other groups.

Historically, other optional adult Sunday School courses were held at various times, including during the second hour of the Sunday meeting block, depending on each congregation's specific needs. The most common was an optional adult course called Gospel Principles, designed for new members and those of other faiths interested in learning more about the church (often called "investigators"). Other courses included topics such as marriage and family relations and temple preparation. Since January 2019, the optional Sunday School classes are no longer taught during the meeting block. Each ward bishop will determine how other optional courses, including those before or after baptism, will be taught outside the two-hour block.

Youth Sunday School courses are for those aged 12 to 18 and may be divided or combined by age, depending on local needs, such as the number of youth. In 2013, the church instituted a new youth curriculum with uniform doctrinal themes, which allows leaders and teachers to adapt classes to the needs of youth.

Beginning in January 2019, a new "home-centered and church-supported" program of gospel instruction was adopted using the same manual, Come, Follow Me, for adult, youth, and primary instruction both at church and home. With this new curriculum, lessons and messages from the second hour of church correspond with the lessons to be taught at home throughout the week.

=== Priesthood meetings ===
Men and boys 12 and older attend priesthood classes. Although all men and boys meet briefly at the beginning of the session for a prayer, hymn, and announcements, they then separate into classes. The men attend Elders Quorum. Boys are divided into priesthood quorums: Deacons (ages 12–13), Teachers (ages 14–15), and Priests (ages 16–18). Classes may be combined if class sizes are small.

=== Relief Society and Young Women meetings ===
Adult women attend Relief Society, and girls aged 12 to 17 attend Young Women. Occasionally, the Relief Society and Young Women meet briefly at the beginning of the session for a prayer, hymn, and announcements, and then separate into classes, as the men and boys do. The Young Women are divided into multiple classes, typically ages 12–13, 14–15, and 16–17.

=== Primary ===
Children younger than 12 attend Primary. Through the end of 2018, Primary consisted of two time blocks of 50 and 60 minutes. Beginning in January 2019, Primary consists of a single 50-minute block. Primary is generally divided into two groups: Senior Primary (ages 8–11) and Junior Primary (ages 4–7); young children from 18 months to 3 years of age may attend a nursery class. Primary classes generally consist of children born in the same calendar year. Usually, half of the Primary group, such as Senior Primary, meet in separate classes, while the other half, Junior Primary, meet for "sharing and singing time". At the end of each block, the two are reversed. Since January 2019, the 50-minute block for Primary includes singing time and instruction, with sharing time discontinued. Individual congregations have the option of having the entire Primary meet for instruction and singing time.

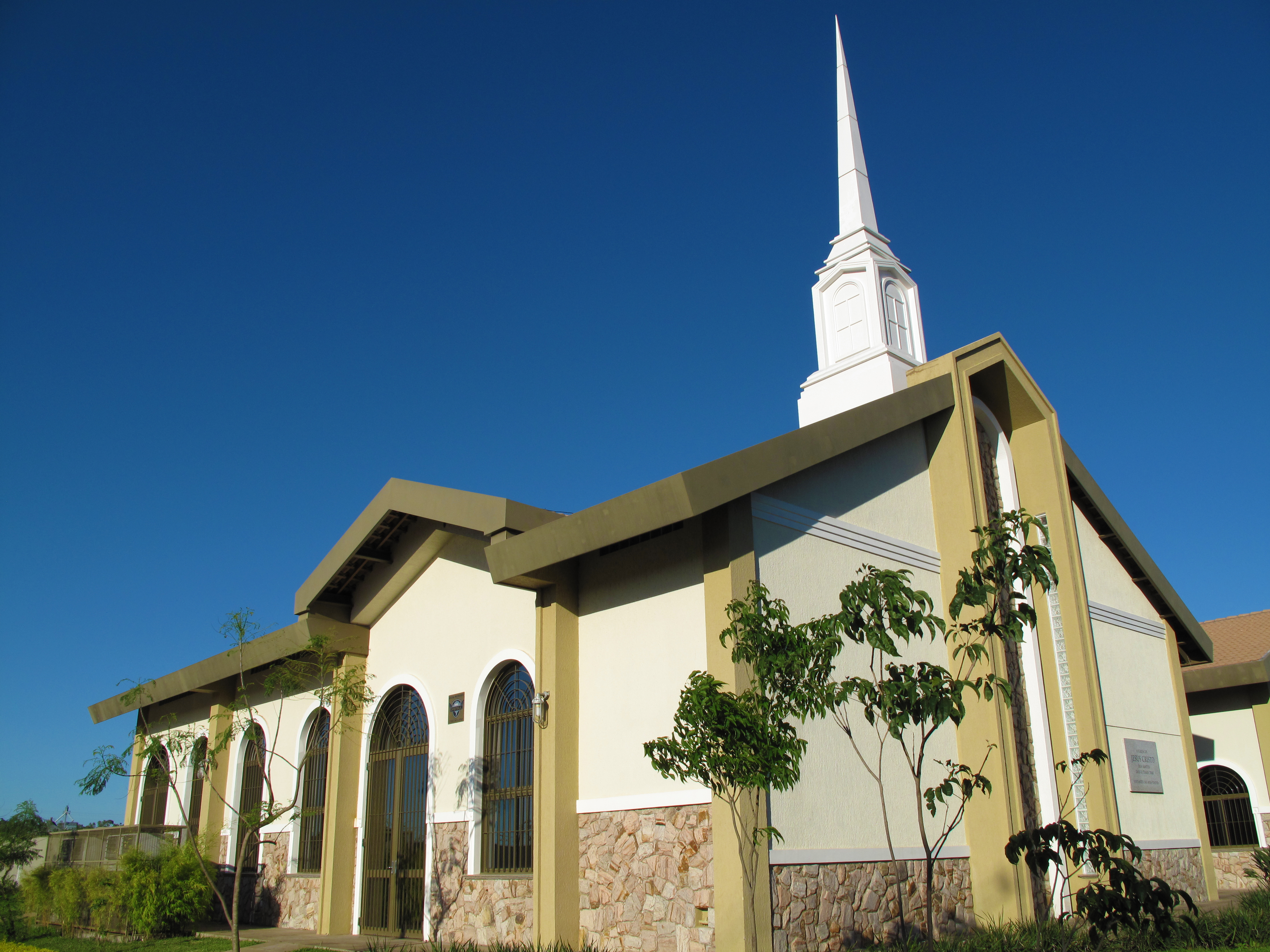
Meetinghouse in Uruguaiana, Rio Grande do Sul, Brazil

=== Teacher council meeting ===
In 2016, the church announced that each ward would hold a teacher council meeting once a month during the three-hour schedule of Sunday meetings. Those attending teacher council meetings include everyone who teaches a quorum or class in the ward and at least one of the priesthood or auxiliary leaders responsible for those teachers. Before January 2019, Wards were to hold teacher council meetings for Relief Society, Young Women, and priesthood teachers during the second hour of the three-hour block and for the Sunday School teachers during the final hour of the three-hour block. Primary teachers would attend the teacher council meeting held during the block hour, corresponding to when their class participates in sharing time. If necessary, participants could be divided into groups according to the needs of those they teach.

Since January 2019, each ward has held a teacher council meeting quarterly during the 50-minute class time. A ward will typically hold teacher council meeting for Relief Society, Young Women and priesthood teachers on a first or a third Sunday and for Sunday School teachers on a second or a fourth Sunday. Primary teachers may attend the teacher council meeting on any Sunday as determined by the ward Primary presidency.

== Fast and testimony meeting ==
The fast and testimony meeting is a monthly sacrament meeting held on a stake's Fast Sunday, which is typically the first Sunday of each month. Those members who feel prompted go to the podium and share (or "bear") their testimony with the other members of their congregation. Members may choose to fast on this weekend for two meals and donate the money they would have spent for those meals to the church as fast offerings, which are used to operate the church's welfare program. As with all other donations, these are privately paid through donation slips or on the Internet. A ward or a family can fast in unity for a purpose, such as for an ill member or other personal or family needs.

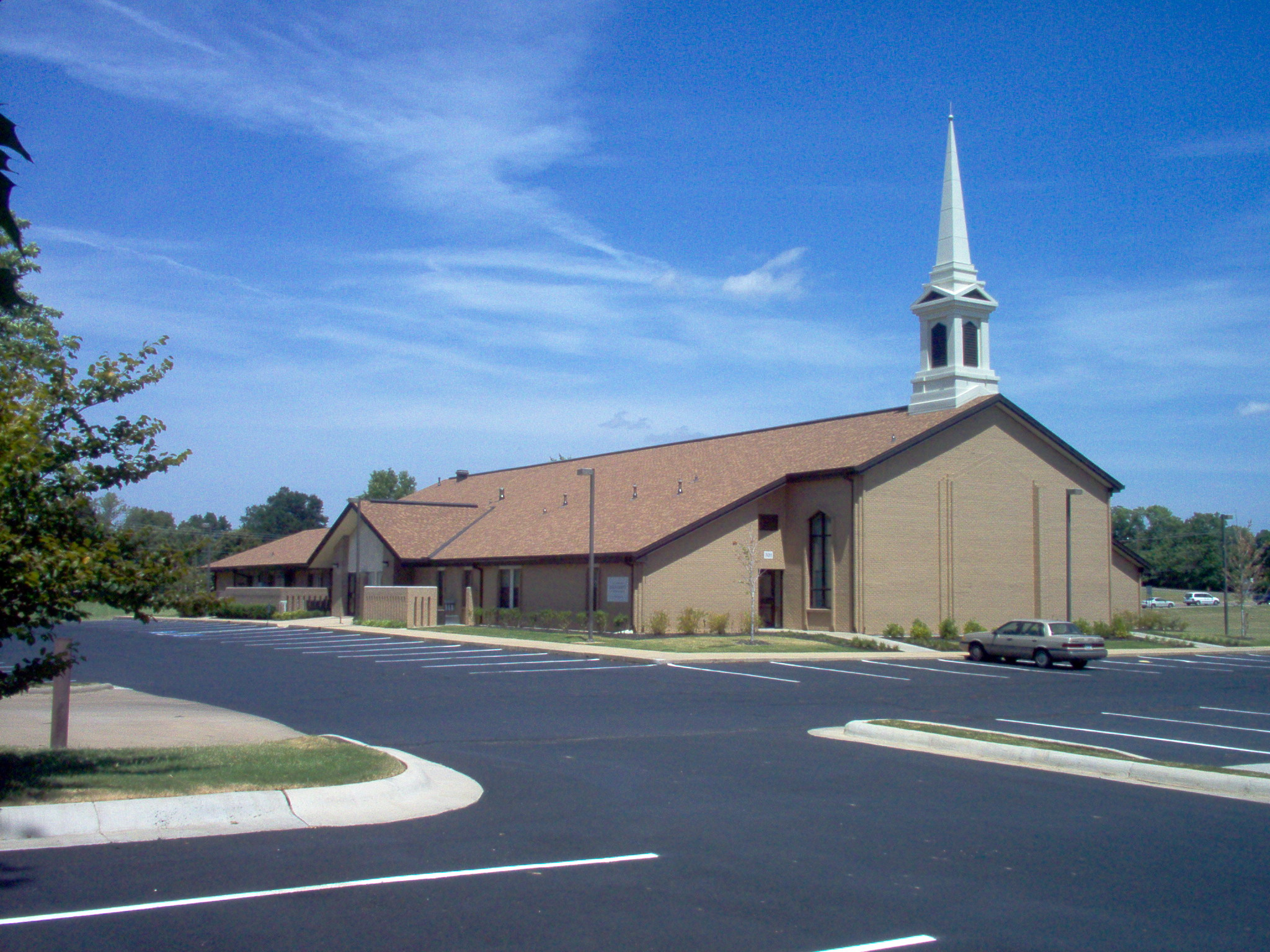
LDS meetinghouse in Jonesboro, Arkansas, USA

The church definition of a testimony is "a spiritual witness given by the Holy Ghost. The foundation of a testimony is the knowledge that Heavenly Father lives and loves His children; that Jesus Christ lives, that He is the Son of God, and that He carried out the infinite Atonement; that Joseph Smith is the prophet of God who was called to restore the gospel; that The Church of Jesus Christ of Latter-day Saints is the Savior's true Church on the earth; and that the Church is led by a living prophet today. With this foundation, a testimony grows to include all principles of the gospel." Individuals bearing testimony are directed by the feelings of their heart or by the Holy Ghost as to what to share. Members are expected to be brief so that others may have the opportunity.

== General Conference ==
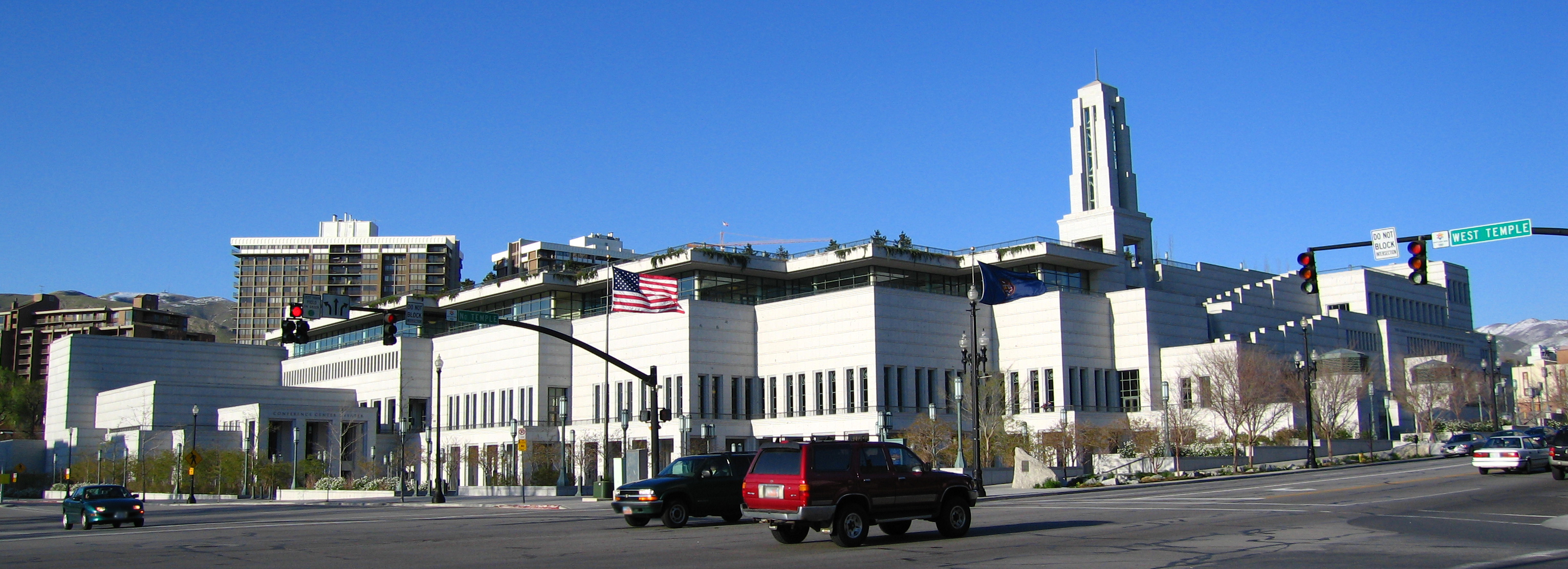
Conference Center in Salt Lake City, Utah

Twice a year, the LDS Church holds general conference, where the church's president and other leaders speak. The talks, given in several sessions over several days, are carried worldwide by radio, television, satellite, and Internet broadcasts. Beginning in October 2018, the sessions consist of four general sessions, a women's session (in October each year) and a priesthood session (in April each year). The talks are translated into over 80 languages and are later made available on ChurchofJesusChrist.org and in printed church publications such as the Ensign and Liahona.

Conference talks address doctrinal topics drawn from scriptures and personal experiences, messages of faith and hope, church history, and information on the church, as it expands throughout the world.

Throughout the 20th century, conference was held in the Salt Lake Tabernacle. With a maximum capacity of about 8,000 per session, the Tabernacle consistently filled to capacity, leaving thousands of attendees listening on loudspeakers outside or via broadcast in adjacent buildings. In 2000, the LDS Church dedicated a new 21,000-seat Conference Center, which became the home of general conference.

Conference satellite broadcasts may be watched live in thousands of chapels worldwide. The public is invited to attend or watch general conference either through the broadcasts, on the Internet, in the Conference Center, or other areas at Temple Square. The conference is also broadcast nationally and internationally on many satellite or cable providers through BYUtv and on local networks in some areas.

== Worship in temples ==
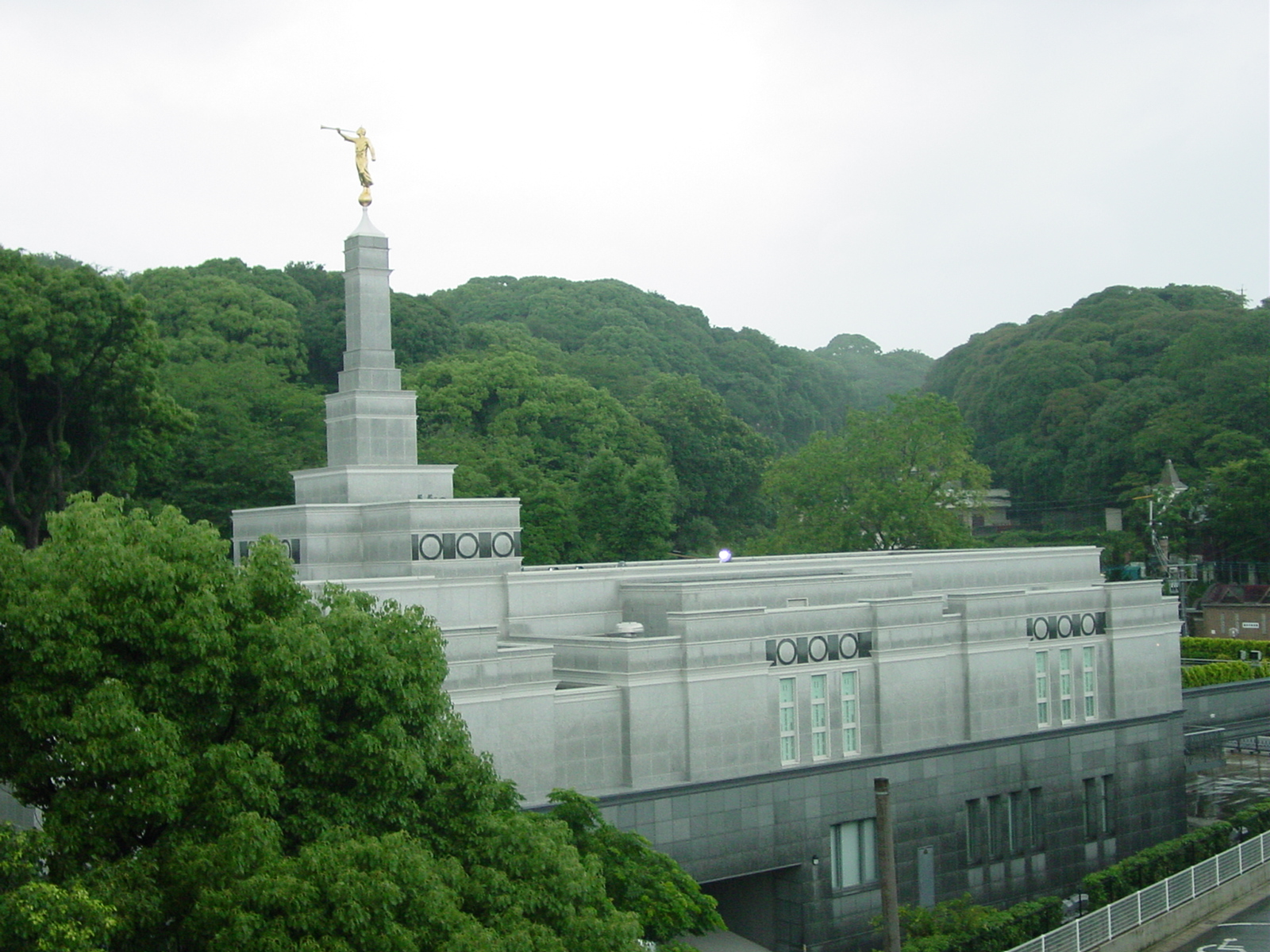
Fukuoka Japan Temple

In the LDS Church, a temple is a building dedicated to be a "House of the Lord," and they are considered by church members to be the most sacred structures on earth. Upon completion, temples are usually open to the public for a short period of time during an "open house." During the open house, the church conducts tours of the temple with missionaries and members from the local area serving as tour guides, and all rooms of the temple are open to the public. After a temple is dedicated, only members in good standing are permitted entrance and so they are not meetinghouses or houses of public worship. Most LDS temples are identified by a gold-colored Angel Moroni statue, adorning the top of the tallest spire.

Temples have a different purpose from meetinghouses. In the LDS Church today, temples serve two main purposes: (1) temples are locations in which Latter-day Saints holding a temple recommend can perform ordinances on behalf of themselves and their deceased ancestors, and (2) temples are considered to be a house of holiness where members can go to commune with God and receive personal revelation.

== See also ==
- June Conference
- Mormon music
- Service of worship
