= Bishop's storehouse =

Commodity resource in the Church of Jesus Christ of Latter-day Saints

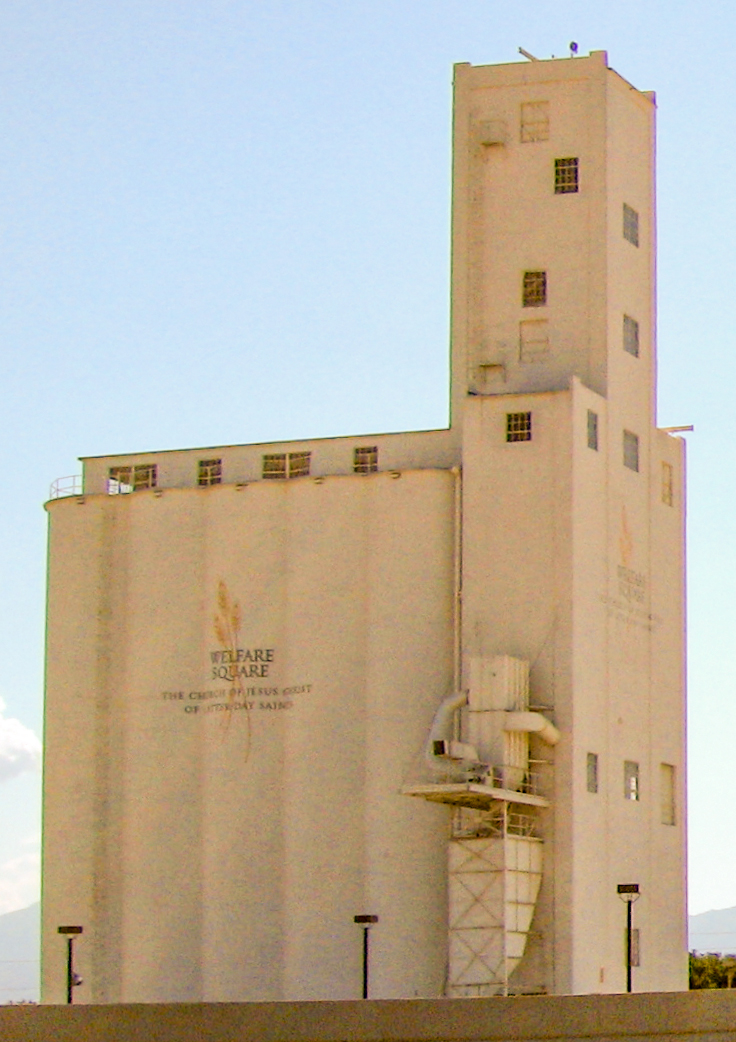
Granary building at the LDS Church's Welfare Square in Salt Lake City, Utah. Welfare Square began in 1938 as a bishops' storehouse.

A bishops' storehouse in the Church of Jesus Christ of Latter-day Saints (LDS Church) usually refers to a commodity resource center that is used by bishops (lay leaders of local congregations analogous to pastors or parish priests in other Christian denominations) of the church to provide goods to needy individuals. The storehouses stock basic foods and essential household items. The term can also be used figuratively to refer to all of the time, talents, skills, materials, compassion, and financial means of the members of the church that are available to be applied in the service of the needy.

As of January 2010 there are 138 bishops' storehouses in operation.

== Origin ==
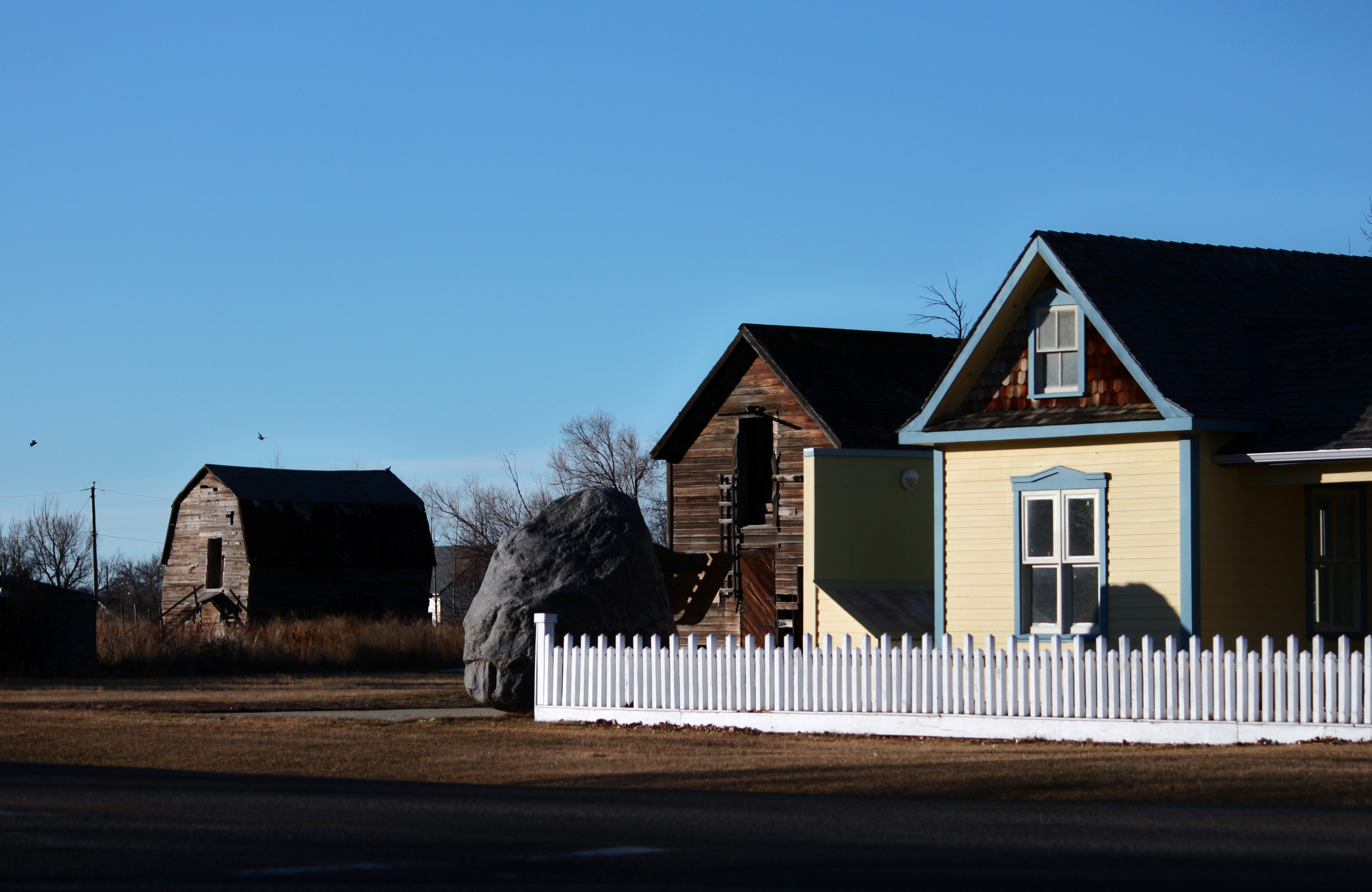
Replica pioneer home and Bishops' Storehouse to the left. Stirling Agricultural Village, Alberta.

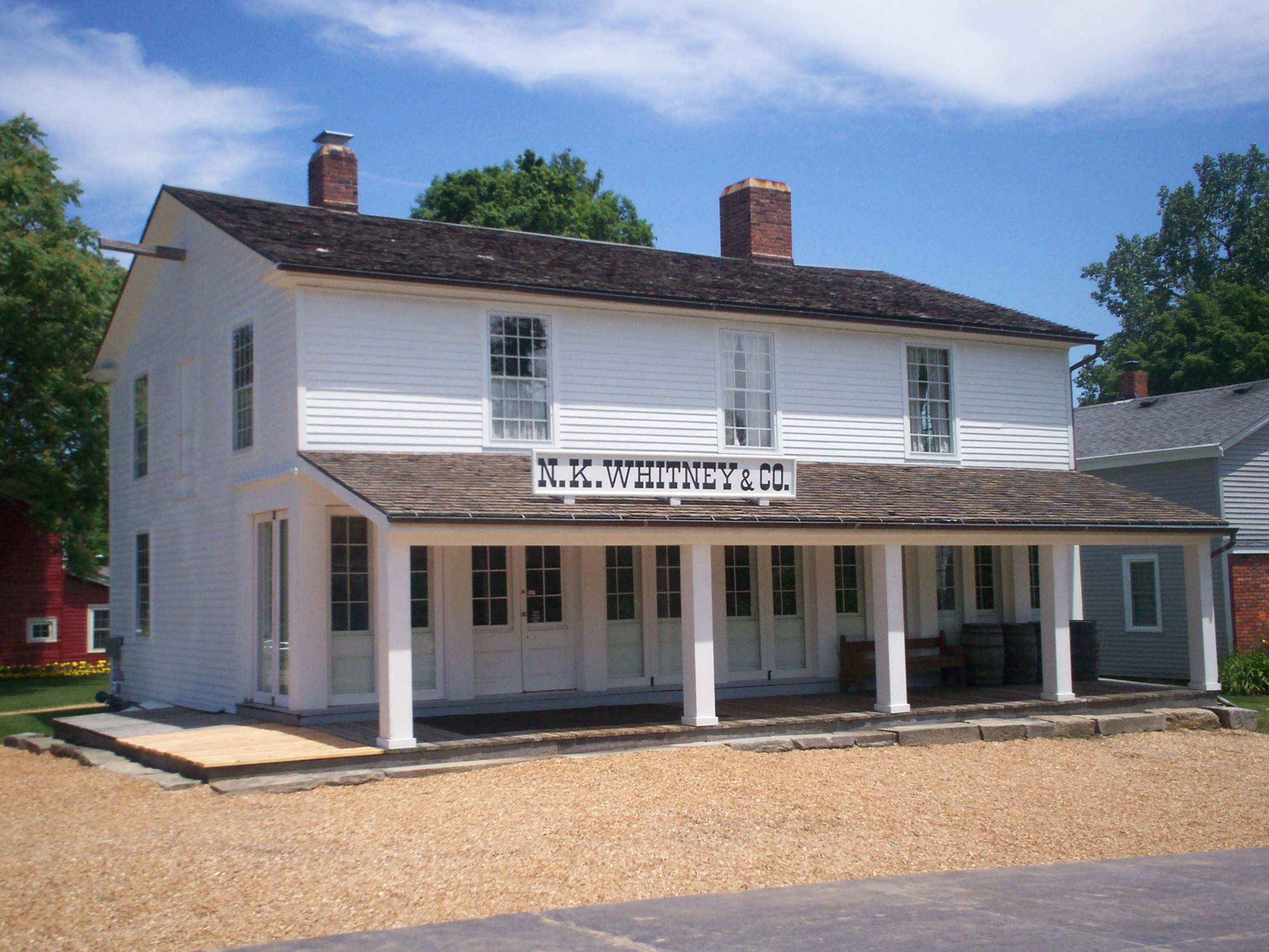
The Newel K. Whitney Store in Kirtland, Ohio.

The concept of the bishops' storehouse is based on a revelation received by Joseph Smith, founder of the Latter Day Saint movement, on February 9, 1831, whereby he was instructed to keep goods "in my [the Lord's] storehouse, to administer to the poor and the needy". The first bishops' storehouse was established in Bishop Newel K. Whitney's store in Kirtland, Ohio.

== Operation ==
Most of the goods in the storehouse are purchased with fast offering funds or produced on church-owned agricultural property. The storehouses are staffed by volunteers or church service missionaries. Persons in need, whether members of the church or not, can access the storehouse by approaching a bishop or local Relief Society president. The bishop decides whether or not the person will be given assistance and works with the Relief Society president in determining what the person will be given. The usual practice is to ask the recipient to work or render some form of service in exchange for the goods given them.

Bishops' storehouses are not commercial entities and goods are generally not for sale to the public through them.

== Building vs. available resources ==
There are buildings owned throughout the world that serve as bishops' storehouses. In areas of the world without a dedicated building, the bishop can render assistance by purchasing food and household necessities with church fast offering funds and delivering the goods to the recipient. This may also be done when the recipient has special dietary needs not catered to through the storehouse. The bishop can also draw on the "storehouse" of church members' available time, talents, and abilities to assist the needy.

== See also ==
- Fast Sunday
- Humanitarian Services
- LDS Philanthropies
- Tithe barn
- Lehi Ward Tithing Barn-Centennial Hall
