= Sacrament meeting =

Worship service of the LDS Church

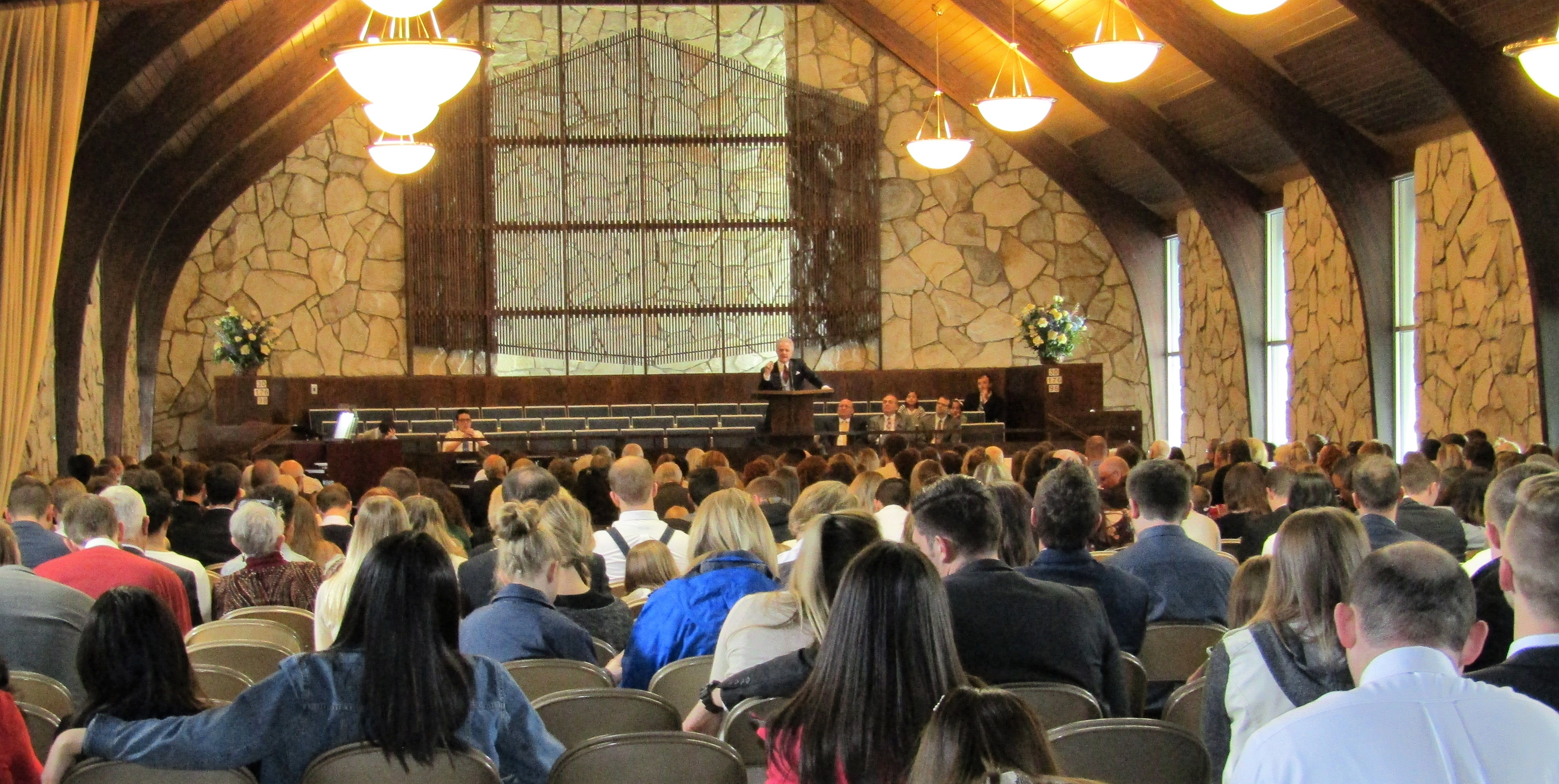
An LDS Sacrament Meeting in Utah

Sacrament meeting is the primary weekly Sunday worship service in the Church of Jesus Christ of Latter-day Saints (LDS Church).

Sacrament meetings are held in the chapel of a meetinghouse by each individual ward (or branch). The service is presided over by the congregation's bishop (or branch president), unless a higher authority is present, such as the stake president or a general authority. Anyone is invited to attend, whether they are a member of the church or not. Sacrament meeting does not occur on the weeks when stake or district conferences, or the church's general conference are held.

Those attending sacrament meeting generally wear "Sunday formal" dress. Men wear suits and ties, and women wear modest dresses or skirts. Children are also encouraged to attend.

== History ==
The first occurrence of a similar gathering to the current sacrament meeting occurred on April 6, 1830. This coincided with the organization of the Church of Christ, the forerunner of the LDS Church. This meeting included the administration of the Lord's Supper and the ordination of Joseph Smith and Oliver Cowdery as the "First Elder" and "Second Elder" of the church.

For much of the history of the church, sacrament meeting was held separately from other church meetings, often held on weekdays or on Sunday mornings. Sacrament meeting was the last meeting of the day on Sunday. In 1980, the church's First Presidency started the current "block" schedule, in which almost all church meetings were held in the space of three hours.

In October 2018, church president Russell M. Nelson announced plans to consolidate the Sunday meeting schedule. As a part of these plans, sacrament meeting was shortened from seventy to sixty minutes, and local church leaders were instructed to limit the announcements at the beginning of the meeting.

== Sequence ==
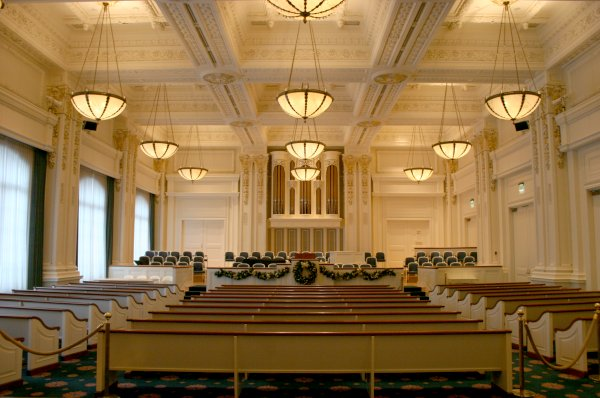
An LDS chapel in downtown Salt Lake City, Utah

=== Preparation ===
- Shortly before the start of the meeting, the bread and water – which constitute the sacrament – are prepared by one or more young men, generally teachers in the church's Aaronic priesthood.
- After the bread and water are readied, they are covered with a formal shroud, which resembles a tablecloth.
- Invitations to give prayers are generally extended by members of the bishopric or branch presidency.

=== Meeting ===
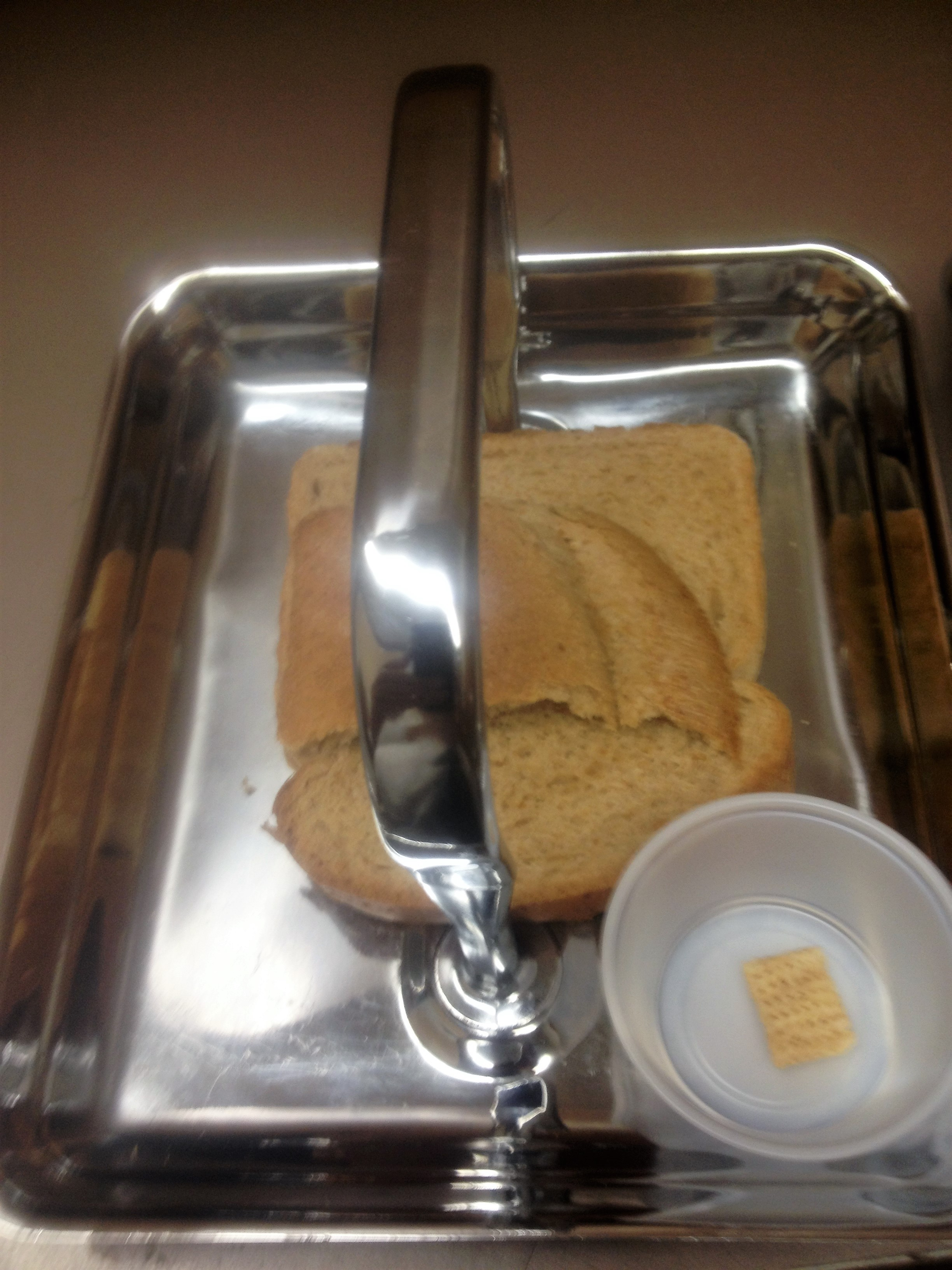
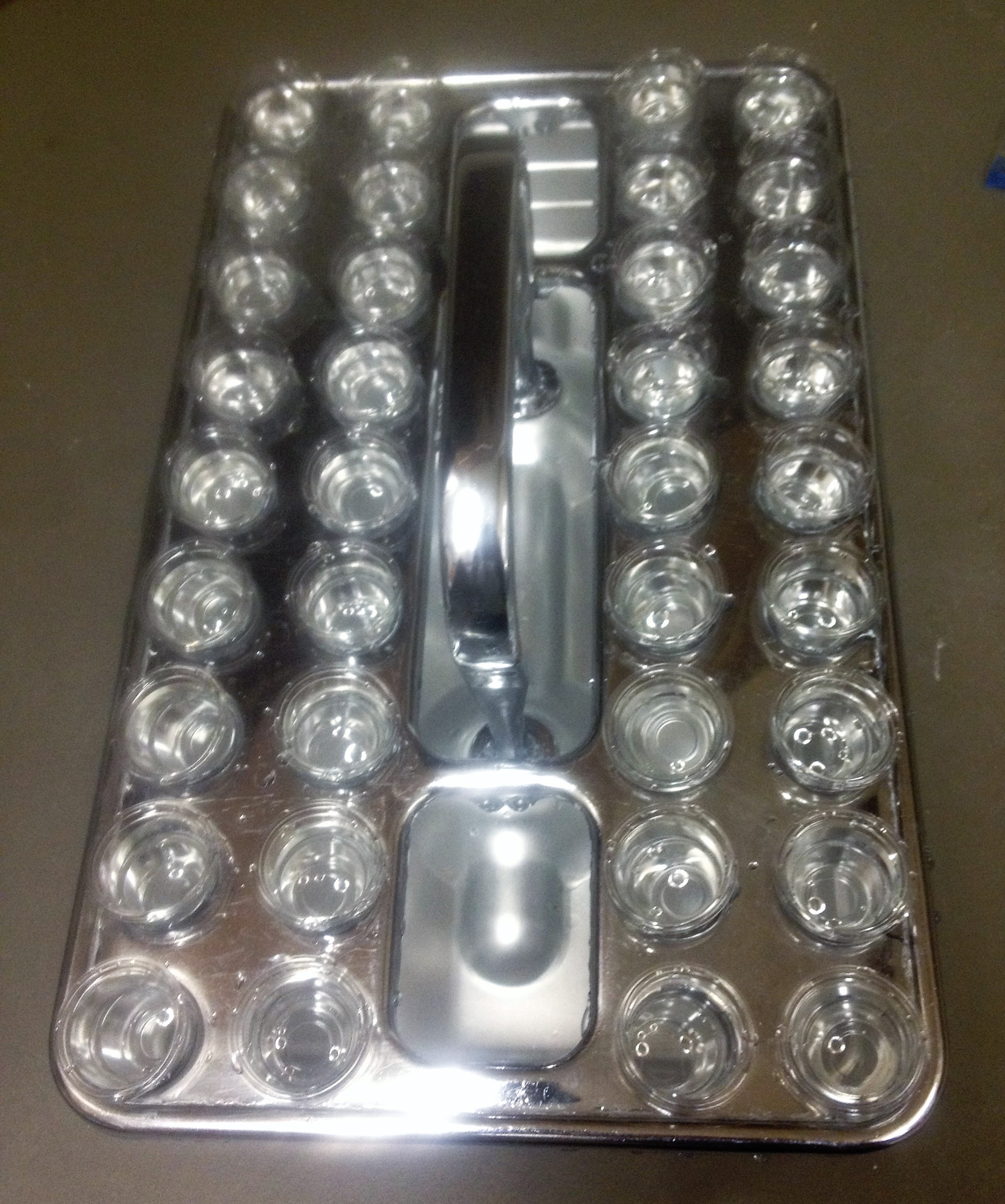
  Sacrament trays containing bread and water. The bread is broken and the trays are blessed and passed to the congregation.
  First, the conducting officer (usually a member of the bishopric or branch presidency) welcomes those in attendance.
- An opening hymn is sung by the congregation.
- The invocation, or opening prayer, is given by a member of the congregation.
- Church business is conducted. This includes the announcement of assignments and callings, the call for consent on various issues and assignments, and performance of ordinances, such as naming and blessing children and the confirmation of recently baptized converts. As with the announcements, this is optional and is only conducted when necessary.
- A sacrament hymn is sung by the congregation. As the song is sung, the priests of the Aaronic priesthood prepare the bread by breaking it into small (one inch or so) pieces. After this, the priests bless the bread. It is distributed to the congregation by deacons. After this, the priests bless the water, which is distributed in like manner. The prayers used are exact (see Doctrine and Covenants, Section 20:75–79). Where sufficient number of Aaronic Priesthood holders are not available, Melchizedek priesthood holders prepare, bless, and pass the sacrament, as needed.
- Various sermons, or speeches, also known as "talks", are delivered by previously assigned members of the congregation. Occasionally, visiting officials, such as members of the stake high council or stake presidency may speak. Often, congregational hymns or special musical numbers are included before or between talks. If it is Fast Sunday (typically the first Sunday of every month), the congregation is invited to share their testimonies as they feel inclined, rather than hearing prepared talks. (See Fast and testimony meeting.)
- The meeting closes with another congregational hymn and a benediction, or closing prayer.

Sacrament meetings usually last approximately 60 minutes. Other church meetings that follow, or precede, sacrament meeting include Sunday School and Relief Society or priesthood quorum meetings for adults; Sunday School classes, Young Women and Young Men classes for the youth; and Primary classes and a nursery for children. The sum of these meetings constitute Sunday services and typically lasts two hours.

== Significance ==
Members of the LDS Church believe that the ordinance of the sacrament allows them to renew the covenants they made when they were baptized. It is meant as an opportunity to be forgiven for their shortcomings during the week and to begin anew with renewed conviction.

With the approval of the bishop, priesthood holders may administer the sacrament to those who are homebound or otherwise cannot attend sacrament meeting.

A collection plate is not passed as part of sacrament meeting, or any other church service. The church operates by lay ministry, and local leaders, teachers, and speakers are not compensated. Church members make private contributions to the church, including tithing.
