= Fast offering =

Fast offering is the term used in the Church of Jesus Christ of Latter-day Saints (LDS Church) to denote money or usable commodities donated to the church, which are then used to provide financial or other assistance to those in need. The local bishop or branch president is responsible for the use of the fast offering resources, and is usually assisted by other local church leaders to identify individuals and families to receive assistance and to disburse the resources.

== Background ==
Members are encouraged to fast once a month on Fast Sunday and to give the money they save by not eating two meals to the church; those who can afford to be more generous are encouraged to give more than simply the money saved as a fast offering. Members may also choose to fast and donate fast offerings more than once per month.

When the Mormon pioneers first settled in the western United States in 1847, LDS Church leaders encouraged members to perform their fast on the first Thursday of each month, and to donate the food thus saved to their bishop. This food was collected in small buildings called "Bishop's Storehouses", and were held until needed by other members. Over time, this practice was changed: the members, who were primarily farmers and laborers, had difficulty fasting on a day of regular labor, so the day of observance was changed to Sunday. When money, in the form of specie instead of barter, became more available in Utah Territory, members were encouraged to make their donations in cash, which could better be held until needed to purchase food.

== Purposes ==
Donations from fast offerings are not used for the same purposes as those monies given through tithes. Specifically, fast offerings are used to provide food, shelter, clothing, medical care, and other necessities for those who are in need, fulfilling the meaning conveyed in Isaiah 58:6–11, with attendant blessings to the giver and the receiver. Tithing funds are used to build and maintain meetinghouses, temples, and educational facilities; for the general maintenance of church operations; and for costs of missionary and genealogical and family history work.

== Collection methods ==
Church members are encouraged to make regular financial contributions to the church through the leader of the local church unit, usually a bishop. The combined contribution can include tithing, fast offerings, and other humanitarian donations, and is delivered to the leader on a "convenience" basis (i.e., there is no set time either in or outside of a formal meeting where the funds are requested).

Young men (deacons or teachers in the Aaronic Priesthood) are often assigned to pass by members' residences to inquire if they can convey any fast offerings to the bishop. In some areas, members may also pay fast offerings on the Internet.

There is no requirement to make any financial donation to fast offerings or any of the church's other funds in order to maintain one's membership; such donations are encouraged but are not mandatory.

== Distribution ==
No publicly available accounting of fast offerings exists; however, the LDS Church does disclose its financials in the United Kingdom, Canada, and other jurisdictions where it is required to do so by law. These financials are audited by the UK office of PricewaterhouseCoopers. However, it is claimed by the church that fast offering funds are primarily available to the bishop to distribute to those in need in the area where they were collected, but that any excess (or deficiency) is shared with the rest of the church, first on a stake level, then on wider levels.

Bishops are instructed by church guidelines that they have "a divine mandate to seek out and care for the poor (see D&C 84:112). It is not enough to assist [with fast offerings] only when asked."

== Purpose of fast offerings, and financial prudence ==
While administering to the needs of the poor through use of the fast offering funds, each bishop is also counseled to encourage individuals and families to become self-reliant through reducing debt, seeking work opportunities or improved income through education if needed, and paying tithes and offerings to receive temporal blessings from the Lord as promised in Malachi 3:8–12.
