= Bishop (Latter Day Saints) =

Priesthood office in the Latter Day Saint movement

In the Latter Day Saint movement, a bishop is the highest office of the Aaronic priesthood. It is almost always held by one who holds the office of high priest in the Melchizedek priesthood. A Latter Day Saint bishop is analogous to a pastor or parish priest rather than a bishop in mainstream Christian denominations. A bishop serves with two counselors, who together form a bishopric.

The role of a bishop varies in the different Latter Day Saint denominations; however, they derive from a common history.

== History of the office ==
On February 4, 1831, Edward Partridge became the first man called to the office of bishop in the early Latter Day Saint church. The duties of the office were to oversee the temporal affairs and accounts of the church through the implementation of the law of consecration. Partridge was called to preside over the Missouri church in Joseph Smith's absence. Soon thereafter, Partridge and his family emigrated to the church's growing colony in Jackson County, Missouri, where he continued to act as bishop of the branch of the church. Newel K. Whitney was then called as a bishop to oversee the temporal affairs of the church in Kirtland, Ohio.

When the Latter Day Saints were headquartered in Nauvoo, Illinois, the membership was separated into three "wards" or geographical precincts ("Upper", "Middle", and "Lower"), and a bishop was called to oversee the temporal affairs of each ward. Partridge presided over the "Upper Ward", Whitney presided over the "Middle Ward", and Vinson Knight presided over the "Lower Ward".

Over time in the church's history, the position of Presiding Bishop was created. Partridge is considered the church's "First Presiding Bishop", although neither he nor his contemporaries saw him as a superior to other bishops of the church in that time period.

After the 1844 succession crisis, the roles of bishop and Presiding Bishop developed separately in the various resulting denominations of the Latter Day Saint movement.

== Levitical bishops ==
According to Latter Day Saint scripture, a bishop in the church does not need to be a high priest, nor does he need counselors, if he is a Levite and a direct descendant of Aaron, the brother of Moses. In the Church of Jesus Christ of Latter-day Saints (LDS Church), apostle Joseph Fielding Smith taught that this provision applied only to the Presiding Bishop of the church and not to bishops of wards.

The Presiding Bishop of the Remnant Church of Jesus Christ of Latter Day Saints, W. Kevin Romer, is recognized as a “literal descendant of Aaron” and holds the title of Aaronic High Priest.

== Bishops in the LDS Church ==
In the LDS Church, the largest Latter Day Saint denomination, bishops are called from among the members of a local congregation, known as a ward, and serve without pay for four to seven years though the length of service varies. A bishop must be a worthy Melchizedek priesthood holder and is usually married. The bishop serves as the presiding high priest of the ward. A bishop simultaneously serves as the president of the Aaronic priesthood and president of the priests quorum in the ward. In a branch, the branch president fulfills the same functions as a bishop; however, a branch president does not need to be a high priest.

The bishop is often called "the father of the ward" as he is the priesthood leader who is most intimately involved with individual church members. The bishop is not paid for the time he devotes to his position. All local positions in the LDS Church operate as a lay ministry; members donate their time to perform the duties assigned with each calling. Each bishop serves with two counselors, who together form a bishopric. The counselors to a bishop are generally high priests, but there are exceptions, such as in a singles ward, where the counselors may be elders.

The immediate priesthood leader of the bishop is the stake president, who provides direction, training and counsel to the bishops of the wards within his stake boundaries; the stake president is assisted in these duties by two counselors and a stake high council. New bishops are recommended by the stake president, but each bishop is formally approved by and called in writing by the church's First Presidency. Prior to ordination, the proposed ordination of a bishop must also be accepted by common consent by the members of the ward.

=== Duties ===
The bishop holds the primary responsibility for everything in the ward, both spiritually and temporally. Although he can delegate specific assignments to his counselors, the ultimate responsibility falls to him. His duties include presiding over and conducting meetings and worship services; serving as president of the ward's priests quorum; acting as a "judge in Israel" or "common judge"; providing temporary financial relief for ward members; serving as the presiding high priest of the ward; and organizing and managing the ward's organizations. After being called, a bishop is ordained a high priest (if he does not already hold that priesthood office) and then ordained a bishop and set apart as the bishop and presiding high priest of the specific ward. He is also given the priesthood "keys" which authorize him to serve as a representative for the Lord in performing his duties. The ordinations, setting apart, and the conferral of keys is performed by the laying on of hands by the stake president. After a bishop is released from his responsibilities over the ward, he retains the priesthood office of bishop for life.

- Presiding over services – Each Sunday, the bishop is responsible for organizing the main worship service, called sacrament meeting. The bishop and his counselors select speakers from among the members of the ward, assigned high council speakers, and, on occasion, guest speakers. The bishop or his counselors may also speak in sacrament meeting. A member of the bishopric conducts the meeting, introduces the speakers, and occasionally concludes the meeting with a few remarks. Once each month, normally the first Sunday of the month, a "fast and testimony meeting" is held and no specific speakers are assigned. Instead, those attending the ward that day are invited to stand and bear testimony of Jesus and his work and influence.
- President of the priests quorum – The bishop is the president of the Aaronic priesthood and the priests quorum in the ward. He selects two priests to serve as first and second assistants to the bishop. The bishop assists (along with parents) in preparing each priest to worthily serve as a missionary and to prepare to receive the ordinances of the temple. He also provides guidance and encourages the spiritual and temporal learning of every young priesthood holder. He is responsible for new member baptisms and missionary work in the ward.
- Judge in Israel – Members are interviewed by their bishop in order to receive a temple recommend. The bishop signs the recommend to indicate that the member is following basic tenets of the church and is worthy to enter the temple. Additionally, members seek guidance from the bishop in overcoming personal challenges. Serious sins must be confessed to the bishop who helps members through the repentance process. In some cases, the bishop presides over a church membership council where the outcome can include formal or informal membership restrictions or withdrawal of membership, depending on the severity of the sin and the attitude of the member. Additionally, the bishop also has the authority and duty to counsel members on spiritual matters, and sits as a "common judge" in the event of disputes between ward members. Bishops typically withdraw from involvement in matters which have been taken to the law.
- Provide temporally for the members of the ward – The bishop also has the responsibility to oversee the payment of tithes and offerings in a ward, including the duty to accurately account for all money donated. The bishop also has the authority to authorize financial assistance, specifically the disbursement of fast offerings donated to help the poor, and other assistance to members, according to the church's guidelines. Bishops can also provide "in kind" assistance in the form of food and household goods from the bishop's storehouse (which is managed by the Presiding Bishop [see below]). The bishop disburses funds, authorizes distribution of food from the bishop's storehouse, or provides other appropriate assistance after evaluating the needs of the family and the resources available in the ward.
- Serve as the presiding high priest for the ward – As the presiding high priest, the bishop leads meetings and has the priesthood authority to issue callings, approve the performance of ordinances, such as baptisms and the administration of the sacrament. The high priests that reside in several wards that form a stake are part of a quorum led by the stake president. In the ward, the bishop gives direction to and coordinates the efforts of the elders quorum president in performing their duties. (In each stake, the members of ward bishoprics, the stake high council, and any functioning patriarch form the stake high priest quorum, presided over by members of the stake presidency.)
- Organize and manage the other organizations in the ward – The bishop is responsible for calling and setting apart a local president for each of the church's organizations. These organizations are the Sunday School, Relief Society, Young Men, Young Women, and Primary. He also calls and sets apart Aaronic priesthood quorum and Young Women class presidents. The bishopric then approves the recommendations made by each organizational or quorum president for two counselors, a secretary, instructors, and other callings. In doing this, the bishop strives to help manage the time donated by members of the ward.

=== Branch presidents ===
In small congregations that are not large enough to be a ward, a holder of the Melchizedek priesthood is usually called to be the branch president. In rare instances where no worthy Melchizedek priesthood holder is available, a priest in the Aaronic priesthood may instead be called as the branch president. The branch president generally has the same responsibilities as a bishop and is assisted by two counselors. A branch president and his counselors may or may not be a high priest, and a branch president is not ordained to the priesthood office of bishop.

=== Presiding Bishop ===
The LDS Church also has a Presiding Bishop who oversees the temporal affairs of the church (including its welfare services) and provides assistance and instruction to the various bishoprics worldwide.

=== Traveling bishops ===
The calling of "traveling bishop" was prominent during the early Utah period of church history from roughly the 1850s-1880s. Traveling bishops were not assigned to a specific congregation, but were tasked to visit various wards and branches to take care and supervise over temporal matters.

== Bishops in Community of Christ ==
In many ways bishops of Community of Christ continue to resemble those found in the church prior to the death of Joseph Smith. They are not pastors or branch presidents, but financial officers and ministers of stewardship. While in theory a literal descendant of Aaron could hold this office, no such claim has ever been made, and therefore all bishops are members of the high priesthood, as a high priest can serve in any "lesser office". All bishops are members of the Order of Bishops, with presidency vested in the Presiding Bishopric (consisting of the Presiding Bishop and two counselors).

While all bishops are attached to a congregation (in the sense that every member of the church has a home congregation), bishops are not congregational officers, but preside as financial officers over larger jurisdictions, or support those who do. For example, each mission center will have a bishop in charge of all the finances of that area, who may be assisted by other bishops. Likewise, some nations have a national bishop, and historically, stakes also had bishops. Consequently, this makes the office of bishop somewhat uncommon. In recent years, some mission centers have had multiple bishops in order to help promote the various ministries associated with good stewardship.

Other bishops have been appointed as "field bishops" who are assigned to assist one of the twelve apostles. The Presiding Bishopric is also regarded as the presidency of the entire Aaronic priesthood. Bishops in general are therefore sometimes seen as ideal resources to provide support and mentoring to local members of the Aaronic priesthood.
