= Branch president =

A branch president is a leader of a "branch" congregation of the Church of Jesus Christ of Latter-day Saints (LDS Church).

The calling of branch president is very similar to the calling of bishop, except that instead of presiding over a ward, the branch president presides over a branch. The branch president is directly responsible for the operation of his branch and the well-being of its patrons. The branch president usually has two counselors to assist him in his duties; these three men comprise the branch presidency. Like almost all callings in the LDS Church, the branch president is not paid for his work in the church.

A branch president must hold the priesthood and at a minimum must hold the office of priest. Unlike a bishop, a branch president is not required to be a high priest, or be married, but conforming with these stipulations may depend on whether the branch is part of a district or a stake. In branches within stakes that contain several priesthood holders a branch president will usually be married and may be ordained to the office of high priest. In branches where no resident member is a worthy priesthood holder, a full-time missionary may be called to be branch president.

Branch presidents are given the honorific title "President".
