= Fast Sunday =

Practice in the Church of Jesus Christ of Latter-day Saints

Fast Sunday (previously Fast Day) is a Sunday set aside by the Church of Jesus Christ of Latter-day Saints for fasting by its members. On Fast Sunday, a fast and testimony meeting is held by local congregations of the Church of Jesus Christ of Latter-day Saints.

== Overview ==
On Fast Sunday, church members are encouraged to fast for a 24-hour period. Members are also encouraged to give the money they save by not eating as a fast offering, which will be used by the church to financially assist those in need.

On Fast Sunday, the sacrament meeting is known as fast and testimony meeting. In this meeting, rather than predetermined speakers on particular subjects, the members are given the chance to voluntarily bear extemporaneous testimony to one another of gospel truths. Non-members of the church are welcome to participate in Fast Sunday activities.

Fast Sunday is usually the first Sunday of each month. In some circumstances, the week of Fast Sunday may be adjusted by church leaders. In many areas of the world, this occurs in April and October, when the church's general conferences are held on the first Sunday of the month. They may also be adjusted due to stake conferences or temple dedications that are held on the first Sunday of the month.

In addition to the regular Fast Sunday, individuals, families, wards, or stakes may designate additional fast days for special needs of individuals, families, communities, or the church. No fast and testimony meeting is held for these non-regular fast days.

== History ==
Fast Day was started by Joseph Smith, as described by Brigham Young:

You know that the first Thursday of each month we hold as a fast day. How many here know the origin of this day? Before tithing was paid, the poor were supported by donations. They came to Joseph and wanted help in Kirtland, and he said there should be a fast day, which was decided upon. It was to be held once a month, as it is now, and all that would have been eaten that day, of flour, or meat, or butter, or fruit, or anything else was to be carried to the fast meeting and put into the hands of a person selected for the purpose of taking care of it and distributing it among the poor.

During the 19th century, almost a fifth of converts in the United Kingdom were miners by profession. Their physical work made fasting during the week very difficult and an exception was granted to allow British miners to fast on Sundays instead of Thursdays. The practice became popular among the wider membership of the church in Britain and quickly spread. In 1896, Fast Day was changed to the first Sunday of the month, instead of the first Thursday. Since then, it has commonly been referred to as Fast Sunday.

Modern LDS Church leaders have affirmed the need for a Fast Day. Church apostle Gordon B. Hinckley stated:

What would happen if the principles of fast day and the fast offering were observed throughout the world[?] The hungry would be fed, the naked clothed, the homeless sheltered. ... A new measure of concern and unselfishness would grow in the hearts of people everywhere.

== Studies ==
The LDS practice of intermittent fasting has been studied in the context of Mormons' lower rate of coronary artery disease and cardiac mortality. While this phenomenon has been attributed to LDS Church's prohibition on tobacco and alcohol use, fasting practices have also been hypothesized to play a role.
