= Sacrament (LDS Church) =

Ordinance

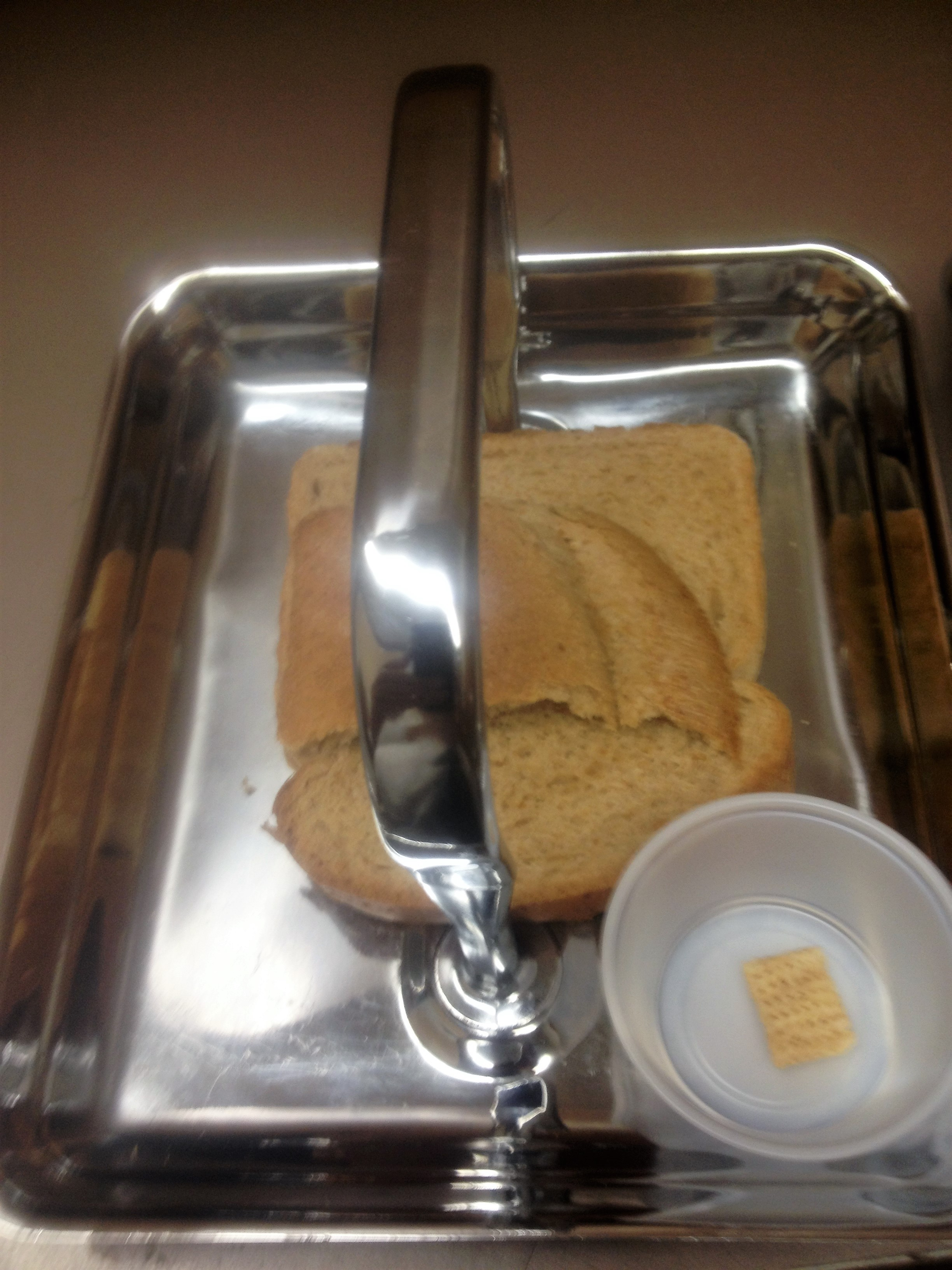
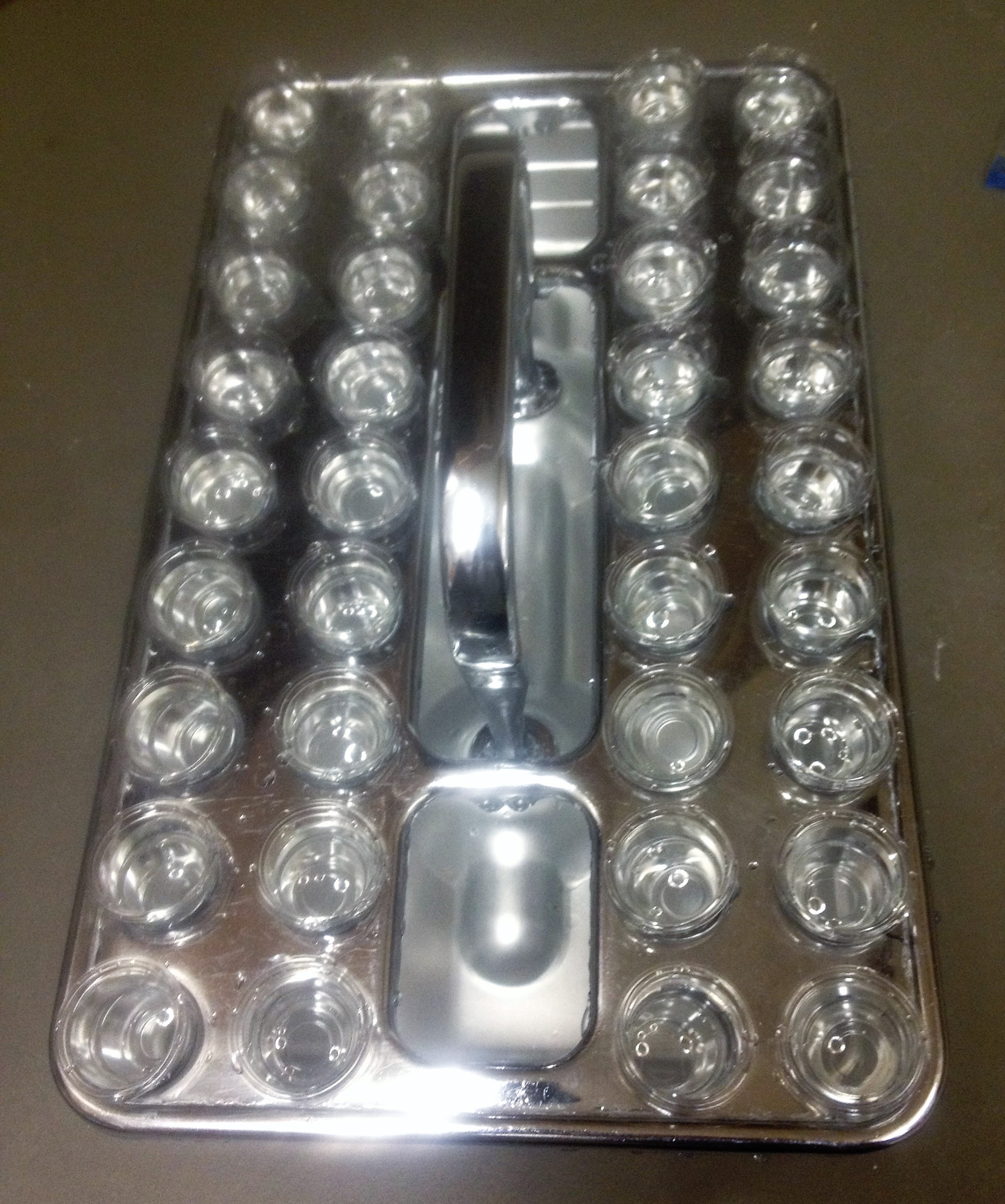
Sacrament trays containing bread and water. The bread is broken and the trays are blessed and passed to the congregation.

In the Church of Jesus Christ of Latter-day Saints (LDS Church), the Holy Sacrament of the Lord's Supper, most often simply referred to as the sacrament, is the ordinance in which participants eat bread and drink water in remembrance of the body and blood of Jesus Christ. Normally, the sacrament is provided every Sunday as part of the sacrament meeting, the primary weekly worship service, in each LDS Church congregation.

Latter-day Saint adherents regard partaking of the sacrament to be a commandment of Jesus Christ; participating in it demonstrates a willingness to remember the atonement of Jesus Christ.

== Sacrament ceremony ==
=== Administration of the sacrament to the congregation ===
In LDS sacrament meetings, the sacrament is passed to members of the congregation after being blessed by a priest from the Aaronic priesthood or a member of the Melchizedek priesthood. The sacrament table is prepared before the meeting begins, usually by teachers, by placing whole slices of bread on trays and filling small individual water cups, which are also held in trays. Both bread and water trays are then covered with white cloth. After introductory prayers, administrative business, and announcements, the sacrament portion of the service begins. It is customary for the congregation to sing a hymn while the bread is uncovered and prepared. The congregation remains seated while the priesthood representatives stand and break bread into bite-sized pieces. The breaking of the bread represents the broken body of Christ. After breaking the bread and the conclusion of the hymn, the priesthood holder kneels and says a set prayer on the broken bread. The bread is passed to the congregation by priesthood holders, usually by deacons. The prayer on the bread is found in the Book of Mormon and Doctrine and Covenants:

"O God, the Eternal Father, we ask thee in the name of thy Son, Jesus Christ, to bless and sanctify this bread to the souls of all those who partake of it; that they may eat in remembrance of the body of thy Son, and witness unto thee, O God, the Eternal Father, that they are willing to take upon them the name of thy Son, and always remember him, and keep his commandments which he has given them, that they may always have his Spirit to be with them. Amen." (Book of Moroni 4:3, Doctrine and Covenants 20:77).

After the bread is passed to the congregation, the bread trays are placed on the table and covered with the white cloth. The water trays are then uncovered and a set prayer is given on the water, which is then passed to the congregation. The prayer on the water indicates that the water represents the shed blood of Christ:

"O God, the Eternal Father, we ask thee, in the name of thy Son, Jesus Christ, to bless and sanctify this [water] to the souls of all those who drink of it, that they may do it in remembrance of the blood of thy Son, which was shed for them; that they may witness unto thee, O God, the Eternal Father, that they do always remember him, that they may have his Spirit to be with them. Amen." (Book of Moroni 5:2, Doctrine and Covenants 20:79).

After the water is passed to the congregation, the water trays are covered with the bread trays for the remainder of the service. The leftover bread and water are discarded.

Latter-day Saints believe the bread and water to be symbols, not the actual body and blood of Christ, and that it is meant for those who have been baptized to "renew their baptismal covenants," although any person of any or no faith is permitted to partake, and it is common for children under the minimum baptismal age to partake as well.

== Changes in sacrament administration ==
Weekly administration of the sacrament in the LDS Church did not begin until the 1850s.

Until the late 1890s or early-20th century, the entire congregation often kneeled during the sacramental prayers, but current practice requires that only the individual giving the prayer kneel. Deacons and teachers did not originally take part in the preparing or passing of the sacrament, a practice which was first adopted in 1898 and was widely implemented in the 1920s or 1930s.

Individual water cups, instead of drinking from a common cup, were introduced in 1911 in response to the Spanish flu.

Passing the sacrament first to the presiding church authority was emphasized in 1946.

=== Temporary adjustments ===
- Occasionally, a lack of access to bread will result in the use of food other than bread in the sacrament. For instance, after the Second World War, members in Switzerland, under heavy food rationing, "were so anxious to partake of the sacrament that they purchased some potato peelings which cost fifty dollars and used these in place of bread."
- On March 12, 2020, due to the COVID-19 pandemic, leaders of the church announced a temporary suspension of all large meetings for members of the church worldwide, including weekly sacrament meetings. Among the instructions given during this period of time was the directive that the bishops of each congregation ensure that those over whom they have stewardship receive the sacrament at least once a month during this period of time.

== Meaning of the sacrament ==
The sacrament is viewed by adherents as a renewal of a member's covenant made at baptism. According to the sacramental prayers, a person eats and drinks in remembrance of the body and blood of Jesus, promises to always remember him, take his name upon them, and keep his commandments. In return, the prayer promises that the participant will always have his spirit to be with them.

The sacrament is considered the most sacred and important element of normal Sabbath day observance and as such is approached by Latter-day Saints with reverence and in a spirit of penitence. Consequently, all who partake of the sacrament are encouraged to examine their own consciences and prayerfully gauge their own worthiness to do so. If they feel unworthy, they are encouraged to refrain from participating in the sacrament until they have properly repented of their sins. Partaking of the sacrament by non-members and unbaptized members is permissible (except in cases where the person has been excommunicated by the church), but the unbaptized are regarded as not having part of the covenant associated with the sacrament.

== See also ==
- Hydroparastatae
