= Rabbinic authority =

Theological and communal authority attributed to rabbinic status

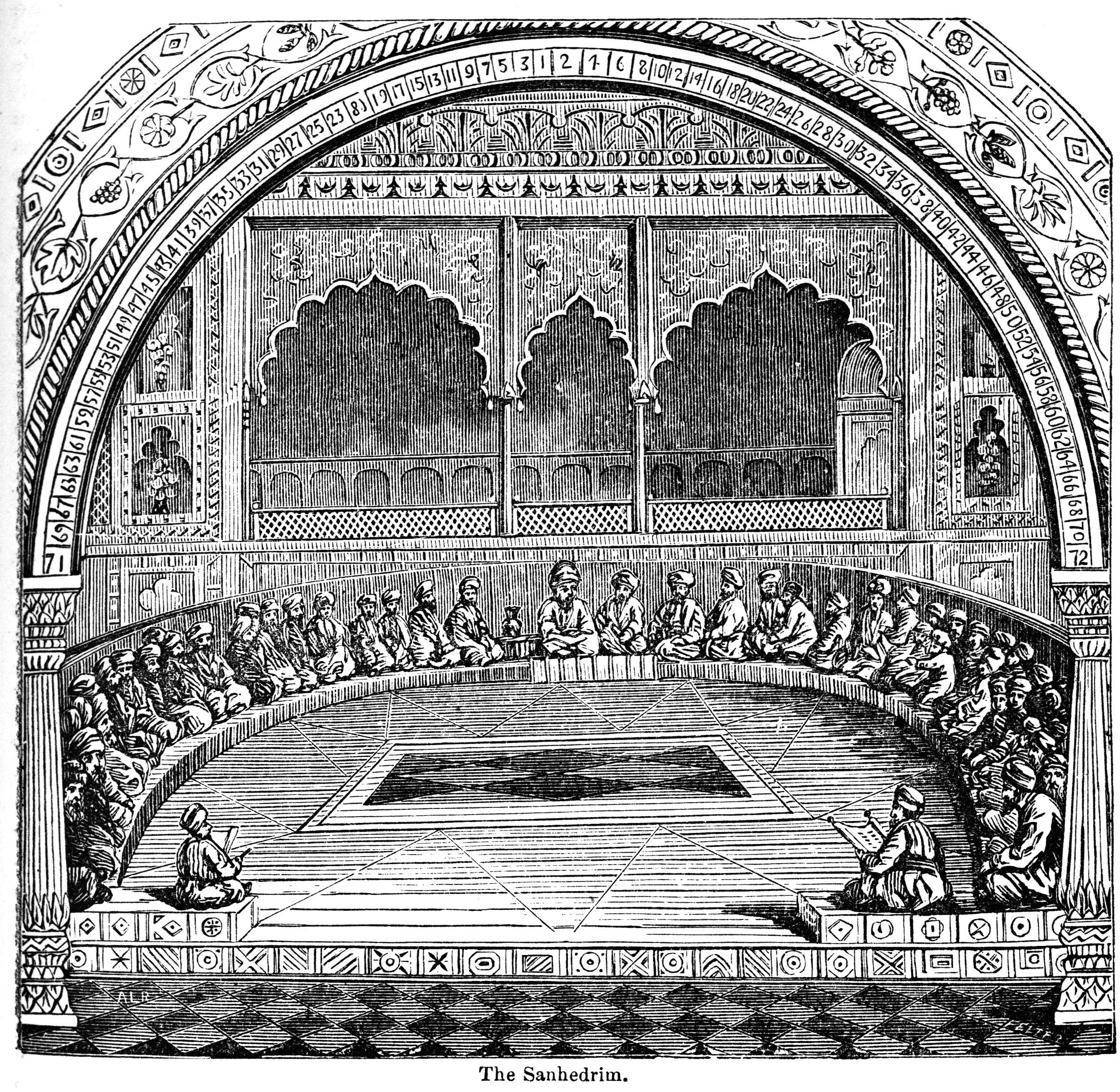
Illustration in 1883 encyclopaedia of the ancient Jewish Sanhedrin

Rabbinic authority in Judaism relates to the theological and communal authority attributed to rabbis and their pronouncements in matters of Jewish law. The extent of rabbinic authority differs by various Jewish groups and denominations throughout history.

The origins of rabbinic authority in Judaism is understood as originally linked to the High Court of ancient Israel and Judah, known as the Sanhedrin. Scholars understand that the extent of rabbinic authority, historically, would have related to areas of Jewish civil, criminal, and ritual law, while rabbinic positions that relate to non-legal matters, such as Jewish philosophy would have been viewed as non-binding.

Rabbinic authority also distinguished the practice of Judaism by the Pharisees (i.e., Rabbinic Judaism) to the religious practice of the Sadducees and the Qumran sect. This concept is linked with the acceptance of rabbinic law, which separates Judaism from other offshoot religions such as Samaritanism and Karaite Judaism.

In contemporary Orthodox Judaism, rabbinic authority is sometimes referred to as da'as Torah (or da'at Torah) (Hebrew: דעת תורה, literally "opinion of Torah"), and the notion of rabbinic authority in this context is often extended beyond the confines of Jewish law, but to a variety of personal, social and political matters.

== Origins ==
=== Biblical injunction ===
One of the commandments in Hebrew Bible relate the establishment of a High Court, known as the Sanhedrin, in the Temple in Jerusalem. In this context, there is a biblical injunction against straying from the rulings of the Sanhedrin. This precept is referred to as "lo tasur" (Hebrew: לא תסור) and is sourced from the Book of Deuteronomy which states:

According to the law which they will teach you and according to the judgment which they will tell you, you shall do; you should not turn aside (lo tasur) from the things that they will declare to you neither to the right nor to the left.

— Deuteronomy 17:11

According to Jewish scholars, only when the majority of the Sanhedrin (or another centralized court) that represents the entire Jewish people formally votes does the Biblical injunction of lo tasur apply. Additionally, this precept only applies to the early rabbinic positions from the era of the Mishna and Talmud, but not to the rabbis of later generations. Community leaders similarly share some of the rights of the Sanhedrin, but this applies only where the majority of the community accepts their authority. Individuals who are not community members are not required to follow the decisions of community leaders. The medieval rabbinic authority, Moses Maimonides, lists the injunction of lo tasur as the 312th biblical commandment (of the 613 commandments). Aside from the injunction of lo tasur there is a separate Biblical commandment to respect and honor Torah scholars, even if one disagrees with their views.

The authority founded in rabbinic law is framed in context of the biblical commandments (mitzvot) and termed as commandments as well. These are listed as "biblical and rabbinic commandments" (mitzvot de'oraita and mitzvot derabanan). This new category distinguished the rabbinic authority of the rabbis from the laws of the Qumranite and Sadducean groups of ancient Israel. And while the rabbinic commandments are presented as authoritative, the rabbis acknowledge that biblical commandments override rabbinic commandments.

=== Treatment in Talmud ===
Diverging historical views on the actual extent of rabbinic authority in the Talmudic period and are described in terms of maximalism and minimalism. Maximalists view rabbinic authority as extending over Jewish religious and civic life as it existed under Roman rule. Minimalists view rabbinic authority under Roman rule as greatly limited with the rabbis unable to enforce their rulings. Additionally, some scholars suggest that Talmudic rabbis produced many texts concerning the destroyed Jewish Temple which in turn bolstered rabbinic authority in the post-Temple period.

In Jewish sources, the topic of rabbinic authority appears frequently. Beyond the general topic of the authority of the Sanhedrin, other discussions also arise. Rabbinic authority is treated in the Babylonian Talmud as occurring, at times, in opposition to divine authority. This conflict appears in a well-known text in the Babylonian Talmud (Baba Metzia 59b) regarding the sage Eliezer ben Hurcanus who declared Oven of Akhnai to be ritually pure against the majority view. According to the passage, neither Rabbi Eliezer's attempts to use reason nor his use of miracles and divine voices are accepted by the rabbis. This passage is understood as the right of rabbinic authority over both the minority opinion as well as over divine authority (or that the Torah is "not in Heaven"). There is some additional deliberation based on readings of the Jerusalem Talmud and the Sifre as to whether the obligation is to obey just the original Sanhedrin in Jerusalem or subsequent rabbinical courts that are constituted in a similar fashion such as the Council of Jamnia (known in rabbinical texts as the Beth Din of Yavne). The Talmud also offers scenarios where rabbinic authority is disregarded, in this case where the congregation are certain of the court's error. Treatment of this topic is taken up at length in the Talmudic tractate of Horayot. An additional concept is the instance when a Jewish elder refuses to concede to the majority opinion, such an elder is termed zaken mamre ("a rebellious elder"). A concept similar to the notion of rabbinic authority is the value of placing faith in the Jewish sages (emunat chachamim). This topic is listed as the twenty-third of a list of forty-eight attributes through which the wisdom of the Jewish tradition is acquired.

=== Basis for authority ===
The practical basis for rabbinic authority involves the acceptance of the rabbinic individual and their scholarly credentials. In practical terms, Jewish communities and individuals commonly proffer allegiance to the authority of the rabbi they have chosen. Such a rabbinic leader is sometimes called the "Master of the Locale" (mara d'atra). Jewish individuals may acknowledge the authority of other rabbis but will defer legal decisions to the mara d'atra. Rabbinic authority may be derived from scholarly achievements within a meritocratic system. Rabbinic authority may be viewed as based on credentials in the form of the institutionally approved ordination (semikhah). This approval and authority allows rabbis to engage in the legal process of Jewish ritual (halakha) and to prescribe legal rulings.

=== Challenges in the medieval era ===
In the medieval era and in the time period that immediately followed in the early modern period, there arose three major challenges to rabbinic authority that led to fissures, divisions, and resistance to the power which the rabbis previously claimed. The first major challenge of this period arose from the rise of rationalism and its impact on Jewish theology. The second major challenge involved the aftermath of the Spanish expulsion and the forced conversions from that period that occurred to conversos and their descendants in Europe and the New World. The third challenge involved the popularity of Jewish mysticism and the events that surrounded the advent of Sabbateanism.

== Orthodox Judaism and da'as Torah ==
In some communities within Orthodox Judaism, rabbinic authority is viewed as extensive, according to which Orthodox Jews should seek the input of rabbinic scholars not just on matters of Jewish law, but on all important life matters, on the grounds that knowledge of the Torah aids everything in life. The linkage of the Orthodox notion of rabbinic authority is known as da'as Torah and is a contested matter and the views are partly split along communal lines within Orthodoxy. Rabbinic leaders from Haredi and Hasidic communities view the concept as inextricably linked to the centuries of Jewish tradition. Within modern Orthodox Judaism, many rabbis and scholars view the matter as a modern development that can be traced to changes in Jewish communal life in the nineteenth century. Within Orthodoxy, the topic of religious authority also significantly relates to the notion of stringiencies relating to Jewish law and custom. The concept of da'as Torah may have originated as an extension of the role of the Rebbe in Hasidic Judaism. The espoused belief in the Haredi branch of Orthodox Judaism is that Jews, both individually and collectively, should seek out the views of the prominent religious scholars. And the views of rabbis apply to matters of Jewish law as well as matters in all aspects of community life. Although the authority of rabbinic views concerning extralegal matters is not universally accepted in modern Orthodoxy, other factions of Orthodoxy lobby for these rabbinic stances to be considered by their moderate coreligionists.

While the notion of da'as Torah is viewed by Haredi rabbis as a long-established tradition within the Judaism, modern Orthodox scholars argue that the Haredi claim is a revisionist one. According to modern Orthodox scholars, although the term "da'as Torah" has been used in the past, the connotations of absolute rabbinic authority under this banner occurs only in the decades that follow the establishment of the Agudas Yisrael party in Eastern Europe. Additionally, Orthodox scholars who elaborate the Haredi position are careful to distinguish between rabbinic authority in legal versus extralegal matters. Whereas in declaring matters of Jewish law rabbinic authorities are required to render decisions based on precedents, sources, and Talmudic principles of analysis, a rabbinic authority has greater latitude when declaring da'as Torah than when defining a halakhic opinion. While a halakhic opinion requires legal justification from recognized sources, simple da'as Torah is regarded as being of a more subtle nature and requires no clear legal justification or explicit grounding in earlier sources. Thereby, different authorities may offer diametrically opposed opinions based on their own understanding. Some scholars argue that with the rise of modernity, the wider availability of secular knowledge, and a reduction of commitment to religion, members of traditional Jewish communities raised challenges to the leadership role of the rabbis. The Haredi position of da'as Torah is possibly a counter reaction to the changes linked to modernity. This counter reaction also may give way to a view that the rabbinic authority is of an infallible nature. According to other scholars, the notion of da'as Torah is specifically linked to the rise of the Agudat Yisrael political party during the interwar period in Poland. Additionally, it may have arisen as part of the Haredi rejectionist stance to modernity, in opposition the approach of modern Orthodox Jewish leaders.

=== Applications ===
- Israeli politics — The concept of rabbinic authority as presented in the modern State of Israel contains a political dimension. Rabbinic authority as expressed in Israeli politics varies by religious party and faction. The expression of the da'as Torah concept is most strongly found in the use of a rabbinic council that guides the Haredi political parties in Israel. The influence of rabbinic authority is somewhat lessened in the moderate faction of the Religious Zionist parties. Some researchers view secular media in Israel as posing a unique challenge to Orthodox rabbinic authority over their communities and political parties. To mitigate this challenge, Orthodox communities have formed media outlets run exclusively for Orthodox populations.
- Impact on health — Mental health professionals who treat ultra-Orthodox patients have encountered the challenge of individuals who typically resort to rabbinical authority to advise on a range of personal matters. These mental health workers advocate for a joint effort in treating such patients as the mental health worker cannot advise regarding religious matters but neither can rabbinic authorities dispense health advice on complex issues. One common example of mental health where this dilemma is expressed is with regards to obsessive–compulsive disorder (OCD). It was also estimated that a significant proportion of ultra-Orthodox patients seeking treatment had first sought spiritual responses from rabbis, making their first treatment choice to be an appeal to rabbinic authority and wisdom. In the case of OCD, the discussion of the disorder appears in modern rabbinical responsa (she'elot u-teshuvot).
- Internet-based rabbinic authority — With the advent of the internet, rabbis have been sought out for rabbinic advice. However, the online setting of seeking internet-based authority poses the risk where the typical respect conferred upon rabbis is diminished. The increased tendency for petitioners to respond to rabbinic decisions on internet-based communication platforms may inadvertently lead to disrespecting rabbinic authority.

== Conservative Judaism ==
In Conservative Judaism, the injunction of lo tasur is generally understood as solely referring to the authority of the Sanhedrin Court in Jerusalem and therefore does not apply to later rabbinic authorities for either their rulings or customs. However, Conservative rabbis also understand that the injunction of lo tasur may follow two alternative applications in relation to the question of majority opinions in Jewish law. The first stance rests on the metaphysical belief that there is divinely bestowed authority on the majority decisions produced by the rabbinical court. The second stance relies on a theological stance regarding the form of transmission of Torah in the post-prophetic age and which allows for a lesser degree of authority to be associated with the rabbinical majority. For both of these views, there are implications that concern the rights of rabbinical minorities and of Jewish individuals who are not of the same view as the majority of the rabbinical court. And while each view can be maintained within Conservative Judaism and associated with the emphasis on the use of rabbinic majorities, it is argued that the second view is mostly aligned with the tradition of the Conservative movement that allows for greater powers for the rabbinic minority.

=== Gendered authority ===
Since the 1980s, Conservative Judaism has ordained women rabbis and admitted them into the Conservative rabbinate where they serve a full range of rabbinic callings. This has led some scholars to consider how gender relates to rabbinic authority. An initial presumption among members of the movement's theological institution was that gender inequality within the rabbinate would cease to be a major issue once greater numbers of women would receive ordination. That perspective would align with a view that most aspects of rabbinic authority in Conservative Judaism would be similar for both male and female rabbis. However, research that examined the barriers to women gaining formal positions in congregations has lent itself to a more critical view of the gendered barriers for women rabbis to be recognized as rabbinic authorities.

== Hasidic Judaism ==
In Hasidic circles, a Rebbe or Tzaddik is often regarded as having extraordinary spiritual powers and is sought for personal advice in all pursuits of life by his followers. The devotion to the Tzaddik involves setting aside the Hasid's intellect and reason as a precondition for a blessing of abundance Another factor in the faith in the Tzaddik involves the role of the Tzaddik as the mediator between God and the Hasid. Faith in the power of the Tzaddik was common to all branches of the Hasidic movement with the words and advise of the Tzaddik viewed by the Hasidim as of the same stature of prophecy and from which the Hasid may not deviate. Nevertheless, there are differences between Hasidic groups on the degree of resistance on the part of the Tzaddik with Rabbi Shneur Zalman of Liadi of Chabad and Rabbi Nachman of Breslov objecting to their followers request for blessings for material success.

== See also ==
- List of religious titles in Judaism
