= Voice of God =

Religious concept

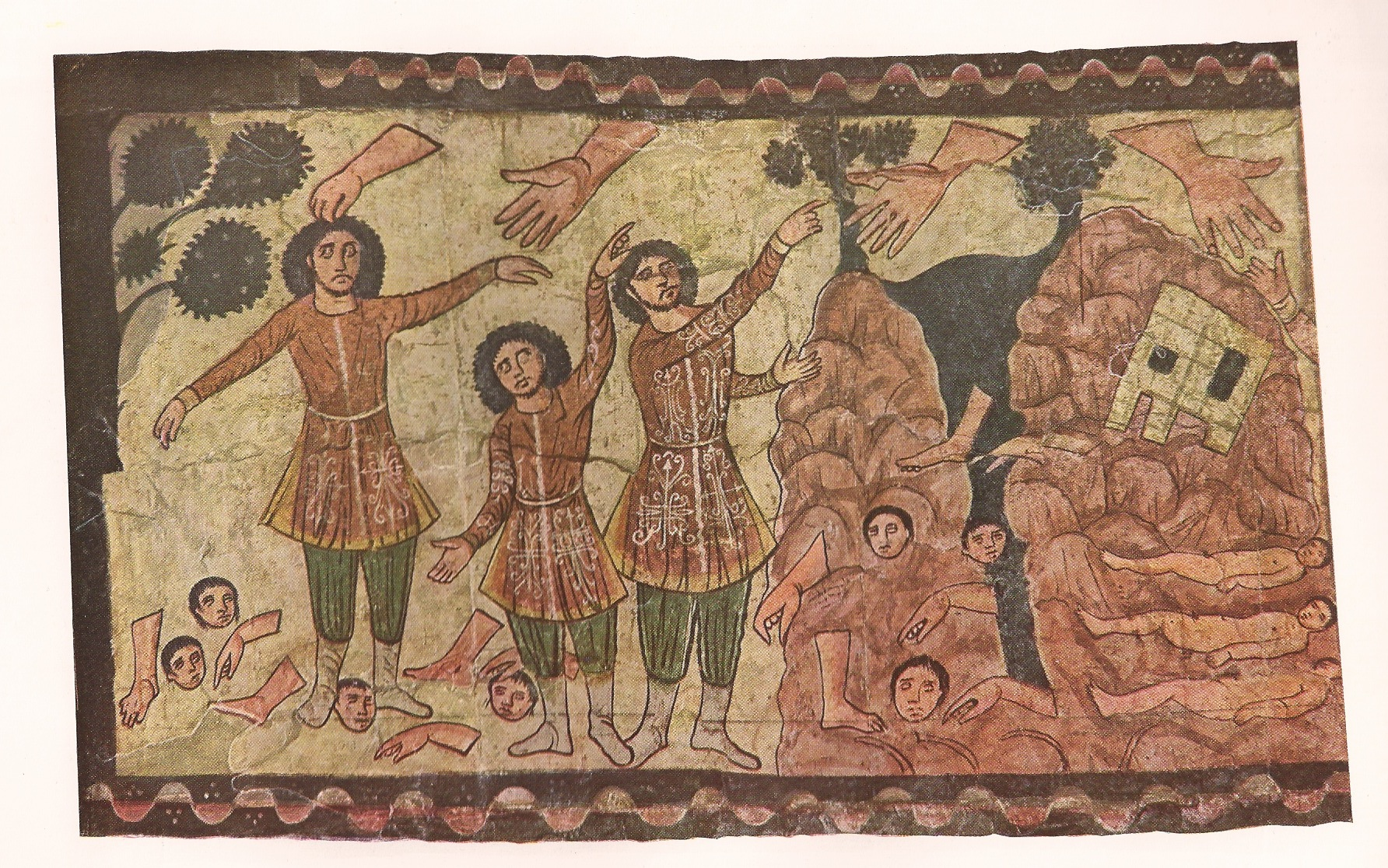
Ezekiel hears the voice, represented by the Hand of God, Dura-Europos synagogue, 3rd century CE.

In the Abrahamic religions, the voice of God is a communication from God to human beings through sound with no known physical source.

In Rabbinic Judaism, such a voice is known as a bat kol (Hebrew: בַּת קוֹל baṯ qōl, literally "daughter of voice"), a "heavenly or divine voice which proclaims God's will or judgment". It differed from prophecy in that God had a close relationship with the prophet, while the bat kol could be heard by any individual or group regardless of their level of connection to God.

== Hebrew Bible ==
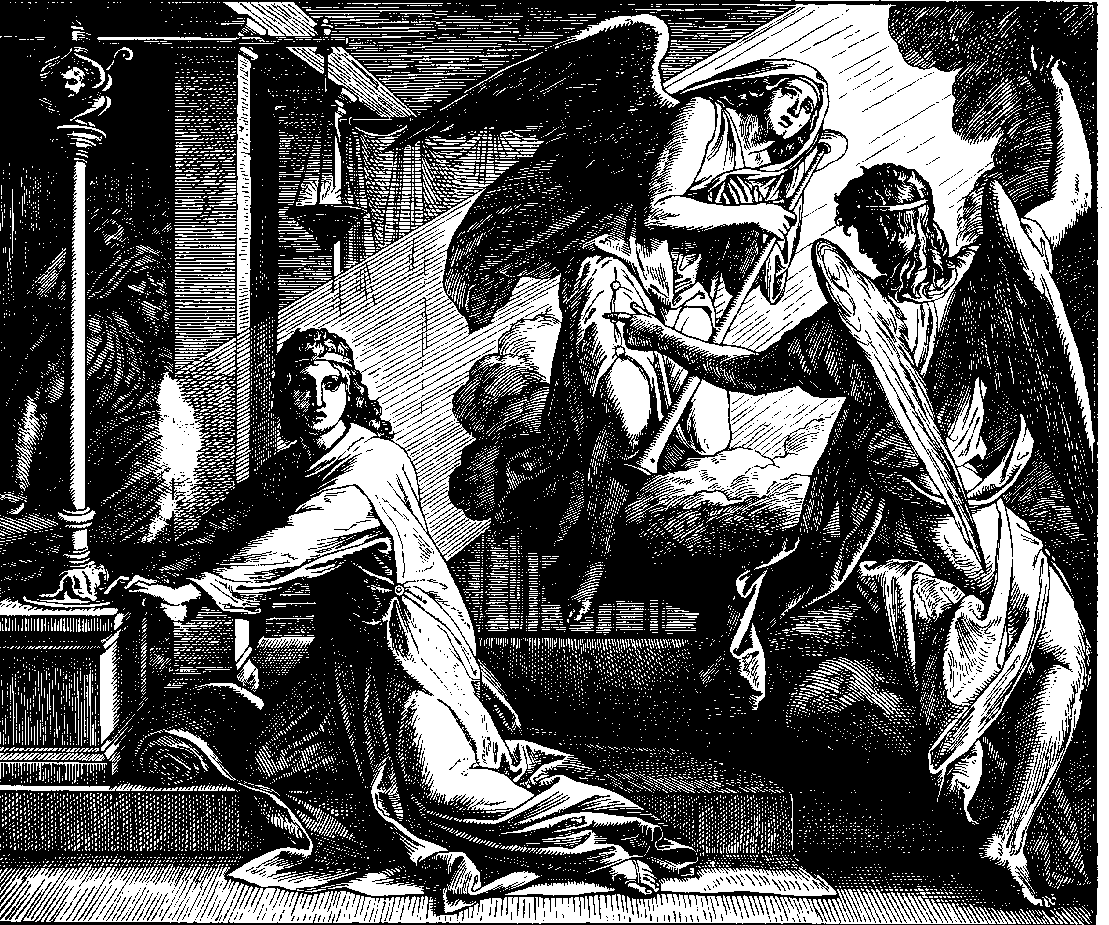
God calls Samuel at night in this 1860 woodcut by Julius Schnorr von Karolsfeld

In the Hebrew Bible, the characteristic attributes of the voice of God are the invisibility of the speaker and a certain remarkable quality in the sound, regardless of its strength or weakness.

A sound proceeding from some invisible source was considered a heavenly voice, since the mass revelation at Sinai, as recorded in Deuteronomy 4:12 and referenced in Psalm 50:6, was given in that way: "Ye heard the voice of the words, but saw no similitude; only ye heard a voice". In the Deuteronomic narrative, the manifestation of God to the Israelites occurs exclusively through auditory means rather than visual. Even the prophet Ezekiel, who is recorded as the recipient of many visions, "heard a voice of one that spoke". Similarly, Elijah recognized God by a "still, small voice", and a voice addressed him. God's voice is recorded as coming from the heavens, from Jerusalem, and Zion, with God's voice heard in thunder and the roar of the sea, as well.

== In later Jewish sources ==
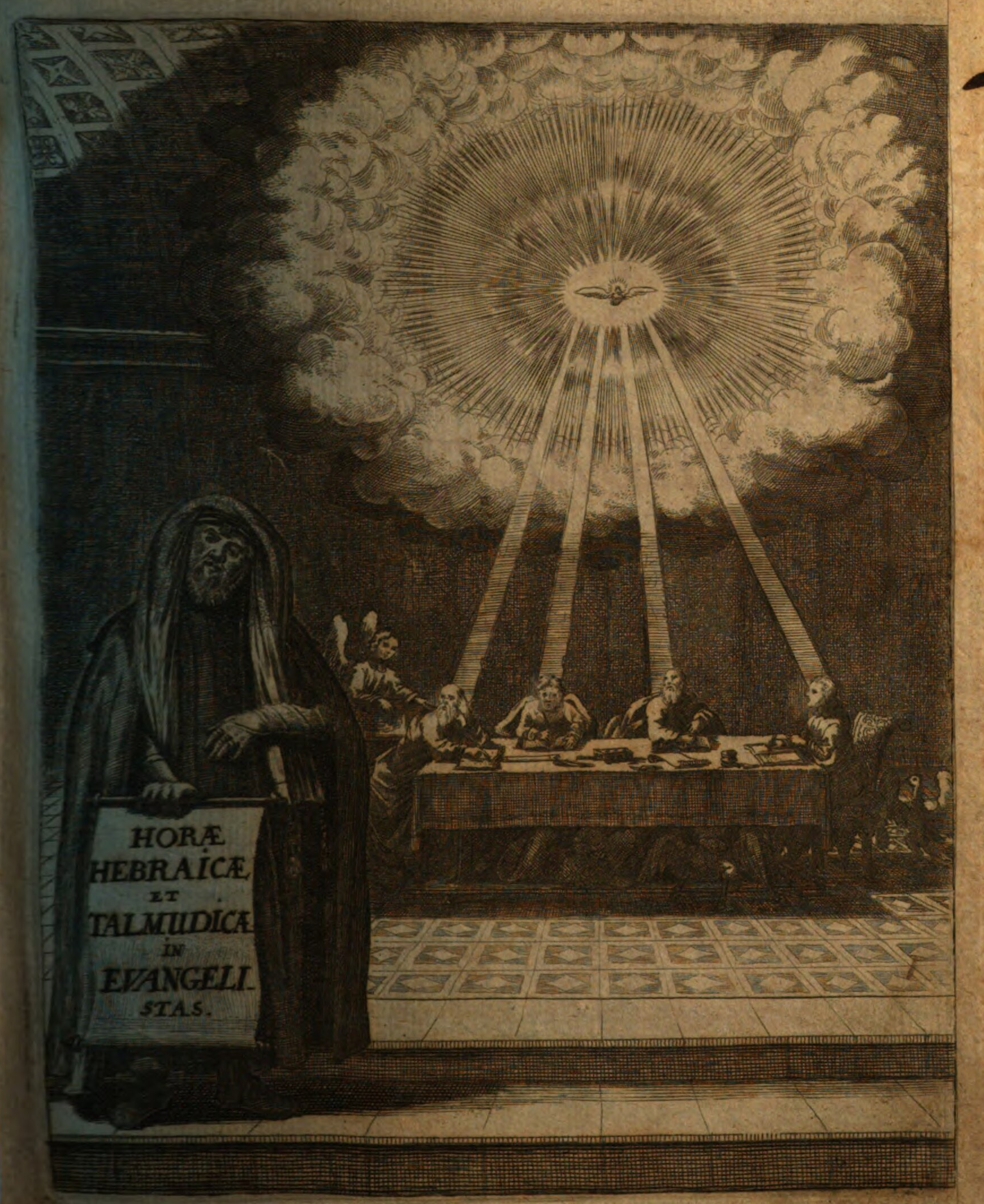
Image of Divine Voice in Lightfoot, John (1675) Horae Hebraicae et Talmudicae In Qvatuor Evangelistas

The phrase bat kol appears in many Talmudic stories to represent a heavenly or divine voice to human beings. It proclaims God's will or judgment, deeds, and commandments to individuals or to a number of persons, rulers, communities, and even to whole nations.

=== Origin of the name ===
The phrase bat kol literally means "daughter of voice"—that is, a "small" voice—to distinguish it from an ordinary voice (קוֹל, 'voice'). The phrase also appears the midrash Shir HaShirim Rabbah: "As oil has no bat kol [that is, gives no sound], so Israel is not heard of in this world..." In contrast, Exodus Rabbah 29, another midrashic work, implies that God's revelatory voice is actually not a bat kol:

Yohanan said, 'When God revealed the Torah, no sparrow chirped, no bird flew, no ox lowed;'... 'These words,' says Simeon ben Lakish, as follows: If one man calls to another, his voice has a bat kol; but the voice proceeding from God has no bat kol... For if a sound had been heard, the priests would have said: 'Baal has answered us.' On Sinai God caused the whole world to be silent, in order that mankind might know there is none besides Him.

Divine communication was also noted as vocal in Daniel 4:28 ("There fell a voice from heaven..."). Occasionally in the Talmud, God's voice is given simply as kol (voice). In the Aramaic versions of the Hebrew Bible and some midrashic and Talmudic sources, heavenly revelation is introduced variably with a formula: "A voice fell from heaven", "came from heaven", "was heard", or "proceeded from heaven".

=== Its nature ===
The bat kol was considered to be divine in origin. In the narrative in Berachot 3a, the equivalent of "God" is used instead of "bat kol"; not infrequently, God, when using the bat kol, is represented as speaking in the first person. Sometimes bat kol is identified with the Holy Spirit.

Despite being identified with the Holy Spirit or God directly, the bat kol differed essentially from prophecy. The Holy Spirit was said to rest upon the prophets, and the conversations between them were personal and intimate. Those who heard the bat kol had no relation whatever to the Holy Spirit. The prophets possessed the Holy Spirit; in contrast, the bat kol could not be possessed: God spoke through it as he did through the prophets. For this reason, the bat kol addressed not only righteous individuals but also sinners, common people, or multitudes, both in the Land of Israel and the diaspora. Prophecy was a gift of which the prophet and his generation had to be worthy to receive. From this point of view, the bat kol was explained as a lesser gift to Israel than prophecy, but not, as some said, as a lower degree of prophecy.

=== Content and examples ===
The bat kol revealed the divine will in commonly accessible language, usually in the form of a passage from the Hebrew Bible. According to rabbinical tradition, the bat kol coexisted with prophecy (that is, when the Holy Spirit rested upon Israel and Babylonia). The bat kol spoke to Abraham, Esau, the Israelites at the Sea of Reeds, Moses and Aaron, Saul, David, Solomon, Manasseh of Judah, Nebuchadnezzar, the inhabitants of Sheol, the Rechabites, Haman, and those feasting with Ahasuerus. The bat kol is frequently connected with Moses's death.

Rabbinic sources state that "after the death of the last three prophets—Haggai, Zechariah, and Malachi—the Holy Spirit departed from Israel; but the bat kol was still heard". Many stories of its later appearance appear in rabbinic literature. A bat kol decided between the Houses of Hillel and Shammai in favor of the House of Hillel, according to a Talmudic sugya in Eruvin 13b in which the bat kol said, "Elu ve-elu ('these and those are the words of the living God')". Shimon bar Yochai emerged from his stay in a cave only after receiving permission from a bat kol. In the Oven of Akhnai story, a bat kol declared that the halakha was in accordance with Rabbi Eliezer. Yet, the other rabbis rejected this declaration on the grounds that the "Torah is not in Heaven". It was said that whenever there is no law (Halakha), no high priesthood, and no Sanhedrin, a bat kol cries: "Strengthen ye the weak hands".

Notably, the rabbinical conception of bat kol sprang up in the period of the decline of Jewish prophecy and flourished in the period of extreme traditionalism. Where the gift of prophecy was believed to be lacking—perhaps even because of said lack—there grew an inordinate desire for special divine manifestations. Often, a voice from Heaven was looked for to clear up matters of doubt and even to decide between conflicting interpretations of the law. So strong had this tendency become that Rabbi Joshua (c. 100 CE) felt it necessary to oppose it and insist upon the supremacy and sufficiency of the written law.

Josephus relates that John Hyrcanus (135–104 BCE) heard a voice while offering a burnt sacrifice in the Temple in Jerusalem, which Josephus expressly interprets as the voice of God.

== In Christianity ==
In the New Testament mention of "a voice from heaven" occurs in the following passages: Matt 3:17; Mark 1:11; Luke 3:22 (at the baptism of Jesus); Matt 17:5; Mark 9:7; Luke 9:35 (at the transfiguration); John 12:28 (shortly before the Passion); Acts 9:4; Acts 22:7; Acts 26:14 (conversion of Paul), and Acts 10:13, Acts 10:15 (instruction of Peter concerning the clean and unclean).

These passages show a conception of the nature and means of divine revelation that is distinctly different from the Old Testament descriptions, for even in the Old Testament passages where mention is made of the voice from heaven, all that is really essential to the revelation is already present, at least in principle, without the audible voice.

Christian scholars interpreted Bath Kol as the Jews' replacement for the great prophets when, "after the death of Malachi, the spirit of prophecy wholly ceased in Israel" (taking the name to refer to its being "the daughter" of the main prophetic "voice").

== Other media ==
The generic term "voice of God" is commonly used in theatrical productions and staging, and refers to any anonymous, disembodied voice used to deliver general messages to the audience. Examples may include speaker introductions, audience directions and performer substitutions.

The origin of the "Voice of God" narration style was most probably in Time Inc's "March of Time" news-radio and news-film series, for which Orson Welles was an occasional voice-over actor, and was subsequently duplicated in Welles' "Citizen Kane" News On The March sequence (the first reel of the film), much to the delight of Henry R. Luce, Time's president.

Psychiatrist Thomas Szasz wrote in The Second Sin (1973): "If you talk to God, you are praying; if God talks to you, you have schizophrenia. If the dead talk to you, you are a spiritualist; if God talks to you, you are a schizophrenic."

== Nicknames ==
- Bob Sheppard, public-address announcer for New York Yankees baseball games from 1951 to 2007 and for New York Giants football games from 1956 to 2005
- Don LaFontaine, narrator of many film trailers
- John Facenda, Philadelphia newscaster who narrated several NFL Films Productions from 1966 to 1984
- Morgan Freeman, actor, narrator of films and a portrayer of God in Bruce Almighty and Evan Almighty
- Don Pardo, television personality and former announcer on Saturday Night Live

== See also ==
- Voice from heaven in Shia Islamic eschatology

== Sources ==
- This page draws text from 'The Mirror of Literature, Amusement, and Instruction', Vol. 10, Issue 273, September 15, 1827, a text now in the public domain.
- Humphrey Prideaux, The Old and New Testament connected in the history of the Jews, 1851.
- Thomas de Quincey, Narrative And Miscellaneous Papers, Vol. II.
- Free Prophecy, The Voice of God

This article incorporates text from the International Standard Bible Encyclopedia article "Bath Kol", a publication now in the public domain.
