= Elu ve-elu, these and those are the words of the living God (Eruvin 13b) =

Talmudic passage

Elu ve-elu is a principle in Jewish thought and a climactic line from an important sugya or passage in the Babylonian Talmud (Eruvin 13b). When facing two contradictory opinions, the divine response was that "elu ve-elu (these and those) are the words of the living God." The principle is pertinent to the Talmudic understanding of intra-rabbinic disputes (makhloket) as well as rabbinic epistemology, though it has become known in recent years as a warrant for non-Orthodox movements as they make changes in their Judaisms.

This line of Talmud is among the most mentioned in rabbinic literature: Simon-Shoshan reported more than 14,000 in database of sources.

== Context ==
The Talmudic passage presupposes that readers are familiar with the sharp rivalry between two ancient rabbinic academies, the Houses of Hillel and Shammai. Besides favoring the House of Hillel, the sugya delves into rabbinic law for the use of a sukkah, a ritual booth for the annual festival of Sukkot, and speculates on the value of human existence.

While there is little external literary or archaeological evidence, the historical context for the Eilu v'eilu sugya seems to be that Beit Hillel was strong but not always the defining halakhic decision.

== Text ==
The main section of the Eruvin passage is as follow, with the Steinsaltz elucidation for the Talmud text in bold:

Rabbi Abba said that Shmuel said: For three years Beit Shammai and Beit Hillel disagreed. These said: The halakha is in accordance with our opinion, and these said: The halakha is in accordance with our opinion. Ultimately, the Voice of God (bat kol) emerged and proclaimed: Both these and those (elu v'elu) are the words of the living God. However, the halakha is in accordance with the opinion of Beit Hillel. The Gemara asks: Since both these and those are the words of the living God, why were Beit Hillel privileged to have the halakha established in accordance with their opinion? The reason is that they were agreeable and forbearing, showing restraint when affronted, and when they taught the halakha they would teach both their own statements and the statements of Beit Shammai. Moreover, when they formulated their teachings and cited a dispute, they prioritized the statements of Beit Shammai to their own statements, in deference to Beit Shammai. As in the mishna that we learned: In the case of one whose head and most of his body were in the sukkah, but his table was in the house, Beit Shammai deem this sukka invalid; and Beit Hillel deem it valid. Beit Hillel said to Beit Shammai: Wasn't there an incident in which the Elders of Beit Shammai and the Elders of Beit Hillel went to visit Rabbi Yoḥanan ben HaḤoranit, and they found him sitting with his head and most of his body in the sukkah, but his table was in the house? Beit Shammai said to them: From there do you seek to adduce a proof? Those visitors, too, said to him: If that was the manner in which you were accustomed to perform the mitzva, you have never fulfilled the mitzva of sukkah in all your days. It is apparent from the phrasing of the mishna that when the Sages of Beit Hillel related that the Elders of Beit Shammai and the Elders of Beit Hillel visited Rabbi Yoḥanan ben HaḤoranit, they mentioned the Elders of Beit Shammai before their own Elders.

== Commentaries ==
The medieval Talmud scholar Rashi gives an example, from a debate over the Shema (Berakhot 110b), when Beit Hillel taught -- and disputed -- the specific statements of Beit Shammai.

This passage, along with The Oven of Akhnai, are where Talmudic literature examines the authority of a divine voice (bat kol). With Elu ve-Elu, the Tosafot say that divine intervention was accepted only because at that juncture, the rabbis were unsure whether a controversy should be resolved in favor of "the larger school of Bet Hillel or the more profound thinkers of Bet Shammai (Tosafot to Eruvin 6b S.V. כאן)".

== A Second Text ==
There is another passage in the Talmud that has a divine voice saying the same phrase, "these and those are the words of the living God." It is at Gittin 6b, where Rabbis Evyatar and Yonatan disagree about why the Levite got angry at his concubine. (She is later raped and murdered in Judges 19.) The Talmud states:

Rabbi Evyatar says: He found her responsible for a fly in the food that she prepared for him, while Rabbi Yonatan says: He found her responsible for a hair [nima]. And Rabbi Evyatar found Elijah the prophet and said to him: What is the Holy One, Blessed be He, doing now? Elijah said to him: He is currently engaged in studying the episode of the Levite's concubine in Gibeah. Rabbi Evyatar asked him: What is He saying about it? Elijah said to him that God is saying the following: Evyatar, My son, says this and Yonatan, My son, says that. It is seen here that God saw fit to cite the statement of Rabbi Evyatar. Rabbi Evyatar said to him: God forbid, is there uncertainty before Heaven? Doesn't God know what happened? Why does He mention both opinions? Elijah said to him: Both these and those are the words of the living God, i.e., both incidents happened. The incident occurred in the following manner: He found a fly in his food and did not take umbrage, and later he found a hair and took umbrage.

This incident is seldom mentioned in contemporary discussions of Elu ve-elu, possibly due to the trivial level of the debate or the seriousness of the Gibeah tragedy.

== Pluralism ==
A number of Jewish thinkers consider the Elu v'elu sugya as a warrant for a kind of rabbinic pluralism, though the nature of this pluralism is contested. A common view is that rabbinic law recognizes logically incompatible or contradictory positions, while also consonant with God. These thinkers include Daniel Boyarin, Menachem Fisch, Steven D. Fraade, and Robert Cover.

Simon-Shoshan points out that even if the first part is pluralistic, the second part seems monist insofar it declares the law with Beit Hillel. Another distinction, he states, is that the first part (i.e., both the word of God) is a claim to authenticity, while the second part (i.e., the law is with Beit Hillel), is a normative claim.

Avi Sagi offers an extended analysis of the sugya in The Open Canon: On the Meaning of Halakhic Discourse. On the monism view, he considers the validity of decisions and meaning of disputes relative to the divine. On pluralism, Sagi posits several models for revelation -- realistic, anthropological, and authoritative. (in a 1994 paper, Sagi's three-part typology was metaphysical, anthropological, and authority.) Sagi then discusses a "harmonic outlook" that sublates the apparent contradiction in positions (of Beit Hillel and Beit Shammai), with chapters on the "union of opposites" and "reality knows no opposites." In Sagi's view, halakhah can be examined as a discourse with potential, embedded values, such as innovation and toleration.

The Eruvin sugya is a composition, after the amoraic period, associated with the Savoraim's editing of the Talmud. For this reason, Boyarin and Azzan Yadin-Israel view its pluralism as a late development. Conversely, Simon-Shoshan sees precursors in tannaitic literature, from the period of the Mishnah, such as Hillel and Shammai texts in Eduyot, Hagigah 2:9 in the Tosefta (about divisiveness in generations after Hillel and Shammai), Sotah 7:12 that grants authenticity to competing positions, and a repeated passage that, like the Elu ve-elu sugya, states that Beit Hillel alone is correct yet ends by endorsing those who follow either one or the other. The next stage are four "These and those..." passages in the Jerusalem Talmud.

In seeking comparative texts from the medieval period, Rosensweig cautions against associating the Elu v'Elu sugya with the medieval philosophical principle of a Double Truth Doctrine, by the Averroist school.

== Other religious and academic responses ==
Joshua Halberstam treats the Elu ve-Elu sugya as way to approach the debate, in epistemology, between holding steadfast to one's beliefs or to pursue conciliatory options.
