= Diocesan bishop =

Administrator in charge of large districts in Christian denominations

A diocesan bishop, within various Christian traditions, is a bishop or archbishop in pastoral charge of a diocese or archdiocese. In relation to other bishops, a diocesan bishop may be a suffragan, a metropolitan (if an archbishop) or a primate. They may also hold various other positions such as being a cardinal or patriarch.

Titular bishops in the Roman Catholic Church may be assistant bishops with special faculties, coadjutor bishops (these bishops are now named as coadjutors of the dioceses they will lead, and not as titular bishops), auxiliary bishops, nuncios or similar papal diplomats (usually archbishops), officials of the Roman Curia (usually for bishops as heads or deputies of departments who are not previous ordinaries), etc. They may also hold other positions such as cardinal. The see of titular bishop is only nominal, not pastoral- meaning he does not exercise final authority as the head bishop (the ordinary), or have the right to automatically succeed the aforementioned individual (the coadjutor), over an existing diocese or archdiocese or their Eastern rite equivalents, (arch-)eparchies. Titular bishops may be active or retired. Occasionally, as a priest, they may have been given a titular bishopric or archbishopric as an honor by the Pope, similar to when he names some cardinals.

== Roman Catholic Church ==
A diocesan bishop — in the Catholic Church — is entrusted with the pastoral care of a local Church (diocese), over which he holds ordinary jurisdiction. He is responsible for teaching, governing, and sanctifying the faithful of his diocese, sharing these duties with the priests and deacons who serve under him.

=== Coadjutor bishop ===
The Holy See can appoint a coadjutor bishop for a diocese. He has special faculties and the right of succession.

=== Auxiliary bishop ===
The diocesan bishop may request that the Holy See appoint one or more auxiliary bishops to assist him in his duties.

=== Bishop emeritus ===
When a diocesan bishop or auxiliary bishop retires, the word "emeritus" is added to his former title, i.e., "Archbishop Emeritus of ...", "Bishop Emeritus of ...", or "Auxiliary Bishop Emeritus of ...". Examples of usage are: "The Most Reverend (or Right Reverend) John Jones, Bishop Emeritus of Anytown"; and "His Eminence Cardinal James Smith, Archbishop Emeritus of Anycity". The term "Bishop Emeritus" of a particular see can apply to several people, if the first lives long enough. The sees listed in the 2007 Annuario Pontificio as having more than one bishop emeritus included Zárate-Campana, Villavicencio, Versailles, and Uruguaiana. There were even three Archbishops Emeriti of Taipei. The same suffix was applied to the Bishop of Rome, Pope Emeritus Benedict XVI, on his retirement.

== Eastern Orthodox ==
Archiereus (Ancient Greek: ἀρχιερεύς; Russian: архиерей, romanized: arkhierei) is a Greek term for diocesan bishop, when considered as the culmination of the priesthood. It is used in the liturgical books of the Eastern Orthodox Church and Eastern Catholic Church, for those services which correspond to the pontifical services of the Roman Rite. The term is distinct from protoiereus (archpriest), the highest ecclesiastical rank which a married priest may attain in the Greek Church.

The word is used in the New Testament Epistle to the Hebrews to mean "high priest" (Heb 2:17; 3:1; 4:14,15; 5:1,5,10; 6:20; 7:26,27,28; 8:1,3; 9:7,11,25; 19:11; 13:11).

== Anglican Church ==
As of 2022, the Church of England and its associated Anglican Communion consists of 848 dioceses. Some of these priests hold political power and responsibilities outside of the church in ex officio capacities. The 26 most senior bishops of the Church of England are entitled to sit in the House of Lords, the Parliament of the United Kingdom's upper house, as the Lords Spiritual. Additionally, the Bishop of Sodor and Man is entitled to similarly sit as a member of the Legislative Council, the upper house of the Isle of Man's Tynwald.

== See also ==
- Ordinary (church officer)
