= List of religious titles and styles =

Formal style of address used for clergy

This is an index of religious honorifics from various religions.

== Buddhism ==
Buddhist honorifics and titles
Role	Description
Dalai Lama	
Gaden Tripa	
Panchen Lama	
Ani	
Dob-dob	
Dorje Lopön	
Gyalwang Drukpa	
Gelongma	
Geshe	
Je Khenpo	
Karmapa	
Khenpo	
Lama	The teachers of Dharma in Tibet.
Pandita	
Rinpoche	
Third Bardor Tulku Rinpoche	
Shabdrung	
Shamarpa	
Tai Situpa	
Tulku	In Tibetan Buddhism, a Lama who has through phowa and siddhi consciously determined to be reborn, often many times, in order to continue their Bodhisattva vow.
Acharya	
Agga Maha Pandita	
Ajahn	
Ajari	
Anāgāmi	
Anagarika	
Arhat	
Ayya	
Bhikkhu	
Bhikkhuni	
Bodhisattva	
Chakravartin	
Dhammacari	
Dharmarakṣita (Sanskrit "Protected by the Dharma")	
Jisha	
Kaisan	
Maha Kapphina	
Mae ji	
Mahasiddha	
Oshō	
Pratyekabuddha	
Rōshi	
Sakadagami	
Samanera	
Samaneri	
Sāvakabuddha	
Sayadaw	
Sensei	
Sikkhamānā	
Singhai	
Sotāpanna	
Śrāvaka	
Sunim	
Temple boy	
Tenzo	
Thero	
Thilashin	
Unsui	
Upajjhaya	
Upāsaka and Upāsikā	
Vajracharya	

== Christianity ==
Ecclesiastical titles are the formal styles of address used for members of the Christian clergy.

=== Latin Church clergy ===
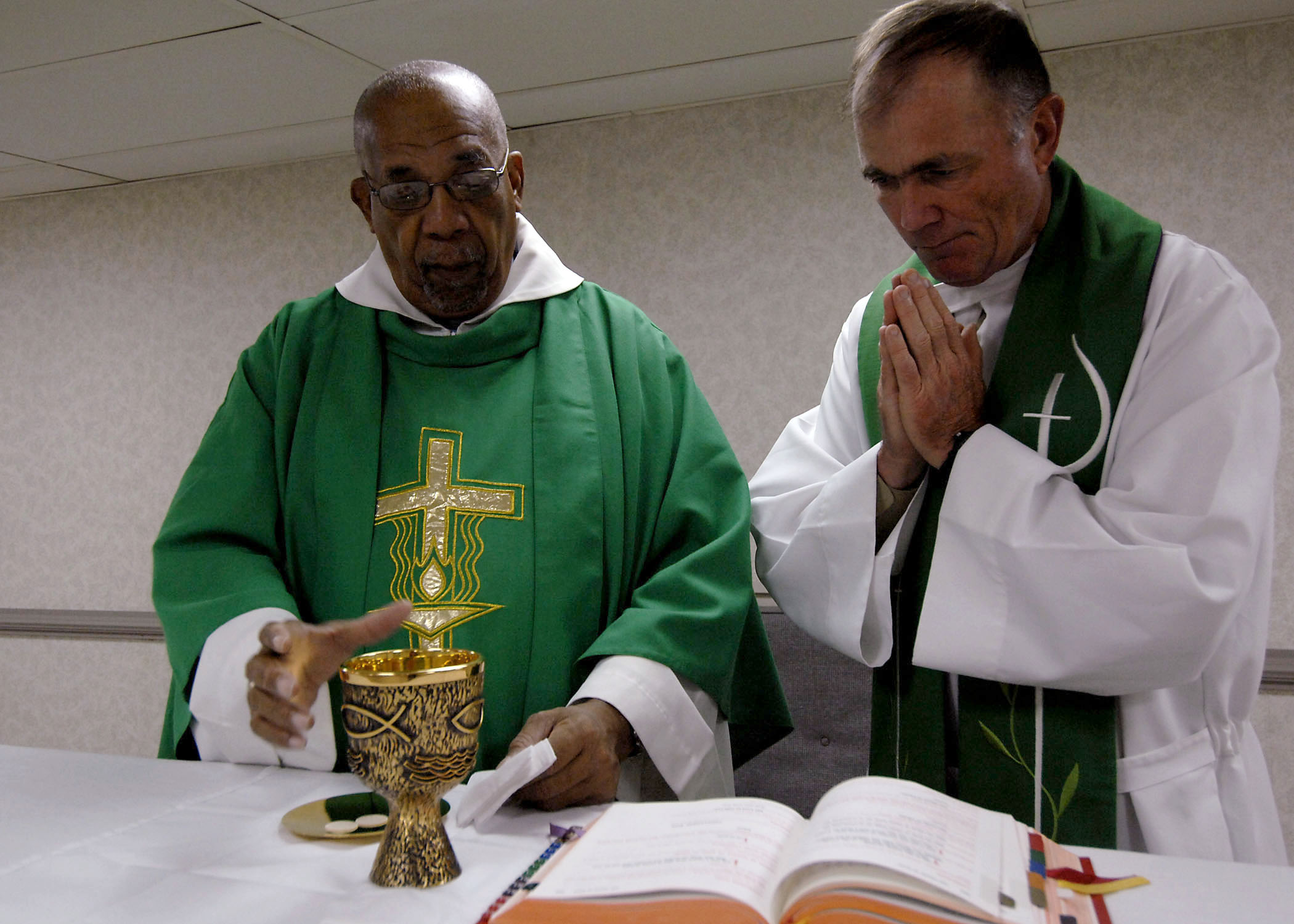
Two Catholic priests celebrating the Mass.

Latin Church clergy
Role	Description
Patriarch of an autonomous/particular church	Patriarch (Given Name); His Beatitude; Your Beatitude.
Cardinal	Cardinal (Full Name); His Eminence; Your Eminence.
Cardinal who is also an archbishop	Cardinal (Full Name), Archbishop of (Place); His Eminence; Your Eminence.
Archbishop	The Most Reverend (Full Name), (any postnominals), Archbishop of (Place); bishops in the U.S. commonly indicate their terminal degree(s) as postnominals, e.g., J.C.D. or S.T.D., or Ph.D. or D.D.; His Excellency; Your Excellency. Titular archbishops almost never indicate their respective sees in their titles.
Bishop	The Most Reverend (Full Name), (any postnominals), Bishop of (Place); Pontiff of (Place); The term Pontiff is most often used in relation to the Pontiff of Rome, but it can be used to refer to any bishop; Bishops in the U.S. commonly indicate their terminal degree(s) as postnominals, e.g., J.C.D., S.T.D., or Ph.D. or D.D.; His Excellency; Your Excellency. Titular bishops almost never indicate their respective sees in their titles.
Abbot	The Right Reverend (Full Name), (any religious order's postnominals); The Right Reverend Abbot; Abbot (Given Name); Abbot (Surname); Dom (Given Name); Father (Given Name). The custom for address depends on personal custom and custom in the abbey.
Abbess, Prioress, or other superior of a religious order of women or a province thereof	The Reverend Mother (Full Name), (any religious order's postnominals); Mother (Given Name). The title of women religious superiors varies greatly, and the custom of a specific order should be noted.
Protonotary Apostolic, Honorary Prelate, or Chaplain of His Holiness	The Reverend Monsignor (Full Name); Monsignor (Surname). The postnominals P.A. are often added for protonotaries apostolic. Postnominals are rarely added for honorary prelates or chaplains of His Holiness.
Vicar General	The Very Reverend (Full Name), V.G.; The Reverend (Full Name), V.G.; Father (Surname).
Judicial Vicar, Ecclesiastical Judge, Episcopal Vicar, Vicar Forane, Dean, Provincial Superior, or Rector	The Very Reverend (Full Name); Father (Surname).
Prior, both superiors of or in monasteries, or of provinces or houses of a religious order	The Very Reverend (Full Name), (any religious order's postnominals); Father (Surname).
Pastor of a parish, Parochial Vicar, Chaplain, or Priest	The Reverend (Full Name); Father (Surname).
Permanent Deacon	Reverend Mr. (Surname) (formal)"; "The Reverend Deacon (Full Name); Deacon (Surname); Deacon (Given Name) (informal).
Transitional Deacon, i.e., a deacon who is studying for the priesthood	The Reverend Deacon. (Full Name); Deacon (Full Name); Deacon (Surname).
Brother	Brother (Full Name), (any religious order's postnominals); Brother (Given Name). In some teaching orders Brother (Surname) is customary.
Religious sister or nun	Sister (Full Name), (any religious order's postnominals); Sister (Full Name); Sister (Given Name) (informal).
Candidate for priestly ministry (seminarian)	Mr. (Full Name); Mr. (Surname).
Candidate for diaconal or lay ministry (deacon candidate or lay ecclesial minister candidate)	Mr. (Full Name); Mr. (Surname).

==== United Kingdom and some other English-speaking countries ====
The major difference between U.S. practice and that in several other English-speaking countries is the form of address for archbishops and bishops. In Britain and countries whose Catholic usage it directly influenced:

- Archbishop: the Most Reverend (Most Rev.); addressed as Your Grace rather than His Excellency or Your Excellency.
- Bishop: "the Right Reverend" (Rt. Rev.); formally addressed as My Lord rather than Your Excellency. This style is an ancient one, and has been used in the western church for more than a thousand years; it corresponds to, but does not derive from, the Italian Monsignore and the French Monseigneur.

In Ireland, and in other countries whose Catholic usage it influenced, all bishops, not archbishops alone, are titled the Most Reverend (Most Rev.).

Clergy are often referred to with the title Doctor (Dr.), or have D.D. (Doctor of Divinity) placed after their name, where justified by their possession of such degree.

==== Italy ====
- Diocesan priest: The Reverend Lord (Dominus in Latin) (abbreviated as Rev. Do.); Don.
- Religious priest: Padre; Father (Fr.).
- Religious sister: The Reverend Sister (Rev. Sr.).
- (Permanent) Deacon: Deacon (Dcn.).

==== The Philippines ====
In the predominantly Catholic Philippines, ecclesiastical addresses are adapted from American custom but with modifications. The titles listed below are only used in the most formal occasions by media or official correspondence, save for the simpler forms of address. Post-nominals that indicate academic degree or membership in a religious order are usually included.

Philippines
Role	Description
Pope	The Pope is always titled "Ang Kanyáng Kabanalan" (Filipino for "His Holiness"). As such, the late Pope was styled "Ang Kanyáng Kabanalan Papa Francisco".
Cardinal	A cardinal is formally styled and addressed as "Ang Kanyáng Kabunyian", literally denoting "His Illustriousness" (Philippine English for "His Eminence"). Cardinals are informally addressed as "Cardinal" followed by their names; for example, "Cardinal Juan". Unlike in the United States, Ireland or Commonwealth nations, the name of a cardinal is always inscribed in the formula first name, "Cardinal", and last name; for example, "Juan Cardinal de la Cruz", similar to the syntax in German.
Archbishop	An archbishop is titled "Ang Mahál na Arsobispo" ("His Excellency, the Archbishop"). Archbishops are often addressed as "Archbishop" followed by their names; for example, "Archbishop Juan de la Cruz".
Bishop	A bishop is titled "Ang Mahál na Obispo" ("His Excellency, the Bishop"), in similar fashion to archbishops, and more commonly as "Ang Lubháng Kagalang-galang" ("The Most Reverend"). Also similar to archbishops, bishops are often addressed as "Bishop" followed by their names; for example, "Bishop Juan de la Cruz".
Monsignor	A monsignor is titled "Reberendo Monsenyor" ("Reverend Monsignor"), although if he holds extra administrative office he is titled according to his office. Vicars general, forane, and episcopal are titled "Very Reverend". Monsignori are colloquially addressed as "Monsignor" (abbreviated as "Msgr."). As defined, the inscribed title is "Monsignor" followed by first and then last name, or "The Reverend Monsignor" followed by first and then last name, while the spoken address is "Monsignor" followed by only last name.
Priest	Priests, both diocesan and those of a religious order, are titled "Reberendo Padre" ("Reverend Father", abbreviated as "Rev. Fr.") before their first and then last names. Priests are colloquially addressed as "Father" (abbreviated as "Fr.") before either their true name or last name, even their nickname. Reverend Father as a full title is similar to Anglican or Eastern Orthodox usage, in contrast to practice in some other English-speaking nations. However, "The Rev." alone before priests' names is usually found in articles sourced from the United States, like the Associated Press (AP), in Philippine newspapers.
Deacon	A deacon is titled "Reberendo" ("Reverend"); for example, "Reverend Juan de la Cruz". Deacons are rarely titled "Deacon" followed by their names as in the United States, except when addressing them formally. Instead, they are colloquially addressed as "Rev." in contrast to priests who are addressed as "Father".
Religious sisters / brothers	Religious sisters are titled "Sister" (abbreviated as "Sr."). Superiors are optionally titled "Mother" (abbreviated as "Mo.") and are usually addressed formally as "Reverend Sister/Mother" (abbreviated as "Rev. Sr./Mo."); for example, "Rev. Sr. Juana de la Cruz, OP" or "Rev. Mo. Juana de la Cruz, OSB". Contemplative nuns are formally and colloquially titled "Sor", a truncation of "Soror", which is Latin for "Sister". Prioresses and abbesses are formally addressed as "Reverend Mother". Religious brothers who are not priests are titled "Brother" (abbreviated as "Br."); for example, "Br. Juan de la Cruz, OFM". Having been influenced by the Spaniards, members of mendicant orders may be called "Fray"; for example, "Fray Juan de la Cruz, OSA". Since there are also mendicant orders whose missionaries are from Italy they opt to be addressed as "Fra", a truncation of "Frater", which is Latin for "Brother". Monks are called "'Dom'", an abbreviation of "Dominus" which means "Lord".

=== Eastern Catholic clergy ===
Although the styles and titles of Eastern Catholic clergy varies from language to language, in the Greek and Arabic-speaking world the following would be acceptable, but is by no means a full list of appropriate titles. It is notable that surnames are never used except in extra-ecclesial matters or to specify a particular person where many share one Christian name or ordination name. Where not noted, Western titles may be supposed. The following are common in Greek Melkite Catholic usage and in Greek Orthodox usage in the United States.

Eastern Catholic Church
Role	Description
Archbishop or Bishop	In Arabic, a bishop is titled "Sayedna", while in churches of Syriac tradition he is titled "Mar". If an Eastern Catholic archbishop or patriarch is made a cardinal he may be addressed as "His Eminence" and "Your Eminence", or the hybrid "His Beatitude and Eminence" and "Your Beatitude and Eminence".
Priest	In Arabic, "Abouna" and in Greek "Pappas".
Deacon	Identical to that of a priest in all ways except sometimes in the use of "Father Deacon" (in Arabic "Abouna Shammas" and in Greek "Pappas Diakonos").
Subdeacon	"Reverend Subdeacon" in inscribed address, and the Christian name with or without "Brother" is usually used, except in some traditions that use "Father Subdeacon". In Arabic, this is confused by "Shammas" being used for both the subdiaconate and the diaconate, the distinction being a "Deacon of the Letter" and a "Deacon of the Gospel" respectively. Often a deacon will be addressed as "Father" and a subdeacon as "Brother" to distinguish them.
Reader	"Reader" or "Brother" depending on the preference of the addresser.
Seminarians	"Brother" and "Brother Seminarian" are the most common titles; the appellations "Father Seminarian" and "Father Student" are used only by rural Greek- and Arabic-speaking laity.
Tonsured persons without a title	"Brother".

=== Lutheran churches ===
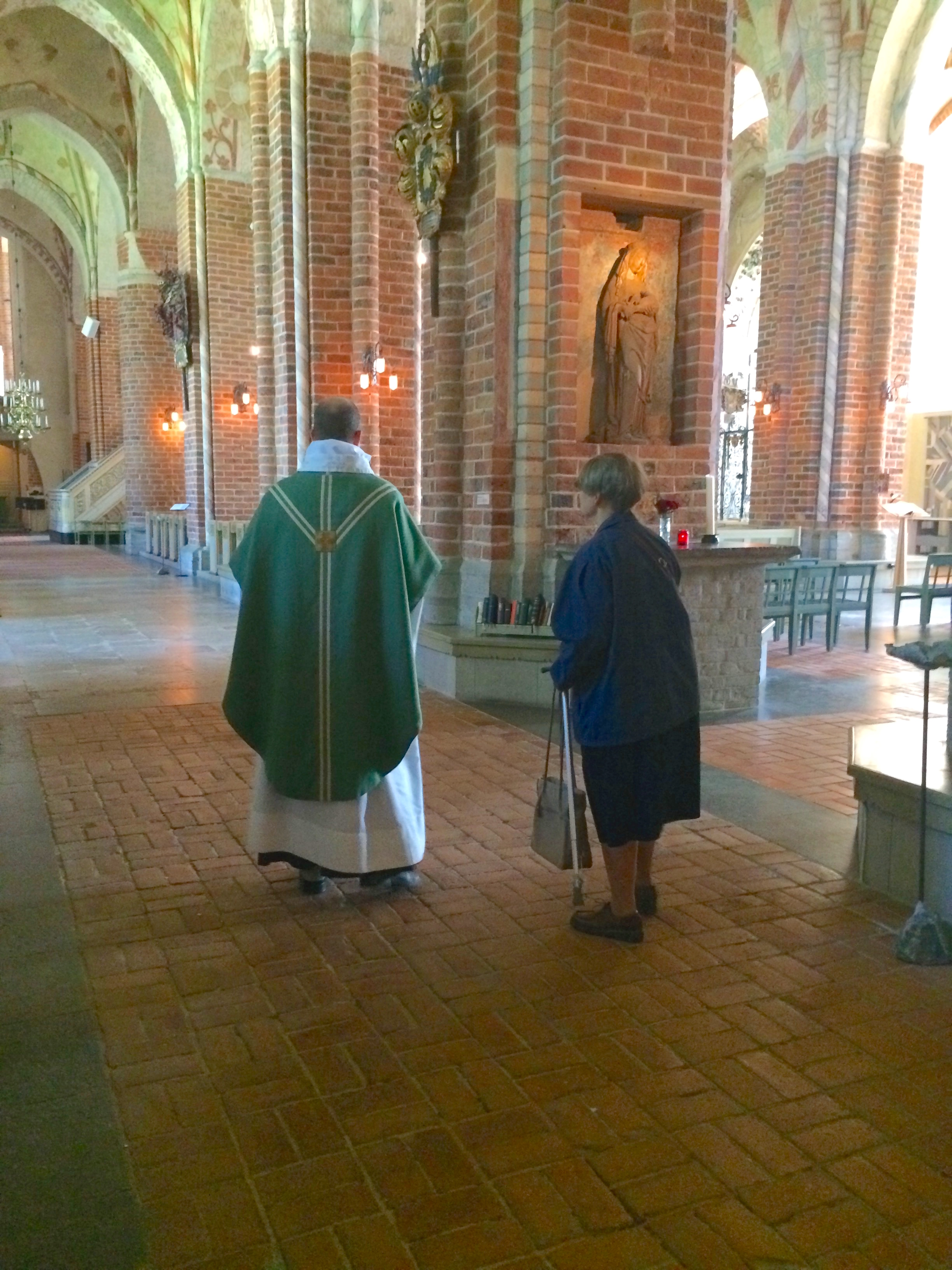
A Lutheran priest of the Church of Sweden prepares for the celebration of Mass in Strängnäs Cathedral.

Lutheran Church
Role	Description
Archbishop/Presiding Bishop	the Most Reverend (Most Rev.); Archbishop (Abp.; Arch.; Archbp.)/Presiding Bishop (P.B.).
Bishop	Bishop (Bp.); Reverend Bishop (Rev. Bp.); the Right Reverend (Rt. Rev.).; His Excellency; Your Excellency.
Pastor	the Reverend (Rev.); Pastor (Pr.).
Kantor	Kantor (Kantor)
Deacon	Deacon (Dcn.).
Vicar	Vicar (Vic.).
Seminarian	Seminarian (Sem.).
Ecclesiastical Doctor (Dr. eccl.), e.g., Ph.D. (Doctor of Philosophy), Dr. sc. rel. (Doctor of Religious Sciences/Studies), Dr. mph. (Doctor of Christian Metaphysics), Dr. sc. bs. (Doctor of Biblical Studies), et al.	Reverend Doctor.

=== Anglican Communion ===
In the Anglican Communion, added titles are referred to as "preferments" and are ordered by bishops. Such appointments that place a preferment title in front of "Reverend" are normally a permanent preferment, while those after "Reverend" are not. For example, a bishop or an archdeacon retain their titles even after leaving their ministry posts. Generally, the preferment of "canon", which can be given to either ordained or laity, is not a permanent preferment. However, Bishops have been known to prefer a lifetime honorific of "Canon" to lay canons. For religious orders, all preferments, except that of a mitred abbot, are temporary and associated with the role, not the individual.

Anglican Communion
Role	Description
Deacon	Deacons are styled as The Reverend, The Reverend Deacon, or The Reverend Mr/Mrs/Miss/Ms/Mx. (Note: 'Mx' is pronounced 'Mix' and is commonly used for non-binary individuals.)
Priest/presbyter	Priests/presbyters are usually styled as The Reverend, The Reverend Father/Mother (even if not a religious; abbreviated Fr/Mthr) or The Reverend Mr/Mrs/Miss/Ms/Mx.
Heads of some women's religious orders	...are styled as The Reverend Mother (even if not ordained).
Canon	Canons are often styled as The Reverend Canon when ordained, or simply The Canon Mr/Mrs/Miss/Ms/Mx when laity.
Dean	Deans are usually styled as The Very Reverend.
Archdeacon	Archdeacons are usually styled as The Venerable (The Ven).
Prior	Priors of monasteries may be styled as The Very Reverend.
Abbot	Abbots of monasteries may be styled as The Right Reverend.
Bishop	Bishops are styled as The Right Reverend or His Lordship.
Archbishop and primate	Archbishops and primates, including the Archbishop of Canterbury, and (for historical reasons) the Bishop of Meath and Kildare are styled as The Most Reverend, and addressed as Your Grace.

=== Methodism ===
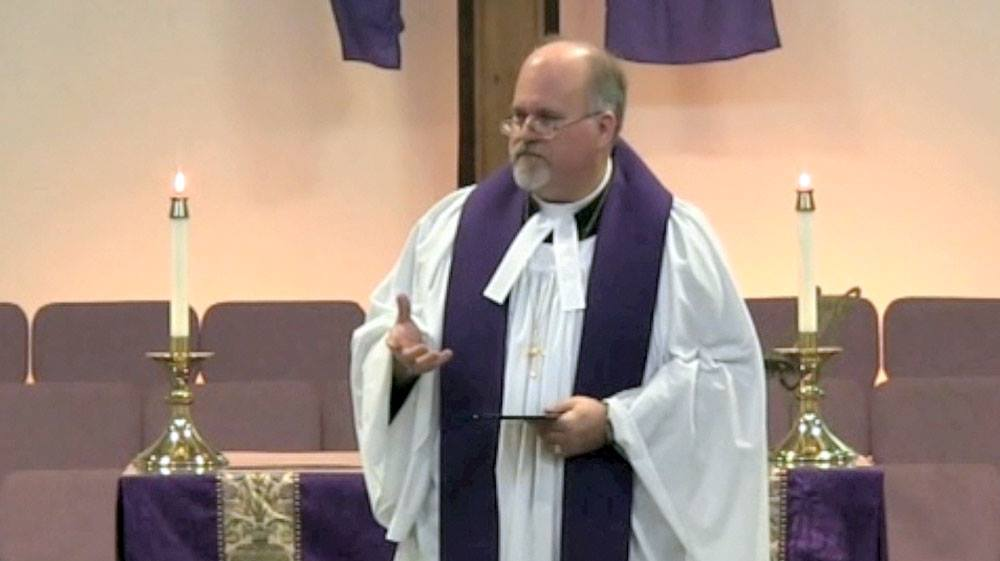
A Methodist pastor wearing a cassock, vested with a surplice and stole, with preaching bands attached to his clerical collar

Methodism
Role	Description
Elder	Elders/presbyters/pastors are addressed as Reverend, unless they hold a doctorate, in which case they are often addressed in formal situations as The Reverend Doctor. The Reverend, however, is used in more formal or in written communication, in addition to His/Her Reverence or Your Reverence.
Deacon	Deacons are addressed as Reverend in American Methodism, or Deacon in Britain and Southern Africa.
Bishops	Bishops are styled as Bishop or Your Grace.
Religious brothers and sisters	Religious brothers and sisters are styled as Br. or Sr.; for example, if their name was John Smith and they belonged to a religious order, they would be addressed as Brother John Smith.

=== Eastern Orthodox ===
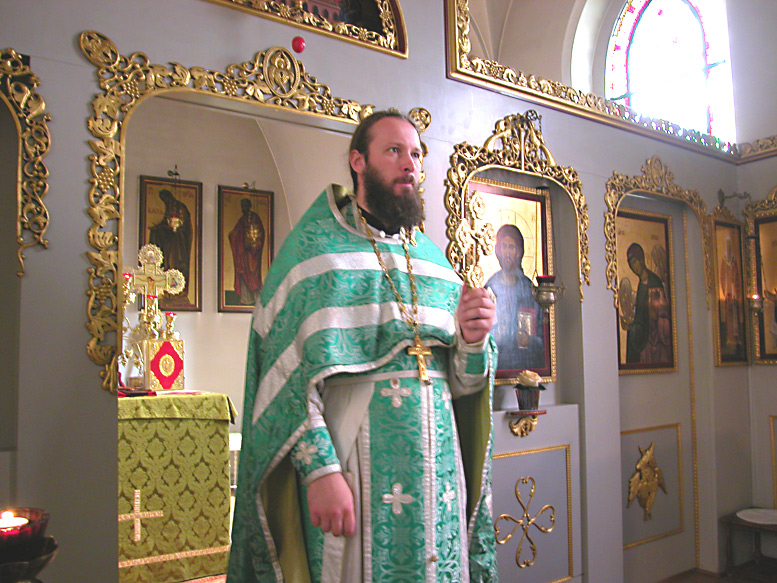
An Eastern Orthodox priest blesses his congregation at the conclusion of the Divine Liturgy.

Usage varies somewhat throughout the Eastern Orthodox Communion, and not every church uses every clerical rank. Surnames are typically not used for archpastors (rank of bishop or above) or monastics.

Eastern Orthodox honorifics and titles
Role	Description
Ecumenical Patriarch of Constantinople	Ecumenical Patriarch [insert name], His All-Holiness, Your All-Holiness. Bishop of Constantinople, with primacy within Orthodox communion; Successor of Saint Andrew the Apostle, one of the 12 Apostles of Jesus Christ
Patriarch	Patriarch [insert name] of [place], Patriarch, His Beatitude, Your Beatitude. The Patriarch of Alexandria is successor of Mark the Evangelist, author of the Gospel of Mark. The Patriarch of Antioch is one of the successors of Saint Peter, one of the Apostle of Jesus Christ. The Patriarch of Jerusalem is successor of Saint James the Just, one of Apostles of Jesus Christ.
Archbishop of an independent Church	The Most Reverend Archbishop [insert name] of [place], Archbishop John, His Beatitude, Your Beatitude.
Archbishop of a sub-national Church	The Most Reverend Archbishop [insert name] of [place], Archbishop John, His Eminence, Your Eminence.
Metropolitan	The Most Reverend Metropolitan [insert name] of [place], Metropolitan John, His Eminence, Your Eminence.
Titular Metropolitan	The Most Reverend Metropolitan [insert name] of [place], His Excellency, Your Excellency. Some Metropolitans use the style "The Very Most Reverend", and a Metropolitan who is the head of an independent Church is addressed as "Beatitude" rather than "Excellency".
Bishop	The Most Reverend Bishop [insert name] of [place], Bishop [insert name], His Grace, Your Grace.
Titular/Auxiliary Bishop	Same as for Bishops, above, and in other languages Sayedna (Arabic), Despota (Greek), Vladika (Russian).
Priest (Presbyter)	The Reverend Father or Father.
Protopriest	The Very Reverend Protopriest or Father.
Archpriest	The Very Reverend Archpriest [insert name] or Father.
Archimandrite	The Very Reverend Archimandrite [insert name], or The Right Reverend Archimandrite, or Father.
Hieromonk (Priest-monk)	The Reverend Hieromonk or Father. In other languages Abouna (Arabic), Pappas (Greek), Batushka (Russian)
Priest's Wife	Presbytera Mary (Greek), Khouria Mary (Arabic), Matushka Mary (Russian), Popadiya Mary (Serbian), Panimatushka (Ukrainian)
Deacon	The Reverend Father [insert name], Deacon [insert name], Father [insert name], Deacon Father [insert name], Deacon [insert name]
Protodeacon	The Reverend Protodeacon [insert name], Father [insert name], Deacon Father [insert name], Deacon [insert name]
Archdeacon	The Reverend Archdeacon [insert name], Father [insert name], Deacon Father [insert name], Deacon [insert name].
Hierodeacon (Deacon-monk)	The Reverend Hierodeacon [insert name], Father [insert name]
Deacon's Wife	Diakonissa Mary (Greek), or the same titles as a priest's wife
Abbot	The Right Reverend Abbot [insert name], Abbot [insert name], Father [insert name]
Abbess	The Reverend Mother Superior [insert name], The Very Reverend Abbess [insert name], Reverend Mother [insert name], Mother [insert name]
Monk	Monk [insert name], Father [insert name]
Rassophore Monk	Rassophore Monk [insert name], Father [insert name]
Stavrophore Monk	Stavrophore Monk [insert name], Father [insert name]
Schemamonk	Schemamonk [insert name], Father [insert name]
Novice	Novice [insert name]; or Brother [insert name]. The title "Brother" is a result of Latin influence; the title is only given to some novices with a special blessing.
Nun	Nun [insert name], Mother [insert name]
Rassophore Nun	Rassophore Nun [insert name], Sister [insert name]
Novice	Sister [insert name]

=== The Church of Jesus Christ of Latter-day Saints ===
Latter Day Saints honorifics and titles
Role	Description
Apostle	"Elder [surname]"
President of the Quorum of the Twelve Apostles (or Acting President)	"President [surname]"
Bishop	"Bishop [surname]" (the title is often retained as a courtesy after the individual is released from the calling)
Counselors in a Bishopric	"Brother [surname]"
Presiding Bishop and counselors in the Presiding Bishopric	"Bishop [surname]" (the title is often retained as a courtesy after the individual is released from the calling)
Branch president	"President [surname]"
Counselors in a branch presidency	"Brother [surname]"
Deacon	"Brother [surname]"
District President and counselors in a district presidency	"President [surname]"
Elder	"Brother [surname]" (except for full-time missionaries, in which case it is "Elder [surname]")
High priest	"Brother [surname]" (except for full-time missionaries, in which case it is "Elder [surname]")
Full-time missionaries (female)	"Sister [surname]"
Full-time missionaries (male)	"Elder [surname]"
Mission president	"President [surname]"
Counselors in a mission presidency	"President [surname]"
Mission president's wife	"Sister [surname]"
Patriarch	"Brother [surname]" or "Patriarch [surname]"
Presiding Patriarch	"Elder [surname]" or "Patriarch [surname]"
Priest	"Brother [surname]"
President of the Church and counselors in the First Presidency	"President [surname]"
Presidents of the Seventy	"Elder [surname]"
Seventy	"Elder [surname]"
Local and general Relief Society, Young Women, Young Men, Sunday School, and Primary presidents	"President [surname]"
Stake President and counselors in a stake presidency	"President [surname]"
Teacher	"Brother [surname]"
Temple president	"President [surname]"
Counselors in a temple presidency	"President [surname]"
Matron (temple president's wife)	"Sister [surname]"
Assistant to the Matron (wife of a temple presidency counselor)	"Sister [surname]"
President (LDS Church honorific)	"President [surname]" is used for most positions that use the word "President" in the title (including all quorum presidents), with the following exceptions: "Elder [surname]" is used for members of the Presidency of the Seventy; People in positions that use the word "Presiding" in the formal name are never called "President [surname]"

=== Protestantism ===
Note: due to the wide variety of Protestant practices there is not a standard form of address. In one church the pastor (for example Fred Jones) may be called "Brother Jones", in a neighboring church he might be styled "Pastor Jones", others may call him "Brother Fred", "Pastor Fred", "Reverend Jones", "Minister Fred", "Preacher Jones" or any of a myriad of other titles and combinations. When in doubt, the best course of action is to ask how the person wants to be addressed.

Protestant Christian honorifics and titles
Role	Description
Preacher	Some churches in the United States
Pastor	In larger churches with many staff members, "senior pastor" commonly refers to the person who gives the sermons the majority of the time, with other persons having titles relating to their position or duties, for example "associate pastor", "worship pastor", or "youth pastor". Of special note is "Executive Pastor" who is generally responsible for overseeing administrative and operational aspects of a church, including staffing, finances, strategic planning, daily operations to free the Senior Pastor to focus on vision, teaching, and shepherding.
Minister	
Priest	See Lutheran Priest, Anglican/Episcopalian Priest for examples.
Reverend	
Elder	Some Presbyterian denominations distinguish between Teaching Elder (aka Minister of Word and Sacrament or Pastor) and Ruling Elder. Teaching Elders are ordained by the Presbytery and fill the role of pastor. Ruling Elders are ordained by the local church and serve on a board that leads the church.
Deacon	
Priestess	Specific to Christian spiritualist, Independent protestant, and Non-denominational Christian, women who are ministers.
Bishop	See also Bishop (Catholic Church)
Archbishop	
Resident Bishop	This title is exclusive to the United Methodist Church.
Doctor	Most common in non-mainline churches (Doctor of Metaphysics (D.o.M. or Latin Dr. mph.) and Doctor of Divinity (D.o.D., alternative: D.D.). High ranking teachers in certain evangelical institutions bear the title "Scolasticus Theologicae" or “Professor” (ecclesiastical) (Pundit/Clerical professor of Theology). These are clerical titles, not academic.

=== Catholicism ===
Catholicism titles
Role	Description
Pope	"His Holiness", "Your Holiness" Bishop of Rome, with primacy within the universal college of bishops. Presiding bishop of the entire Catholic communion, Patriarch of the Latin Church, Primate of Italy, Metropolitan Archbishop of the Roman Province, Successor of Saint Peter.
Patriarch	"His Beatitude", "Your Beatitude" The presiding bishop of an autocephalous, sui iuris, or autonomous church.
Cardinal	"His Eminence", "Your Eminence" A member of the college of cardinals, given secondary incardination to the Church of Rome and therefore as electors of the bishop of Rome (pope). An adjunct honor and responsibility on top of their primary office (as arch/bishop of a diocese, president of a dicastery, nuncio, etc)
Major Archbishop	"His Excellency", "Your Excellency" / Most Reverend Major archbishops are the heads of some of the Eastern Catholic Churches. Their authority within their sui juris church is equal to that of a patriarch, but they receive fewer ceremonial honors.
Primate	Primate can be used as synonymous for "presiding bishop" at any level within the church - e.g., a patriarch is primate within his autonomous church, a Metropolitan is primate within his province, etc. Most commonly in the Latin Church, it is a title given to the bishop of the oldest diocese or local church within a nation or country, and historically would preside over national synods (now a role taken on by elected presidents of bishops conferences).
Metropolitan Archbishop	"His Excellency", "Your Excellency" / Most Reverend A metropolitan archbishop is a bishop of a diocese which has primacy within an ecclesiastical province, or group of dioceses. In addition to his regular duties as diocesan bishop, he presides over meetings of all the bishops in a province. Sometimes a metropolitan may also be the head of an autocephalous, sui iuris, or autonomous church when the number of adherents of that tradition are small. In the Latin Rite, metropolitans are always archbishops; in many Eastern churches, the title is "metropolitan," with some of these churches using "archbishop" as a separate office.
Archbishop	"His Excellency", "Your Excellency" / Most Reverend While most archbishops are metropolitan archbishops, on occasion a non-Metropolitan may be a titular archbishop, an archbishop ad personam, coadjutor archbishops, or diocesan archbishops whose see is no longer a metropolitan see. In these cases it is largely an honorific only.
Bishop	"His Excellency", "Your Excellency" / Most Reverend, Most Rev. Most bishops are the chief pastor of a diocese or eparchy with geographical boundaries, having authority over all of presbyters, deacons, and lay ecclesial ministers therein. A coadjutor bishop is an assistant bishop who has the automatic right to succeed the incumbent diocesan bishop. The appointment of coadjutors is often seen as a means of providing for continuity of church leadership. An auxiliary bishop is a titular bishop who is an assistant to a diocesan bishop. He is to be appointed as a vicar general or at least as an episcopal vicar of the diocese in which he serves. A titular bishop is an official who is ordained bishop but not functioning in an episcopal office, so is given title to a defunct diocese (a titular see). He may serve as an auxiliary bishop of a diocese or as an official of the Roman Curia.
Vicar General	Very Reverend, Very Rev., Reverend Monsignor, Rev. Msgr. A presbyter granted vicarious authority from a diocesan bishop for the entire diocese, as a kind of "vice bishop" for administrative purposes. Often also acts as moderator of the curia / chief of staff.
Chorbishop	A chorbishop is an official of a diocese in some Eastern Christian churches. Chorbishops are not generally ordained bishops – they are not given the sacrament of Holy Orders in that degree – but function as assistants to the diocesan bishop with certain honorary privileges.
Abbot, Prior	Right Reverend, Rt. Rev. The monk in charge of a monastery or abbey, usually also ordained to the presbyterate.
Abbess, Prioress	Reverend Mother, Mother Abbess The nun in charge of a monastery, convent, or abbey.
Episcopal Vicar	Very Reverend, Very Rev. A bishop or priest granted vicarious authority from a diocesan bishop for a specific area of ministry (e.g., Judicial Vicar, Vicar for Clergy, etc.). A deacon or lay ecclesial minister may be appointed to the same role, but typically called by a different title.
Vicar Forane, Dean	Very Reverend, Very Rev. A presbyter (or, historically, a deacon) with primacy within a specific deanery or vicariate, a subdivision of a diocese consisting of several parishes.
Knight/Dame of the Order of Pius IX, the Order of St. Gregory, the Order of Pope St. Sylvester	"Sir", "Dame" Three classes of papal honours for laity. Purely honorary.
Protonotary Apostolic, Honorary Prelate, Chaplain of His Holiness	Reverend Monsignor, Rev. Msgr., or simply Monsignor. Three classes of papal honours for clergy. Purely honorary.
Canon	Very Reverend, Very Rev., Canon Members of a 'chapter' of a cathedral or other significant church. Originally indicative of simply a community of clergy living a semi-religious/monastic life, now often used purely as an honorific.
Presbyter, Priest	Reverend, Rev., Father Presbyter is the official name of the ministers commonly called 'priest'; persons ordained to the presbyterate. Presbyters are ordained as ministers of word and sacrament, most commonly assigned to serve as pastors of parishes or to assist in this ministry.
Pastor, "parish priest"	Presbyter given charge of a parish or other stable community of the faithful, under the authority of the diocesan bishop. Supervises other presbyters, deacons, and lay ecclesial ministers serving in the parish. A deacon or lay ecclesial minister may serve in this role, but is given a different title (e.g., Pastoral Life Director, Pastoral Coordinator, etc.)
Parochial Vicar	A presbyter assigned to assist at a parish, under the authority of the pastor.
Deacon (Permanent/Vocational)	Referred to as Reverend Deacon, or Deacon. A minister ordained to the diaconate, as a collaborator with the bishop and extension of his ministry. Traditionally an alternate vocational path equal to and alongside the presbyterate.
Lay Ecclesial Ministers, Pastoral Workers, Catechists	Referred to by appropriate civil titles (Dr., Mr., Ms., etc.) Non-ordained yet vocational and professional ministers authorised by the diocesan bishop or other ecclesiastical authority. Typically with the same education and formation as a presbyter or deacon.
Chaplain	A minister who has been entrusted with the spiritual care of some specific organization. May be ordained or a lay ecclesial minister.
Religious Brothers, including monks, friars	Referred to as Brother, Br., or Rev. Br. A man who has taken solemn vows to a form of community life.
Religious Sisters, including nuns	Referred to as Sister, Sr., or Rev. Sr. A woman who has taken solemn vows to a form of community life.
Transitional Deacon (seminarian)	Referred to as Reverend Mister, Rev. Mr.
Father	The style "Father" is an ancient form of address for any clergy: Bishop, Presbyter, or (permanent) Deacon. Only transitional deacons should not be addressed as such. In some cultures, it is most common to refer to bishops by their title or style (e.g., Bishop Peter), only presbyters as "Father", and deacons as "Deacon".

== Hinduism ==
Hinduism honorifics and titles
Role	Description
Abhyasi	"One who studies"
Acharya	Head of Organization (can marry and have children)
Bhagat	Devotee
Chakravartin	the emperor of whole earth
Shankaracharya	
Devadasi	a woman devotee who is living for god
Dvija	
Firekeeper	
Godman	The Godman is a Hindu ascetic
Goswami	
Guru	Originally referring in Sanskrit to Brihaspati, a Hindu divine figure, today the term is commonly used in Hinduism, Buddhism, and Sikhism, as well as in many new religious movements.
Gymnosophists	
Jagad guru	world guru or world teacher
Mahamandaleshwar	
Mahant	Head of an Organization (could be an Acharya or Sadhu)
Maharshi	great sage Or great rishi
Mantrik	a priest who knows black magic
Melshanthi	
Pandit	Brahmin scholar or teacher or any person who is scholar in anything
Paramahamsa	Refers to the 500 Paramhamsa (Sadhus) initiated by Purna Purushottam Nārāyan (Bhagwan Swaminarayan)
Paramguru	the ultimate teacher or ultimate guru
Pujari	a priest who does worship to god or goddess
Rajarshi	the king of all sage, or a king who lives like a sage
Rishi	or "Sadhu"
Rishi Muni	same as "Rishi"
Sadhaka	higher level of disciple, student who is of highest level in knowledge or on path of enlightenment
Sadhu	Religious ascetic or holy person. Dressed in saffron clothes. Sadhus live a life free from greed, ego, lust, anger, and other panchvishays (pleasure senses). Placed at the top of the caste pyramid. Also known as Monks, Yogi, Saints, Sant, Santos, or Sadhus.
Saint	Also known as Sadhu, Sant, Santos.
Sannyasa	Leaving one's life and joining Sainthood. Becoming a Sadhu.
Sant	Also known as Sadhu, Saint, Santos.
Satguru	"True Guru"
Shaunaka	
Shishya	disciple, student of guru
Swami	An ascetic or yogi who has been initiated into the religious monastic order founded by Adi Sankara, or to a religious teacher. When used as a prefix with a monastic name, "Swami" usually refers to men who have taken the oath of renunciation and abandoned their social status. The monastic name is usually a single word without a first and last name.
Yogi	"One who meditates" Also a word for Sadhu, Saint, Sant, Monk.

== Islam ==
Islamic honorifics and titles
Role	Description
ʿAlayhiṣ ṣalāt wa as salām	Means "Upon him prayer and peace"; used for all earlier Prophets and Angels.
ʿAlayhi wa ʿalā ālihi aṣ ṣalāt wa as salām	Means "Upon him and his family be prayer and peace"
Salawāt Allah ʿalayhi wa ālihi	Means "The exaltations of God shall be upon him and his family"
Salawat Allah wa Salamuhu 'Alayhi wa Alihi	Means "The exaltations and peace of God be upon him and his family"
Salla 'llah 'Alayhi wa Alihi wa Sahbihi wa sallam	Means, "May God exalt and bring peace upon him, his family, and his companions"
Salla 'llah 'alayhi wa Alihi wa sallam	Means, "May God exalt and bring peace upon him and his progeny"
Radiya Allaho 'anho	Means "May God be pleased with him"; Used for companions of prophet as well as scholars
Akhoond	
Allamah	A Sunni Islam term meaning the most respected of the Marjas; it is a Persian name for teacher that is also used by some to denote a teacher of extraordinary respect.
Amir al-Mu'minin	Leader of the faithful (only used for four Rashidun Caliphate)
Ash Shakur	
Ayatollah	In Shi'a Islam, a high ranking title given to clerics.
Custodian of the Two Holy Mosques	was Used By Saladin, Sultan Of the Ottoman Empire and Recently used By the King of The Kingdom of Saudi Arabia
Dervish	One who never disappoint beggars
Emir	
Habib
Hadrat	Honorific title for all Muslims
Hajji	One who performed the Hajj Pilgrimage
Imam	In Shi'a Islam, the Imam is appointed by God, and Muhammed was informed that the number of Imams after him will be 12.
Karram-Allah-u Wajhahu	Other Honorific title of Ali Ibn Abi Talib
Khwaja	Teacher of All Saints at that time
Khoja	A Turkestani word
Mahdi	The 12th Imam will come either as a first time appearance or as a reappearance after a long occultation. The Mahdi is the greatest teacher, the Messiah of the Islamic World, and the Maitreya of Buddhism.
Makhdoom	
Marabout	A spiritual teacher of Islam as it is taught in the West Africa and Maghreb, The word comes from the Berber concept of Saint. The "marabout" is known as "Sayyed" (سيد) to the Arabic speaking Maghribians.
Marja	In Shi'a Islam, The name means source to follow.
Mawlawi	A Persian word for teacher meaning Master.
Mawlānā	Learned one of Qur'an And Hadhith
Mohyeddin	Means Reviver of the Faith or Reviver of Religion. The designation of Mohyeddin as a title carries religious connotations within Islamic theology, rooted in the concept of tajdid (renewal).
Moinuddin	Helper of Religion (used only for Gharib Nawaz, Most famous Sufi of India
Mu'min	Highest Rank For followers of Qur'Aan and Hadhith
Mufti	A guide on the Path to the Source of living Water (the divine sharia law) is called Mufti.
Muhaddith	Someone who has profound knowledge of the Haddith, and teaches by Narration, or storytelling.
Mullah	The title of the teachers at the Madrasahs, Islamic schools. Mullah is a teacher in regard of being respected as a vicar and guardian of Qur'an and the Islamic traditions.
Mujaddid	Someone sent by God to aid the Umma and revive Islam at the beginning of every century .
Murshid	Spiritual Teacher
Otin	
Peace be upon him	Used for Friends of Allah
Pir	Spiritual Leader [Male]
Pirani	Spiritual Leader [Female]
Qalandar	Mystic
Radhiallahu 'anhu	Used for Friends of Allah with Highest Rank
Rahimahullah	Used for Friends of Allah
Rais	Chief, Leader (Arabic)
Sayyid	Descendant of Prophet Muhammad's Daughter Named Fatima Al Zahra
Seghatoleslam	In Shi'a Islam, is an honorific title, that designates narrators whose justice and trustworthiness have been explicitly verified.
Sharif	To Give Respect
Sheikh	An Arabic honorific term that literally means Elder. It is a long historic debate in many cultures whether the elder in itself denotes the role and status of a teacher.
Sheikh ul-Islam	
Subhanahu wa ta'ala	
Sultan	King
Sultana	King [Female] Used only for Razia Sultan of Delhi Sultanat
Thangal	
Ulema/Ulama	Ulema or Ulama are usually referred to as the docters of the Sacred Islamic Religion and Law.
Ustaz	Teacher (in Arabic)

== Judaism ==
Jewish honorifics and titles
Role	Description
Rabbi	Literally means ‘great one’. The word Rabbi is derived from the Hebrew root word רַב, rav, which in biblical Hebrew means ‘great’ or ‘distinguished (in knowledge)’.
Av Beit Din	
Chief Rabbi	
Choizer	Reb yoel
Fellow Student	
Gadol	
Gaon	
Hakham	
Hakham Bashi	
Illui	
Kohen Gadol	
Lamdan	
Maggid	
Maran	
Mashgiach ruchani	
Mashpia	
Meiniach	
Nagid	
Posek	
Rav	
Rebbe	
Rishon LeZion	
Rosh yeshiva	
Savoraim	
Segan	
Talmid Chacham	
Tzadik	
Archipheracite	
Badchen	
Cantor	This title has a different meaning in Reform Judaism.
Gabbai	
Kohen	
Mashgiach	
Mashgiach ruchani	
Mashpia	
Melamed	
Meshulach	
Mohel	
Cantorate	This position had a different meaning to the Reform Jewish in the 19th Century.
Rosh yeshiva	
Sandek	
Schulklopfer	
Shaliah	
Shechita	
Sofer	
Tzadikim Nistarim	
Rebbitzen	
Rabbanit	
Admo"r	"Admor" is an acronym for "Adonainu, Morainu, VeRabbeinu," a phrase meaning "Our Master, Our Teacher, and Our Rebbe." This is an honorific title given to scholarly leaders of a Jewish community. In writing, this title is placed before the name, as in "Admor of Pinsk" or "R' (stands for Rabbi, Rav, or Reb) Ploni Almoni, Admor of Redomsk."
Shlit"a	'Shlit"a' is an acronym for "Sheyikhye Lirot Yamim Tovim Arukim/Amen," "May he live a good long life" or "May he live a good life, Amen," given to a revered rabbi or to someone's child's Rebbe (teacher). This title is usually placed before the name.
K'vod K'dushat	"K'vod K'dushat," meaning "The honor of [his] holiness". This title is usually placed before the name. It is found as early as in the 1531 edition of the Arukh.
Shy'	"Shy'" is an acronym for "Sheyikhye," meaning "May he live". This title is usually placed after the name.

== Neopaganism ==
Pagan honorifics and titles
Role	Description
Volkhvy	Heathen priests among the pre-Christian Rus' people.
Zhrets	Sacrificial and divinatory priests within the Slavic Religion
Gothi/Gythia	A title sometimes used by adherents of Heathenism, referring to a priest or ceremonial leader.
Witch (Ldy./Lrd.)	A title used by someone who practices Witchcraft. Many Wiccans are Witches because of the inclusion of witchcraft in many Wiccan traditions. Most Witches are not Wiccans and practice Traditional Craft or folk magic.
Priest/Priestess	A title that may be used within various forms of Paganism. In Wicca, it denotes a male or female who has been initiated into the priesthood in the 1st or 2nd degree depending on the tradition.
High Priest/High Priestess	A Wiccan role. One becomes a High Priest/ess once they attain the second or third degree, depending upon which tradition of Wicca they belong to.
Bard	1st degree (after candidacy/initiation) title used by the Order of Bards, Ovates, and Druids that is primarily centered on song, spoken word, memory, tradition, and poetry.
Ovate	2nd degree used by the Order of Bards, Ovates, and Druids. It is the centered on healing, divination, and herbalism.
Druid(s) (Drd./Drds.)	A masculine term for someone who practices druidry, the indigenous spirituality of the Celts. People who belong to a grove or are members of a druid order will use this term generically regardless of gender to indicate they practice the overall faith instead of a holding the rank of a specific degree title. In the Order of Bards, Ovates, and Druids, druid is the gender neutral 3rd degree, the priest title, centered on teaching, philosophy, mysticism, and other leadership roles.
Druidess Druidesses (Bd./Bds.)	The female form of the word druid. A woman who practices the druid spirituality. Mainly found in Irish mythology.
Archdruid (ADrd.)	A title that is held by the chief or head of a druid order. Sometimes independent groves (druid form of circle/coven) may have an archdruid, but generally this is reserved for the head of an entire organization such as the Reformed Druids of North America (RDNA), The Ancient Order of Druids in America (AODA), Ár nDraíocht Féin: A Druid Fellowship (our own druidism in Irish), and the Order of Bards, Ovates, and Druids in England.
Solitary practitioner	A person who practices Neopaganism alone and does not belong to a group, circle, grove or organization. Sometimes they may belong to a group or organization, but may live too far from other members to attend and chose to do a solitary practice. This is often the case with druid orders that are national and international organizations and have members spread out across the globe. Members of groups and organizations who attend functions will often have a solitary practice but this is not a "solitary practitioner".
Santero/Santera	A person who is the priest or priestess clergy in Santeria.
Houngan/Mambo	A person who is the priest or priestess in Haitian Voodoo.
Hiereus	A male priest in Hellenism aka Greek paganism.
Hieria	A female priestess in Hellenism aka Greek paganism.

== Raëlism ==
Raëlism honorifics and titles
Role	Description
'Guide of Guides'	The main head of Raëlian faith and self-described as 'Planetary Guide'
Bishop (Raëlism)	Head of continental, national and regional chapters and self-subscribed as 'Continental head, National and Regional guides'
Priest (Raëlism)	Head of National and regional chapters and self-subscribed as 'National and Regional guides'
Assistant Priest	Head of Regional chapter and self-subscribed as 'Regional guide'
Organizer	Leader of the organized Raëlian group.
Assistant Organizer	Assistant to a leader of the Raëlian group.

== Scientology ==
Scientology honorifics and titles
Role	Description
Chairman (Scientology)	The main head of Scientologist faith, Religious Technology Center, and Church of Spiritual Technology
Officer (Scientology)	The head of Sea Org
President (Scientology)	The head of most all Scientology-related organizations like the Church of Scientology International

== Serer ==
Serer honorifics and titles
Role	Description
Lamane	"Master of the land". Ancient lamanic class of the Serer people. Guardians of Serer religion, laws and ethics. Extinct (see States headed by ancient Serer Lamanes).
Saltigue	"Ministers of the religious cult". The Serer priestly class.

== Zoroastrianism ==
Zoroastrianism honorifics and titles
Role	Description
Mobad, Mobedyar	
Herbad	
Dastur	

== See also ==
- List of religious topics
- List of education topics
