= Shamma Friedman =

American-Israeli Talmud scholar

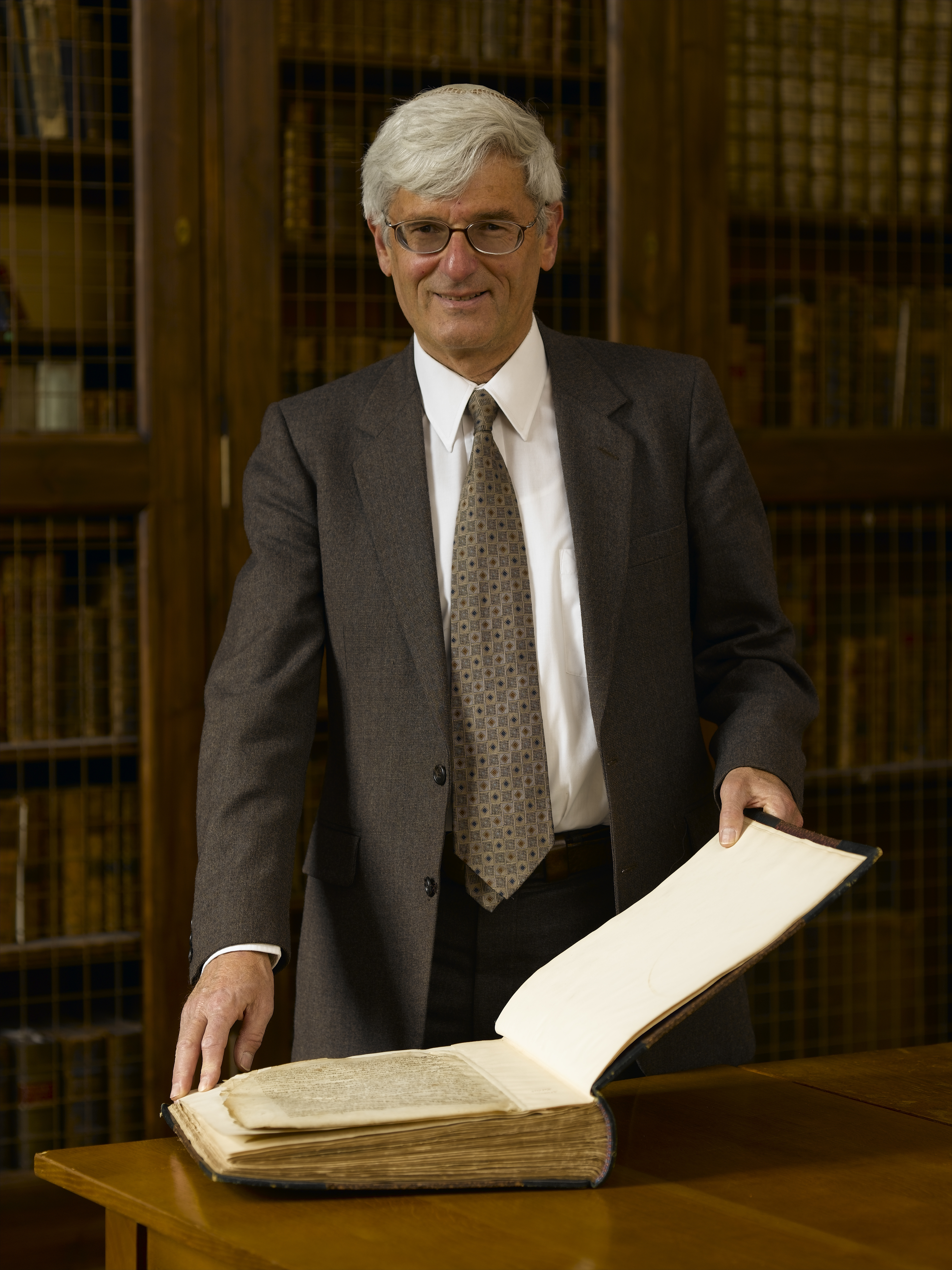
Shamma Friedman

Shamma Friedman (Hebrew: שמא פרידמן; born March 8, 1937) is a scholar of rabbinic literature and is Distinguished Service Professor Emeritus at The Jewish Theological Seminary (JTS).

== Biography ==
Shamma Friedman was born in Philadelphia, Pennsylvania. He began to study Hebrew at the age of ten. In the summers he went to Camp Ramah. He was first exposed to Talmud study by Professor Nahum Sarna, who taught a group of students tractate Beitza one summer. After high school, Friedman attended the University of Pennsylvania (BA and Phi Beta Kappa, 1958) and Gratz College (BHL, 1958). He continued his studies at JTS where he was ordained as a rabbi (1964) and received the first PhD in Talmud (1966) granted by the institution with his thesis, “The Commentary of R. Jonatan haKohen of Lunel on Bava Kamma,” under the supervision of Prof. Haim Zalman Dimitrovsky. Among his teachers at The Jewish Theological Seminary, it was Prof. Saul Lieberman, doyen of academic talmudists of the twentieth century, who influenced Friedman most.

== Academic career ==
Friedman taught at JTS from 1964 and became an official faculty member in 1967. He retired in 2020. In 1973, Friedman and his wife Rachel (née Swergold) moved to Israel with their four children, where Friedman served as the dean of JTS’s campus in Jerusalem (currently the Schechter Institute ). Friedman also served as the Director of JTS’s Schocken Institute In 1985, he founded the Saul Lieberman Institute of Talmudic Research of JTS in memory of his teacher. The Institute is dedicated to the computerization of Talmud manuscripts and the collection of scholarly bibliography on talmudic passages. In 1993, Friedman founded the Society for the Interpretation of the Talmud, which publishes scholarly commentaries to individual chapters of the Babylonian Talmud, written in a style for academic and non-academic audiences. At Bar Ilan University, where he taught in the Talmud Department, Friedman founded the site, Primary Textual Witnesses to Tannaitic Literature. He also founded the online journal in rabbinics, Oqimta.

== Research ==
Friedman has published over 150 articles in the fields of Talmudic philology and source criticism, as well as Hebrew and Aramaic Linguistics, and has authored seven books. In his research, Friedman has been a pioneer in the writing of critical commentaries, from the analysis of an individual sugya (passage) to complete chapters of Talmud. Friedman’s scholarship is primarily a study of the talmudic material through an internal comparative approach, contrasting literary forms, language, and concepts found throughout talmudic literature. In 1977, in his now classic study, “Al Derekh Heker Hasugya,” and following studies, he emphasized the almost universal relative lateness of the Aramaic ‘give and take’ stated anonymously in the talmudic sugya.

In his scholarship, Friedman has highlighted the creative literary intervention of the transmitters of talmudic texts, which is represented in all the historical layers of the Talmud and reaches its greatest expression in the Babylonian Talmud. For example, in his detailed analyses of Mishnah and Tosefta parallels, in a series of articles and in his book, Tosefta Atiqta, Friedman has argued that for specific examples, the Tosefta version of a tradition is earlier than its later reworked Mishnah parallel. According to this thesis, select Tosefta traditions may preserve the ‘raw’ material from which later Mishnah traditions were fashioned. Regarding baraitot found both in tannaitic collections and in the Talmuds, Friedman has argued that the parallel baraitot show the degree to which Tosefta baraitot were transformed in the Babylonian Talmud and to a lesser extent the Palestinian during the process of transmission from their original tannaitic literary contexts to their later amoraic and post-amoraic contexts. Friedman has also authored numerous studies on the literature of the Rishonim, especially on the contributions of Rashi and Rambam. Furthermore, Friedman consistently provides a framework for highlighting how critical understandings of the Talmud provide important insights into the interpretive contributions of the Rishonim.

In 2010, Friedman received the Mifal Hapayis Prize in the field of Rabbinic Literature. In 2014, the Israel Prize in Talmud. The Friedmans have four children, ten grandchildren, and a great-grandson. His brother is the Cairo Geniza scholar, Mordechai Akiva Friedman.

== Selected works ==
Commentary of R. Jonathan of Lunel on Bava Kamma with introduction and notes (Hebrew), Jewish Theological Seminary and Feldheim, New York and Jerusalem, 1969, lxxii & 400 pp

Tosefta Atiqta: Synoptic Parallels of Mishna and Tosefta Analyzed with a Methodological Introduction (Pesah Rishon), Bar-Ilan University Press: Ramat Gan, 2002

Talmud Arukh, BT Bava Metzi’a VI: Critical Edition with Comprehensive Commentary, Text Volume and Introduction, Jerusalem, 1996.

Talmud Arukh, BT Bava Metzi’a VI: Critical Edition with Comprehensive Commentary, Commentary Volume (Hebrew), Jerusalem, 1990

Talmud Ha-Igud, BT Gittin Chapter IX, The Society for the Interpretation of the Talmud, Jerusalem 2020.

Talmudic Studies, Investigating the Sugya, Variant Readings, and Aggada, New York and Jerusalem: The Jewish Theological Seminary of America, 2010

Studies in Tannaitic Literature, Methodology, Terminology, and Content (Asuppot VII), Jerusalem: The Bialik Institute, 2013

Studies in the Language and Terminology of Talmudic Literature, Jerusalem: The Academy of the Hebrew Language, 2014

“Rashi’s Talmudic Commentaries: Revisions and Recensions” (Hebrew, English Summary), Rashi Studies, ed. Z. A. Steinfeld, Ramat Gan, 1993, pp. 147–175

“The Holy Scriptures Defile the Hands – The Transformation of a Biblical Concept in Rabbinic Theology”, Minhah le-Nahum – Biblical and Other Studies Presented to Nahum M. Sarna in Honour of his 70th Birthday, ed. M. Brettler, M. Fishbane, London, (1993), pp. 117–132.

“Were Rashi’s Talmud Commentaries Indeed Unknown to Maimonides?”, Rashi, the Man and his Works (Heb.), ed. A. Grossman et al., The Zalman Shazar Center for Jewish History, Jerusalem 2008, pp. 403–464.
