= Sugya =

Literary unit of Talmudic discussion or story

A sugya is a self-contained passage of the Talmud that typically discusses a mishnah or other rabbinic statement, or offers an aggadic narrative.; see Gemara § The Sugya for overview.

While the sugya is a literary unit in the Jerusalem Talmud, the term is most often used for passages in the Babylonian Talmud, which is the primary focus of religious and academic readings of sugyot (plural form).

Religious and academic scholars of Talmud have identified numerous sugyot, though there is no definitive listing or count. Individual sugyot have been explained for readers, taught as curricular units, and analyzed by historians and other scholars.

== Definition ==
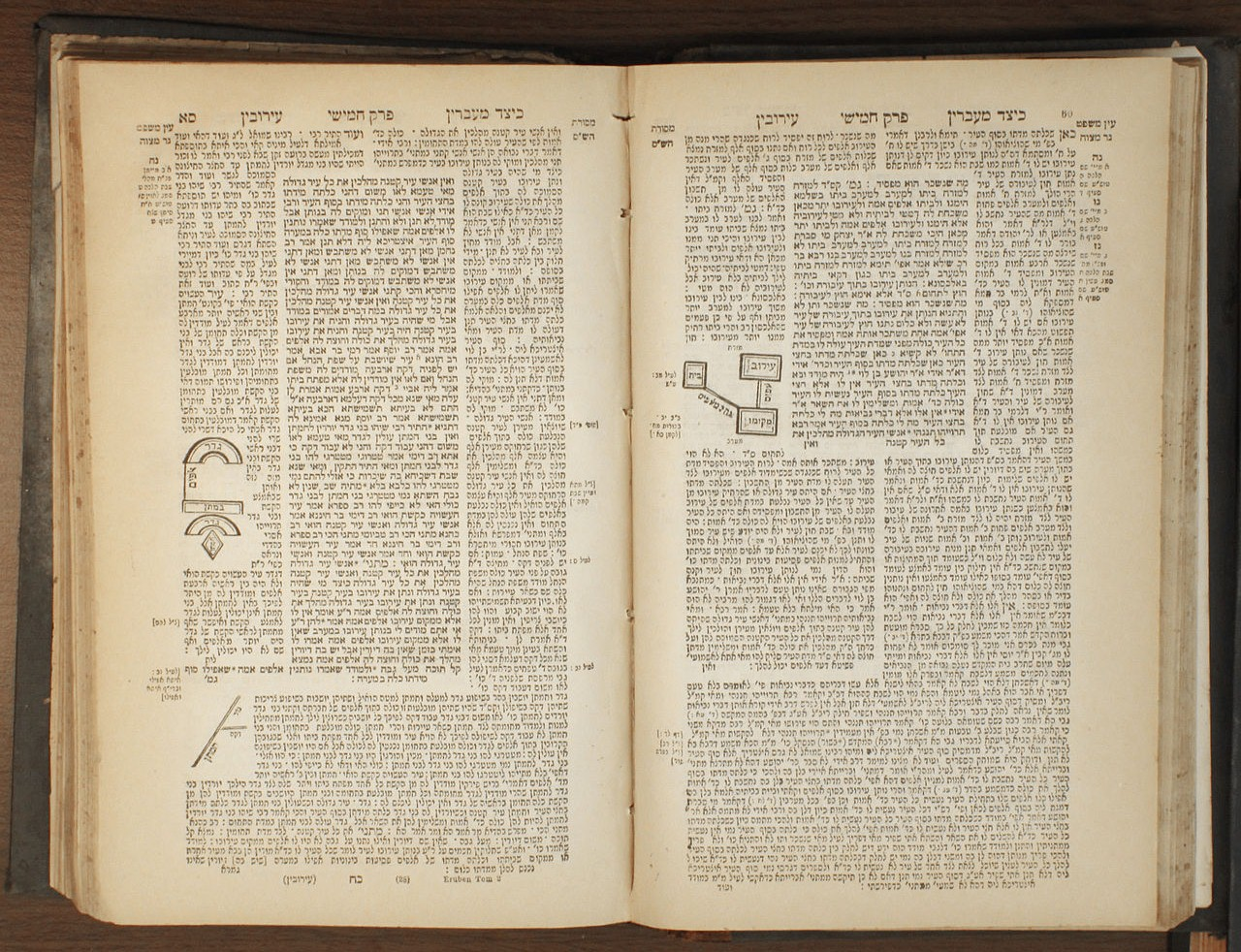
Pages from the Vilna Talmud, tractate Eruvin

The term sugya (pl. sugyot) is derived from the Aramaic segi (סגי), which means to go, and it refers to "a self-contained basic unit of Talmudic discussion". Sugya is also used in the Talmud for a narrower meaning, as the course or trend (lit. a "going") of a discussion. It may also refer to a lesson on rabbinic law (halakha) given in a rabbinical setting, such as a yeshiva.

Sugyot are sometimes marked in the Vilna edition of the Talmud by a colon, but not consistently or reliably. There are 2,711 pages of Talmud and 517 chapters, but the number of sugyot is not known. Scholars have methodically identified sugyot for selected chapters, for example: 42 sugyot in the 12 pages of Berakhot ch.1, 47 sugyot in 10 pages of Berakhot ch.7, 39 sugyot in 10 pages of Eruvin ch.10, 20 sugyot in 8 pages of Pesachim ch. 4, 12 sugyot in 3 pages of Sanhedrin ch.5, 19 sugyot in Shabbat ch.6, and 53 sugyot in 15 pages of two chapters in Sukkot.

== Types of sugya ==
A sugya is literary construct that puts together several sources. It includes commentary on a tannaitic statement, either the particular mishnah, which is the organizing topic for any given section of Talmud, or a baraita, which is also from the period of the tannaim rabbis (until about 200 CE). A sugya also builds upon amoraic statements (memra), attributed to intermediate generations of rabbis, or a brief unit known as an amoraic sugya, which presents a debate among amoraic rabbis. In the Babylonian Talmud, the sugyot are compositions, created by generations of editors, that are framed by an anonymous literary structure. This anonymous layer, or stam ha-Talmud, is associated by historians with the stammaim or savoraim rabbis (500-600 CE).

Sugyot vary in length, structure, and complexity. Some refer to other sugyot, which is a clue to their historical development, and some move blocks of text to a different chapter or tractate of the Talmud. The typical sugya presents an argument among rabbis, with a "give and take, proof and rejection, question and answer" style ("shakla v'tarya") that is structured by a Talmudic vocabulary. A sugya may also comprise or incorporate a Talmudic narrative, or other kind of aggadah. Starting in the 1970s, scholars recognized that the opening sugya to some Talmudic chapters (especially at the beginning of tractate, such as Kiddushin) had a peculiar character and literary structure, associated with a later stage of redaction and composition. Besides the textual analysis, Yaakov Elman stated that these opening sugyot may reflect the cultures of their time.

The Babylonian Talmud also has a "conceptual sugya" that analyzes in-depth a legal principle, which are usually not found in the Jerusalem Talmud or earlier documents. According to Leib Moscovitz, "Such passages generally analyze a group of tannaitic sources in light of the specified principle, which is assumed to apply to all the cases cited; these cases may be adduced either to support or to refute the relevant principle." Parallel sugyot also exist, not only between the two Talmuds, but also within the Babylonian Talmud corpus. In 1974, for example, Louis Jacobs examined four sugyot about efforts stymied by circumstances beyond one's control.

== Analysis of sugyot ==
=== Talmudic commentary ===
Rashi in the Talmud's "Rashi" script

Since the writing of the Babylonian Talmud can be terse and difficult to follow, Rashi and other medieval rabbis offer glosses and commentaries to explain the basic meaning and unfolding of each sugya. The next generation of commentary, the Tosafot, serve to deal with problems in the sugya (or its Rashi commentary), including inconsistencies with sugyot elsewhere in the Talmud. In rabbinic commentaries about the Talmud, some authors focus on less on the details of the text and more on the whole sugya. Rabbenu Hananel exemplifies this approach to elucidating a sugya.

=== Historical and literary analysis ===
The academic study of the sugya was influenced by a medieval history of the Talmud by Sherira ben Hanina, one of the 10th C. geonim, though eventually research pursued independent hypotheses.

In the early years of Jewish studies and Wissenschaft des Judentums, scholars accepted the traditionalist view that the sugya reflected the actual deliberations of ancient Talmudic academies. In the latter part of the 20th C., scholars uncovered the literary and redactional histories of the Babylonian Talmud and its sugyot. Hyman Klein pioneered the detection of historical layers by their linguistic features. Scholars came to recognize the "anonymous voice" of the Talmud as creative redactors with their own jargon, concepts in halakha, and "dialectical commentary".

To separate the layers in a given Babylonian sugya, research had to go beyond its internal features, linguistic or stylistic, and examine parallel texts, especially the sugyot of the Palestinian Talmud. In a detailed study of Babylonian use of the Palestinian Talmud, Alyssa Gray put 44 sugyot into 6 categories:

1. taking a sugya from the same mishnah in the same order,
2. building a sugya from texts marked by the Palestinian editors,
3. close parallel to the Palestinian Talmud sugya,
4. placing materials under a different mishnah in the tractate,
5. using same mishnah to present aggadic narrative, and
6. using the same mishnah to expand on Palestinian Talmud's writing that goes beyond previous tannaitic sources.

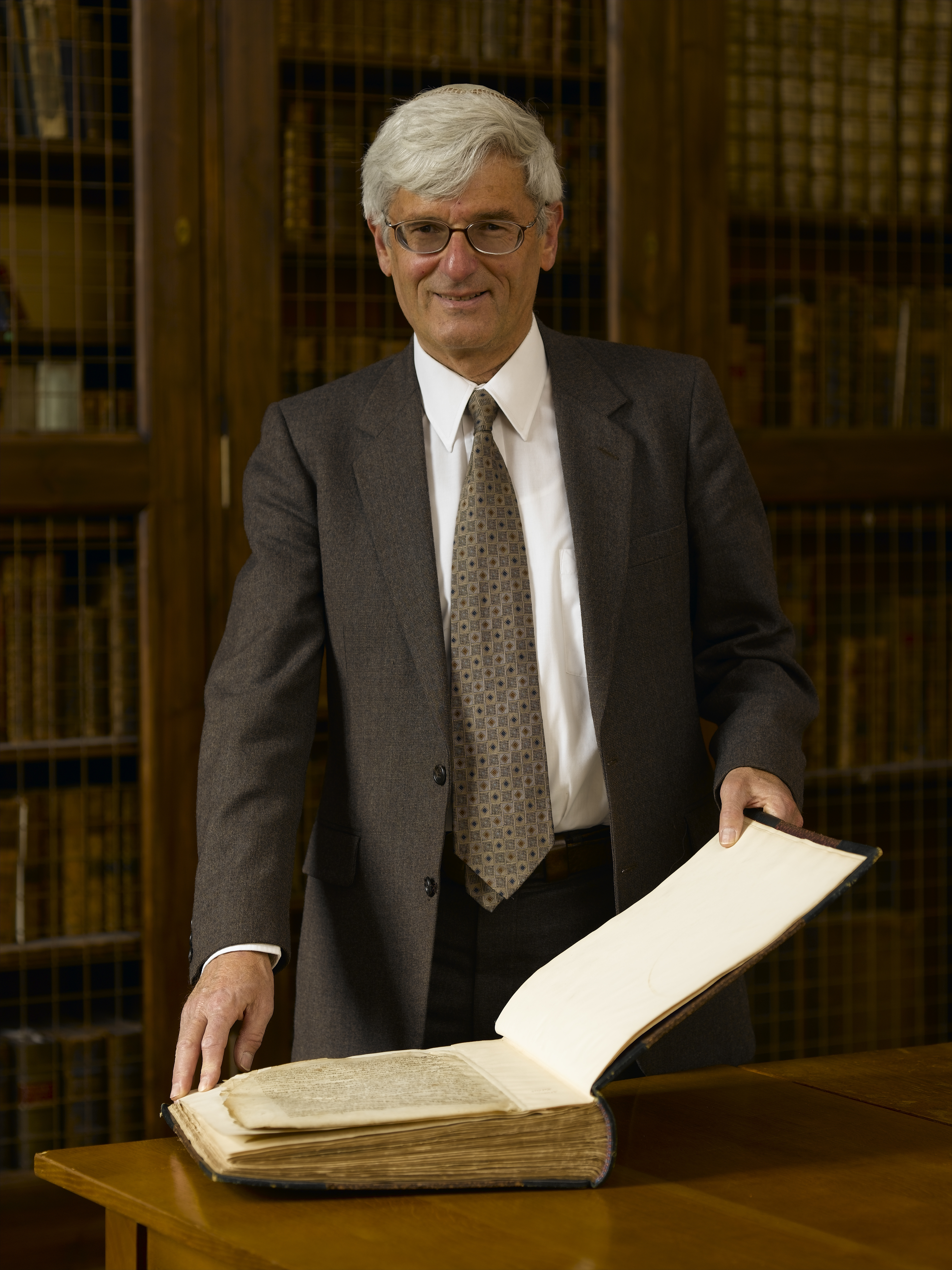
Shamma Friedman, expert on Talmudic sugyot

Indeed, the anonymous editors of the Babylonian Talmud did not merely build sugyot around the earlier statements attributed to amoraim, they reformulated the amoraic content, as Yaakov Sussman and Shamma Friedman found. Scholars have stated that elements of sugyot could have been invented as if written by earlier rabbis, the amoraim, as well as tannaitic statements emended by the redactors. Moreover, sugyot may be composed by drawing upon amoraic or even stammaitic texts from other, unrelated tractates. In a sugya, a halakhah (legal position) taken by the Mishnah, the layer of the tannaim, may be significantly reinterpreted by amoraim associated with the Gemara of the Talmud. This reinterpretation may, in turn, again have been reworked by the anonymous stammaim into a quite different legal ruling, as Kulp and Rogoff show with a sugya (Ketubot 80b) about a man taking a vow to excuse himself from a religious obligation.

Within a sugya, there may be variant presentations of a Talmudic argument. While once thought to be scribal errors, Eliezer Shimshon Rosenthal found that these are compositions, same content but expressed differently, were written in the 6-7th centuries, later than most of the Talmud. According to Talmudist Stephen G. Wald, the variant readings "reflect an attitude of relative freedom and independence toward the talmudic text, one which allows itself to rephrase or reformulate the language of the tradition... [and] represent authentic alternative traditions which were originally propagated at the very center of talmudic authority – the Babylonian yeshivot themselves."

According to Moscovitz, the anonymous editors also can be said to have recontextualized the amoraic material to generate quite new meanings. Along similar lines, Daniel Boyarin argued that these 5-6th Century redactors created an appealing historical background to their own rabbinic institutions by revising earlier legends into sugyot about Yohanan ben Zakkai and Yavne. The Babylonian Talmud thereby attributed the emphasis on prayer, the centrality of Talmud, and the theological foundations of later rabbinic Judaism to the legendary shift to a proto-rabbinic academy in Yavne. Boyarin also stated that this reflected "epistemic shifts within Christian culture."

=== Contemporary Jewish responses ===
The sugya may serve as the literary springboard to Jewish religious, literary, and philosophical expositions. Notably, Emmanuel Levinas learned with the mysterious Monsieur Chouchani and presented a series of nine Talmudic readings, starting in 1960, that interpreted and transformed each sugya into philosophical discourse. The sugyot are Bava Kamma 60a-b ("Damages Due to Fire"), Bava Metsia 83a-b ("Judaism and Revolution"), Berakhot 61a ("And God Created Woman"), Nazir 66a-b ("The Youth of Israel"), Sanhedrin 36b-37a ("As Old as the World?"), Sanhedrin 67a-68a ("Desacralization and Disenchantment"), Shabbat 88a-b ("The Temptation of Temptation"), Sotah 34b-35a ("Promised Land or Permitted Land"), Yoma 85a-85b ("Toward the Other")

An expert on sugyot, Judith Hauptman, wrote a book that interprets the layers of Talmudic views, tannaitic and amoraic, as reflecting a proto-feminist approach, a "growing sympathy for women" that resulted in improvements in Jewish law, creating a "more nuanced patriarchy than is generally assumed." The book's topics include inheritance, rape and seduction, the sotah (wife accused of infidelity), and the menstrual purity regulations known as niddah. Aviva Richman analyzes a sugya by melding the religious, "devotional" reading of the Talmud with the "relativistic" methodology of modern historical criticism. The sugya (Ketubot 51b) considers whether a sex act that began as coercion by the man, yet ends up with the woman's consent, and Richman states that the anonymous redactors were handling disputed stances on female sexuality and ensuring that "the female subject is part of the Talmud's theorizing of the self." In a multi-volume series, Noam Zion presented and examined Talmudic Marital Dramas. Overall, the series covers 23 Babylonian Talmud sugyot, one in the Palestinian Talmud, and four from collections of midrash.

== Noteworthy sugyot ==
Jon Levinsohn, a Jewish studies professor, solicited input and compiled an ad hoc list of 66 important sugyot. Those that received multiple mentions are:

- Avodah Zarah 17b-18b: the execution of Haninah ben Teradion
- Berakhot 5a-b: sickness and suffering
- Berakhot 19b-20a: when divine commands threaten human dignity
- Berakhot 35a: blessings (berakhah) for benefits from God's world
- Berakhot 35b: Torah study and livelihood
- Bava Metzia 21a-22b: Is it possible to acquire lost property?
- Bava Metzia 59b: the Oven of Akhnai
- Eruvin 13b: Elu ve-elu, these and those are the words of the living God (Eruvin 13b)
- Gittin 56a: Yohanan ben Zakkai's escape from Jerusalem
- Hagigah 14b: the Pardes (legend)
- Pesachim 108a, 116a: the Passover Seder
- Sanhedrin 74a-b: three cardinal sins requiring self-sacrifice in Jewish law

In his introduction to the Talmud, Rabbi Adin Steinsaltz cited Shabbat 66b to exemplify a sugya on a theme and Sanhedrin 33a for a sugya that derives rabbinic law from tannaitic statements. Other sample passages include Berakhot 2a-3a (in Holtz), Kiddushin 31b on honoring parents (in Schiffman). Among the sugyot highlighted in academic research, a notable example is the sugya (or series of sugyot) analyzed by Shamma Friedman, who identified the structure and compositional layers created by the anonymous editors of the Babylonian Talmud, the stammaim. While Friedman focused on legal texts, he also found "creative editorial reworking" throughout the Talmud. David Weiss Halivni also conducted extensive source criticism and form criticism of Talmudic sugyot, as in his Mekorot u-Mesorot volumes, with his analysis of Bava Batra (civil law) sugyot most accessible to English readers. Jeffrey Rubenstein's work on the aggadic sugyot began with the sugya on the destruction of the Second Temple in Gittin (which leads into ben Zakkai's escape, noted above), a popular reading for the somber fast day of Tisha b'Av.

Moscovitz analyzed an extensive conceptual sugya (at Sanhedrin 47b–48b) about the legal principle of designation (hazmanah), such as setting aside an object for Temple offerings. He concludes that the sugya was constructed to handle earlier discussions in the Palestinian Talmud, to "display intellectual virtuosity" with legal and conceptual problems, and for literary purposes. He considers the sugya "a literary and conceptual tour de force that reflects rabbinic conceptual thought and [Babylonian Talmud] compositional and redactional techniques at their most sophisticated." The afikoman of the Passover Seder is the subject of a sugya (Pesachim 119b-120a) analyzed by Kulp and Rogoff, listed by Levisohn, and mentioned in popular Jewish media. Likewise, the lulav of the festival Sukkot is the topic of a sugya in academic and popular Jewish discourse.

in 2019, folklore scholar Dina Stein examined a sugya (Nedarim 66a-b) about rabbis who overrode the vows that husbands made toward their wives. According to Stein, the sugya tells four stories that convey the institutional power of language—vows and their annulment—with women as linguistic figures in a patriarchal discourse. In the comic fourth episode, with plays on the vocabulary of the Babylonian husband and Palestinian wife, a rabbi's speech acts approve the wife's conduct. Drawing on Pierre Bourdieu's theory of symbolic power, Stein states that the sugya suggests that women "cannot fully be policed" while both language and women are negotiated by the husbands and rabbis, with the sugya itself aiming to prove that rabbis have the linguistic skills to maintain their dominance. Other sugyot that have earned scrutiny include Bava Kamma 2a on four categories of civil damage, Bava Kamma 31a-b on chain reaction accidents, Nazir 2b on identifying as a nazirite, and Yoma 82a on children fasting.

== See also ==
- The Heart Knows its Own Bitterness (Yoma 83a)
- Moses sees Rabbi Akiva (Menachot 29b)
- Three Oaths (Ketubot 111a)
