= Archisynagogue =

Ancient supervising officer of a synagogue

In ancient Judaism, an archisynagogue (Greek ἀρχισυνάγωγος; Hebrew ראש הכנסת; lit. "synagogue chief") was the officer who supervised matters pertaining to the religious services of the synagogue.

== Usage ==
Use of the term can be traced from the time of Jesus to about the year 300. It occurs several times in the New Testament.

The name is borrowed from the Greek, and was therefore used by Jews throughout the Roman Empire, but not by Jews in Babylonia. Hence, the Babylonian Talmud – when mentioning the archisynagogue – finds it necessary to translate the word by parnas.

== Role ==
The distinctive function of the archisynagogue was to select suitable men for the reading of the Law, the reciting of prayers, and for preaching; since in ancient times the synagogue did not have regularly appointed officers for the performance of these duties.

From the Jerusalem Talmud, it further appears that in cases of necessity the archisynagogue of a community had to act as its reader.

In consonance with the nature of his office, the archisynagogue was chosen for his piety and good moral character, while in the case of an archon the essential requirements were social position and influence. The Pharisees therefore regarded the archisynagogues as inferior only to the scholars (talmidei chachamim).

Like most of the offices of the Pharisaic Jews, that of the archisynagogue was not limited in time, but was usually held for life, and not infrequently was hereditary; the Pharisees holding that the son had a claim upon his father's office unless he had shown himself unworthy. This explains why the title "archisynagogue" was sometimes attached to the names of the wife and the children, as found on some Greek inscriptions. It was used, no doubt, to indicate that they were members of an archisynagogal family.

== See also ==
- Archipheracite, another past title in synagogues
