= Dhammacārī =

Dhammacari (Pali: Dhammacārī; lit., "one who follows the Dhamma") is a term used in some Theravada Buddhist communities to refer to lay devotees (upāsakas) who have seriously committed themselves to Buddhist practice for several years. Dhammacaris follow four training vows in addition to the traditional Five Precepts that all lay devotees follow.

Dhammacārī literally means a person who forms his or her thinking and behavior according to the Dhamma (Dharma). Dhamma is the knowledge that enhances the quality of life. It is the knowledge and understanding of the true nature of things: the knowledge that all things are causally conditioned. After realizing the causes and conditions of things one can generate a desired effect by changing the causes and conditions as necessary. This is the same principle that is used to improve things in science and technology. Dhammacārī applies this method to improve things related to human behavior.

A Dhammacārī (one who follows Dhamma) is committed to putting effort towards understanding how life works (Dhamma) and reforms the lifestyle and thinking patterns according to this understanding. The goal is the reduction of discomfort of life and becoming more and more effective in handling ups and downs of life. The Buddha has taught Dhamma in many different ways and his teachings help us to understand the many subtle details regarding the nature of life. Dhammacārī is convinced that learning the teaching of the Buddha makes learning “life” much easier.

== Dhammacārī Initiation ==
=== Ti-Sarana & Life-long Eight Precepts ===
• Namo Tassa Bhagavato Arahato Sammā Sambudhassa (3 times).

Homage to the blessed One, the Perfected One, the Fully Awakened One (3 times).

• Buddham Saranam Gacchāmi

I go to the Buddha for refuge.

• Dhammam Saranam Gacchāmi

I go to the Dhamma for refuge.

• Sangham Saranam Gacchāmi

I go to the Sangha for refuge.

• Dutiyampi Buddham Saranam Gacchāmi

For the second time, I go to the Buddha for refuge.

• Dutiyampi Dhammam Saranam Gacchāmi

For the second time, I go to the Dhamma for refuge.

• Dutiyampi Sangham Saranam Gacchāmi

For the second time, I go to the Sangha for refuge.

• Tatiyampi Buddham Saranam Gacchāmi

For the third time, I go to the Buddha for refuge.

• Tatiyampi Dhammam Saranam Gacchāmi

For the third time, I go to the Dhamma for refuge.

• Tatiyampi Sangham Saranam Gacchāmi

For the third time, I go to the Sangha for refuge.

=== Life-long Eight Precepts ===
• Pānātipātā veramanī, sikkhāpadam samādiyāmi.

I undertake the training step to abstain from taking life.

• Adinnādanā veramanī, sikkhāpadam samādiyāmi.

I undertake the training step to abstain from taking what is not given.

• Kāmesu micchācārā veramanī, sikkhāpadam samādiyāmi.

I undertake the training step to abstain from sexual misconduct.

• Musāvādā veramanī, sikkhāpadam samādiyāmi.

I undertake the training step to abstain from lying.

• Pisunāvācā veramanī, sikkhāpadam samādiyāmi.

I undertake the training step to abstain from divisive speech.

• Pharusāvācā veramanī, sikkhāpadam samādiyāmi.

I undertake the training step to abstain from harsh speech.

• Samphappalāpā veramanī, sikkhāpadam samādiyāmi

I undertake the training step to abstain from idle chatter.

• Micchā ājīvā veramanī, sikkhāpadam samādiyāmi.

I undertake the training step to abstain from wrong livelihood.

== The Meanings of Taking Refuge ==
=== Buddha ===
The term Buddha means ultimate human perfection, the perfection of insight and compassion. It is also the absence of fear and all other defects of the human mind. Any one can achieve Buddha-hood by using the correct method. Taking refuge in the Buddha means setting oneself in the direction of perfect wisdom and compassion.

=== Dhamma (Dharma) ===
Dhamma is the necessary information regarding the method that gradually leads us toward human perfection. After carefully verifying the accuracy of this method, all Buddhas make that information available to others for their benefit. Dhamma is the knowledge that is utilized and verified by individuals who seek to refine the quality of life. Taking refuge in Dhamma is committing oneself to study and practice it for the benefit of oneself and others.

=== Sangha ===
Sangha is the numerous men, women and children who have tested the method and proved that gradual improvement and final personal perfection is possible. They were average people who achieved perfect wisdom and compassion, by following Dhamma. They became free from sorrow, frustration, stress, fear, and other mental weaknesses that make life difficult. Taking refuge in the Sangha means looking up to them as role models.

== History ==
In the early 1990s Bhante Madawala Seelawimala of American Buddhist Seminary in West Sacramento and Bhante Walpola Piyananda of Dhamma Vijaya Buddhist Vihara in Los Angeles decided to establish this formal initiation ceremony to train future American Buddhist leadership.

Dhammacārī Initiation is designed to encourage the students of Dhamma to study and practice Dhamma deeply and more seriously. Additionally, they are encouraged to teach Dhamma School for children, give introductory talks on Buddhism, give public Dhamma talks on simple topics, conduct basic meditation sessions and organize Dhamma study groups. The American Buddhist Seminary may even certify Dhammacārīs who have the proper background and in-depth knowledge of Dhamma for Buddhist counseling.

== See also ==
- anagarika (lay attendant)
- bhikkhu (monk)
- samanera (novice monk)
- upāsaka (lay devotee)

== Sources ==
- Seelawimala, Madawala, Dhammacari Initiation Guidelines. West Sacramento: American Buddhist Seminary.
- Prebish, Charles S., and Kenneth K. Tanaka, editors The Faces of Buddhism in America. Berkeley: University of California Press, c1998 1998.
