= Archipheracite =

An archipheracite was a minister of Jewish synagogues, who were charged with reading and interpreting the perakim (chapters), where the titles and chapters of the law and the prophets are found.

The archipheracite was not the same as the archisynagogus, as Grotius and other have mistakenly believed, but rather the chief or principal of these appointed to read, explain, and profess the law in their schools.

The title is formed from the Greek prefix archi- "chief", and the Hebrew or Aramaic פרק, "pherak", division or chapter.
