= Protopriest =

Protopriest may refer to:

- Archpriest
- Protopriest of the College of Cardinals
