= Not in Heaven =

Phrase found in a Biblical verse, Deuteronomy 30:12

Not in Heaven (לֹ֥א בַשָּׁמַ֖יִם הִ֑וא, lo ba-shamayim hi) is a phrase found in a Biblical verse, Deuteronomy 30:12, which encompasses the passage's theme, and takes on additional significance in rabbinic Judaism.

The full verse states: "It is not in heaven, that you should say, 'Who will go up to heaven for us, and get it for us so that we may hear it and observe it?'" In general, the verse conforms with how "... the deuteronomic tradition believed its Torah to be an immediately accessible wisdom, neither distant nor wondrous."

== Jewish interpretations ==
The phrase "not in Heaven" is understood to justify human authority to interpret the Torah. The Talmud explains "[The Torah] is not in Heaven" to mean that the meaning of the Torah itself is to be uncovered not by prophets, or even God's miracles or words, but by humankind's interpretation and decision-making. In the story of the Oven of Akhnai, "Rabbi Yehoshua affirmed the independence of human interpretation from divine intervention since this is what God wills. In support he adduces the biblical statement that the Torah is 'not in heaven' (Deuteronomy 30:12)."

In the academic study of Jewish law, the verse "not in Heaven" serves as the Biblical grounding for the jurisprudential structure of halakhah (Jewish law). The source for Rabbinic authority is really from Deuteronomy 17:11 (According to the law which they shall teach you, and according to the judgment which they shall tell you, you shall do). As one author explains, thanks to the midrashic reading of the verse, "...God himself acquiesced in His exclusion from the halakhic process. Having revealed His will in Sinai in the grundnorm, He Himself, according to the Rabbinic explanation, entrusted the interpretation of His will to the Sages."

== See also ==
- Eliezer ben Hurcanus, against whom Rabbi Yehoshua cited "not in Heaven" on the case of The Oven of Akhnai

== Bibliography ==
- Maimonides. Mishneh Torah, Foundations of the Torah 9:1-4 (E.g., "it is said 'It is not in heaven' -- you thus learn that henceforth no prophet is authorized to innovate anything." Walzer p. 269)
- Berkovits, Eliezer. Not in Heaven: The Nature and Function of Halakhah. (NY, 1983) Cf. "Conversion and the Oral Law" reprinted in Essential Essays on Judaism (Jerusalem: Shalem Press, 2006).
- Boyarin, Daniel. "Old Wine in New Bottles: Intertextuality and Midrash." Poetics Today, 1987
- Gordis, Robert. The Dynamics of Judaism: A Study in Jewish Law. (Indiana UP:1990)
- JP Rosenblatt, JC Sitterson. Not in Heaven: Coherence and Complexity in Biblical Narrative (Indiana UP:1991)
- Walzer, et al. The Jewish Political Tradition: Authority (Yale 2000)
