= The Oven of Akhnai =

Talmudic story

The Oven of Akhnai is an aggadic story found in the Talmud at Bava Metzia 59a-b. The story concerns a debate which was held over the halakhic status of a new type of oven. In the course of the rabbinic disagreement, the story expresses differing views of the nature of law and authority, concerns over a fractured and divisive community, and the issue of harming another person through words and actions.

== Story ==
A new type of oven is brought before the Sanhedrin. The rabbis debate whether or not this oven is susceptible to ritual impurity. Rabbi Eliezer ben Hyrcanus argues that the oven is ritually pure, while the other rabbis, including the nasi Rabban Gamaliel, argue that the oven is impure. When none of Rabbi Eliezer's arguments convince his colleagues, he says that if he is right, the trees will give him a sign. At this point, the tree leaps from the ground and moves far away.

The other rabbis tell Rabbi Eliezer that the movement of the tree was not evidence of what he was arguing. Rabbi Eliezer then says if the halakha is according to him, an irrigation canal will give them a sign. The canal begins to flow backwards, but again the other rabbis are not convinced. Rabbi Eliezer cries out, "If the halakha is in accordance with my opinion, the walls of the study hall will prove it." The walls of the study hall begin to fall, but are then scolded by Rabbi Joshua ben Hananiah who reprimands the walls for interfering in a debate among scholars. Out of respect for Rabbi Joshua, they do not continue to fall, but out of respect for Rabbi Eliezer, they do not return to their original places.

In frustration, Rabbi Eliezer finally argues that if the halakha is according to his opinion, God himself will say so. God then speaks directly to the arguing rabbis, saying that Rabbi Eliezer's opinion is correct. Rabbi Joshua responds, "It [the Torah] is not in heaven". Upon hearing Rabbi Joshua's response, God smiled and stated, "My children have defeated me!"

== Interpretations ==
There are many different themes in the story of the Oven of Akhnai. Rabbi Joshua's response expresses the view that the work of Law is a work of human activity; the Torah is not a document of mystery which must have its innate meaning revealed by a minority, but it is instead a document from which law must be created through the human activity of debate and consensus – in quoting Deuteronomy, Joshua shows that the Torah itself supports this legal theory. Rabbinic literature was capable of recognizing differing opinions as having a degree of legitimacy (Yer. Ber. 3b), yet the community remains united and the ruling which is ultimately followed comes through proper jurisprudence. As such, Rabbi Eliezer's miraculous appeals represent a differing legal theory and were outside of proper jurisprudence which meant that they would not be followed. Instead, the Jewish community followed the ruling of the majority in this issue and in others.

In the backdrop of the story is the status of Judaism prior to Rabban Gamaliel and the views that developed among the late Pharisaic or early Rabbinic Jews. During the Second Temple period there existed numerous forms of Judaism. Jewish factions during the Second Temple period harshly denounced one another and sometimes were violent towards each other. Following the destruction of Jerusalem in 70 CE, the Rabbis pondered why the destruction occurred. The Rabbis concluded that the Second Temple was destroyed due to "baseless hate" (Yoma 9b). In their retelling of the destruction, they point to divisions and a lack of empathy for one another.

The Rabbis under Rabban Gamaliel sought to unify Judaism and end wanton sectarianism. Rabban Gamaliel's school recognized a degree of validity in varying statements, but chose to follow the more lenient philosophy of the school of Hillel. Jewish leaders like Rabban Gamaliel sought to create a cohesive Jewish community where major issues were settled, a system was in place to decide divisive issues, and minor issues could be tolerated. Rejection of this cooperation and an embrace of sectarianism was condemned in the strongest terms. Rabban Gamaliel himself was known to at times be too forceful in humiliating those who formed divisions.

According to Vered Noam, Rabbi Eliezer sought to reveal an innate halakhah based on revelation and he did not accept proper jurisprudence. In contrast, Rabban Gamaliel and the other rabbis sought to create halakhah through human reason and utilizing proper jurisprudence. Rabbi Eliezer expresses a differing philosophy regarding halakhah and a rejection of following the jurisprudence upon which a cohesive community relies. The dispute is not simply over an oven, but this is a story which reflects two conflicting ideas over the nature of law and possibilities for destabilizing of the community. Rabbi Gamaliel expresses his concerns when calming the storm, stating that the reason for his heavy-handed action was "so that disputes will not proliferate in Israel", the very same disputes which resulted in the destruction of Jerusalem in 70 CE.

At the same time, the story is introduced solely on the basis of a discussion of being careful not to hurt another individual through verbal interactions. Rabban Gamaliel may have had the correct intentions and his philosophies which were necessary for sustaining his community may have won out, yet he still hurt his colleagues through his words and decisions. While much focus is placed on the accuracy of Rabban Gamaliel's position or Rabbi Joshua's statement, the story in the Talmud does not overlook the fact that Rabban Gamaliel's draconian measures may have gone too far.

Scholar Jeffrey Rubenstein has argued that the Oven of Akhnai focuses on the fact that the majority need to take charge over the minority, but in a way that it is fair to all. The majority needs to work off the minority to attend the needs of everyone in the community. Yet, explains Rubenstein, the midrash says there is a limit to what the majority can do. People should not aim to cause someone to experience pain, but instead respect one another.

=== Geological interpretation ===
Geoarchaeologist Beverly Goodman and historian Henry Abramson theorize that the events mentioned in the story are a mythologized version of the effects of a tsunami in the area caused by the 115 Antioch earthquake.

=== Karaite interpretation ===
Karaites often use the story of the Oven of Akhnai as evidence of the Rabbis' hubris, in that they are willing to usurp divine authority and supplant it with their own. Thus, the story is a central polemic for Karaites' rejection of the authority of the Rabbinical oral law.

The Karaites structure their objections around three main points.

1. The Rejection of Divine Authority: In the story, Rabbi Eliezer calls upon miracles and a direct voice from God to validate his legal ruling. The Rabbinical sages dismiss these signs, arguing that human majority vote overrides divine intervention. Karaites argue that this demonstrates that the Rabbis place their own intellect and authority over that of God, and that the Rabbis – by declaring God has "no say" in interpreting his own laws – are engaging in blasphemous usurpation of divine sovereignty.
2. The Distortion of Scripture: Lo BaShamayim Hi (לֹ֥א בַשָּׁמַ֖יִם הִ֑וא), Deuteronomy 30:12, in its original context, emphasizes that the commandments are accessible, understandable and close to human hearts, and that no one has to "climb up to heaven" to retrieve them. Karaites point out that the Talmud distorts the original meaning of the verse to promote the exact opposite: that God has handed over the Torah to humans and no longer has any jurisdiction over its interpretation. Aharei Rabbim Lehatot (אַחֲרֵ֥י רַבִּ֖ים לְהַטֹּֽת), Exodus 23:2, is used by the Rabbis to establish majority rule in legal decisions. The full verse actually warns against following a majority to do evil or distort justice. ("You shall not follow a majority to do evil..."). Karaites view the Rabbinic reading of the phrase as a deliberate manipulation of the full verse, taken out of context by the Rabbis in order to invert its original meaning and grant themselves absolute legislative power.
3. The Myth of Rabbinic Infallibility: At the end of the story, Elijah the Prophet reveals that God smiled and said, "My children have defeated Me." Karaites dismiss this as a self-serving statement. They argue that the Rabbis invented the story of God rubber-stamping Rabbinic autonomy in order to deceive the Jewish masses into accepting their human-made decrees as if they were divine commandments.

== Influence ==
The Oven of Akhnai is one of the best known stories in the Talmud. As a result of the story, the phrase, "Lo Bashamayim Hi", לֹ֥א בַשָּׁמַ֖יִם הִיא or, "Not in Heaven", is well known among Jews. The phrase and story helps to reflect the Jewish view of law, the feasibility of following the Torah, and the importance of every generation to work to understand the Torah.

The story of the Oven of Akhnai is also notable in being one of the stories where a woman is mentioned having learned Torah and expressing her understandings.
