= Celestial marriage =

Mormon doctrine that marriage can last forever in heaven

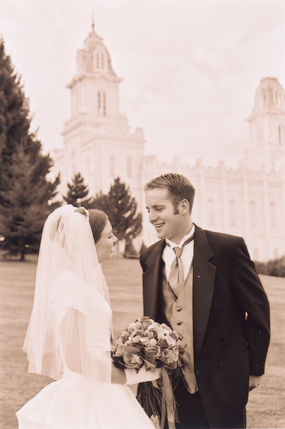
A couple following their sealing in the Manti Utah Temple

Celestial marriage, also called the New and Everlasting Covenant of Marriage, Eternal Marriage (synonymized after 1890), or Temple Marriage, is the doctrine that marriage can last forever in heaven, taught in the Church of Jesus Christ of Latter-day Saints (LDS Church) and branches of Mormon fundamentalism.

== In the LDS Church ==
LDS Church leaders teach that family relationships can continue beyond death via the sealing ordinance. Today, the church commonly uses the term “celestial marriage” to refer to a monogamous union sealed in a temple for time and all eternity. However, throughout most of the 19th century, church leaders consistently taught that “celestial marriage” was synonymous with polygamy as described in Doctrine and Covenants section 132. The ordinance is associated with a covenant that takes place inside temples by those authorized to hold the sealing power. The only people allowed to enter the temple, be married there, or attend these sealings are those who hold an official temple recommend. Obtaining a temple recommend requires one to abide by LDS Church doctrine and be interviewed and considered worthy by their bishop and stake president. A prerequisite to contracting an eternal marriage, in addition to obtaining a temple recommend, involves undergoing the temple endowment, which involves making covenants of obedience and devotion to God.

To receive the promised blessings of the sealing covenant, one must fulfill his or her promise to be obedient to all the Lord's commandments, including living a clean chaste life, abstaining from any impure thing, and being willing to sacrifice and consecrate all that one has for the Lord. In the marriage ceremony, a man and a woman make covenants to God and to each other and are said to be sealed as husband and wife for time and all eternity. The religion, citing Matthew 16:19 and Matthew 18:18, distinguishes itself from some other religious traditions by emphasizing that marriage relationships and covenants made in this life in the temple will continue to be valid in the next life, if the couple abides by these covenants.

In the 19th century, the term “celestial marriage” was essentially synonymous with polygamy (called plural marriage), which many leaders taught was required for exaltation in the highest degree of the celestial kingdom. New polygamous unions were publicly discontinued in the LDS Church with the 1890 Manifesto (though sealings did continue), the 1904 Second Manifesto, and the 1933 Third Manifesto. Existing plural marriages continued into the mid-20th century. The term “celestial marriage” is still used in the polygamous sense by some Mormon fundamentalist denominations which branched from the LDS Church.

In the LDS Church today, a man may enter a celestial marriage and be sealed to multiple women: if he divorces his most recent wife he must receive a sealing clearance, if his most recent wife dies however he does not need a sealing clearance to be sealed to another woman. A man may be sealed to a deceased wife if she was not sealed to another man, or all her husbands are deceased, he must also receive written consent from his current wife if she is alive. A woman on the other hand may only be sealed to one husband at a time, and if she divorces, she must receive a cancellation of that sealing (even if he dies) before being sealed to another man during her lifetime. A living woman who is not currently married or sealed to another man may be sealed to a deceased husband from whom she was divorced in life. She must first receive signed consent from her former husband’s widow (if there is one). Sealing cancellations and sealing clearences both must be granted by the First Presidency.

Many Latter-day Saints believe that all these sealings will be valid in the eternities, allowing the husband and all sealed wives to live together in the celestial kingdom. In 1998, the LDS Church changed its policy and now allows women to be sealed to more than one man after her death, though not simultaneously while living. A woman may be sealed to only one husband at a time while alive, and may only be sealed to subsequent partners after she has died. Proxy sealings, like proxy baptisms, are offered to the person in the afterlife. According to church teachings, the celestial marriage covenant, as with other covenants, requires the continued righteousness of the couple to remain in effect after this life. If only one remains righteous, that person is promised a righteous eternal companion in eternity.

== New Testament ==
In Matthew 22:28–30, Jesus is asked about the continuing state of marriage after death and he replies that after the resurrection of the dead, "people will neither marry nor be given in marriage; they will be like the angels in heaven." Mormons do not interpret Jesus' statement as meaning "that marriages will not exist after the Resurrection, but that marriages will not be performed after the Resurrection; for all questions of marital status must be settled before that time." Thus, Mormons believe that only mortals can be the subject of an eternal marriage ordinance; mortals may receive the ordinance for themselves or by proxy for those who have already died.

== Sealing ==
Celestial marriage is an instance of the LDS Church doctrine of sealing. Following a celestial marriage, not only are the couple sealed as husband and wife, but children born into the marriage are also sealed to that family. In cases where the husband and wife have been previously married civilly and there are already children from their union, the children accompany their parents to the temple and are sealed to their parents following the marriage ceremony.

LDS Church members believe that through this sealing, the family, constituted of a man, wife, and children will live together forever, if obedient to God's commandments.

== Relationship to plural marriage ==
During the 19th century, leaders of the LDS Church consistently used the terms “celestial marriage,” “patriarchal marriage,” and “the new and everlasting covenant of marriage” to refer specifically to plural marriage. Early church leaders, such as Brigham Young, Orson Pratt, John Taylor, George Q. Cannon, and others, taught that “celestial marriage” in Doctrine and Covenants section 132 referred exclusively to polygamy and that plural marriage was required for exaltation in the highest degree of the celestial kingdom. They used this terminology in public sermons, private writings, and official church publications well before 1890.

When Doctrine and Covenants 132 was recorded in 1843, the Revelation introduced polygamy by referencing biblical figures with multiple wives (e.g., Abraham, David, and Solomon) and used the term “new and everlasting covenant” to mean plural marriage. The text also admonished believers that rejecting this covenant would result in damnation, while its acceptance was portrayed as essential for full exaltation. Leaders taught that those who did not enter plural marriage in life but were willing to accept it, if God provided the opportunity, could still receive the highest celestial blessings; but they continually equated “celestial marriage” with plural marriage until the church began renouncing the practice under intense legal pressure from the U.S. government.

Beginning with the 1890 Manifesto, issued by Wilford Woodruff, the LDS Church publicly ended the practice of polygamy and gradually redefined “celestial marriage” to mean eternal monogamous marriage performed in the temple. In official statements from the early 20th century onward, church leaders declared that “celestial marriage” included any lawful temple sealing of a husband and wife for eternity, omitting the earlier insistence that multiple wives were essential for the highest exaltation.

=== Doctrinal dispute ===
Mormon fundamentalists maintain that the 19th-century usage of “celestial marriage” as plural marriage remains the intended and unalterable meaning of D&C 132. They argue that the church’s post-Manifesto reinterpretation of “celestial marriage” to mean “eternal monogamous marriage” departs from the original revelation and practice. By contrast, the LDS Church teaches that while plural marriages of the 19th century were understood to be forms of celestial marriage, the eternal covenant of marriage now refers exclusively to monogamous unions sealed in the temple.

Although the LDS Church stands by its post-1890 definitions, multiple historians have documented that early church authorities, including Joseph Smith, Brigham Young, John Taylor, and Orson Pratt, equated “celestial marriage” solely with plural marriage prior to the Manifesto. Thus, the doctrinal shift regarding the meaning of “celestial marriage” remains a point of contention between Mormon fundamentalists and the modern LDS Church.

== Swedenborg ==
Christian theologian Emanuel Swedenborg taught in his 1750s book Heaven and Hell that marriage will exist after death, but not procreation. Presiding Bishop of the LDS Church Edward Hunter recounted that Joseph Smith told him he believed Swedenborg "had a view of the world to come", and LDS historian D. Michael Quinn wrote that Smith was influenced by Swedenborg's teachings. Swedenborg's teachings spawned several Swedenborgian branches of Christianity.

== See also ==
- Posthumous marriage in Mormonism
