= Covenant in Mormonism =

In the Latter Day Saint movement, a covenant is a promise made between God and a person or a group of people. God sets the conditions of the covenant, and as the conditions are met, he blesses the person who entered into and kept the covenant. If the covenant is violated, blessings are withheld and in some cases a penalty or punishment is inflicted.

Latter Day Saint leaders teach that just as the God of Israel asked the children of Israel to be a covenant people, "a peculiar treasure unto me ... a kingdom of priests, and an holy nation," today God has asked for a latter-day people who will make and keep covenants with him. All covenants are considered part of the overarching "new and everlasting covenant" of the gospel.

The Church of Jesus Christ of Latter-day Saints (LDS Church) teaches that one enters a covenant through a ritual or a visible sign. Some leaders have taught that a covenant is always associated with an ordinance. Other leaders have suggested that commandments that include promised blessings for compliance—such as the law of tithing and Word of Wisdom—also constitute covenants.

In the LDS Church, ordinances which are accompanied by covenants include baptism and confirmation; reception of the Melchizedek priesthood; the temple endowment; and celestial marriage. These are known as "saving ordinances" and are a requirement for exaltation.

Officially, partaking of the sacrament is considered by the LDS Church to be a renewal of the covenants made at baptism; however, some Latter-day Saint leaders have taught that doing so constitutes a renewal of all covenants a person has made.

== Table of covenants associated with saving ordinances ==
Saving ordinance	Action required	Promised blessings
Baptism and Confirmation	Sincere repentance; take upon the name of Christ; serve Him and keep his commandments; be willing to bear others' burdens, mourn with those who mourn, and comfort those who stand in need of comfort; stand as a witness of Jesus in all times and in all places; always remember Him	Sins are forgiven; presence of the Holy Ghost; come forth in first resurrection; receive eternal life
Receiving the Melchizedek priesthood (required for men only)	Be faithful to receive the Aaronic and Melchizedek priesthoods; magnify assigned calling	Sanctified by the Spirit unto the renewing of the body; become the son of Moses and Aaron and the seed of Abraham; receives all that God has; exaltation
Endowment	Obedience; sacrifice everything for Christ and the church; chastity; consecrate time, talents, and possessions to the building up of the church and the establishment of Zion; keep key words, signs, and tokens learned in the temple confidential	Admission into the presence of God; exaltation
Celestial marriage	Love spouse with heart, might, mind and strength; keep other commandments	Come forth in first resurrection; inherit thrones, kingdoms, principalities, and powers, dominions, all heights and depths; name written in Lamb's Book of Life; exaltation; continuation of the seeds forever and ever; godhood; all power
