= Tithing in Mormonism =

Commandment in the Latter Day Saint movement

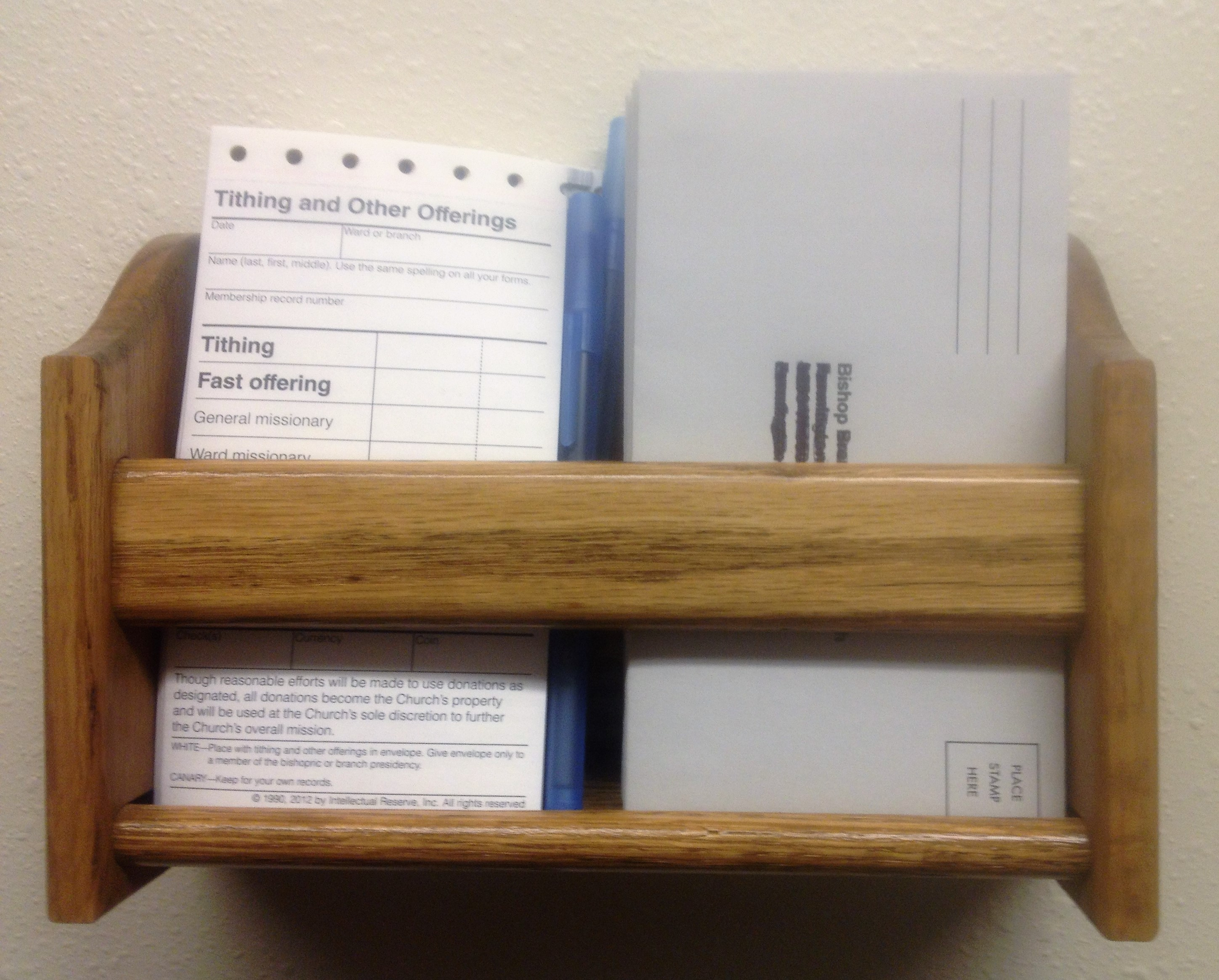
Tithing forms and envelopes used in the LDS Church

Tithing is a commandment accepted by various churches in the Latter Day Saint movement. In practicing tithing, adherents make willing tithe donations, usually ten percent of their income, to their church. It is based on both the biblical practice of paying tithes and modern revelation given to Joseph Smith and his accepted successors. For many of these churches, the law of tithing replaced or supplemented the law of consecration. The Church of Jesus Christ of Latter-day Saints (LDS Church) emphasized tithing in the 1900s and 1960s to assist in paying church debts.

== Background and origin ==
Joseph Smith and Oliver Cowdery made a covenant on November 29, 1834, in which they promised to give a tenth of all that they received to the poor in the church. However, during the early history of the Church of Christ, most Latter Day Saints understood the scriptural word "tithing" as any amount of consecrated goods or money. For example, in 1837, Presiding Bishop Edward Partridge and his counselors defined "tithing" as two percent of a household's annual net worth.

While in Far West, Missouri, Smith stated he received a revelation commanding his followers to build up a holy city Zion and construct another temple. Faced with the future financial burden that this commandment would create, Smith gathered several church leaders on July 8, 1838, and prayed to know how much property God required for tithing. The answer that Smith stated he received is recorded in Doctrine and Covenants, which describes three types of tithing, including "all their surplus property", "all those who gather unto ... Zion shall be tithed", and "one tenth of all their interest annually."

The revelation states that the original purpose of the surplus property was "For the building of mine house, and for the laying of the foundation of Zion and for the priesthood, and for the debts of the Presidency of my Church." Additionally, it warned that "if my people observe not this law, to keep it holy ... behold, verily I say unto you, it shall not be a land of Zion unto you."

After Smith received this revelation on tithing, he assigned Brigham Young to collect the Latter Day Saints' "surplus property". Smith did not define the phrase "surplus property", instead allowing the people to judge for themselves. In November 1841, the Quorum of the Twelve stated that "surplus property" would mean "one-tenth." Modern scholars disagree on whether this original provision was only applicable under the law of consecration. After Smith's death and the resulting succession crisis, various factions of the Latter Day Saint movement developed their own tithing practices.

== LDS Church ==
The LDS Church is the largest branch of the Latter Day Saint movement, with membership estimated at 16.6 million as of December 31, 2020. The LDS Church was estimated to have received tithing donations totaling between $7 billion and $33 billion USD in the year 2012 (equivalent to $9.6 billion to $45.2 billion in 2024).

=== Historical and modern definitions ===
Tithing is defined in LDS scripture as one-tenth of one's annual interest. According to Partridge, who was with Joseph Smith when he received the revelation for tithing, the amount is to be calculated as one tenth of the interest you would have received on your net worth.

The LDS Church today teaches that tithing is ten percent of one's annual income. It is left to each member to determine what constitutes "income".

=== History ===
The adoption of tithing and fast offerings as the economic foundation of the LDS Church marked a shift from the earlier communal period of the law of consecration to a system designed for economic stability. During the early Utah period of church history, tithing could be paid in various forms. "Property tithing" included all property that one owned upon time of conversion. This form of tithing was renewed in the September 1851 conference because of unsatisfactory returns. "Labor tithing" was a donation of every tenth day devoted for working on church projects. Tithing could be paid in its original form, such as in livestock, produce, or slaves. Donations in the form of United States currency, local scrip currency, or gold dust were also accepted.

The LDS Church entered a debt crisis following the panic of 1893. Lorenzo Snow became the church's president in 1898 and worked to solve the church's money problems. With tithing donations declining, Snow traveled to southern Utah in 1899 and urged members to pay tithing. He returned to Salt Lake City and continued preaching its importance to church leaders, causing tithing revenues to increase. Snow's successor in the presidency, Joseph F. Smith, continued emphasis on tithing. The LDS Church paid off all its debts by the end of 1906. In 1907, Joseph F. Smith taught that the church would one day no longer have the need to ask for tithing donations as it built its wealth. In 1908, the First Presidency and the Presiding Bishopric reformed the tithing process by deprecating the use of the church-issued scrip currency and shifting entirely to a cash-based system.

During the early 1950s, the LDS Church launched a building program and soon entered another financial crisis, deficit spending an annual amount of $32 million by the end of 1962. Apostle N. Eldon Tanner halted the church's building program in 1963 to build up a financial "buffer reserve". At this time, church leaders worked to re-emphasize the principle of tithing.

In 2015, the LDS Church announced a new system to allow members to pay their tithing and other donations online. This change was met with gratitude from local church members as it streamlined the donation process and reduced the workload of local lay leaders.

=== Purpose and methods of collection ===
The LDS Church uses tithing funds for building and maintaining temples and meetinghouses. It is also used to fund the church's missionary and education efforts. All expenditures are authorized by the Council on the Disposition of the Tithes.

Tithing donations collected within the United States are sent to the LDS Church's headquarters in Salt Lake City. Funds collected outside the United States generally stay within their country of origin to avoid long shipping times and foreign exchange fees. In 2015, the church began accepting tithes and other offerings online from members in the United States.

Early church officers were paid from tithing money. In April 1896, the First Presidency attempted to end salaries for "any one but the Twelve." Today, the LDS Church operates at the local level by an unpaid lay ministry. According to Gordon B. Hinckley, church general authorities today are given a "living allowance" taken from the church's business income.

=== Tithing in interviews ===
==== Tithing declaration ====
During the Utah period of church history, tithing settlement interviews were annually scheduled on December 31. Members would account their tithes to their bishop and tithing clerk. If the tithing donation amount was less than the expected amount, they were expected to explain how they would make up the deficit. An overpayment in tithing was carried over and deducted from the following year's expected amount.

Today, the bishop or branch president schedules an annual tithing declaration meeting with each member of his ward or branch. In the interview, church members declare their status as tithe-payers, and the leader records this on the church records.

==== Temple ordinance eligibility ====
In order to qualify for temple ordinances necessary for exaltation, paying a full tithe is a requirement, regardless of one's temporal circumstances. Tithes play a role in the eligibility interviews for a temple recommend which is a required document to participate in temple rites. One's status as a tithe payer has been listed as a standard of temple worthiness since the Nauvoo Temple period. As of 2023 the church's General Handbook requires bishops who interview members for temple recommends to ask members if they are currently full tithe payers, though provisions can be made if members promise to pay tithing at a later date.

== Community of Christ ==
The Community of Christ (previously known as the Reorganized Church of Jesus Christ of Latter Day Saints) is the second-largest branch of the Latter Day Saint movement, with membership estimated at 250,000 as of 2008.

New converts are expected to prepare an inventory to establish their net worth. Their initial tithing entails a tenth of this net worth, which can be paid at any time. Members then pay their tithing annually, calculated by taking their gross income, subtracting their "basic living needs" and turning over to the church 10% of the remainder. The Community of Christ defines tithing as "offerings to support local, mission center, and worldwide church ministries." Such offerings may include 10% or more of one's income, though poorer members can give any desired amount.

== Church of Jesus Christ (Cutlerite) ==
Cutlerites, a small sect with less than 20 members as of 2010, do not practice the law of tithing. They instead practice the United Order, the ideal of "all things common" taught in the early Latter Day Saint church. Cutlerites do not believe that Joseph Smith ever authored the section of the Doctrine and Covenants that mandates tithing, claiming that it was never presented to the membership until after Smith's death.

== Church of Zion ==
The Church of Zion (Godbeites, active circa 1870 to 1890) sought to reform Mormon tithing practices by basing it on one's annual accumulated income. When the principle was announced, the movement's founder William S. Godbe stated that he hoped they eventually would not need a law of tithing.

== See also ==
- Finances of The Church of Jesus Christ of Latter-day Saints
- The Windows of Heaven (film)
