= Tithe =

Religious donation

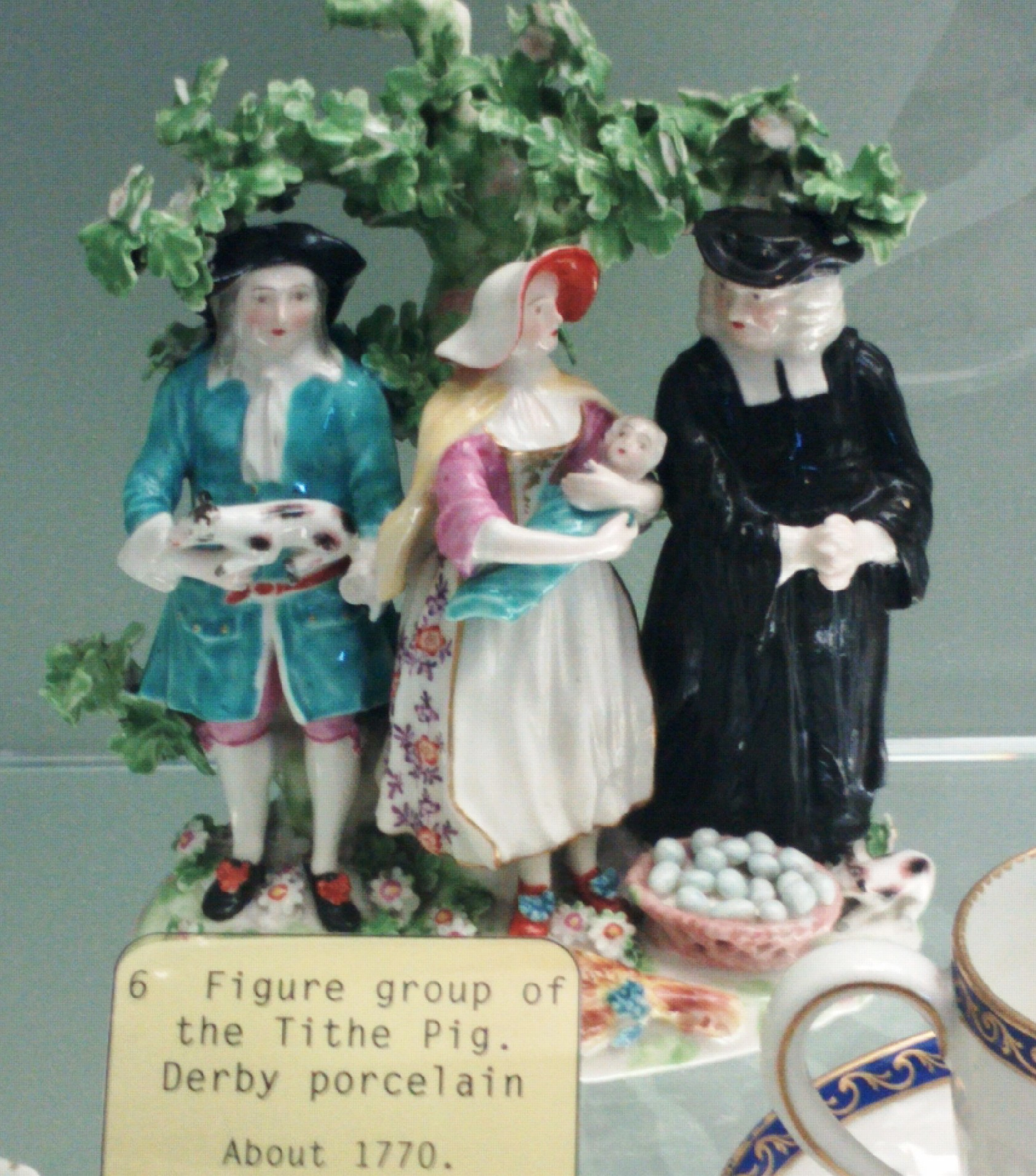
The Tithe Pig, group in Derby Porcelain, c. 1770

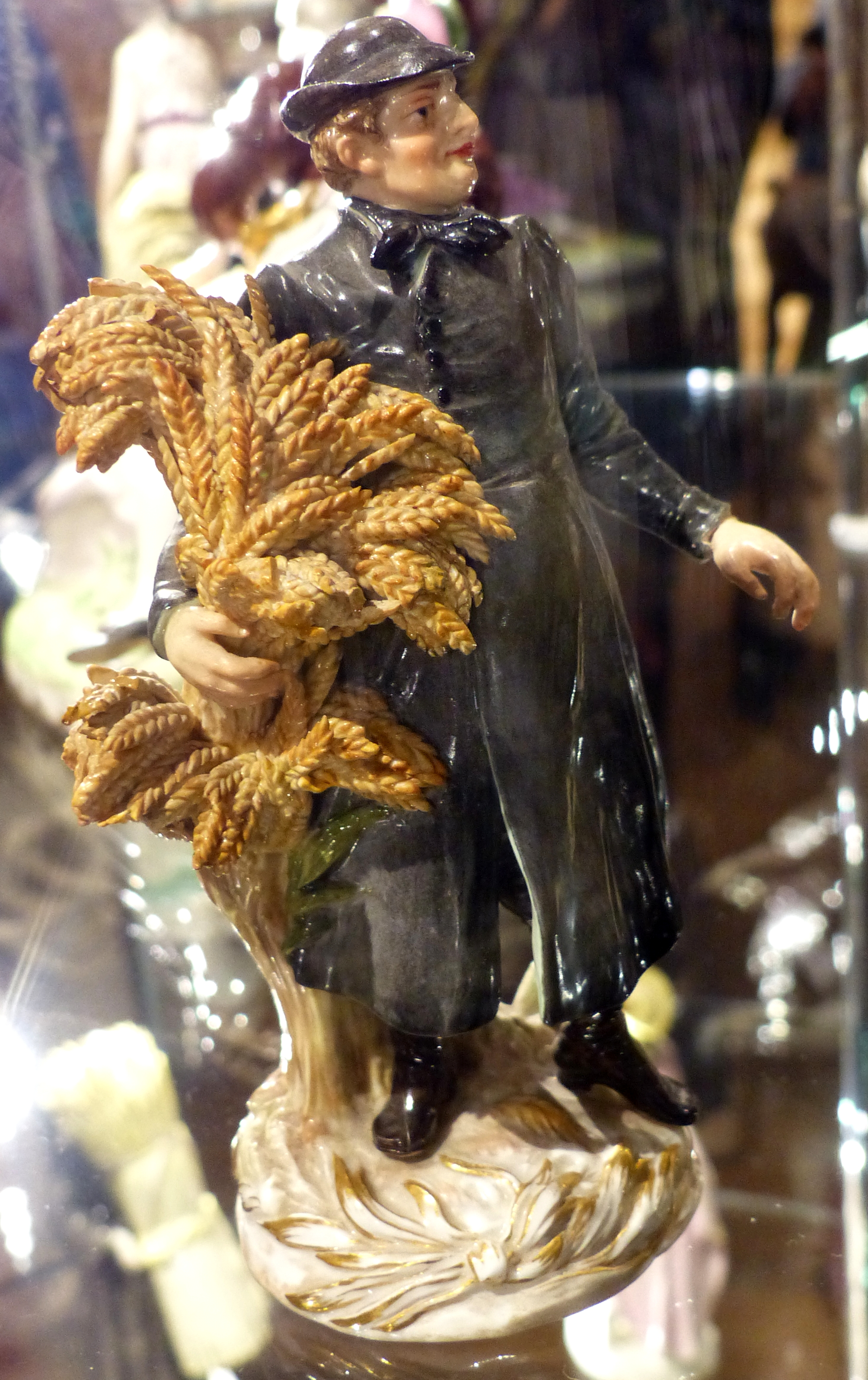
Porcelain figure of a priest collecting the tithe (Austria)

A tithe (/taɪð/; from Old English: teogoþa "tenth") is a one-tenth part of something, paid as a contribution to a religious organization or compulsory tax to government. Modern tithes are normally voluntary and paid in cash, cheques or via online giving, whereas historically tithes were required and paid in kind, such as agricultural produce. Church tax linked to the tax system are used in many countries to support their national church. Donations to the church beyond what is owed in the tithe, or by those attending a congregation who are not members or adherents, are known as offerings, and often are designated for specific purposes such as a building program, debt retirement, or mission work.

Many Christian denominations hold Jesus taught that tithing must be done in conjunction with a deep concern for "justice, mercy and faithfulness" (cf. Matthew 23:23). Tithing was taught at early Christian church councils, including the Council of Tours in 567, as well as the Third Council of Mâcon in 585. Tithing remains an important doctrine in many Christian denominations, such as the Congregational churches, Methodist Churches and Seventh-day Adventist Church. Some Christian Churches, such as those in the Methodist tradition, teach the concept of Storehouse Tithing, which emphasizes that tithes must be prioritized and given to the local church, before offerings can be made to apostolates or charities.

Traditional Jewish law and practice has included various forms of tithing since ancient times. Orthodox Jews commonly practice ma'aser kesafim (tithing 10% of their income to charity). In modern Israel, some religious Jews continue to follow the laws of agricultural tithing, e.g., ma'aser rishon, terumat ma'aser, and ma'aser sheni.

== Ancient Near East ==
None of the extant extrabiblical laws of the Ancient Near East deal with tithing, although other secondary documents show that it was a widespread practice in the Ancient Near East. William W. Hallo (1996) recognises comparisons for Israel with its ancient Near Eastern environment; however, as regards tithes, comparisons with other ancient Near Eastern evidence is ambiguous, and Ancient Near Eastern literature provides scant evidence for the practice of tithing and the collection of tithes.

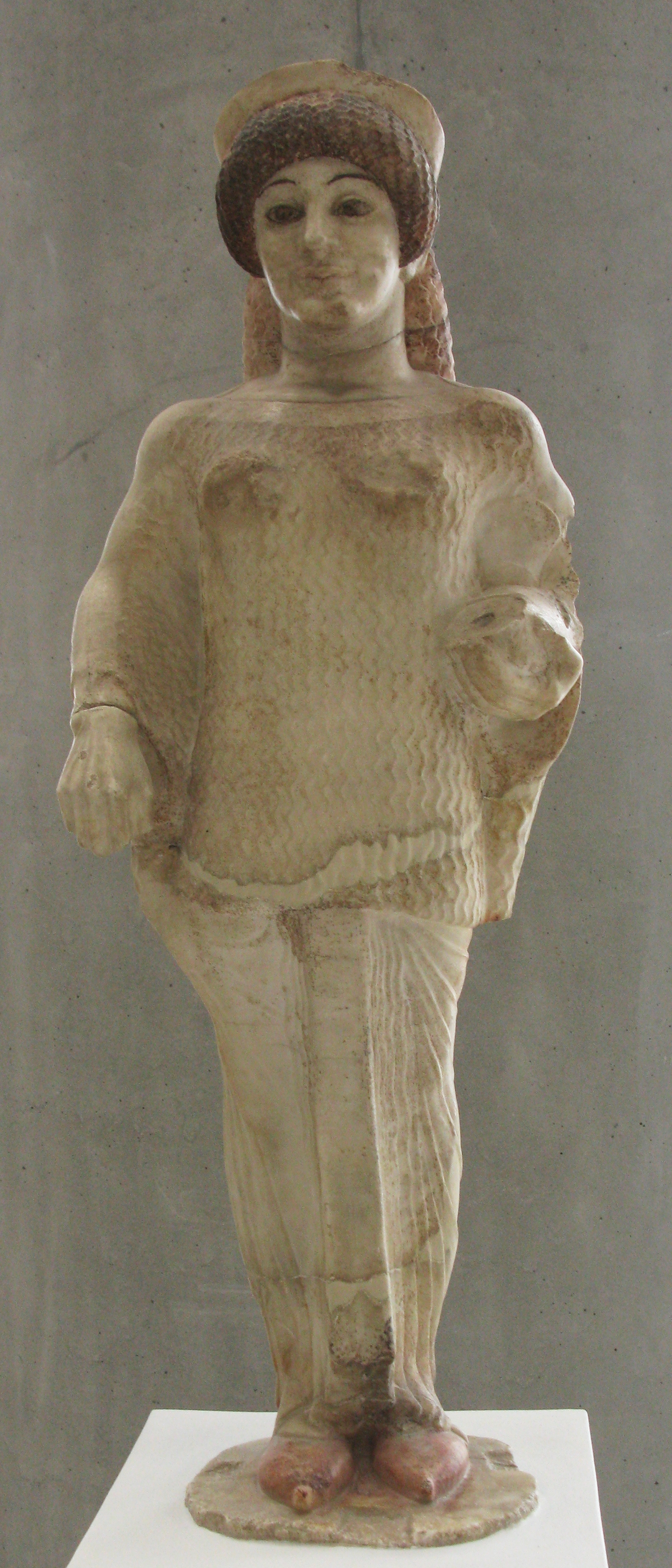
Lysias dedicated first-fruits to Athena. Euarchis dedicated a tithe to Athena.

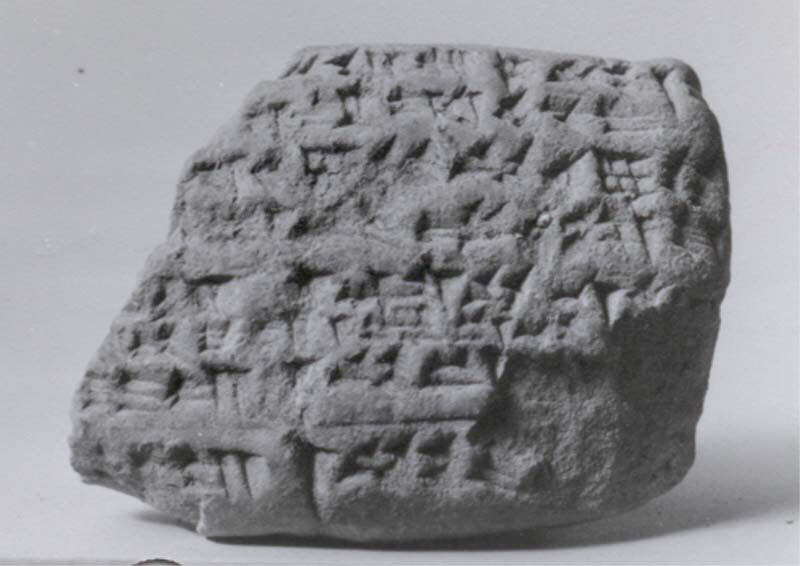
Cuneiform tablet: account of esru-tithe payments, Ebabbar archive.

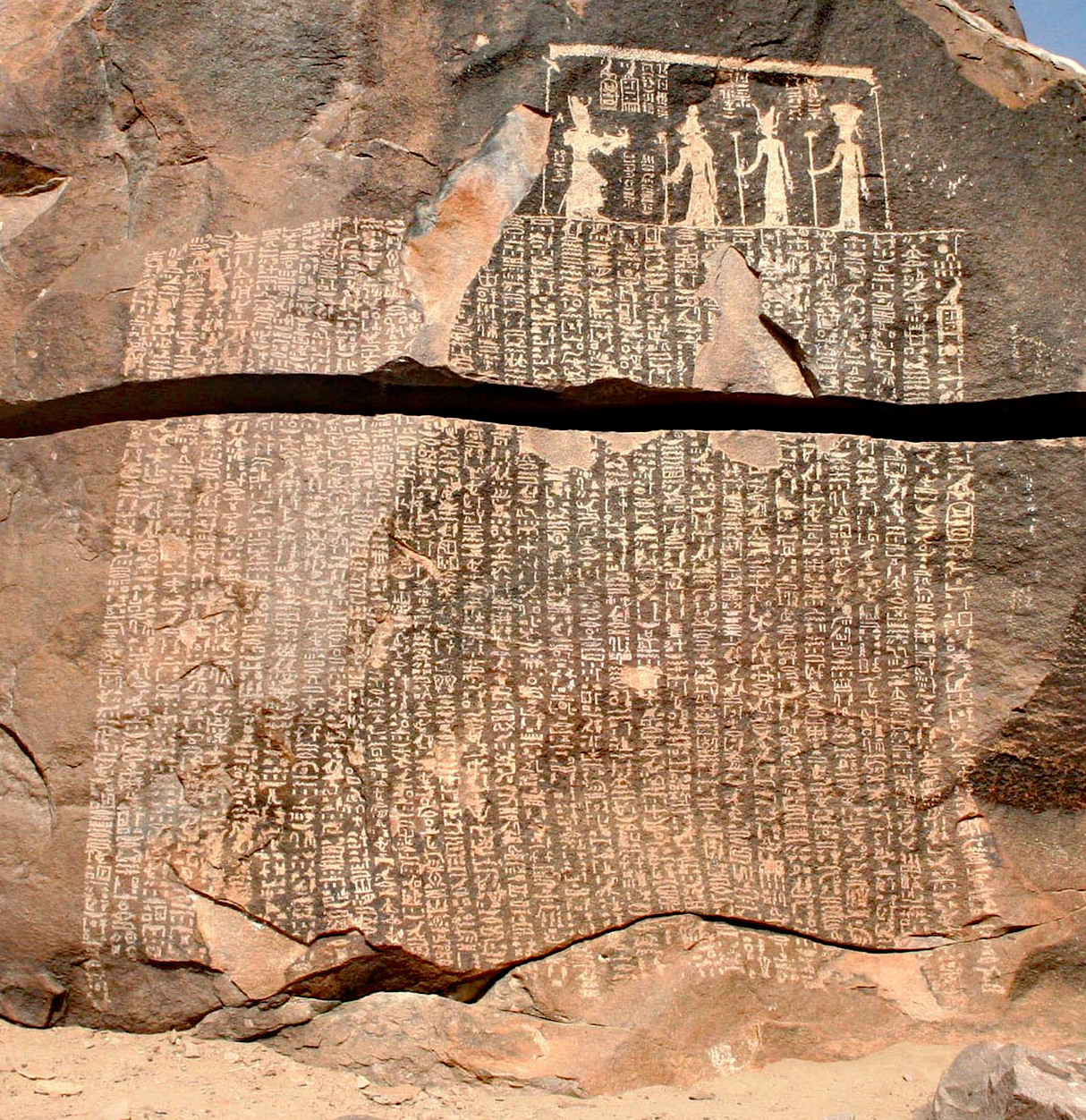
The Famine Stele.

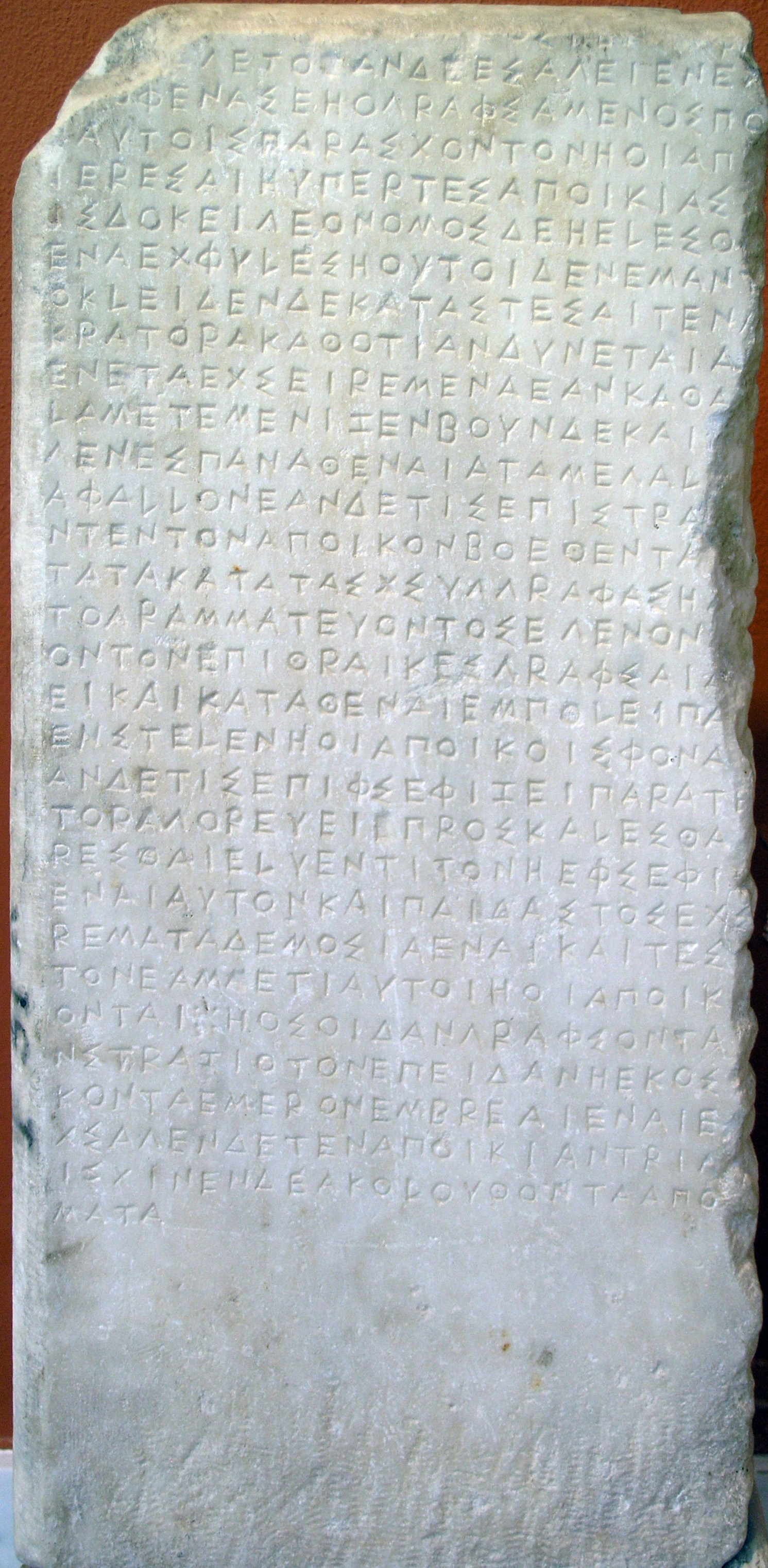
Brea fondation decree. "and his property shall be confiscated and a tithe given to the Goddess (Athena)."

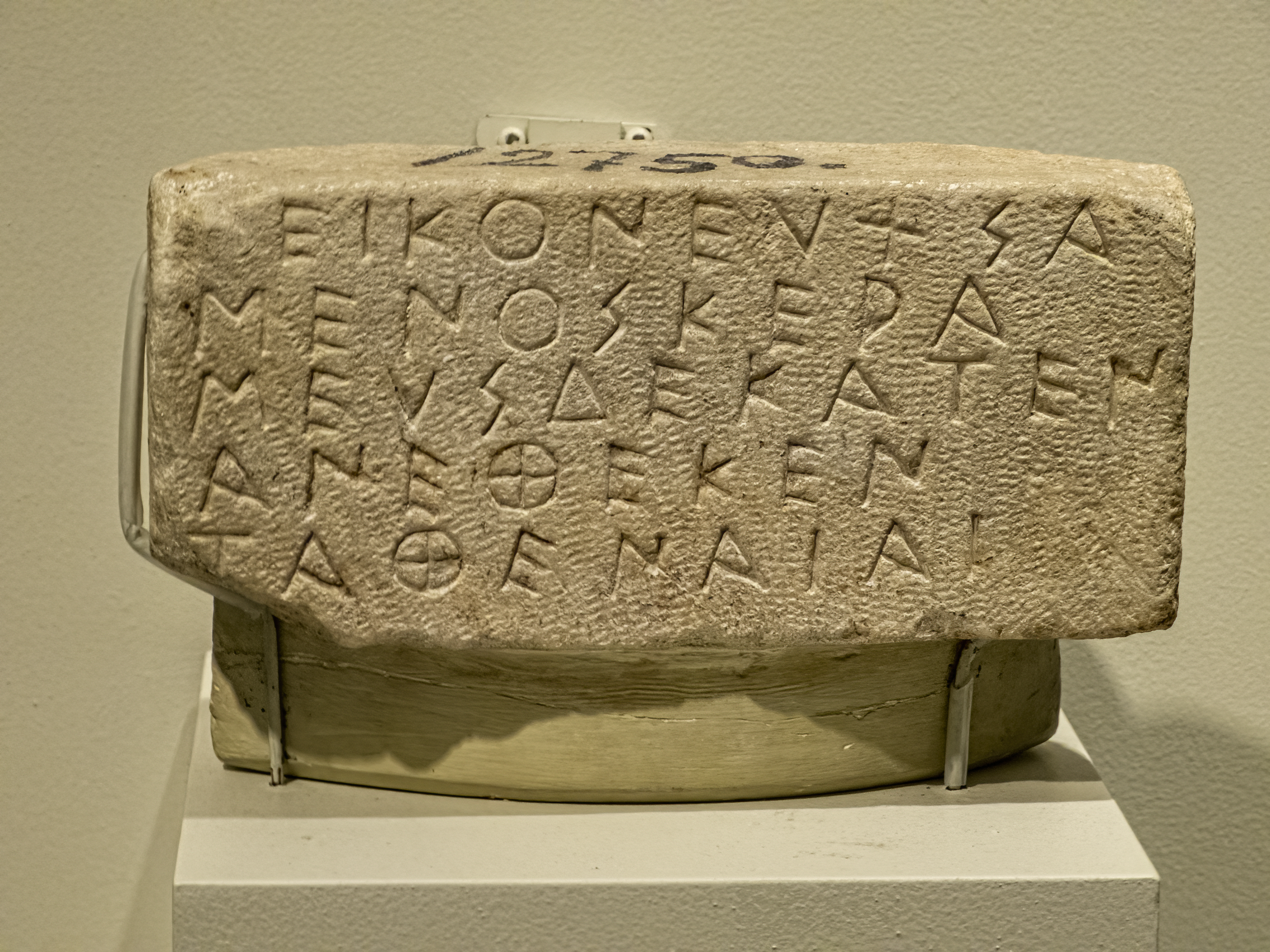
"Peikon the potter dedicated this as a tithe to Athena by a vow."

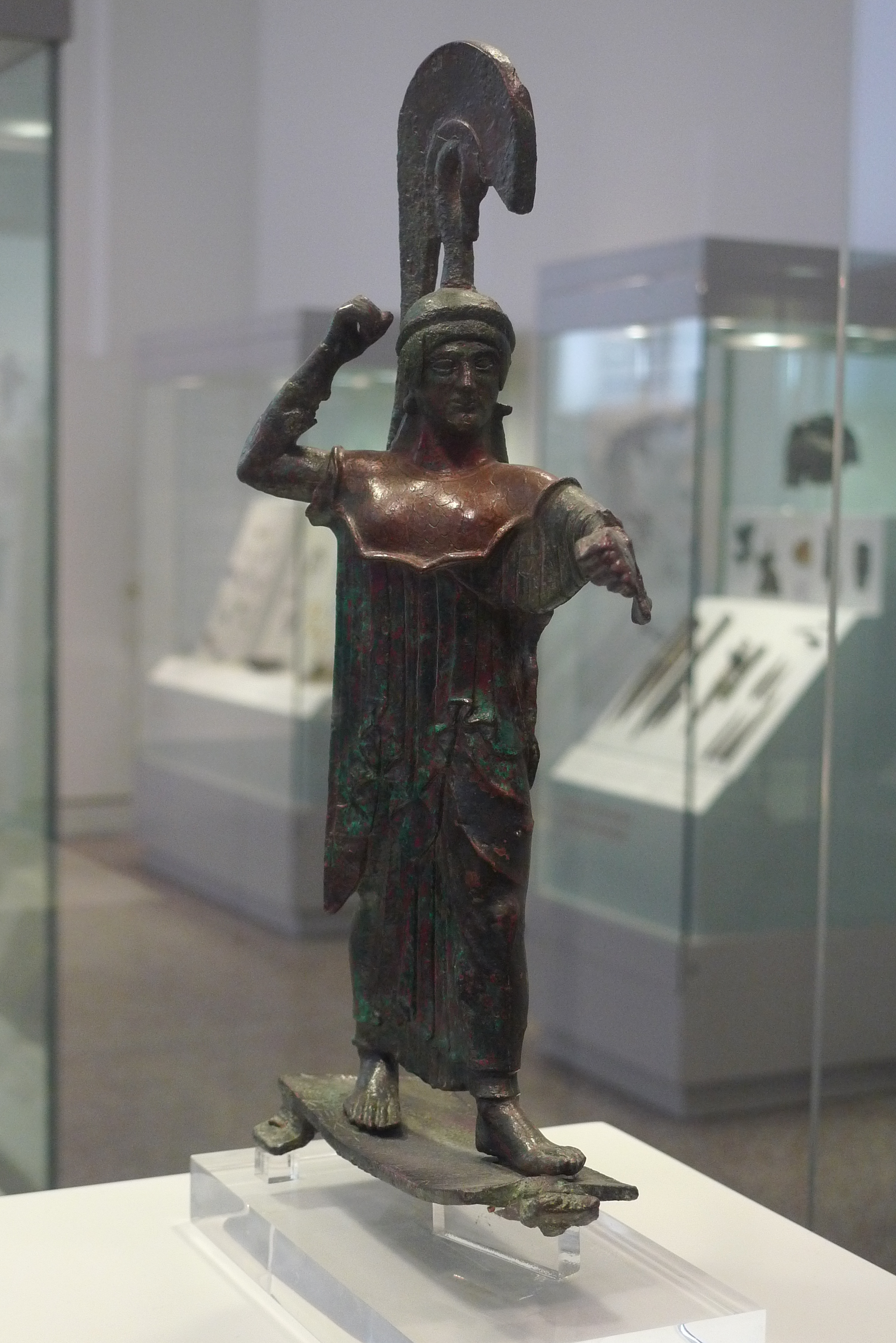
Statuette of Athena Promachos with dedication: "Meleso dedicated it to Athena as a tithe". 475-470 BC

=== The esretu – "ešretū" the Ugarit and Babylonian one-tenth tax ===
Some specific instances of the Mesopotamian tithe, taken from The Assyrian Dictionary of the Oriental Institute of the University of Chicago:

- [Referring to a ten percent tax levied on garments by the local ruler] "the palace has taken eight garments as your tithe (on 85 garments)"
- "...eleven garments as tithe (on 112 garments)"..
- "...(the sun-god) Shamash demands the tithe..."
- "four minas of silver, the tithe of [the gods] Bel, Nabu, and Nergal..."
- "...he has paid, in addition to the tithe for Ninurta, the tax of the gardiner"
- "...the tithe of the chief accountant, he has delivered it to [the sun-god] Shamash"
- "...why do you not pay the tithe to the Lady-of-Uruk?"
- "...(a man) owes barley and dates as balance of the tithe of the **years three and four"
- "...the tithe of the king on barley of the town..."
- "...with regard to the elders of the city whom (the king) has **summoned to (pay) tithe..."
- "...the collector of the tithe of the country Sumundar..."
- "...(the official Ebabbar in Sippar) who is in charge of the tithe..."
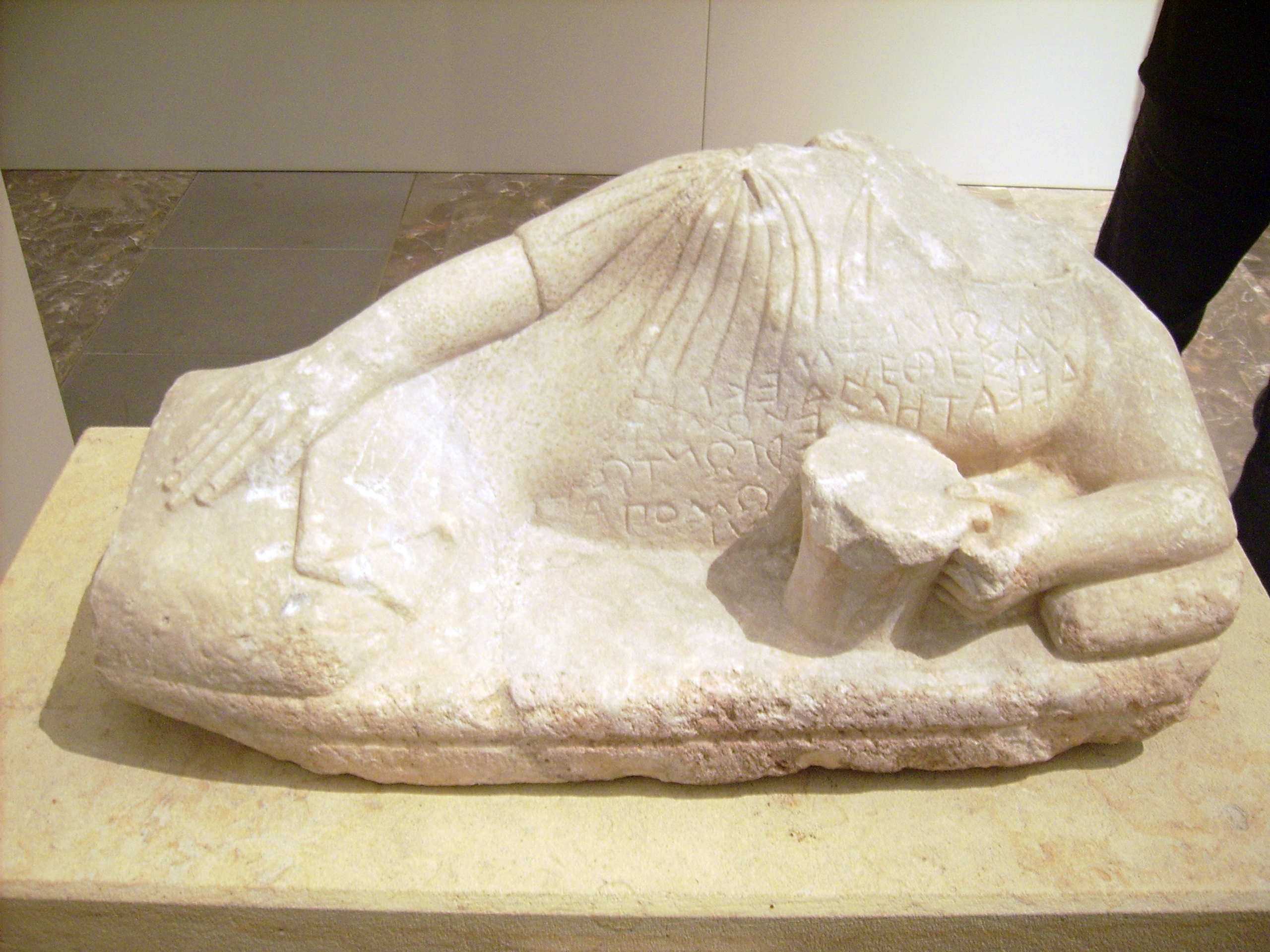
"Hermonax and his son dedicated me as a tithe of their works to Apollo."

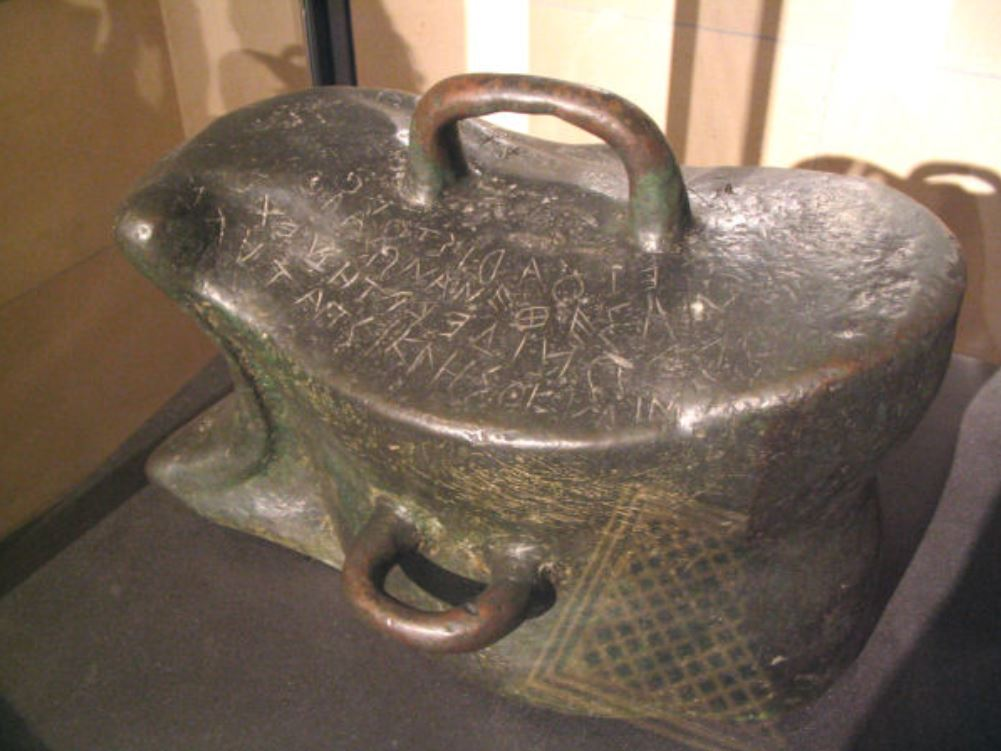
Weight from Didyma.

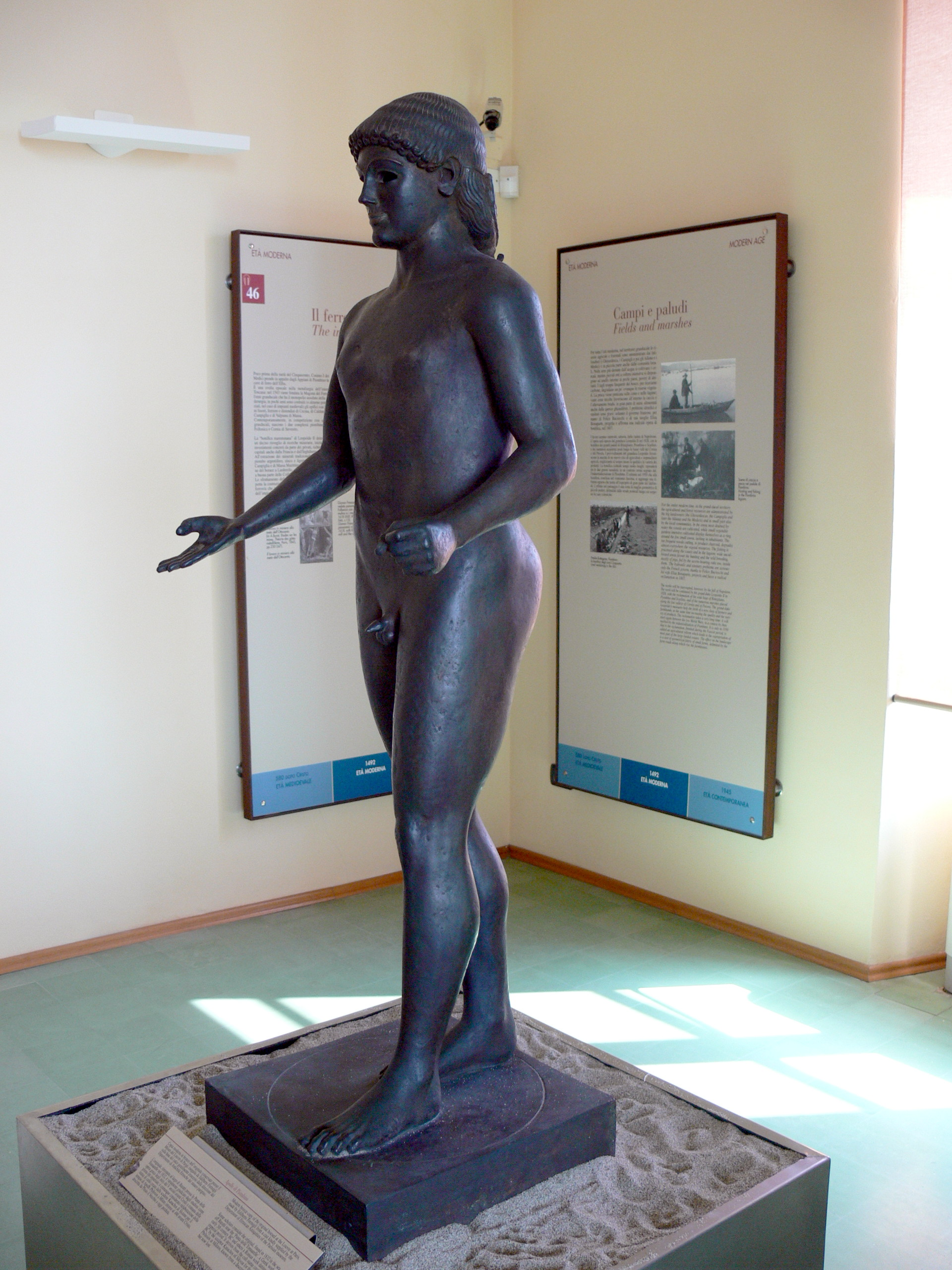
Apollo of Piombino.

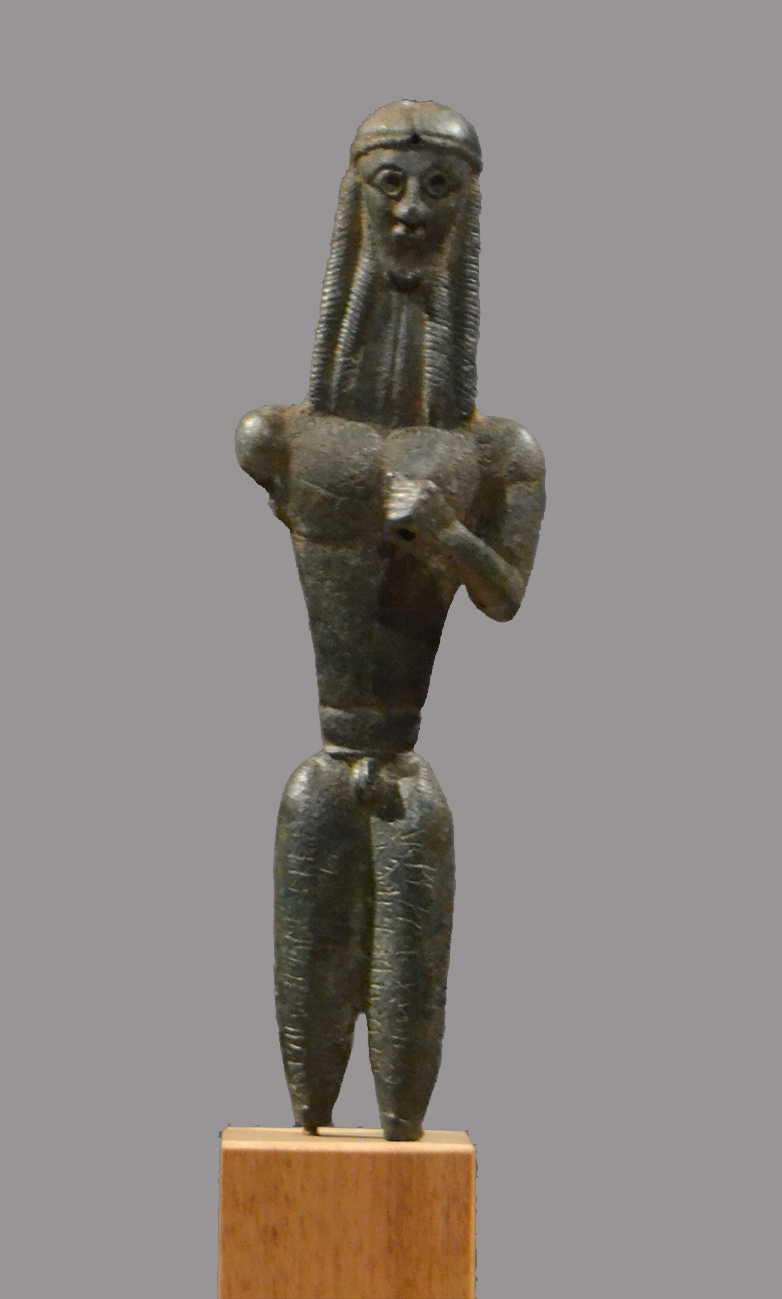
"Mantiklos donated me as a tithe to the far shooter, the bearer of the Silver Bow. You, Phoebus (Apollo) give something pleasing in return."

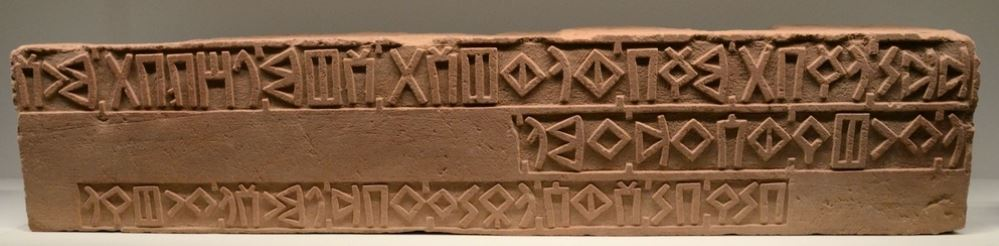
Dedanite inscription.

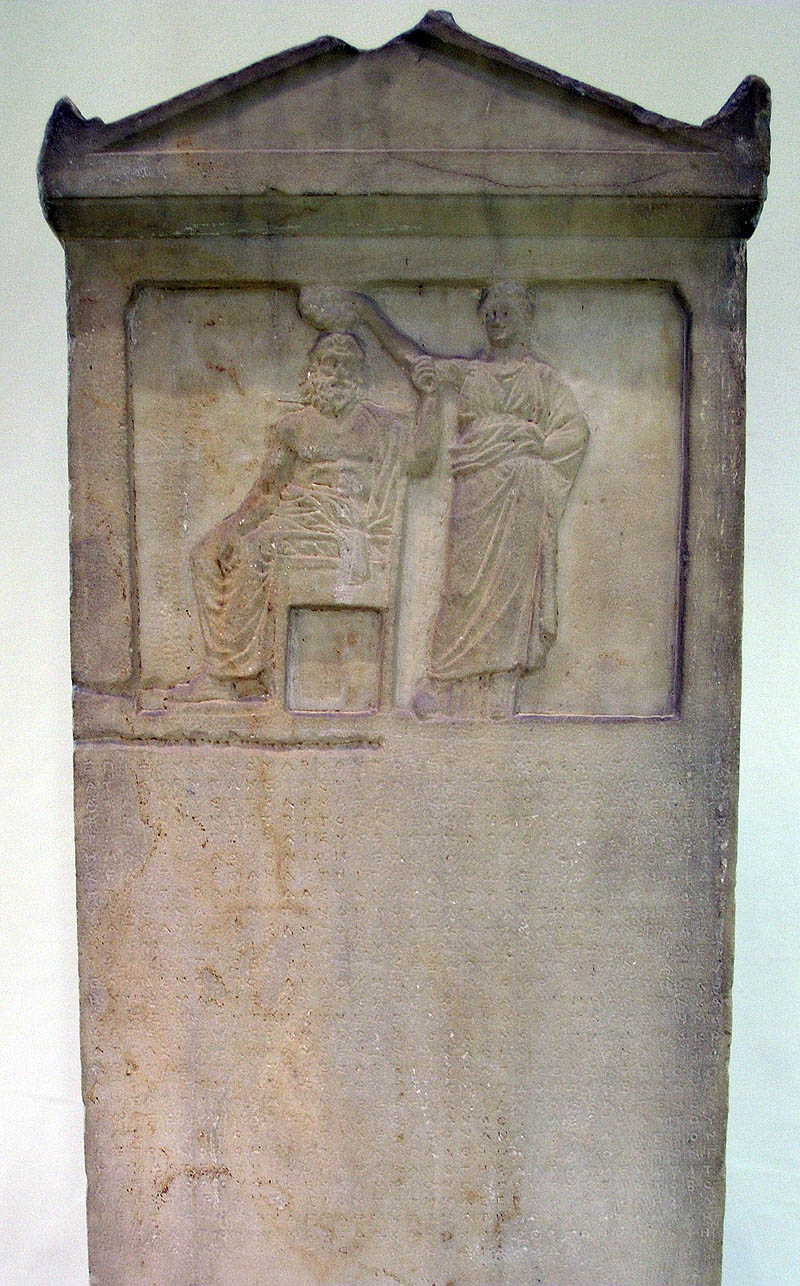
Law against tyranny. "Both he and his descendants, and his estate shall be public property, and a tithe for the goddess."

=== Tyre and Carthage ===
According to Diodorus Siculus, the Carthaginians, who were originally Tyrian colonists, customarily sent Melqart (Heracles in Interpretatio graeca) a tenth of all that was paid into the public revenue.

== Hebrew Bible ==
=== Laws ===
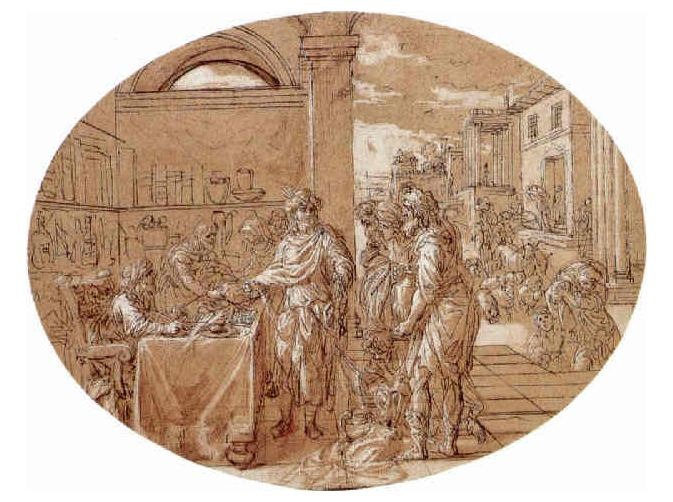
Tithing in the Temple by Pierre Monier

The Torah commands the giving of various agricultural tithes in various situations, specifically terumah, terumat hamaaser, the first tithe, second tithe, poor tithe, and animal tithe. Not all these "tithes" actually had the proportion of 1/10. These tithes are mentioned in the Books of Leviticus, Numbers and Deuteronomy.

Every year, terumah, first tithe and terumat ma'aser were separated from the grain, wine and oil. (As regards other fruit and produce, the Biblical requirement to tithe is a source of debate.) Terumah did not have a set amount, but the rabbis suggested it be 1/50 of the crop. First tithe was 1/10 of the crop. Terumah and terumat maaser were given to priests (kohanim); the first tithe was given to Levites. As priests and Levites did not own or inherit a territorial patrimony these tithes were their means of support. The Levites, in turn, separated terumat ma'aser from their tithe (1/10 of the tithe, or 1/100 of the crop).

The second tithe and poor tithe, both 1/10 of the crop, were taken in an alternating basis according to the seven-year shmita cycle. In years 1, 2, 4, and 5 of the cycle, second tithe was taken. In years 3 and 6, poor tithe was taken. (In year 7, private agriculture was prohibited, all crops that grew were deemed ownerless, and no tithes taken.) The second tithe was kept by the owner, but had to be eaten at the site of the Temple. (If this was difficult, the second could be redeemed for money which would be used to buy food at the Temple site.) The poor tithe was given to the strangers, orphans, and widows, and distributed locally "within thy gates" to support the Levites and assist the poor.

An additional tithe, mentioned in Leviticus 27:32–33 is the cattle tithe, which is to be sacrificed as a korban at the Temple in Jerusalem.

=== Stories ===
Tithing is mentioned twice in the stories of the Biblical patriarchs:

- In Genesis 14:20, Abraham, after rescuing Lot, met with Melchizedek. After Melchizedek's blessing, Abraham gave him a tenth of everything he had obtained from battle.
- In Genesis 28:16–22, Jacob, after his visionary dream of Jacob's Ladder and the promise that he will receive a blessing from God, promises to worship God ("then the LORD shall be my God") and to give God a tenth of his possessions.

Tithing is mentioned several times in the Book of Nehemiah, which chronicles events in the latter half of the 5th century BC. Nehemiah 10 outlines the customs regarding tithing. The Levites were to receive one tenth (the tithe) "in all our farming communities" and a tithe of the tithe were to be brought by them to the temple for storage. Nehemiah 13:4–19 recounts how Eliashib gave Tobiah office space in the temple in a room that had previously been used to store tithes while Nehemaiah was away. When Nehemiah returned he called it an evil thing, threw out all Tobiah's household items and had his rooms purified so that they could once more be used for tithes.

The Book of Malachi has one of the most frequently quoted Biblical passages about tithing. God (according to Malachi) promises that if the Jews begin to keep the laws of tithing, God will "open the windows of heaven for you and pour down for you a blessing until there is no more need".

== Deuterocanonical ==
The deuterocanonical Book of Tobit provides an example of all three classes of tithes practiced during the Babylonian captivity:

"I would often go by myself to Jerusalem on religious holidays, as the Law commanded for every Israelite for all time. I would hurry off to Jerusalem and take with me the early produce of my crops, a tenth of my flocks, and the first portion of the wool cut from my sheep. I would present these things at the altar to the priests, the descendants of Aaron. I would give the first tenth of my grain, wine, olive oil, pomegranates, figs, and other fruit to the Levites who served in Jerusalem. For six out of seven years, I also brought the cash equivalent of the second tenth of these crops to Jerusalem where I would spend it every year. I gave this to orphans and widows, and to Gentiles who had joined Israel. In the third year, when I brought and gave it to them, we would eat together according to the instruction recorded in Moses' Law, as Deborah my grandmother had taught me..."

— Tobit 1:6–8

== Judaism ==
Orthodox Jews continue to follow the biblical laws of tithes (see above) to a limited extent. In rabbinic interpretation, these agricultural laws apply only within the Land of Israel. For produce grown in modern Israel, tithes (terumot and maʿasrot) are therefore still separated. However, due to the absence of the Temple and the inability to observe the associated purity laws, as well as uncertainty regarding verified priestly and Levitical lineage, the separated portions are generally not consumed and are instead disposed of in accordance with halakhic guidelines. Outside the Land of Israel, these agricultural tithes are not practiced. In their place, a customary practice has developed of donating approximately one tenth of one’s income to charity (maʿaser kesafim). This practice is widely observed but is generally regarded as a customary or ethical obligation rather than a direct continuation of the biblical agricultural tithe.

The Mishnah and Talmud contain contain extensive discussions of the various types of tithes, including the first tithe, second tithe and the poor tithe and outline their application in different circumstances.

Animal tithes are not practiced in the modern era, as they were dependent on the sacrificial system of the Temple in Jerusalem, which is no longer standing.

== Christianity ==
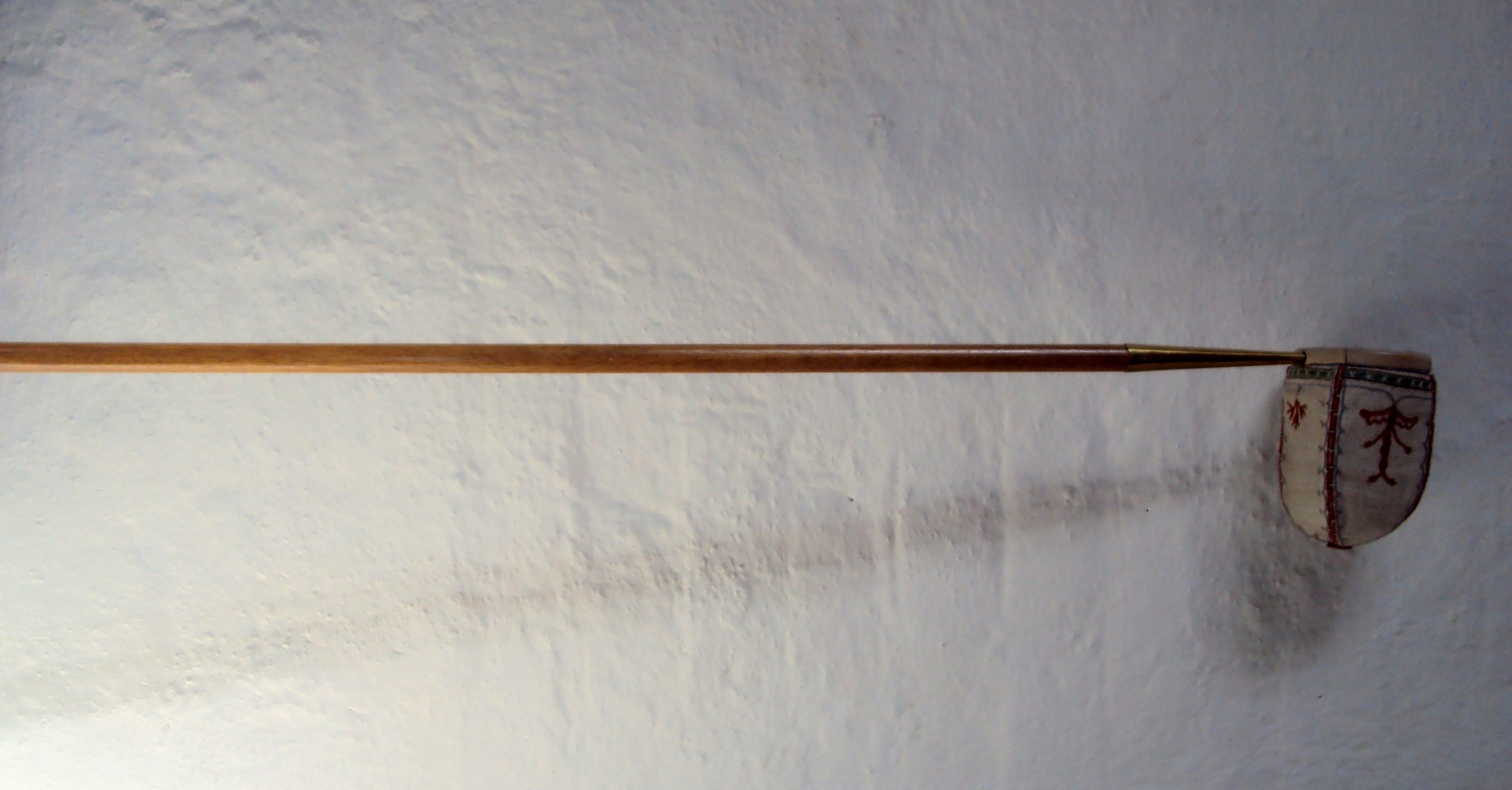
A collection bag used in the Lutheran Church of Sweden to collect a portion of ones' tithes during the offertory

In the New Testament, the Letter to the Hebrews recalls that Abraham had paid a tenth of the spoils he recovered to Melchizedek, king of Salem, priest of the Most High God (cf. Genesis 14:20).

Many churches practiced tithing, as it was taught by the Council of Tours in 567, and in the Third Council of Mâcon in AD 585, a penalty of excommunication was prescribed for those who did not adhere to this ecclesiastical law. Tithes can be given to the Church at once (as is the custom in many Christian countries with a church tax), or distributed throughout the year; during the part of Western Christian liturgies known as the offertory, people often place a portion of their tithes (sometimes along with additional offerings) in the collection plate.

2 Corinthians 9:7 talks about giving cheerfully, 2 Corinthians 8:12 encourages giving what one can afford, 1 Corinthians 16:1–2 discusses giving weekly (although this is a saved amount for Jerusalem), 1 Timothy 5:17–18 exhorts supporting the financial needs of Christian workers, Acts 11:29 promotes feeding the hungry wherever they may be and James 1:27 states that pure religion is to help widows and orphans.

According to a 2018 study by LifeWay Research that interviewed 1,010 Americans, 86% of people with Evangelical beliefs say that tithe is still a biblical commandment. Of those surveyed, 87% of Baptist believers, 86% of Pentecostal believers, 81% of Non-denominational believers share this position.

=== Denominational positions ===
==== Adventist churches ====
The Seventh-day Adventist Church teaches in its Fundamental Beliefs that "We acknowledge God's ownership by faithful service to Him and our fellow men, and by returning tithes and giving offerings for the proclamation of His gospel and the support of His Church."

==== Anabaptist churches ====
The Mennonite Church teaches that "tithing as a minimum baseline is one of the principles on which financial giving in this 'first fruits' system is based":

We depend on God's gracious gifts for food and clothing, for our salvation, and for life itself. We do not need to hold on tightly to money and possessions, but can share what God has given us. The practice of mutual aid is a part of sharing God's gifts so that no one in the family of faith will be without the necessities of life. Whether through community of goods or other forms of financial sharing, mutual aid continues the practice of Israel in giving special care to widows, orphans, aliens, and others in economic need (Deut. 24:17–22). Tithes and first-fruit offerings were also a part of this economic sharing (Deut. 26; compare Matt. 23:23).

==== Baptist churches ====
The Southern Baptist Convention resolved in 2013 to "exhort all Southern Baptists to tithe cheerfully and give sacrificially as good stewards of God's blessings to their local churches". However, Article XIII of the Baptist Faith and Message recognizes a Christian obligation to contribute but does not specifically mention tithing as a requirement. Other Southern Baptists do not observe a tithe, only an offering. Representing Southern Seminary, Professor Tom Schreiner states, "Is a tithe required? [...] I would say no, because a tithe is part of the Mosaic covenant."

The National Baptist Convention of America teaches that "Baptists believe that a proper sense of stewardship begins with the 'tithe'; a presentation of which belongs to Him. 'The tithe is the Lord's.' We have not given as a result of presenting the tithe. Our giving begins with the offering [after we have tithed]."

The Treatise of the National Association of Free Will Baptists, Chapter XVI, specifically states that both the Old and New Testaments "teach tithing as God's financial plan for the support of His work".

==== Catholic Church ====
The Council of Trent, which was held after the Reformation, taught that "tithes are due to God or to religion, and that it is sacrilegious to withhold them", but the Catholic Church no longer requires anyone to give ten percent of income. The Church simply asks Catholics to support the mission of their parish. According to the Catechism of the Catholic Church "The faithful also have the duty of providing for the material needs of the Church, each according to his own abilities".

==== Lutheran churches ====
The Lutheran Church–Missouri Synod teaches that "Encourage[s] cheerful, first-fruit, proportionate (including but not limited to tithing) living and giving in all areas of life by Christian stewards".

==== Methodist churches ====
The Discipline of The Allegheny Wesleyan Methodist Connection, which teaches the doctrine of the Storehouse Tithing, holds:

That all our people pay to God at least one-tenth of all their increase as a minimum financial obligation, and freewill offerings in addition as God has prospered them. The tenth is figured upon the tither's gross income in salary or net increase when operating a business.

The Book of Discipline of the United Methodist Church states that it is the responsibility of ecclesiastics to "educate the local church that tithing is the minimum goal of giving in The United Methodist Church."

The Church of the Nazarene teaches Storehouse Tithing, in which members are asked to donate one-tenth of their income to their local church—this is to be prioritized before giving an offering to apostolates or charities.

==== Moravian Church ====
The Moravian Church encourages its members to "financially support the ministry of the Church toward the goal of tithing". It deems it "a sacred responsibility and genuine opportunity to be faithful stewards of all God has entrusted to us: our time, our talents, [and] our financial resources".

==== Orthodox churches ====
Tithing in medieval Eastern Christianity did not spread so widely as in the West. A Constitution of the Emperors Leo I (reigned 457–474) and Anthemius (reigned 467–472) apparently expected believers to make voluntary payments and forbade compulsion.

The Greek Orthodox Archdiocese of America teaches "proportionate giving and tithing as normal practices of Christian giving".

==== Pentecostal churches ====
The Pentecostal Church of God teaches that "We recognize the scriptural duty of all our people, as well as ministers, to pay tithes as unto the Lord. Tithes should be used for the support of active ministry and for the propagation of the Gospel and the work of the Lord in general."

The International Pentecostal Holiness Church likewise instructs the faithful that:

Our commitment to Jesus Christ includes stewardship. According to the Bible everything belongs to God. We are stewards of His resources. Our stewardship of possessions begins with the tithe. All our members are expected to return a tenth of all their income to the Lord.

==== Reformed churches ====
The Book of Order of the Presbyterian Church (USA) states, with respect to the obligation to tithe:

Giving has always been a mark of Christian commitment and discipleship. The ways in which a believer uses God's gifts of material goods, personal abilities, and time should reflect a faithful response to God's self-giving in Jesus Christ and Christ's call to minister to and share with others in the world. Tithing is a primary expression of the Christian discipline of stewardship.

The United Church of Christ, a denomination in the Congregationalist tradition, teaches that:

When we tithe we place God as our first priority. We trust in God's abundance instead of worrying about not having enough. Tithing churches live out a vision of abundance rather than a mentality of scarcity.

==== The Church of Jesus Christ of Latter-day Saints ====
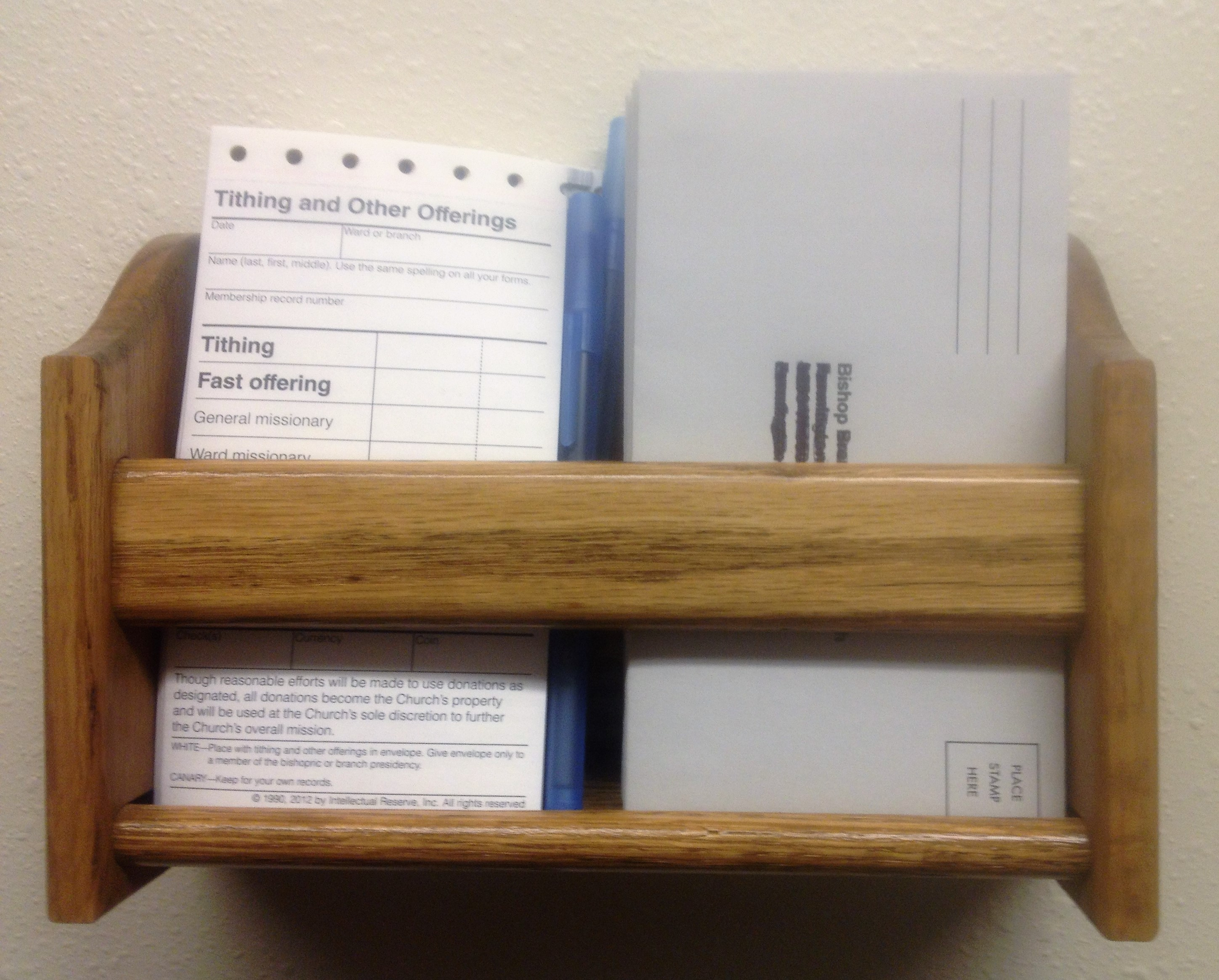
Tithing forms and envelopes in an LDS meetinghouse.

The Church of Jesus Christ of Latter-day Saints (LDS Church) bases its tithing on the additional scriptures:

And this shall be the beginning of the tithing of my people. And after that, those who have thus been tithed shall pay one-tenth of all their interest annually; and this shall be a standing law unto them forever, for my holy priesthood, saith the Lord.

— Doctrine and Covenants 119:3–4 (see also Doctrine and Covenants 64:23–24)

And it was this same Melchizedek to whom Abraham paid tithes; yea, even our father Abraham paid tithes of one-tenth part of all he possessed.

— Alma 13:15

Tithing is defined by the church as payment of one-tenth of one's annual income. Many church leaders have made statements in support of tithing. Every Latter-day Saint has an opportunity once a year to meet with their bishop for tithing declaration. The payment of tithes is mandatory for members to receive the priesthood or obtain a temple recommend for admission to temples.

The Church of Jesus Christ of Latter-day Saints is a lay ministry. The money that is given is used to construct and maintain its buildings as well as to further the work of the church. None of the funds collected from tithing is paid to local church officials or those who serve in the church. Those serving in full-time church leadership do receive stipends for living expenses, but they are paid from non-tithing resources, such as investments. Brigham Young University, a church-sponsored institution, also receives "a significant portion" of its maintenance and operating costs from tithes of the church's members.

=== Church collection of religious offerings and taxes ===
==== England and Wales ====
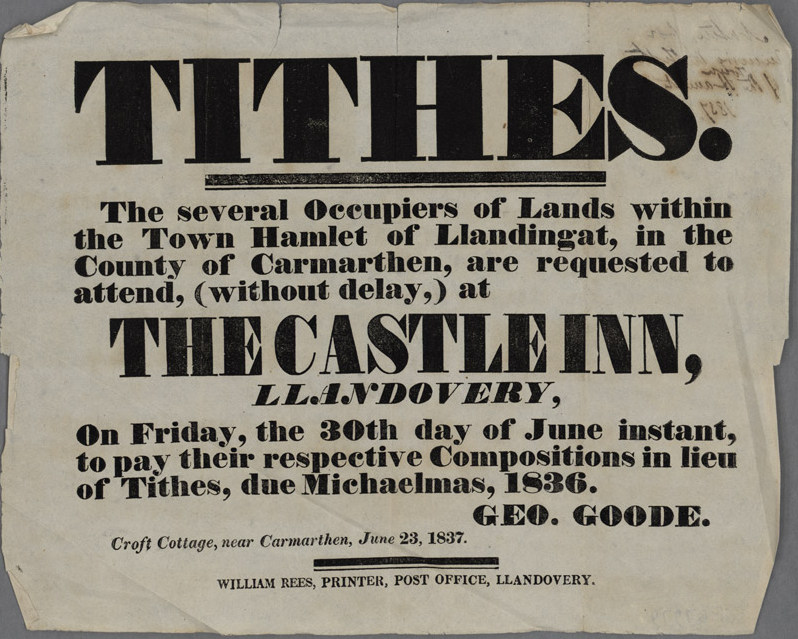
Public notice in Wales demanding tithe payments, 1837

The right to receive tithes was granted to the English churches by King Ethelwulf in 855. The Saladin tithe was a royal tax, but assessed using ecclesiastical boundaries, in 1188. The legal validity of the tithe system was affirmed under the Statute of Westminster of 1285. The Dissolution of the Monasteries led to the transfer of many rights to tithe to secular landowners and the Crown – and tithes could be extinguished until 1577 under an Act of the 37th year of Henry VIII's reign (Tithes in London Act 1545).

Adam Smith criticized the system in The Wealth of Nations (1776), arguing that a fixed rent would encourage peasants to work far more efficiently.

===== Dissenters =====
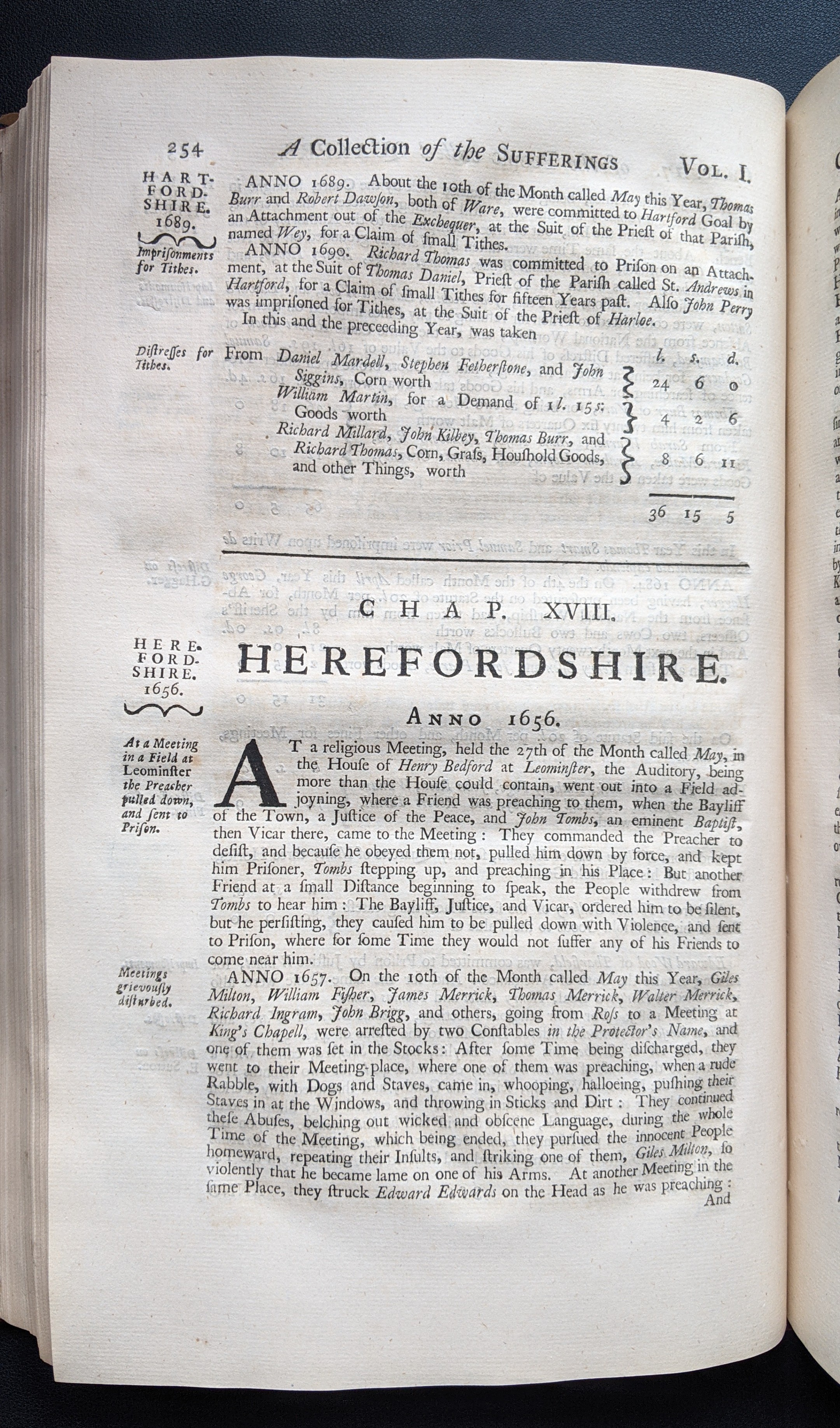
The first page of chapter 28 of Besse's 'Collection of Sufferings', covering Herefordshire

In the seventeenth century various dissenting groups objected to paying tithes to Church of England. Quakers were prominent among these, objecting to 'forced payments for the maintenance of a professional ministry'. In 1659 guidance was issued for a national system for recording the fines, impropriations and imprisonments for non-payment of tithes as seen in the following extract from a document.

Clause 9. Sufferings of Friends to be gathered up and recorded, the sufferes to report to a recorder in each meeting who is to report to the next General Meeting for the county for record by a county recorder.

— From Register Book of a Monthly Meeting in Hampshire, 1659

These records were eventually collated and published in 1753 by Joseph Besse, documenting widespread persecution throughout the British Isles and further abroad. This only abated in the 1680s, due in no small measure to the efforts of William Penn who, through his father's earlier connections at court, was friendly with Charles I and James, Duke of York and interceded with them in behalf of Quakers in England and on the Continent, respectively.

See below for a fuller description and history, until the reforms of the 19th century, written by Sir William Blackstone and edited by other learned lawyers of the period.

===== End of the tithing system =====
The system gradually ended with the Tithe Commutation Act 1836, whose long-lasting Tithe Commission replaced them with a commutation payment, land award and/or rentcharges to those paying the commutation payment and took the opportunity to map out (apportion) residual chancel repair liability where the rectory had been appropriated during the medieval period by a religious house or college. Its records giving a snapshot of land ownership in most parishes, the Tithe Files, are a socio-economic history resource. The rolled-up payment of several years' tithe would be divided between the tithe-owners as at the date of their extinction.

This commutation reduced problems to the ultimate payers by effectively folding tithes in with rents however, it could cause transitional money supply problems by raising the transaction demand for money. Later the decline of large landowners led tenants to become freeholders and again have to pay directly; this also led to renewed objections of principle by non-Anglicans. It also kept intact a system of chancel repair liability affecting the minority of parishes where the rectory had been lay-appropriated. The precise land affected in such places hinged on the content of documents such as the content of deeds of merger and apportionment maps.

===== Tithe redemption =====
Tithe Act 1951 (Note: Section 12(1).)
- Act of Parliament
- Parliament of the United Kingdom
- Long title: An Act to provide, in lieu of the obligation imposed by the Tithe Act, 1936, to register all annuities charged thereby, for registration in selected districts, to amend and to repeal certain provisions of that Act, and to make further provision with respect to certain matters connected therewith.
- Citation: 14 & 15 Geo. 6. c. 62
- Territorial extent: United Kingdom

Dates
- Royal assent: 1 August 1951
- Commencement: 1 September 1951 (Note: Section 12(4).)
Other legislation
Amends	Tithe Act 1836; Tithe Act 1847; Tithe Annuities Apportionment Act 1921; Tithe Act 1936
Amended by	Finance Act 1963; Corn Rents Act 1963; Finance Act 1977; Tithe Records (Transfer of Custody) Order 1981; Statute Law (Repeals) Act 2004

Status: Amended

Text of statute as originally enacted

Revised text of statute as amended

Text of the Tithe Act 1951 as in force today (including any amendments) within the United Kingdom, from legislation.gov.uk.

Rent charges in lieu of abolished English tithes paid by landowners were converted by a public outlay of money under the Tithe Act 1936 (26 Geo. 5 & 1 Edw. 8. c. 43) into annuities paid to the state through the Tithe Redemption Commission. Such payments were transferred in 1960 to the Board of Inland Revenue, and those remaining were terminated by the Finance Act 1977.

The Tithe Act 1951 (14 & 15 Geo. 6. c. 62) established the compulsory redemption of English tithes by landowners where the annual amounts payable were less than £1, so abolishing the bureaucracy and costs of collecting small sums of money.

Part of an 1842 tithe map including the small village of East Dundry near Bristol, England, with names of its fields and two farms. Note the tithe-officer signature and stamp near the top.

Tithe map for the property

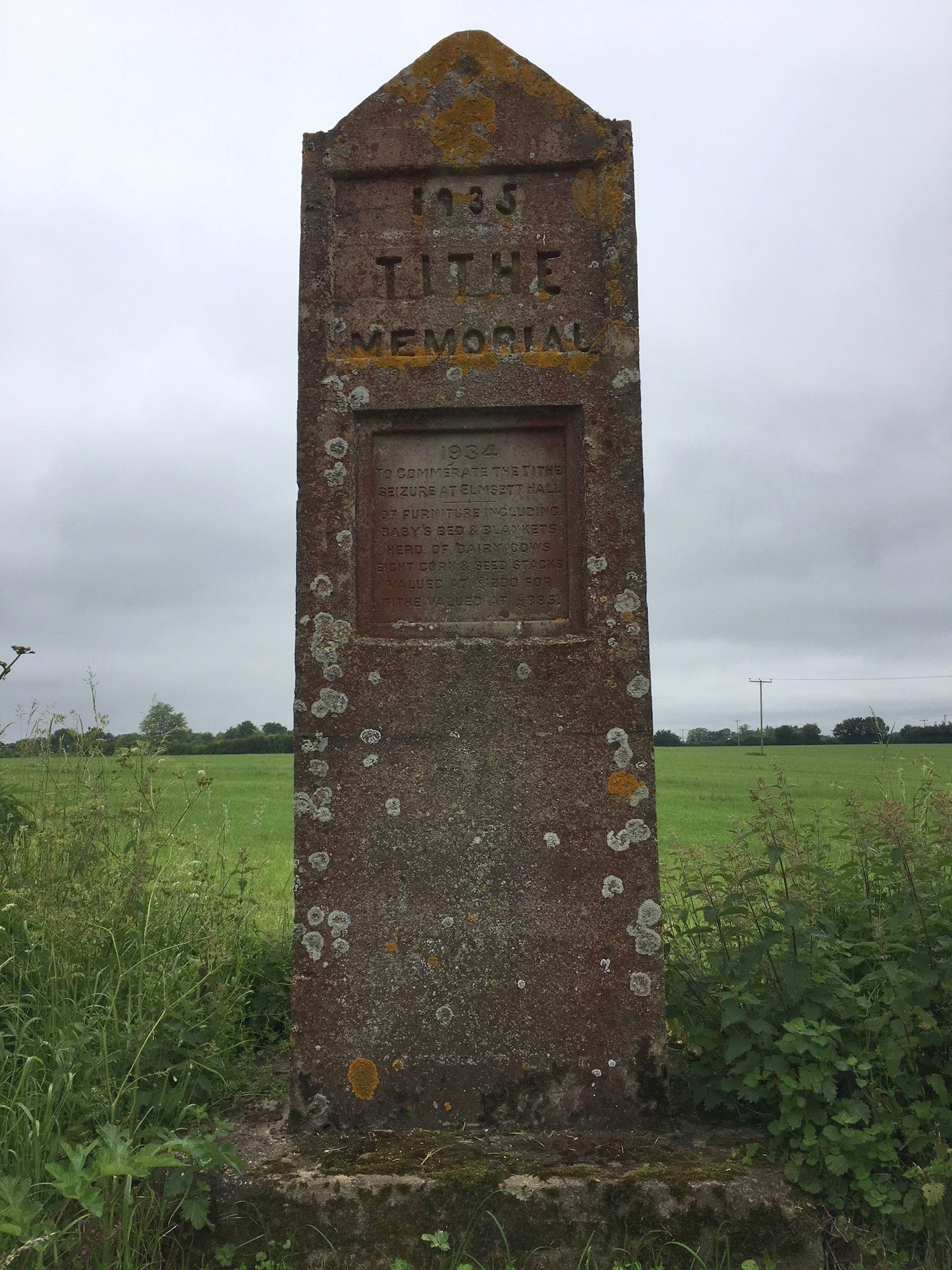
Elmsett tithe memorial in Suffolk, England, opposite the parish church, protesting against a tithe seizure

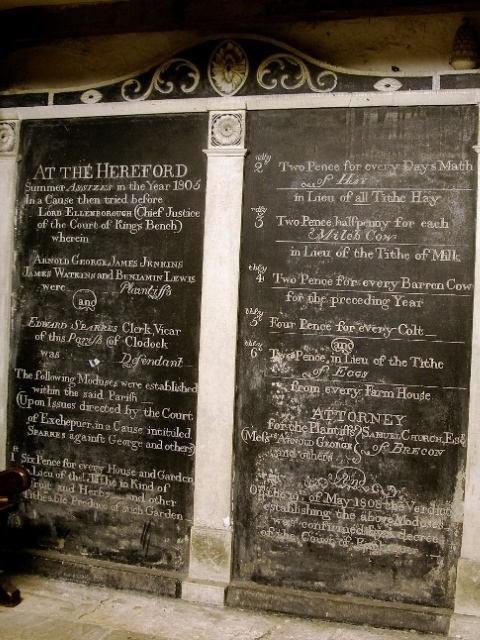
Carved record of the judgement in a tithe dispute, in Clodock Church, Wales

==== Greece ====
There has never been a separate church tax or mandatory tithe on Greek citizens. The state pays the salaries of the clergy of the established Church of Greece, in return for use of real estate, mainly forestry, owned by the church. The remainder of church income comes from voluntary, tax-deductible donations from the faithful. These are handled by each diocese independently.

==== Ireland ====
From the English Reformation in the 16th century, most Irish people chose to remain Roman Catholic and had by now to pay tithes valued at about 10 per cent of an area's agricultural produce, to maintain and fund the established state church, the Anglican Church of Ireland, to which only a small minority of the population converted. Irish Presbyterians and other minorities like the Quakers and Jews were in the same situation.

The collection of tithes was resisted in the period 1831–36, known as the Tithe War. Thereafter, tithes were reduced and added to rents with the passing of the Tithe Commutation Act 1838. With the disestablishment of the Church of Ireland by the Irish Church Act 1869, tithes were abolished.

==== United States ====
While the federal government has never collected a church tax or mandatory tithe on its citizens, states collected a tithe into the early 19th century. The United States and its governmental subdivisions also exempt most churches from payment of income tax (under Section 501(c)(3) of the Internal Revenue Code and similar state statutes, which also allows donors to claim the donations as an income tax itemized deduction). Also, churches may be permitted exemption from other state and local taxes such as sales and property taxes, either in whole or in part. Clergy, such as ministers and members of religious orders (who have taken a vow of poverty) may be exempt from federal self-employment tax on income from ministerial services. Income from non-ministerial services are taxable and churches are required to withhold Federal and state income tax from this non-exempt income. They are also required to withhold employee's share of Social Security and Medicare taxes under FICA, and pay the employer's share for the non-exempt income.

==== Spain and Latin America ====
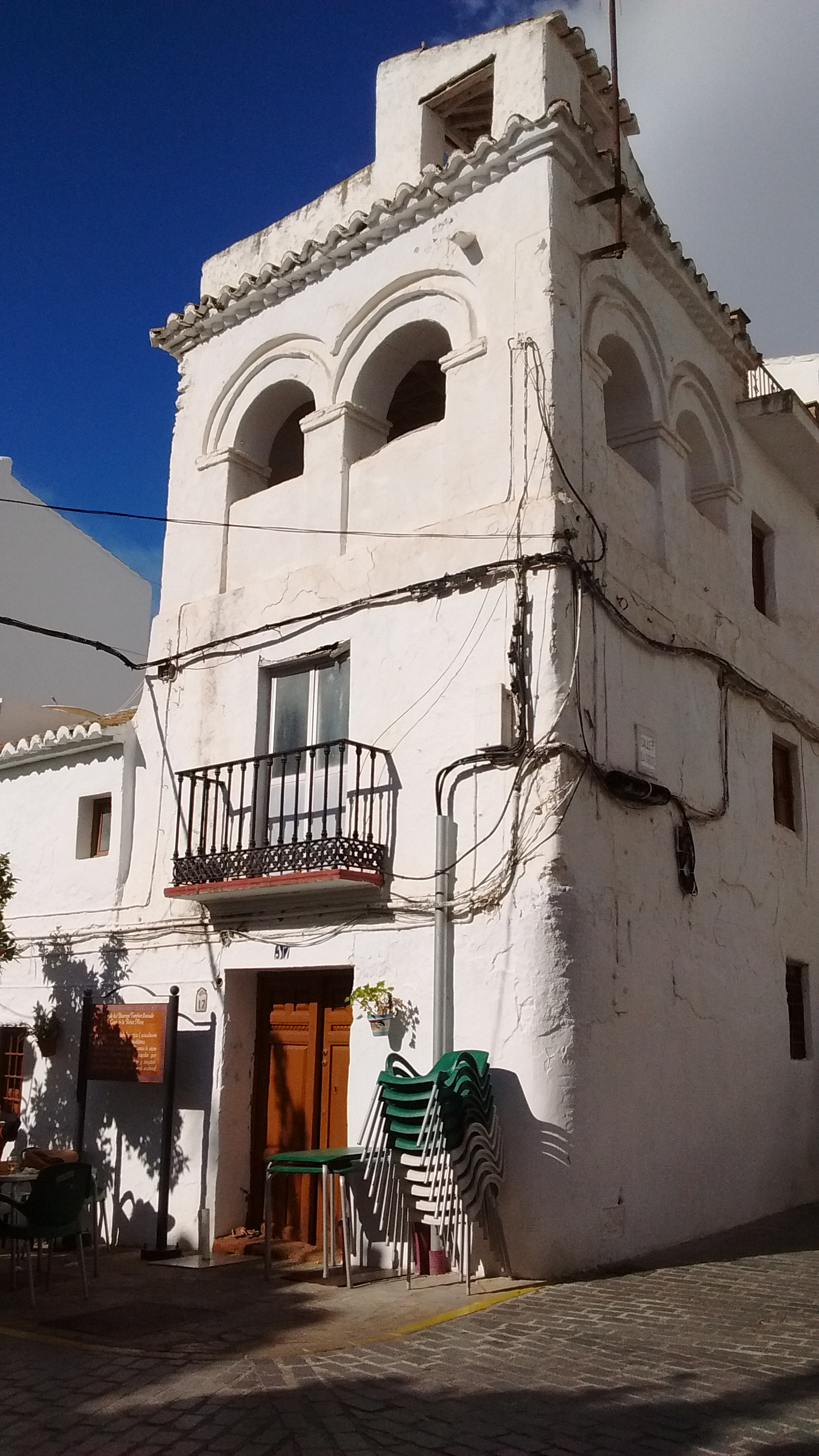
Casa de los Diezmos, Canillas de Aceituno, Málaga, Spain

Both the tithe (diezmo), a levy of 10 per cent on all agricultural production, and "first fruits" (primicias), an additional harvest levy, were collected in Spain throughout the medieval and early modern periods for the support of local Catholic parishes.

The tithe crossed the Atlantic with the Spanish Empire; however, the Indians who made up the vast majority of the population in colonial Spanish America were exempted from paying tithes on native crops such as corn and potatoes that they raised for their own subsistence. After some debate, Indians in colonial Spanish America were forced to pay tithes on their production of European agricultural products, including wheat, silk, cows, pigs, and sheep.

The tithe was abolished in several Latin American countries, including Mexico, soon after independence from Spain (which started in 1810). The tithe was abolished in Argentina in 1826, and in Spain itself in 1841.

=== Governmental collection of Christian religious offerings and taxes ===
==== Austria ====
In Austria a colloquially called church tax (Kirchensteuer, officially called Kirchenbeitrag, i. e. church contribution) has to be paid by members of the Catholic and Protestant Church. It is levied by the churches themselves and not by the government. The obligation to pay church tax can just be evaded by an official declaration to cease church membership. The tax is calculated on the basis of personal income. It amounts to about 1.1 per cent (Catholic church) and 1.5 per cent (Protestant church).

==== Denmark ====
All members of the Church of Denmark pay a church tax, which varies between municipalities. The tax is generally around 1% of the taxable income.

==== Finland ====
Members of state churches pay a church tax of between 1% and 2% of income, depending on the municipality. In addition, 2.55 per cent of corporate taxes are distributed to the state churches. Church taxes are integrated into the common national taxation system.

==== Germany ====
Germany levies a church tax, on all persons declaring themselves to be Christians, of roughly 8–9% of their income tax, which is effectively (very much depending on the social and financial situation) typically between 0.2% and 1.5% of the total income. The proceeds are shared among Catholic, Lutheran, and other Protestant Churches.

The church tax (Kirchensteuer) traces its roots back as far as the Reichsdeputationshauptschluss of 1803. It was reaffirmed in the Concordat of 1933 between Nazi Germany and the Catholic Church. Its legal basis is article 140 of the Grundgesetz (the German constitution) in connection with article 137 of the Weimar Constitution. These laws originally merely allowed the churches themselves to tax their members, but in Nazi Germany, collection of church taxes was transferred to the German government. As a result, both the German government and the employer are notified of the religious affiliation of every taxpayer. This system is still in effect. Mandatory disclosure of religious affiliation to government agencies or employers constituted a violation of the original European data protection directives but is now permitted after the German government obtained an exemption.

Church tax (Kirchensteuer) is compulsory in Germany for those confessing members of a particular religious group. It is deducted at the PAYE level. The duty to pay this tax theoretically starts on the day one is christened. Anyone who wants to stop paying it has to declare in writing, at their local court of law (Amtsgericht) or registry office, that they are leaving the Church. They are then crossed off the Church registers and can no longer receive the sacraments, confession and certain services; a Roman Catholic church may deny such a person a burial plot. In addition to the government, the taxpayer also must notify his employer of his religious affiliation (or lack thereof) in order to ensure proper tax withholding.

This opt-out is also used by members of "free churches" (e.g. Baptists) (non-affiliated to the scheme) to stop paying the church tax, from which the free churches do not benefit, in order to support their own church directly.

==== Italy ====
Originally the Italian government of Benito Mussolini, under the Lateran treaties of 1929 with the Holy See, paid a monthly salary to Catholic clergymen. This salary was called the congrua. The eight-per-thousand law was created as a result of an agreement, in 1984, between the Italian Republic and the Holy See.

Under this law Italian taxpayers are able to vote how to partition the 0.8% ('eight per thousand') of the total income tax IRPEF levied by Italy among some specific religious confessions or, alternatively, to a social assistance program run by the Italian State. This declaration is made on the IRPEF form. This vote is not compulsory; the whole amount levied by the IRPEF tax is distributed in proportion to explicit declarations.

The last official statement of Italian Ministry of Finance made in respect of the year 2000 singles out seven beneficiaries: the Italian State, the Catholic Church, the Waldenses, the Jewish Communities, the Lutherans, the Seventh-day Adventist Church and the Assemblies of God in Italy.

The tax was divided up as follows:

- 87.17% Catholic Church
- 10.35% Italian state
- 1.21% Waldenses
- 0.46% Jewish communities
- 0.32% Lutherans
- 0.28% Adventists of the Seventh Day
- 0.21% Assemblies of God in Italy

In 2000, the Catholic Church raised almost a billion euros, while the Italian state received about €100 million.

==== Scotland ====
In Scotland teinds were the tenths of certain produce of the land appropriated to the maintenance of the Church and clergy. At the Reformation most of the Church property was acquired by the Crown, nobles and landowners. In 1567 the Privy Council of Scotland provided that a third of the revenues of lands should be applied to paying the clergy of the reformed Church of Scotland. In 1925 the system was recast by statute and provision was made for the standardisation of stipends at a fixed value in money. The Court of Session acted as the Teind Court. Teinds were finally abolished by section 56 of the Abolition of Feudal Tenure etc. (Scotland) Act 2000.

==== Switzerland ====
In the territory of present-day Switzerland the ecclesiastical tithe (German Zehnt, French dîme) was, from the early Middle Ages, a levy of one tenth of agricultural produce paid to the parish church, and by the early modern period it had become the heaviest levy in kind for peasants of the Swiss Plateau and, where secularized at the Reformation, a major source of cantonal revenue. Counted among the "feudal dues" from the Enlightenment on, it was abolished during the 19th century at different times in the different cantons.

The modern successor to the tithe is the church tax (Kirchensteuer). There is no national state church in Switzerland; under Article 72 of the Federal Constitution, the regulation of church–state relations is a matter for the cantons. Most cantons levy a church tax, collected through the tax system, on the registered members of the denominations they recognise under public law—typically the Roman Catholic Church, the Evangelical Reformed Church, and, in some cantons, the Christian Catholic (Old Catholic) Church and Jewish communities. Such recognition has generally not been extended to other faiths such as Islam or Buddhism. The tax falls only on church members: whether a member may decline it or must instead formally leave the church varies by canton, and it is voluntary in Ticino, Neuchâtel, and Geneva, while Vaud levies no church tax and meets church costs from general taxation.

=== Tithes and tithe law in England before reform ===
Excerpts from Sir William Blackstone, Commentaries on the Laws of England:

==== Definition and classification and those liable to pay tithes ====
. . . tithes; which are defined to be the tenth part of the increase, yearly arising and renewing from the profits of lands, the stock upon lands, and the personal industry of the inhabitants:

the first species being usually called predial, as of corn, grass, hops, and wood;
the second mixed, as of wool, milk, pigs, &c, consisting of natural products, but nurtured and preserved in part by the care of man; and of these the tenth must be paid in gross:
the third personal, as of manual occupations, trades, fisheries, and the like; and of these only the tenth part of the clear gains and profits is due.

...

in general, tithes are to be paid for every thing that yields an annual increase, as corn, hay, fruit, cattle, poultry, and the like; but not for any thing that is of the substance of the earth, or is not of annual increase, as stone, lime, chalk, and the like; nor for creatures that are of a wild nature, or ferae naturae, as deer, hawks, &c, whose increase, so as to profit the owner, is not annual, but casual.

==== History ====
We cannot precisely ascertain the time when tithes were first introduced into this country. Possibly they were contemporary with the planting of Christianity among the Saxons, by Augustin the monk, about the end of the fifth century. But the first mention of them, which I have met with in any written English law, is in a constitutional decree, made in a synod held A.D. 786, wherein the payment of tithes in general is strongly enjoined. This canon, or decree, which at first bound not the laity, was effectually confirmed by two kingdoms of the heptarchy, in their parliamentary conventions of estates, respectively consisting of the kings of Mercia and Northumberland, the bishops, dukes, senators, and people. Which was a few years later than the time that Charlemagne established the payment of them in France, and made that famous division of them into four parts; one to maintain the edifice of the church, the second to support the poor, the third the bishop, and the fourth the parochial clergy.

==== Beneficiaries ====
And upon their first introduction (as hath formerly been observed), though every man was obliged to pay tithes in general, yet he might give them to what priests he pleased; which were called arbitrary consecrations of tithes: or he might pay them into the hands of the bishop, who distributed among his diocesan clergy the revenues of the church, which were then in common. But, when dioceses were divided into parishes, the tithes of each parish were allotted to its own particular minister; first by common consent, or the appointment of lords of manors, and afterwards by the written law of the land. ...It is now universally held, that tithes are due, of common right, to the parson of the parish, unless there be a special exemption. This parson of the parish, we have formerly seen, may be either the actual incumbent, or else the appropriator of the benefice: appropriations being a method of endowing monasteries, which seems to have been devised by the regular clergy, by way of substitution to arbitrary consecrations of tithes.

==== Exemptions ====
We observed that tithes are due to the parson of common right, unless by special exemption: let us therefore see, thirdly, who may be exempted from the payment of tithes ... either in part or totally, first, by a real composition; or secondly, by custom or prescription.

First, a real composition is when an agreement is made between the owner of the lands, and the parson or vicar, with the consent of the ordinary and the patron, that such lands shall for the future be discharged from payment of tithes, by reason of some land or other real recompence given to the parson, in lieu and satisfaction thereof.

Secondly, a discharge by custom or prescription, is where time out of mind such persons or such lands have been, either partially or totally, discharged from the payment of tithes. And this immemorial usage is binding upon all parties, as it is in its nature an evidence of universal consent and acquiescence; and with reason supposes a real composition to have been formerly made. This custom or prescription is either de modo decimandi, or de non-decimando.

A modus decimandi, commonly called by the simple name of a modus only, is where there is by custom a particular manner of tithing allowed, different from the general law of taking tithes in kind, which are the actual tenth part of the annual increase. This is sometimes a pecuniary compensation, as twopence an acre for the tithe of land : sometimes it is a compensation in work and labour, as that the parson shall have only the twelfth cock of hay, and not the tenth, in consideration of the owner's making it for him: sometimes, in lieu of a large quantity of crude or imperfect tithe, the parson shall have a less quantity, when arrived to greater maturity, as a couple of fowls in lieu of tithe eggs; and the like. Any means, in short, whereby the general law of tithing is altered, and a new method of taking them is introduced, is called a modus decimandi, or special manner of tithing.

A prescription de non-decimando is a claim to be entirely discharged of tithes, and to pay no compensation in lieu of them. Thus the king by his prerogative is discharged from all tithes. So a vicar shall pay no tithes to the rector, nor the rector to the vicar, for ecclesia decimas non-folvit ecclesiae. But these personal to both the king and the clergy; for their tenant or lessee shall pay tithes of the same land, though in their own occupation it is not tithable. And, generally speaking, it is an established rule, that in lay hands, modus de non-decimando non-valet. But spiritual persons or corporations, as monasteries, abbots, bishops, and the like, were always capable of having their lands totally discharged of tithes, by various ways: as

1. By real composition :
2. By the pope's bull of exemption :
3. By unity of possession; as when the rectory of a parish, and lands in the same parish, both belonged to a religious house, those lands were discharged of tithes by this unity of possession :
4. By prescription; having never been liable to tithes, by being always in spiritual hands :
5. By virtue of their order; as the knights templars, cistercians, and others, whose lands were privileged by the pope with a discharge of tithes. Though, upon the dissolution of abbeys by Henry VIII, most of these exemptions from tithes would have fallen with them, and the lands become tithable again; had they not been supported and upheld by the Suppression of Religious Houses Act 1539 (31 Hen. 8. c. 13) which enacted, that all persons who should come to the possession of the lands of any abbey then dissolved, should hold them free and discharged of tithes, in as large and ample a manner as the abbeys themselves formerly held them.

And from this original have sprung all the lands, which, being in lay hands, do at present claim to be tithe-free: for, if a man can shew his lands to have been such abbey lands, and also immemorially discharged of tithes by any of the means before-mentioned, this is now a good prescription de non-decimando. But he must shew both these requisites; for abbey lands, without a special ground of discharge, are not discharged of course; neither will any prescription de non-decimando avail in total discharge of tithes, unless it relates to such abbeylands.

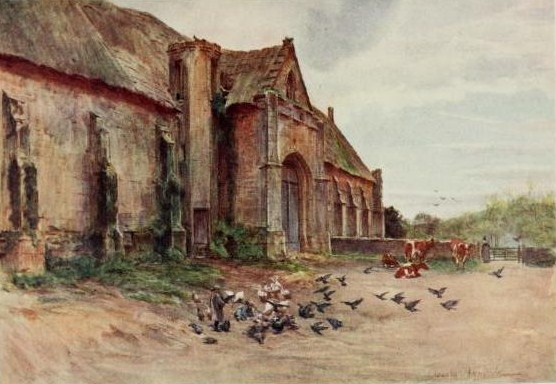
The Tithe Barn, Abbotsbury, Dorset (scene of the sheep-shearing in Thomas Hardy's Far from the Madding Crowd)

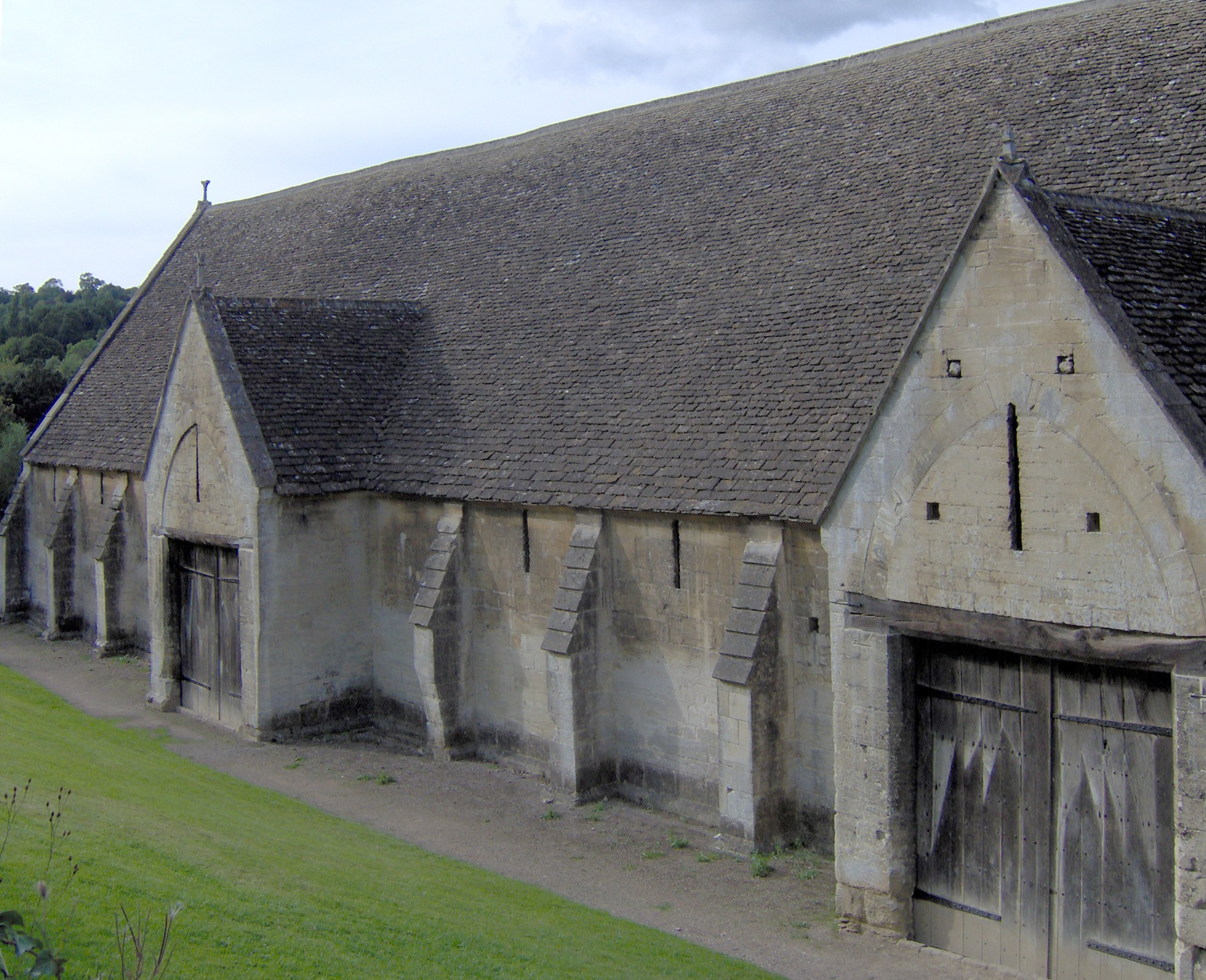
Tithe barn at Bradford on Avon, West Wiltshire

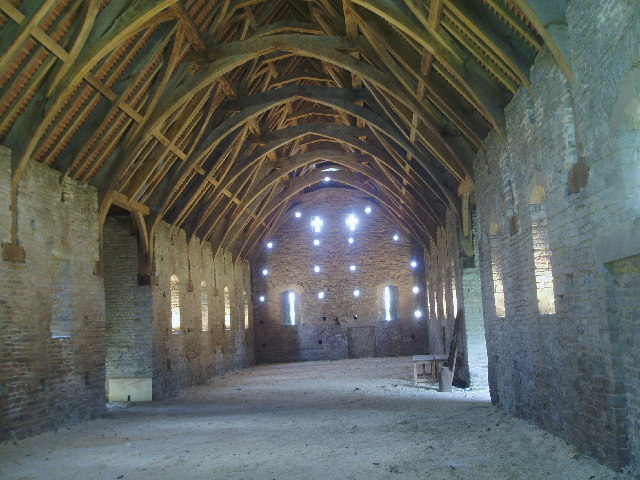
Interior of the medieval tithe barn at Pilton, Somerset

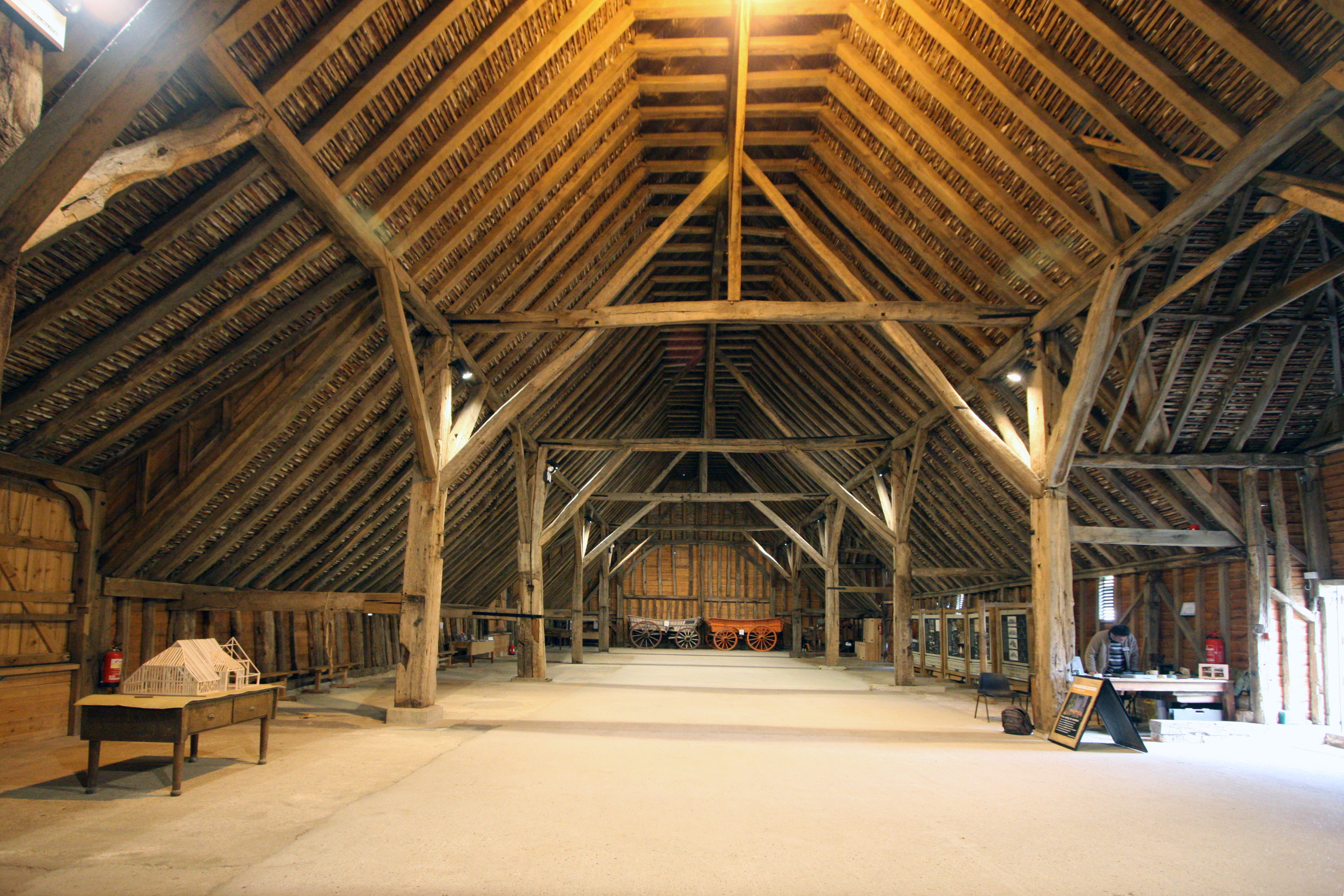
Grange Barn, Coggeshall, Essex; the timber has been dated to between 1130 and 1270.

== Islam ==
Zakāt (Arabic: زكاة [zækæːh]) or "alms giving", one of the Five Pillars of Islam, is the giving of a small percentage of one's assets to charity. It serves principally as the welfare contribution to poor and deprived Muslims, although others may have a rightful share. It is the duty of an Islamic state not just to collect zakat but to distribute it fairly as well.

Zakat is payable on three kinds of assets: wealth, production, and animals. The more well-known zakat on wealth is 2.5 per cent of accumulated wealth, beyond one's personal needs. Production (agricultural, industrial, renting, etc.), is subject to a 10 per cent or 5 per cent zakat (also known as Ushur (عُشر), or "one-tenth"), using the rule that if both labor and capital are involved, 5% rate is applied, if only one of the two are used for production, then the rate is 10 per cent. For any earnings that require neither labor nor capital, like finding underground treasure, the rate is 20 per cent. The rules for zakat on animal holdings are specified by the type of animal group and tend to be fairly detailed.

Muslims fulfill this religious obligation by giving a fixed percentage of their surplus wealth. Zakat has been paired with such a high sense of righteousness that it is often placed on the same level of importance as performing the five-daily repetitive ritualised prayer (salat). Muslims see this process also as a way of purifying themselves from their greed and selfishness and also safeguarding future business. In addition, Zakat purifies the person who receives it because it saves him from the humiliation of begging and prevents him from envying the rich. Because it holds such a high level of importance the "punishment" for not paying when able is very severe. In the 2nd edition of the Encyclopaedia of Islam it states, "...the prayers of those who do not pay zakat will not be accepted". This is because without Zakat a tremendous hardship is placed on the poor which otherwise would not be there. Besides the fear of their prayers not getting heard, those who are able should be practicing this third pillar of Islam because the Quran states that this is what believers should do.

Non-Muslims (able-bodied adult males of military age) living in an Islamic state are required to pay Jizya, this exempts them from military service and they do not pay Zakat.

Ismaili Muslims pay tithes to their spiritual leader the Aga Khan, known by the Gujarati language term dasond, which in turn refers to one-eighth of the earned income of the community member.

== Sikhism ==
Daswandh (Punjabi: ਦਸਵੰਧ), sometimes spelled Dasvandh, is the one-tenth part (or 10 per cent) of one's income that should be donated in the name of the God, according to Sikh principles.

== Non-religious ==
Outside religion, there are also organizations that encourage secular tithing.

Giving What We Can promotes a public commitment to donate at least 10% of one's income to the most effective charities.

== See also ==
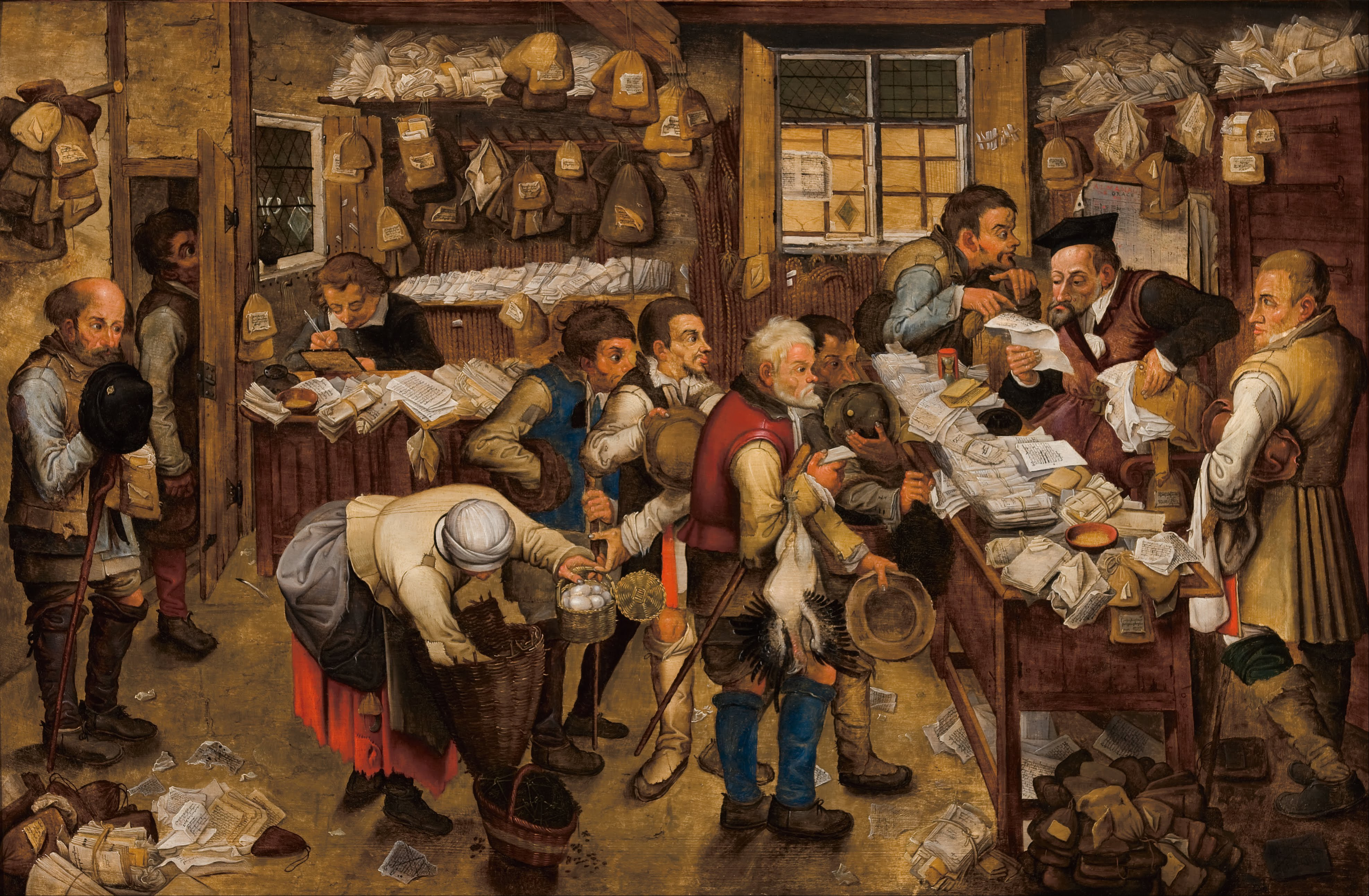
The Village Lawyer or The Tax Collector's Office by Pieter Brueghel the Younger

- Alms, giving to others as an act of virtue
- Charity
- Church of the Tithes in Kyiv
- Council on the Disposition of the Tithes
- Peter's Pence
- Pittance
- Freedom of religion by country
- Tithe: A Modern Faerie Tale novel by Holly Black
- Tithe dispute
- Tithing, historic English legal, administrative or territorial unit
- Zakat, form of alms-giving treated in Islam as a religious obligation or tax

== Bibliography ==
- Albright, W. F. and Mann, C. S. Matthew, The Anchor Bible, Vol. 26. Garden City, New York, 1971.
- The Assyrian Dictionary of the Oriental Institute of the University of Chicago, Vol. 4 "E." Chicago, 1958.
- Fitzmyer, Joseph A. The Gospel According to Luke, X-XXIV, The Anchor Bible, Vol. 28A. New York, 1985.
- Grena, G.M. (2004). LMLK—A Mystery Belonging to the King vol. 1. Redondo Beach, California: 4000 Years of Writing History. ISBN 0-9748786-0-X.
- Speiser, E. A., Genesis, The Anchor Bible, Vol.1. Garden City, New York, 1964.
- Kelly, Russell Earl, "Should the Church Teach Tithing? A Theologian's Conclusions about a Taboo Doctrine," IUniverse, 2001.
- Matthew E. Narramore, "Tithing: Low-Realm, Obsolete & Defunct" – April 2004 – (ISBN 0-9745587-02)
- Croteau, David A., "You Mean I Don't Have to Tithe?: A Deconstruction of Tithing and a Reconstruction of Post-Tithe Giving" (McMaster Theological Studies)
