= Law of consecration =

Commandment in the Latter Day Saint movement

The law of consecration is a commandment in the Latter Day Saint movement in which adherents promise to dedicate their lives and material substance to the church. It was first referred to in 1831 by Joseph Smith.

== Origins ==
On February 4, 1831, Smith received a revelation calling Edward Partridge to be the first bishop of the church. Five days later, on February 9, 1831, Smith received another revelation detailing the law of consecration.

As practiced by the Latter Day Saints in Smith's day, the law of consecration was for the support of the poor and to ensure that all members would be "equal according to his family, according to his circumstances and his wants and needs." Adherents were asked to voluntarily deed, or consecrate, their property to the Church of Christ, and the church then would assign to each member a "stewardship" of property "as much as is sufficient for himself and family." If consecrated property became more than was sufficient for the assigned steward, the "residue" was "to be consecrated unto the bishop" kept for the benefit of "those who have not, from time to time, that every man who has need may be amply supplied and receive according to his wants."

Under Smith, members attempted to implement the law of consecration through the establishment of the United Order, but it was never fully instituted due to conflict and disagreements.

== The Church of Jesus Christ of Latter-day Saints ==
During the 1850s, Brigham Young, leader of the Church of Jesus Christ of Latter-day Saints (LDS Church), attempted to revive the law of consecration. The United States Congress used this practice to delay granting land ownership to Utah Territory. Under scrutiny from the national press and facing advancing federal troops, the church dropped the plan in 1857 in favor of the law of tithing. Since that time, the LDS Church has not asked its members to give all of their property to the church: leaders have taught that members "are not now required to live the law of consecration". However, adherents covenant with God to accept the law of consecration as part of the temple endowment ceremony.

In the 1970s, LDS Church apostle Bruce R. McConkie stated that "[t]he law of consecration is that we consecrate our time, our talents, and our money and property to the cause of the Church: such are to be available to the extent they are needed to further the Lord's interests on earth."

Rather than fully living the United Order to keep the law of consecration, members are asked to tithe their income to support the church, to pay a generous monthly fast offering to care for the poor, and to donate their time and talents in assisting in the operation of the church.

Adherents believe that the law of consecration will be fully practiced in the future, including during the millennium after the Second Coming of Jesus.

== Mormon fundamentalism ==
In some Mormon fundamentalist sects, including the Fundamentalist Church of Jesus Christ of Latter-Day Saints and the Apostolic United Brethren, adherents live the law of consecration by deeding their homes and other personal property to the church, which then administers it to members as needed.

== See also ==
- Bishop's storehouse
- Tithing (Latter Day Saints)
