= Tithing declaration =

Tithing declaration, formerly called tithing settlement, is the name of a formalized series of meetings held at local congregations of the Church of Jesus Christ of Latter-day Saints (LDS Church). During tithing settlement, each member of the church is individually interviewed by the bishop or branch president of the congregation and asked to declare whether he or she has paid a full tithe to the church, which is defined as ten per cent of the member's income. Tithing settlement meetings are generally held in November or December.

During the meeting, each member is given a copy of his or her donation record for the year, and asked to confirm it is correct.

Each church member declares one of the following tithing statuses, as defined by the church:

- Full-tithe payers have paid one-tenth of their income as tithing. (Full-time missionaries and those completely dependent on church welfare assistance are also considered full tithe-payers.)
- Part-tithe payers have paid tithing, but the amount is less than one-tenth of their income.
- Non-tithe payers have not paid tithing during the year and (in the view of the church) are not exempt from paying tithing.
- Previously, Exempt members had no income and paid no tithing, but they declare that they would have paid a full tithe if they had income. But it appears that this classification has been recently removed.

Church members are invited to make a payment to correct any deficiency before the records are closed for year-end. If a church member does not participate or attend a tithing settlement meeting, the bishop or branch president declares a tithing status in their behalf. Each year, the tithing status of every member is recorded and sent to church headquarters in Salt Lake City, Utah.

Payment of tithing is a core doctrine of the church for all members, including children. Church members must declare themselves to be "full-tithe payers" in order to receive a temple recommend and attend one of the church's temples. However, that is done in a separate meeting from the tithing settlement.

The LDS Church uses the honor system and personal accountability of the individual tithe payer. It is not the church's general position to question the honesty of tithe payers. The church predominantly accepts the status declared by the tithe payer through counsel and consideration of the leaders. It is up to the individual tithe payer to determine and in turn declare to their leaders whether he or she feels they are a full tithe payer or not.

== Additional reading ==
- DuVall, Kenneth L.. "Why Tithing Settlement?", Ensign Magazine, 2009. Retrieved on 30 March 2020.
