= Black Mormons =

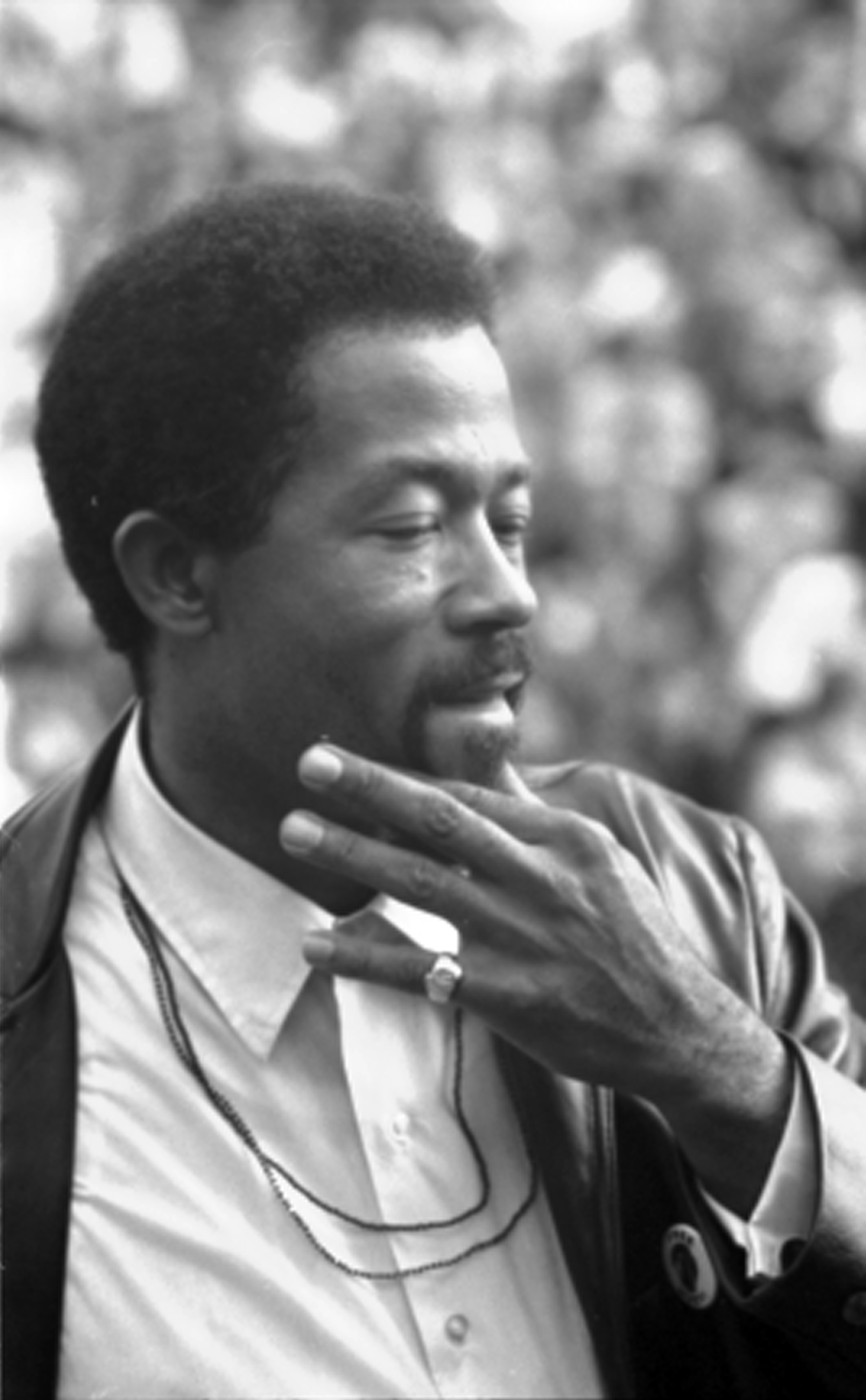
Eldridge Cleaver, former major player of the Black Panther Party, and Mormon convert

Since Mormonism's foundation, Black people have been members; however, the church placed restrictions on proselytization efforts among Black people. Before 1978, Black membership was small. It has since grown, and in 1997, there were approximately 500,000 Black members of the church (about 5% of the total membership), mostly in Africa, Brazil and the Caribbean. Black membership has continued to grow substantially, especially in West Africa, where two temples have been built. By 2018, an estimated 6% of members were Black worldwide. In the United States, approximately 1% of members are African American.

== Black Mormons in early Mormonism ==
The initial mission of the church was to proselytize to everyone, regardless of race or servitude status. When the church moved its headquarters to the slavery-permitting state of Missouri, they began changing its policies. In 1833, the church stopped admitting free people of color into the Church for unknown reasons. In 1835, the official church policy stated that enslaved individuals would not be taught about the church without their enslaver's consent, and the following year was expanded to not preach to enslaved people at all until after their enslavers were baptized into the LDS Church. Some Black people joined the church before the restrictions, such as Joseph T. Ball, Peter Kerr, and Walker Lewis, and others converted with their enslavers, including Elijah Abel and William McCary.

Jane Manning James had been born free and worked as a housekeeper in Joseph Smith's home. When she requested the temple ordinances, John Taylor took her petition to the Quorum of the Twelve, but her request was denied. When Wilford Woodruff became president of the church, he compromised and allowed Manning to be sealed to the family of Smith as a servant. This was unsatisfying to Manning as it did not include the saving ordinance of the endowment, and she repeated her petitions. She died in 1908. Church president Joseph F. Smith honored her by speaking at her funeral. She was posthumously endowed by proxy in 1979.

Other notable early Black LDS Church members included Green Flake (enslaved by John Flake), who was born into bondage on a plantation in Anson County, North Carolina, and a convert to the church and from whom he got his name. He was baptized as a member of the LDS Church at age 16 in the Mississippi River, but continued to be held in slavery. Following the death of John Flake, in 1850 his widow gave Green Flake to the church as tithing. Some members of the Black side of the Flake family say that Brigham Young emancipated their ancestor in 1854; however, at least one descendant states that Green was never freed.

Samuel D. Chambers was another early African American pioneer. He was baptized secretly at the age of thirteen when he was still enslaved in Mississippi. He was unable to join the main body of the church and lost track of them until after the Civil War. He was 38 when he had saved enough money to emigrate to Utah with his wife and son.

== Black Mormons in the United States ==
Before 1978, relatively few Black people who joined the church retained active membership. Those who did, often faced discrimination. LDS Church apostle Mark E. Petersen describes a Black family that tried to join the LDS Church: "[some white church members] went to the Branch President, and said that either the [Black] family must leave, or they would all leave. The Branch President ruled that [the Black family] could not come to church meetings." Discrimination also stemmed from church leadership. Under Heber J. Grant, the First Presidency sent a letter to stake president Ezra Taft Benson in Washington, D.C., advising that if two Black Mormon women were "discreetly approached" they would be happy sit in the back or side so as not to upset some white women who had complained about sitting near them in Relief Society.

On October 19, 1971, the Genesis Group was established as an auxiliary unit to the church. Its purpose was to serve the needs of Black members, including activating members and welcoming converts. It continues to meet on the first Sunday of each month in Utah. Don Harwell is the current president. When asked about racism in the church, he said "Now, is the church of Jesus Christ of Latter-day Saints racist? No, never has been. But some of those people within the church have those tendencies. You have to separate the two."

From 1985 to 2005, the church was well received among middle-class African-Americans, and African American membership grew from minuscule before 1978 to an estimated 5,000 to 10,000 in 2005. A 2007 study by the Pew Research Center found that 3% of American Mormons were Black. African Americans accounted for 9% of all converts in the United States. A 1998 survey by a Mormon and amateur sociologist, James W. Lucas, found that about 20 percent of Mormons in New York City were Black. Melvyn Hammarberg explained the growth: "There is a kind of changing face of the LDS Church because of its continuing commitment to work in the inner cities." Sociology and Religious Studies Professor Armand Mauss says African Americans are particularly attracted by the focus on promoting healthy families. However, these numbers still only represent a fraction of total church membership in the United States, suggesting that African Americans remain comparatively hesitant to join, partly because of the church's past. Still, Don Harwell, president of the Genesis Group, sees it as a sign that "People are getting past the stereotypes put on the church."

LDS historian Wayne J. Embry interviewed several Black LDS Church members in 1987 and reported that "all of the interviewees reported incidents of aloofness on the part of white members, a reluctance or a refusal to shake hands with them or sit by them, and racist comments made to them." Embry further reported that one Black church member "was amazingly persistent in attending Mormon services for three years when, by her report, no one would speak to her." Embry reports that "she [the same Black church member] had to write directly to the president of the LDS Church to find out how to be baptized" because none of her fellow church members would tell her.

In the United States, researchers Newell G. Bringhurst and Darron T. Smith, in their 2004 book Black and Mormon, wrote that since the 1980s "the number of African American Latter-day Saints does not appear to have grown significantly. Worse still, among those blacks who have joined, the average attrition rate appears to be extremely high." They cite a survey showing that the attrition rate among African American Mormons in two towns is estimated to be between 60 and 90 percent.

In 2007, journalist and church member, Peggy Fletcher Stack, wrote, "Today, many black Mormons report subtle differences in the way they are treated, as if they are not full members but a separate group. A few even have been called 'the n-word' at church and in the hallowed halls of the temple. They look in vain at photos of Mormon general authorities, hoping to see their own faces reflected there."

In 2015, Joseph W. Sitati a member of The First Quorum of the Seventy, gave a public statement in which he estimated that 15,000 immigrants from various African countries had joined the Church in the United States.

=== Wynetta Willis Martin ===
In 1970, Wynetta Willis Martin gained the distinction of being the first African-American member of the faculty at Brigham Young University (BYU) and one of the first two Black members of the Mormon Tabernacle Choir. She accepted it as her personal mission to prove to the world that there were in fact African-American Mormons and that the Mormons were not racist. She toured with the choir for two years before accepting her appointment on the faculty at BYU. She was employed in the training of nurses and tried to help them become more culturally aware. About the racial restriction policy, she said:

These two things: baptism and the Holy Ghost are the only requirements, contrary to popular belief, for entering the Celestial Kingdom and being with God for eternity if one is worthy. Therefore, the Priesthood covenants of the Temple which we are not allowed at this point are not really so crucial as popular belief dictates.

=== Joseph Freeman Jr. ===
Joseph Freeman, Jr. was the first African American to receive the Melchizedek priesthood after the 1978 revelation. Freeman was also the first Black member ever to receive church temple ordinances. On June 23, 1978, Freeman was sealed to his wife and five children in the Salt Lake Temple by then-apostle Thomas S. Monson.

== Black Mormons in South Africa ==
The church began proselyting to white English-speaking people in 1853, but very few Black South Africans joined the LDS Church before 1978. Dunn, who was the son of a Scottish father and a Zulu mother, is believed to be the first Black African convert baptized in Africa in 1905, though he did not remain an active member for long. Another early convert of African descent was William Paul Daniels, who joined the LDS Church in 1915 while visiting relatives in Utah. He met on multiple occasions with Joseph F. Smith before returning to South Africa.

In 1930, the LDS Church established a genealogy program to help male members trace their genealogy to a European country to determine their eligibility for the priesthood, with final approval for receiving the priesthood given by the mission president. Evan P. Wright served as mission president over the South Africa Mission 1948–1953. Wright repeatedly expressed to the First Presidency the difficulty in establishing the church in the region caused by the church-wide ban on ordaining men of Black African descent to the priesthood. This was especially problematic because previous general authorities required even men who appeared white to prove a total lack of Black African ancestry before they could be ordained and records were often unavailable or incomplete. Two missionaries had been given the duty to work on genealogy research for the purposes of establishing which people were eligible for the priesthood. David O. McKay was the first general authority to visit South Africa in 1954, and during his visit to the mission, he changed the policy to allow mission presidents to approve men to be ordained without any genealogical research in cases where "there is no evidence of his having Negro blood in his veins."

While other congregations would allow Black and white members to worship together, the South African government requested that LDS Black and white congregations meet separately. Apartheid laws restricted Black people's attendance in white churches only if church authorities thought they would make a disturbance. Since Black members did not meet with white ones and were denied the priesthood authority required to run their own meetings, Black membership remained low. There were some Black South Africans, like Moses Mahlangu, who were closely affiliated with the Church but not baptized. Mahlangu held regular worship meetings teaching from the Book of Mormon and spent large amounts of time teaching of the Book of Mormon to people in the African townships starting in the late 1960s. He was also in regular contact with the mission presidents. After the 1978 Revelation on Priesthood, Mahlangu was eventually baptized on September 6, 1980.

After the 1978 revelation, the South African government revoked its limits on visiting LDS missionaries, and the LDS church started actively proselyting to Black people.

In the early 1990s, the majority of Latter-day Saints in South Africa were English-speaking white people, mainly of British origin. At some point between 2000 and 2005 the LDS Church reached a point where half the members in South Africa were Black, and the percentage of Black members has continued to rise since then. Two Black South Africans have been called as mission presidents. One, Jackson Mkhabela, was called to serve as mission president in Zimbabwe. He had previously been an area seventy and his wife Dorah had been a member of the Young Women General Board. Mkhabela had become the first Black man to serve as a stake president in South Africa in 2005. The other, Thabo Lebethoa, was called to preside over the South Africa Cape Town Mission. He was serving as stake president of the Soweto Stake at the time of his call.

== Black Mormons in Brazil ==
Church leaders were initially hesitant to expand the church in Brazil because of the high percentage of people with mixed ancestry. Missionaries arrived in 1928 but were instructed to only work with German people living in the southern part of the country, since they were less likely to be Black. When the Brazilian government outlawed the use of non-Portuguese languages in public meetings in 1938, the mission switched from a German language mission to a Portuguese speaking one.

In the 1940s, mission president Rulon S. Howells began requiring potential converts to provide their genealogy, with the goal of establishing "racial purity" among converts. Howells and travelling general authorities instructed missionaries to avoid teaching Black people. Missionaries were only supposed to approach people who did not look Black. During the visits, they were supposed to discuss family history and look for evidence of Black ancestry. Finally, they presented a lineage lesson were they taught about the Curse of Cain and specifically asked if they had Black ancestry. If at any time during the lessons, it was discovered they had Black ancestry, they were discouraged from investigating the church. Occasionally, members who did not appear Black were baptized, but were later discovered to have Black heritage. In these cases, their records were marked and they were denied the priesthood. Because of these strict rules and regulations, very few people with Black ancestry joined the church. While missionaries were given significant teaching and instruction on the priesthood ban, church leadership purposely avoided talking to Brazilians about the priesthood ban, which left many Brazilians confused about the ban. Brazilian members often did not share American views on race, and did not want to implement the priesthood ban on Black men. This created significant friction between the Brazilian membership and the American leadership. This was partially alleviated in 1967 when the church allowed members who did not appear to be Black to have the priesthood even if they could not trace their genealogy out of Brazil. In 1978 the priesthood was extended to all male members, and the lineage lesson was dropped.

=== Helvécio Martins ===
Helvécio Martins was the first person of African descent to be a general authority (a leadership position) of the church. Martins was born in Brazil to parents descended from enslaved African people. He had found success in his professional life but felt unfulfilled with the religious life he was pursuing. The missionaries visited his home in 1972 while he was going through a difficult spiritual crisis. The missionaries visited his home late one night and were worried about how to teach an African since the church had not yet reversed its policy. Indeed, Martins' first question upon inviting the missionaries into his home concerned the church's attitude toward race. The spiritual experiences that the Martins family had while investigating the church superseded their concerns for the racial policy of priesthood restriction, and they were baptized. They experienced much resistance from members of their extended family and former church friends, but eventually found peace with them. Martins served in his ward as a Sunday school teacher. He was not troubled by the priesthood restriction, but others were. Often, members of the ward would ask him how he could remain a member of the church without the priesthood. It was never an issue for him. He had resolved the issue in his own mind and never expected to receive the priesthood.

When the announcement came, he describes his reaction and that of his wife as unbelieving. It was something for which they had not dared to hope. Martins then served as a member of a stake presidency, as a bishop, a mission president, and finally as a seventy. His son was one of the first three people of Black African descent to serve a full-time mission for the church in nearly 100 years.

== Black Mormons in Europe ==
In the mid-2010s the majority of converts to The Church of Jesus Christ of Latter-day Saints in European countries were immigrants from, refugees from, or students or other expatriates from various countries in Africa according to a statement given by Joseph W. Sitati of the First Quorum of the Seventy to a major academic conference at the University of Utah.

== Black Mormons in West Africa ==
The church began receiving letters from West Africa requesting information about the church in the 1940s. As the church began sending back literature, two LDS bookstores were formed. Because the Africans could not receive the priesthood, leaders hesitated sending missionaries. In 1960, David O. McKay sent Glen G. Fisher on a fact-finding mission to Africa, where he found thousands of people waiting for him. McKay decided to send missionaries, but the Nigerian government delayed issuing the necessary visas. After the Nigerian government agreed to issue the visas, several members of the Quorum of the Twelve Apostles expressed their opposition to teaching Black people and voted to cancel the program. Five months after the 1978 revelation, the first missionaries arrived in Nigeria. Anthony Obinna was one of the first to be baptized. Within one year there were more than 1,700 members in 35 branches in West Africa.

== Growth in Black membership ==
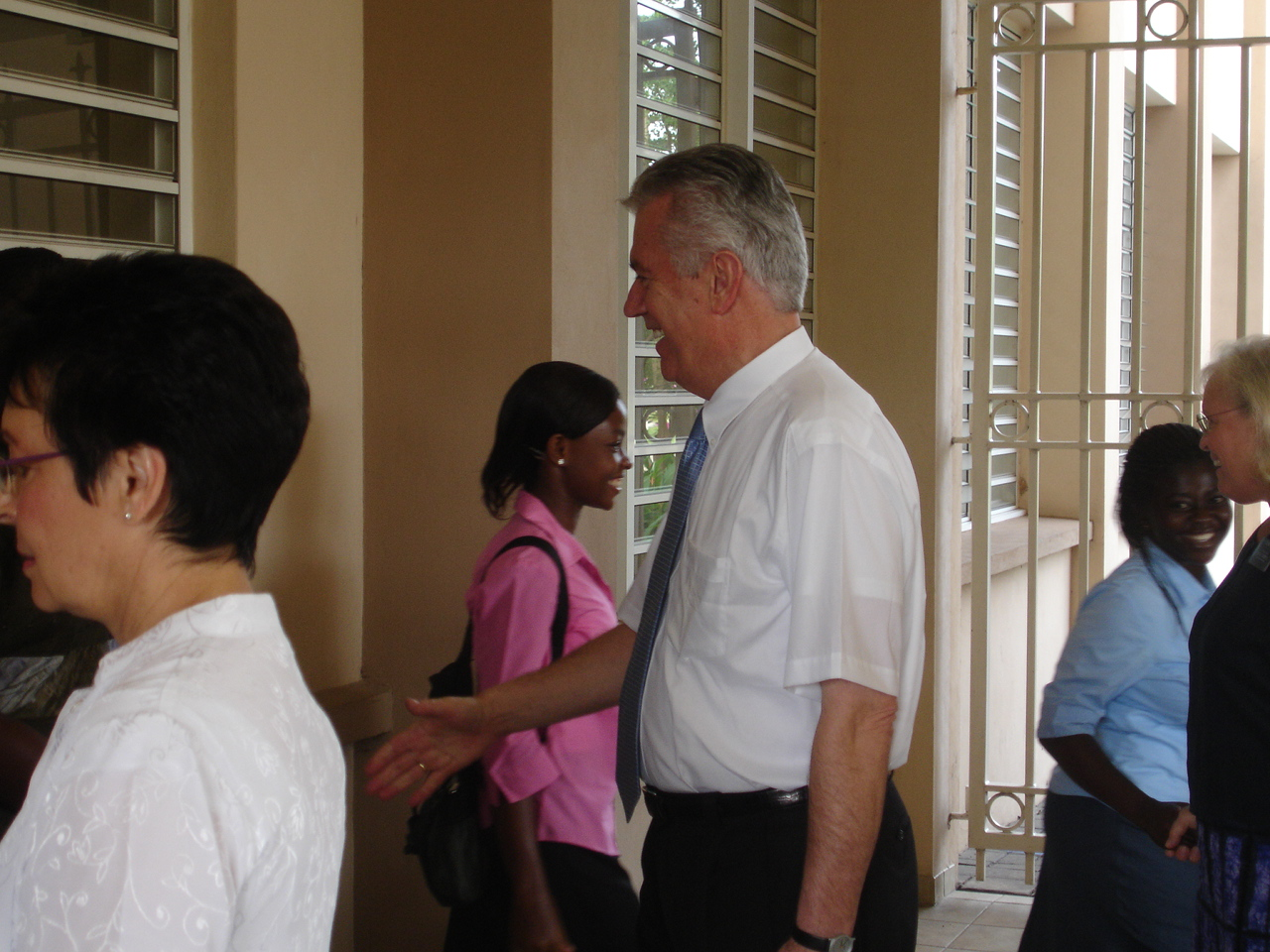
Dieter F. Uchtdorf visiting the Accra, Ghana LDS mission in 2007

The church had an increase in membership upon repealing the ban by experiencing rapid growth in predominately Black communities while other mainstream sects have been losing members. After 1978 LDS Church growth in Brazil was "especially strong" among Afro-Brazilians, especially in cities such as Fortaleza and Recife along the northeast coast of the country. By the 2010s, LDS Church growth was over 10% annually in Ghana, Ivory Coast, and some other countries in Africa. This was accompanied by some of the highest retention rates of converts anywhere in the church. At the same time, from 2009 to 2014, half of LDS converts in Europe were immigrants from Africa. In the Ivory Coast LDS growth has gone from one family in 1984 to 40,000 people as of early 2017. This growth lead to well over 30 congregations just in Abidjan by the early 2010s. The revelation also helped pave the way for the church's exponential growth in areas like Africa and the Caribbean. The church has been more successful among Black individuals outside the United States than inside, partly because there is less awareness of this past historic discrimination. In 2005, the church had some 120,000 members in West Africa, and the Aba Nigeria and Accra Ghana temples.

Regarding the LDS Church in Africa, professor Philip Jenkins noted in 2009 that LDS growth has been slower than that of other churches. He cited a variety of factors, including the fact that some European churches benefited from a long-standing colonial presence in Africa; the hesitance of the LDS church to expand missionary efforts into Black Africa during the priesthood ban, resulting in "missions with white faces"; the observation that the other churches largely made their original converts from native non-Christian populations, whereas Mormons often draw their converts from existing Christian communities. The church also has had special difficulties accommodating African cultural practices and worship styles, particularly polygamy, which has been renounced categorically by the LDS Church, but is still widely practiced in Africa. Commenting that other denominations have largely abandoned trying to regulate the conduct of worship services in Black African churches, Jenkins wrote that the LDS Church "is one of the very last churches of Western origin that still enforces Euro-American norms so strictly and that refuses to make any accommodation to local customs."

== Black people in church leadership ==
No member of the two highest governing bodies, the First Presidency and the Quorum of the Twelve Apostles, has to date been Black. There have been several Black members of the General Authority Quorums of the Seventy; and, as of 2013, Brazilian Helvécio Martins (a member of the Second Quorum of the Seventy from 1990 to 1995), Joseph W. Sitati (from Kenya) and Edward Dube (from Zimbabwe), both members of the First Quorum of the Seventy, have served as general authorities. Other Black members have served as area seventies, particularly in the Third Quorum of the Seventy, which includes the church's Africa Southeast, Africa West, Europe, and Europe East areas. In 2020 Ahmed Corbett, an African-American raised in West Philadelphia and resident in New Jersey for most of his life from about age 18, but recently moved to Utah, was called as a member of the Young Men General Presidency.

Since Russell M. Nelson has become president of The Church of Jesus Christ of Latter-day Saints the rate of calling Black general authorities has significantly increased. In his four years as president of the Church through 2021 he had called four Black men as general authorities. These were Peter M. Johnson who became the first African-American general authority in 2019 In 2020 Thierry K. Mutombo from the DR Congo (although serving as mission president in Baltimore Maryland at the time of his call) and Adeyinka A. Ojediran of Nigeria were called as general authorities. in 2021, Alfred Kyungo, also from the DR Congo, was called as a general authority.

The first African member of the Relief Society general board was chosen in 2003, and she shared her testimony at the general meeting of the Relief Society in September 2003. In February 2014, Dorah Mkhabela, a Black South African, was made a member of the Young Women General Board. She became the first Black woman to give a prayer at the Women's Meetings of General Conference in September 2014.

In 2005 Mauss commented "As far as leadership is concerned, the role of the various minorities in Mormonism as a whole is not yet very great, but it is growing, and it is crucial in parts of the world outside the U.S." although it is unclear how up to date his views were even in that year. Approximately 5% of church members have African ancestry (mostly in congregations in Africa, South America, and the Caribbean).

== Notable Black Mormons ==
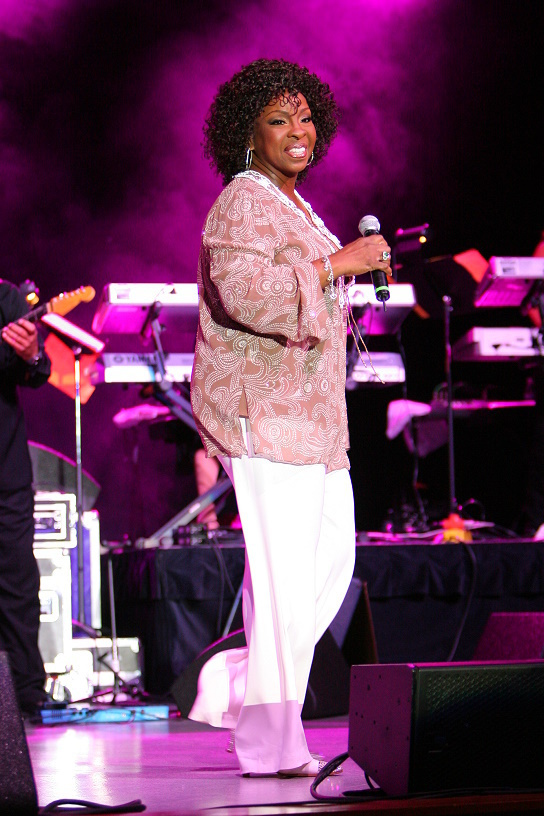
Since her baptism in 1997, Gladys Knight has strived to raise awareness of Black people in the LDS church.

- Ezekiel Ansah, Ghanaian-born football player.
- Thurl Bailey, basketball player and singer.
- Alex Boyé, actor and musician.
- Alan Cherry, Latter-day Saint singer and actor.
- Eldridge Cleaver, former Black Panther Party leader.
- Edward Dube, member of the First Quorum of the Seventy.
- Zavier Gozo, professional footballer for Crystal Palace
- Skyler Higley, Comedy Writer, adopted as a child by white, Mormon Parents
- Alvin B. Jackson, Utah State Senator
- Frank Jackson, basketball player
- Jane Manning James, one of the first Black members of the church
- Peter M. Johnson, the first African-American General Authority
- Ebenezer Joshua, first Prime Minister of St. Vincent and the Grenadines.
- Gladys Knight, who joined the church in 1997, created and now directs the LDS choir Saints Unified Voices.
- Emmanuel A. Kissi, Ghanaian medical doctor and writer.
- Mia Love, former mayor of Saratoga Springs, Utah, and former member of the United States House of Representatives.
- Julia Mavimbela, school teacher and community leader in South Africa
- Burgess Owens, football player, writer and current member of the United States House of Representatives.
- Jabari Parker, basketball player
- Niankoro Yeah Samake, presidential candidate in the country of Mali.
- Oral Ofori, former Customer and Public Relations Officer of Embassy of Ghana, Washington, D.C. who joined the church in January 2009.
- Joseph W. Sitati, member of the First Quorum of the Seventy.
- Catherine Stokes, former deputy director of the Illinois Department of Public Health, in August 2010 she was one of the original 13 members of the Deseret News Editorial Advisory Council.
- Winston Wilkinson, American politician.

== See also ==
- 1978 Revelation on Priesthood
- Black people and early Mormonism
- Black people and Mormonism
- Black people in Mormon doctrine
- Joseph Freeman (Mormon)
- Genesis Group
- Mormonism and Pacific Islanders
- Mormonism and slavery
