= Mostert =

Mostert or Mostaert is a Dutch and Afrikaans metonymic occupational surname. Meaning "mustard", it originally referred to a mustard miller or salesman. The Middle Dutch spelling Mostaert and modern Dutch spelling Mosterd are among variant forms of the surname. People with these surnames include:

- Chaz Mostert (born 1992), Australian racing driver
- Chris Mostert (born ca. 1950), Dutch saxophonist
- Franco Mostert (born 1990), South African rugby player
- Frederick Mostert (born 1959), South African trademark attorney and legal writer
- Gerhard Mostert (born 1984), South African rugby player
- Heinz Mostert (born 1949), German football defender
- Henk Mostert (1925–2002), Dutch correspondence chess player and president
- Herman Mostert (born 1969), South African rugby player
- JP Mostert (born 1988), South African rugby player
- Joseph Mostert (1912–1967), Belgian middle-distance runner
- Karla Mostert (born 1990), South African netball player
- Mark Mostert (born 1950s), South African-born American non-fiction writer
- Mary Mostert (1929–2016), American Mormon missionary and writer
- Natasha Mostert, South African novelist and screenwriter
- Nicol Mostert (born 1985), South African rugby player
- Phil Mostert (1898–1972), South African rugby player
- Raheem Mostert (born 1992), American football running back

Mostaert

- Antoon Mostaert (1881–1971), Belgian Roman Catholic missionary in Inner Mongolia
- Frans Mostaert (1528–1598), Flemish landscape painter, twin brother of Gillis
- Gillis Mostaert (1528–1560), Flemish landscape painter, twin brother of Frans
- Jan Mostaert (c.1475–1553), Dutch portrait painter, possibly grandfather of Frans and Gillis

== See also ==
- Mostert's Mill, historic windmill in Cape Town, South Africa
- Moster (disambiguation)
