= Peter M. Johnson =

First African-American LDS Church General Authority

General Authority Seventy
- April 6, 2019
- Called by: Russell M. Nelson

Personal details
- Born: Peter Matthew Johnson; November 29, 1966 (age 58); New York City, New York, United States
- Known For: first African-American General Authority of the Church of Jesus Christ of Latter-day Saints
- Alma mater: Southern Utah University (B.S., M.S.), Arizona State University (Ph.D.)
- Occupation: accountant, professor of accountancy
- Employer: Grant Thornton International, Brigham Young University–Hawaii, Brigham Young University, University of Alabama
- Spouse(s): Stephanie Lyn Chadwick
- Children: 4
- Website: Peter M. Johnson

Peter M. Johnson (born November 29, 1966) is a general authority seventy of the Church of Jesus Christ of Latter-day Saints (LDS Church). He is the first African-American general authority in church history.

Johnson was born and raised in Queens, New York City. In his early teens, he was a rapper performing at wedding receptions, high school dances, and block parties. In New York, Johnson became a Muslim, learning at the Nation of Islam at about age 12.

When he was 14 years old, Johnson's mother brought him to Hawaii to live with her. In Hawaii, Johnson played basketball and eventually went to Brigham Young University–Hawaii on a basketball scholarship. He met with Latter-day Saint missionaries and was encouraged to join the LDS Church by one of his religion professors, but did not at that time. The next year he transferred to Dixie State College, where he continued to play basketball. He eventually was baptized as a member of the LDS Church while in Hawaii after his first year at Dixie State. After he completed his second year at Dixie State, Johnson served as a missionary for the LDS Church in the Alabama Birmingham Mission.

Johnson attended Southern Utah University (SUU) and obtained both a bachelor's degree and a master's degree in accounting. He played for the SUU basketball team scoring 753 total points and was named the team MVP after the 1990–91 season. Following his graduation in 1992, he began working for the Salt Lake accounting firm Grant Thornton International as a staff accountant.

== Career in academia ==
After working in the industry, he decided to turn towards a career in academia. Johnson received a Ph.D. in accounting from Arizona State University. He then was a professor at BYU–Hawaii. In 2003, he joined the accounting faculty of Brigham Young University. In 2011, he joined the University of Alabama faculty where he was an Ernst and Young fellow and a tenured associate professor. During his time at the University of Alabama, he was appointed director of diversity and inclusion initiatives for the Culverhouse College of Business and president of the diversity section of the American Accounting Association, while teaching undergraduate and graduate courses in accounting. Johnson's areas of study are financial reporting, disclosures and firm valuation. In 2015, Johnson was among panelists at the Black Saints in the LDS Church conference.

== Church service ==
In the LDS Church, Johnson has held many leadership positions including stake financial clerk, ward Young Men president, ward mission leader, and counselor in the bishopric. In 2013, Johnson was called as president of the Bessemer Alabama Stake, becoming the first black man to serve in that role in Alabama.

In 2018, Johnson was called as an area seventy. In April 2019, he was called as a general authority seventy. Some news headlines incorrectly called him the first high-ranking "black" leader of the LDS Church, with those generally considered to be either Helvécio Martins or Joseph W. Sitati. They, along with Edward Dube, were all "black" general authorities before Johnson, but these men were, respectively, Brazilian, Kenyan, and Zimbabwean, so Johnson is the first African-American called to this position.

In October 2019, Johnson gave a talk in the church's General Conference entitled "Power to Overcome the Adversary ". The Salt Lake Tribune ran an article highlighting this as the first talk by an African-American at general conference. However, KSL modified this with the term "modern era", pre-1970 general conferences were much larger, and in the early 20th-century there were speakers simultaneously at multiple locations, so the claim would require more research than has been included.

In January 2020, the LDS Church announced that Johnson would begin service in July 2020 as president of the England Manchester Mission.

== Personal life ==
In 1990, Johnson married Stephanie Lyn Chadwick. Chadwick also played basketball at the college level. They are the parents of four children. Their daughters, Kiana and Whitney, both played college basketball and at one point both played on the SUU team.

== Selected publications ==
(All citations in APA format)

1. Caylor, M. L., Christensen, T. E., Johnson, P. M., & Lopez, T. J. (2015). Analysts’ and Investors’ Reactions to Consistent Earnings Signals. Journal of Business Finance & Accounting, 42(9-10), 1041-1074.
2. Johnson, P. M., Jurney, S., & Rodgers, T. C. (2015). How does the market process sequential earnings information?. Advances in accounting, 31(1), 55-67.
3. Hill, M. S., Johnson, P. M., Liu, K. X., & Lopez, T. J. (2015). Operational restructurings: where’s the beef?. Review of Quantitative Finance and Accounting, 45(4), 721-755.
4. Johnson, P. M., Lopez, T. J., & Sanchez, J. M. (2011). Special items: A descriptive analysis. Accounting Horizons, 25(3), 511-536..
5. Canace, T. G., Caylor, M. L., Johnson, P. M., & Lopez, T. J. (2010). The effect of Regulation Fair Disclosure on expectations management: International evidence. Journal of Accounting and Public Policy, 29(5), 403-423.
6. Brau, J. C., & Johnson, P. M. (2009). Earnings management in IPOs: Post-engagement third-party mitigation or issuer signaling?. Advances in Accounting, 25(2), 125-135.
7. Christensen, T. E., Lopez, T. J., & Johnson, P. M. (2007, June). Anticipating Future Performance Using the Current Earnings Expectation Path. AAA.
