= Mormon teachings on skin color =

Latter Day Saint teachings on race

Mormon teachings on skin color have evolved throughout the history of the Latter Day Saint movement, and have been the subject of controversy and criticism. Historically, in Mormonism's largest denomination the Church of Jesus Christ of Latter-day Saints (LDS Church), leaders beginning with founder Joseph Smith taught that dark skin was a sign of a curse from God. After his death in 1844, other leaders taught it was also a punishment for premortal unrighteousness. Since 2013, the church has officially disavowed these beliefs and now teaches that all people are equal in God's sight, regardless of skin color. The LDS Church since then has worked to promote racial equality and inclusion. Several other Mormon denominations, however continue to teach into the present day that skin color is related to curses or personal righteousness.

The LDS Church's earlier teachings and policies based on skin color were rooted in its canonized scriptures the Book of Mormon and Book of Abraham. In the Book of Mormon the Nephites, a group of ancient Americans who were descended from Israelites, were "white and exceedingly fair and delightsome". The Lamanites, on the other hand, were described as having "a skin of blackness" and were said to have been cursed with this condition as a punishment for their wickedness and rebellion against God. In his revisions of the King James Bible, and production of the Book of Abraham Smith traced Black skin to the Biblical curses placed on Cain and Ham, and linked the two by positioning Ham's Canaanite cursed posterity as matrilinear descendants of the previously cursed Cain. These discriminatory beliefs around skin color were reinforced by church leaders in the 19th and early 20th centuries, who taught that dark skin was a sign of inferiority and that those with dark skin were not as righteous as those with light skin. This belief was also used to justify LDS social segregation and other skin-color-based policies within the church, such as denying Black women and men access to ordinances in the temple necessary for exaltation in the highest tier of heaven. The temple and priesthood restrictions were removed in 1978, with the top leaders stating that all priesthood ordination would be practiced "without regard for race or color." A 2023 survey of over 1,000 former church members in the Mormon corridor found race issues in the church to be one of the top three reported reasons why they had disaffiliated.

== Teachings on White people's skin color ==
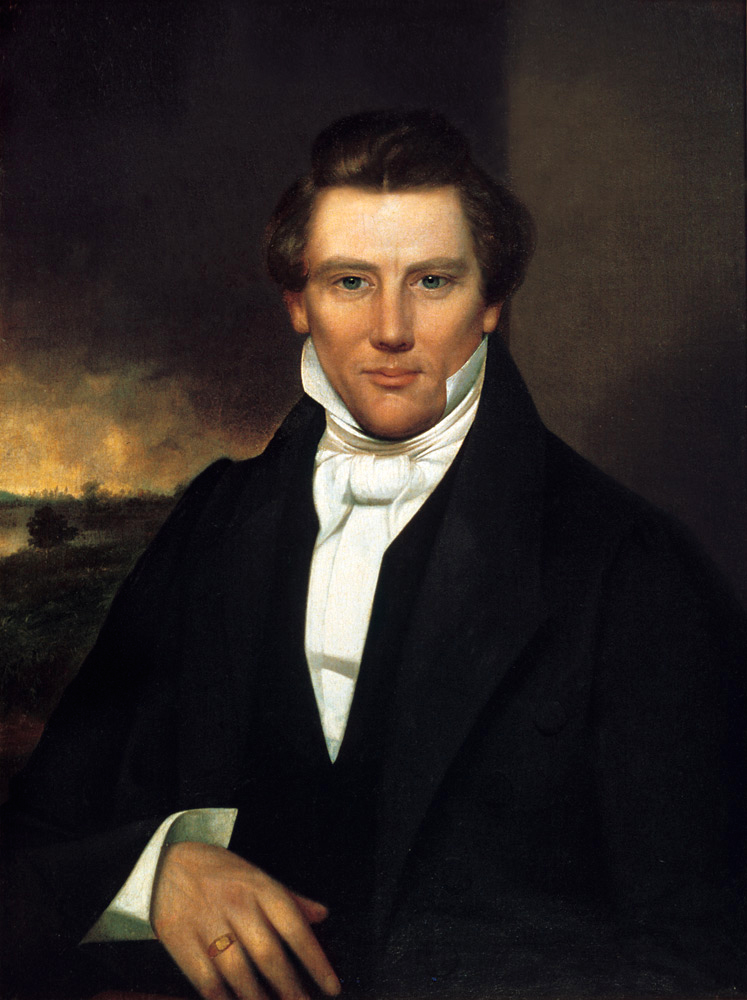
Mormonism's founder Joseph Smith was White.

Early church leaders taught the belief that after death and resurrection everyone in the celestial kingdom (the highest tier of heaven) would be "white in eternity." They often equated Whiteness with righteousness, and they also taught the belief that originally, God made his children White in his own image. Smith reported that in his vision Jesus had a "white complexion" and "blue eyes", a description confirmed in another reported vision by follower Anson Call. The church also taught that White apostates would have their skin darkened when they abandoned the faith. A 1959 report by the U.S. Commission on Civil Rights found that most Utah Mormons believed "by righteous living, the dark-skinned races may again become white and delightsome." For decades church leaders taught ideas from British Israelism (and its secular counterpart Anglo-Saxon Triumphalism) such as teachings that people of northwest European descent were a chosen and favored people by God and were descendants of the lost Tribe of Ephraim.

== Teachings on Black people's skin color ==
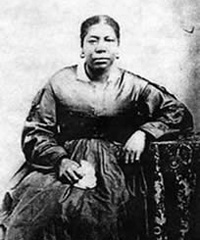
Jane Manning was an early church member and servant in Smith's household and followed Young to Utah. She petitioned church leadership to allow her to receive the temple endowment, but was repeatedly denied because of her skin color.

Smith believed that dark skin marked people of Black African ancestry as cursed by God. In his revisions of the King James Bible, and production of the Book of Abraham he traced their cursed state back to the curses placed on Cain and Ham, and linked the two curses within the Book of Abraham by positioning Ham's Canaanite cursed posterity as matrilinear descendants of the previously cursed Cain.

Smith's canonized scripture the Pearl of Great Price described the mark of Cain as dark skin, and church president Brigham Young stated, "What is the mark [of Cain]? You will see it on the countenance of every African you ever did see".

After Smith's death in 1844 and a six-month succession crisis, his most popular successor became Brigham Young. The Brighamite branch of Mormonism became the LDS Church. By 1844 one of the justifications top LDS church leaders used for discriminatory policies was the belief that some spirits were "fence sitters" when choosing between God or the devil, or were simply less virtuous in the premortal life, and thus, were born with Black skin as a punishment. Brigham Young rejected this pre-existence explanation, but the apostles Orson Pratt, Orson Hyde, and John Taylor all supported the concept, and it gained widespread acceptance among LDS members.

A 1959 report by the U.S. Commission on Civil Rights found that most Utah Mormons believed "by righteous living, the dark-skinned races may again become white and delightsome." Conversely, the church also taught that White apostates would have their skins darkened when they abandoned the faith, and until at least the 1960s in the temple endowment ceremony Satan was said to have black skin.

Several Black Mormons were told that they would become White. Hyrum Smith told Jane Manning James that God could give her a new lineage, and in her patriarchal blessing promised her that she would become "white and delightsome". In 1836 Elijah Abel was similarly promised he would "be made ... white in eternity". Darius Gray, a prominent Black Mormon, was told that his skin color would become lighter. In 1978, apostle LeGrand Richards stated that the curse of dark skin for wickedness and promise of White skin through righteousness only applied to Native Americans, and not to Black people.

In 2013, the LDS Church published an essay officially refuting these ideas for the first time, describing prior official church teachings justifying the restriction as racial "folk beliefs". It stated that Blackness in Latter-day Saint theology is a symbol of disobedience to God and not necessarily a skin color. One youth Sunday School teacher was removed from their position for teaching from this essay in 2015.

== Teachings on Native Americans' skin color ==
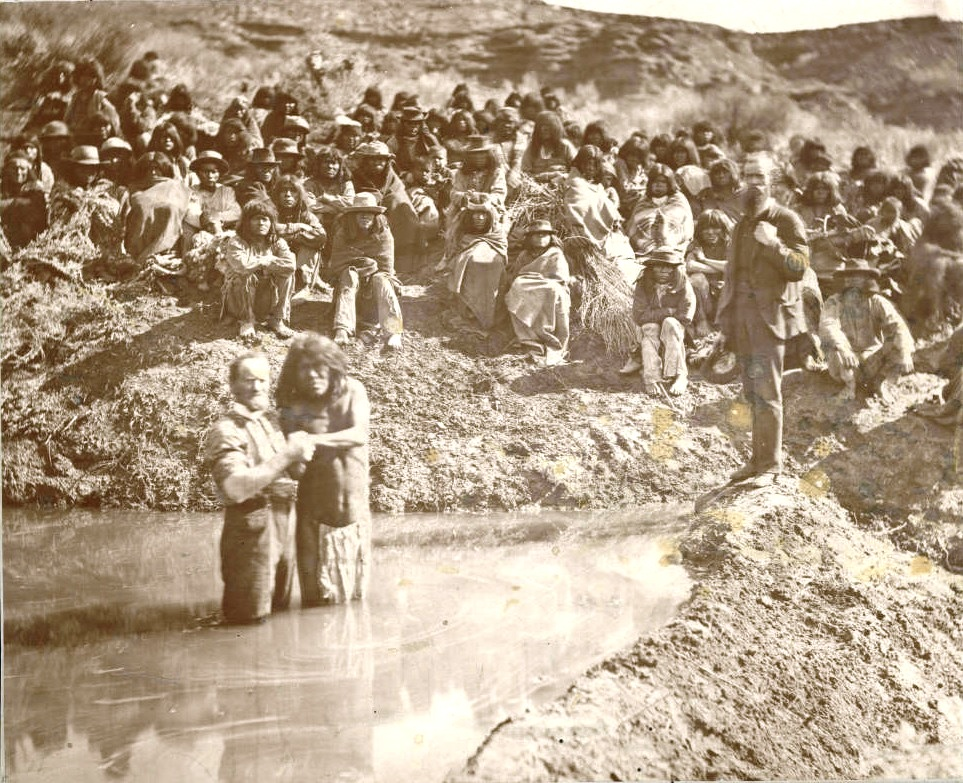
Shivwits Band of Paiute people being baptized into the LDS Church by missionaries in 1875.

Several church leaders have stated that The Book of Mormon teaches that Native Americans have dark skin (or the "curse of redness") because their ancestors (the Lamanites) were cursed by God, but if Native Americans follow church teachings, their dark skin will be removed. Not far into the narrative of The Book of Mormon God marks Lamanites (the presumed ancestors of Native Americans) with dark skin because of their iniquity, an act similar to the Bible's Curse of Cain which some Christians interpreted as the beginning of the Black race. The Book of Mormon passage states, "[God] had caused the cursing to come upon [the Lamanites] ... because of their iniquity ... wherefore, as they were White, and exceeding fair and delightsome, that they might not be enticing unto my people [the Nephites] the Lord God did cause a skin of blackness to come upon them." During the century between 1835 and 1947 the official LDS hymnbook had lyrics discussing a lightening of Native American skin color stating, "Great spirit listen to the Red Man's wail! ... Not many moons shall pass away before/ the curse of darkness from your skins shall flee". They taught that in the afterlife's highest degree of heaven Native American's skin would become "white in eternity" like everyone else. They often equated Whiteness with righteousness, and taught that originally God made his children White in his own image. A 1959 report by the U.S. Commission on Civil Rights found that most Utah Mormons believed "by righteous living, the dark-skinned races may again become 'white and delightsome'."

In 1953, President of the Quorum of the Twelve Apostles Joseph Fielding Smith stated, "After the people again forgot the Lord ... the dark skin returned. When the Lamanites fully repent and sincerely receive the gospel, the Lord has promised to remove the dark skin.... Perhaps there are some Lamanites today who are losing the dark pigment. Many of the members of the Church among the Catawba Indians of the South could readily pass as of the White race; also in other parts of the South." Additionally, in a 1960 LDS Church General Conference, apostle Spencer Kimball suggested that the skin of Latter-day Saint Native American was gradually turning lighter. Mormons believed that through intermarriage, the skin color of Native Americans could be restored to a "white and delightsome" state. Navajo general authority George Lee stated that he had seen some Native American members of the church upset over these teachings and that they did not want their skin color changed as they liked being brown, and so he generally avoided discussing the topic. Lee interpreted the teachings to mean everyone's skin would be changed to a dazzling white in the celestial kingdom. Kimball, however, suggested that the skin lightening was a result of the care, feeding, and education given to Native American children in the home placement program.

In 1981, church leaders changed a scriptural verse about Lamanites in The Book of Mormon from stating "they shall be a white and delightsome people" to stating "a pure and delightsome people". Thirty-five years later in 2016, the LDS Church made changes to its online version of The Book of Mormon in which phrases on the Lamanite's "skin of blackness" and them being a "dark, loathsome, and filthy" people were altered. In 2020, controversy over the topic was ignited again when the LDS church's recently printed manuals stated that the dark skin was a sign of the curse and the Lord placed the dark skin upon the Lamanites to keep the Nephites from having children with them. In recent decades, the LDS Church has condemned racism and increased its proselytization efforts and outreach in Native American communities, but it still faces accusations of perpetuating implicit racism by not acknowledging or apologizing for its prior discriminatory practices and beliefs.

== Teachings on Pacific Islanders' skin color ==
Church leaders have taught that people of the Pacific Islands descend from people of The Book of Mormon, accounting for their darker skin. Debate exists among LDS people scholars on whether they are descended from white Nephites or darker Lamanites. Scholar Bruce Sutton wrote that though they were descended from white Nephites, Pacific Islanders developed darker skin from their ancestors having children with Lamanites and/or exposure to the tropical sun. According to Marjorie Newton, LDS missionaries taught Pacific Islanders that they could once again become "white and delightsome". Modern genetic testing has not established any connection between Pacific Islanders and purported peoples of The Book of Mormon.

== Positions of other Mormon groups ==
- RLDS – In 1920, the Reorganized Church of Jesus Christ of Latter Day Saints (now called the Community of Christ), published "Whence Came the Red Man", a pamphlet which contained a summary of The Book of Mormon as well as the following statement, "two great camps ... began to quarrel bitterly among themselves. Part of them became the color of fine copper and the red brethren fought against the white."
- FLDS – The president of the Fundamentalist Church of Jesus Christ of Latter-Day Saints (FLDS) Warren Jeffs has taught the belief that Black skin is a curse because it denotes a black person's descent from Cain, and the devil brings evil to the Earth through people with Black skin.
- AUB – The Apostolic United Brethren (AUB) is a Utah-based, polygamous, fundamentalist group that separated itself from the LDS Church in 1929. As of 2018, it teaches the belief that people with Black skin are "Canaanites" who are under the curse of Cain. The term Cainite is usually used to refer to a descendant of Cain. The term Canaanite can denote a descendant of Ham's son Canaan or people from the similarly named region of Canaan.
- TLC – The True and Living Church of Jesus Christ of Saints of the Last Days (TLC), which branched off from the LDS church in 1990 and is based in Manti, Utah, taught the belief that the skin color of apostates would darken as recently as 1999.

== See also ==
- Anti-Mormonism
- The Bible and slavery
- The Bible and violence
- Christianity and violence
- Christian views on slavery
- Criticism of the Book of Mormon
- Criticism of the LDS Church
- History of Christian thought on persecution and tolerance
- Mormonism and violence
- Phrenology and the Latter Day Saint movement
