= Nairobi Kenya Temple =

Temple of the Church of Jesus Christ of Latter-day Saints

- Interactive map of Nairobi Kenya Temple
- Number: 204
- Dedication: 18 May 2025, by Ulisses Soares
- Site: 3.435 acres (1.390 ha)
- Floor area: 19,870 ft^{2} (1,846 m^{2})
- Official website • News & images

Church chronology
← Auckland New Zealand Temple	Nairobi Kenya Temple	→ Abidjan Ivory Coast Temple

Additional information
- Announced: 2 April 2017, by Thomas S. Monson
- Groundbreaking: 11 September 2021, by Joseph W. Sitati
- Open house: 17 April-3 May 2025
- Current president: Dominic Chelang-at Kogo
- Location: Nairobi, Kenya
- Coordinates: 1°17′39″S 36°52′54″E
- Baptistries: 1
- Ordinance rooms: 2
- Sealing rooms: 2

The Nairobi Kenya Temple is a temple of the Church of Jesus Christ of Latter-day Saints located in Nairobi, Kenya. Announced on April 2, 2017, by church president Thomas S. Monson during general conference. It is the church's first constructed in both Kenya and in East Africa. The temple serves members in Kenya and neighboring countries, including Uganda, Tanzania, Ethiopia, Rwanda, and South Sudan.

Located on a 3.435-acre (1.39 ha) site in Mountain View, Nairobi, the temple has a single-story design with a cast-in-place concrete frame and Portuguese Moleanos limestone exterior. Its architecture uses local cultural elements, such as the agapanthus flower motif, reflecting Kenya's prominence as a leading exporter of flowers in Africa. The interior includes two instruction rooms, two sealing rooms, and a baptistry, with native designs and artwork inspired by the Kenyan savanna.

The groundbreaking ceremony was held on September 11, 2021, presided over by Joseph W. Sitati, a general authority and president of the church's Africa Central Area. After construction was completed, a public open house was held from April 17 through May 3, 2025, excluding Sundays. The temple was dedicated on May 18, 2025, by Ulisses Soares of the Quorum of the Twelve Apostles.

== History ==
The Nairobi Kenya Temple was announced by church president Thomas S. Monson on April 2, 2017, during general conference.

On July 14, 2021, the church released an exterior rendering of the temple and announced that it would be constructed on a 3.435-acre (1.39 ha) property located at LR# 13646/4, Hinga Road, Mountain View, Nairobi. Preliminary plans called for a single-story structure encompassing approximately 19,870 square feet.

The groundbreaking ceremony took place on September 11, 2021, with Joseph W. Sitati presiding. Due to COVID-19 restrictions, in-person attendance was limited, but the ceremony was broadcast to meetinghouses and homes across Kenya and neighboring countries.

On January 13, 2025, the church announced the public open house that was held from April 17 to May 3, 2025 (excluding Sundays).

The temple was dedicated on May 18, 2025, by Ulisses Soares of the Quorum of the Twelve Apostles. The dedicatory session was broadcast to church units throughout the temple district.

== Design and architecture ==
The Nairobi Kenya Temple combines design with local cultural influences, like local flowers, and wall tones that were designed to match the Kenyan Savanna, reflecting both its spiritual significance to the church and the heritage of Kenya.

The temple is on a 3.435-acre (1.39 ha) plot at LR# 13646/4, Hinga Road, Mountain View, Nairobi. The landscaping uses native flora, including agapanthus (African lily), symbolizing purity and Kenya's status as a major exporter of flowers. A Christus statue is also located on the grounds.

It is a single-story building with a cast-in-place concrete frame and concrete block partitions. Its exterior features Portuguese Moleanos limestone, chosen for its natural light finish. The design includes a single attached end spire, circular patterns, and floral motifs inspired by the African lily.

The interior features floral motifs, including the agapanthus in art glass and decorative painting. The design draws inspiration from the Kenyan savanna, using neutral tones. The furniture reflects British colonial influences, and textiles use traditional African patterns. The flooring includes Milliken carpet, nylon rugs, and porcelain Cerim Marfil stone accented with Quartzite Blue and Verde Imperiale. The temple contains two instruction rooms, two sealing rooms, and one baptistry.

== Temple presidents ==
The church's temples are directed by a temple president and matron, each typically serving for a term of three years. The president and matron oversee the administration of temple operations and provide guidance and training for both temple patrons and staff.

Beginning when dedicated in 2025, the first president is Dominic Chelang-at Kogo, with Alice C. Kogo serving as matron.

== Admittance ==
After construction was completed, a public open house was held from April 17 through May 3, 2025, excluding Sundays. The temple was dedicated by Ulisses Soares on May 18, 2025.

Like all the church's temples, it is not used for Sunday worship services. To members of the church, temples are regarded as sacred houses of the Lord. Once dedicated, only church members with a current temple recommend can enter for worship.
