= SPIJØNGET =

Studio album by ByLwansta
- Released: June 30, 2022
- Recorded: 2018–2021
- Genre: Hip hop
- Label: NORMVL Sound
- Producers: ByLwansta (exec.); Kimosabe; Jaedon Daniel; Byron Thambu; Robot Koch; Sakhumzi Mngomeni; Al da 3rd

ByLwansta chronology
Your Absolutely Right EP (2016)	SPIJØNGET (2022)

Singles from SPIJØNGET
- 1. "KICKSTAND" Released: March 29, 2019; 2. "THE BIKE SONG" Released: February 7, 2020

SPIJØNGET is the debut studio album by South African rapper, producer and graphic designer ByLwansta. The album consists of a series of three 4-track EPs, ultimately making up the 12-track studio album.

== Background ==
Three years since the release of his Your Absolutely Right EP, ByLwansta went on an involuntary hiatus from releasing music, citing external pressures and anxiety as reasons that lead him to overthink his writing process, leaving him unable to write and release any new music. As a result, ByLwansta would shift his focus from writing to producing in 2018, and he would spend his breaks from freelance design creating beats and experimenting using FL Studio.

=== Chapter One ===
In February 2018, ByLwansta met bassist Giyani Shangase at a show in Durban. Curious about when ByLwansta was planning on playing live with a band, he suggested that they get together in the week for a rehearsal with 2 other musicians, Jaedon Daniel and Byron Thambu, thus forming the band NORMVLLY Busy. ByLwansta hosted a show in Cape Town with the band, as part of his NORMVL Agenda concert series, his first performance in the city. During their last rehearsal before the show, ByLwansta and Jaedon began to freestyle a melody and a chorus that would become a song called "STAY NAKED", which they would immediately perform at the show hours later. The following day, the band created and recorded the song at the Red Bull Studios.

Returning to some unfinished beats on his FL Studio, ByLwansta began to work towards completing Chapter One of The SPIJØNGET Series. Chapter One was released independently in March 2019, following his move to Johannesburg earlier in the year. "KICKSTAND", the EP's third track featuring PATFROMTHESLUMS, was released with French electronic music label, Kitsune Musique as a single. This would become ByLwansta's second opportunity for exposure to the European music scene after his appearance on COLORS in 2017.

=== Chapter Two ===
ByLwansta would spend the rest of 2019 touring the project in Europe and in the United States. He would unofficially begin working on Chapter Two in August, where he met German electronic music producer Robot Koch to create music commissioned by Pop-Kultur Festival. He would officially begin working on Chapter Two in October, after having "lived Chapter Two first before writing about it - and reflecting on it in the music".

ByLwansta announced that he was done recording for Chapter Two on 18 December via his Instagram, and soon began to roll out some of the project's visuals, namely a picture of two African Lilies on a black background, following it with various photos of gardens and bushes of the African Lily. He eventually revealed the EP's cover art on 24 January. A week later he revealed the first single would be his collaboration with Robot Koch, on a song titled "THE BIKE SONG".

== Title and concept ==
The title is a term coined ByLwansta, an acronym for Stop Postponing Ideas & Joylessly Øverthinking Newly-Generated Expressions & Thoughts, it's synonymous with "fuck it, just do it".

Inspired by his creative block and his inability to get past his overthinking, the term appeared in his mind as a response to a question he was asked by his then girlfriend about an episode of The Legend of Korra they were watching together, responding simply with "SPIJØNGET".

ByLwansta would go on to apply this new found rationale to his music, returning to four of the most complete song ideas that he had initially dismissed, hoping to finally part with them as what he would ultimately dub as phase one or chapter one of the SPIJØNGET.

== Tracklisting ==
Chapter One
No.	Title	Writer(s)	Producer(s)	Length
1.	"STAY NAKED" (featuring NORMVLLY Busy)	Lwandile Nkanyuza	Jaedon Daniel; Giyani Shangase; Byron Thambu	4:02
2.	"IT'S LATE"	Nkanyuza	ByLwansta	4:56
3.	"KICKSTAND" (featuring PATFROMTHESLUMS)	Nkanyuza	ByLwansta	3:53
4.	"THE HOMIE" (featuring Kimosabe)	Nkanyuza	ByLwansta, Kimosabe	5:36
Total length:				17:47

Chapter Two
No.	Title	Writer(s)	Producer(s)	Length
1.	"HOW 'BOUT NOW?" (featuring Lungelo Manzi)	Nkanyuza, Dlamini	ByLwansta	4:14
2.	"NIGHTCRAWLERZ" (featuring Kimosabe)	Nkanyuza, Nkanyuza	ByLwansta; Sakhumzi Mngomeni	4:08
3.	"THE BIKE SONG" (featuring Robot Koch)	Nkanyuza	Robot Koch	3:01
4.	"OKAY, FINE" (featuring ZULO & Solo Ntsizwa Ka Mthimkhulu)	Nkanyuza, Langa	ByLwansta; Jaedon Daniel	3:34
Total length:				14:57

Chapter Three
No.	Title	Writer(s)	Producer(s)	Length
1.	"PRETTY STARS"	Nkanyuza • Alenzo Molefe • Elizabeth Grant • Marshall Mathers	Al da 3rd	03:07
2.	"WHITEBOARDS" (featuring Thato Feels)	Nkanyuza • Thato Maduna • Siviwe Nkanyuza	ByLwansta	03:55
3.	"ESTBLSHD"	Nkanyuza • Nkanyuza	Kimosabe	03:00
4.	"ASMR" (featuring Alisha Rosa, Some.Unique.Individual and Rāms)	Nkanyuza • Robyn Alisha Peacock • Phemelo Moipolai • Katlego Tau	ByLwansta	04:21

Notes:

- "STAY NAKED" features additional vocals from Sanele Balintaba
- "IT'S LATE" contains an interpolation of "Trouble Sleeping" by Corinne Bailey-Rae
- "KICKSTAND" contains an interpolation of "(You Make Me Feel Like) A Natural Woman" by Aretha Franklin
- "THE HOMIE" feature additional vocals by Kimosabe
- "OKAY, FINE" contains an interpolation of "STAY NAKED" by ByLwansta

Sample Credits:

- "STAY NAKED" contains a dialogue from Episode 9: "My Two Favorite People" from Adventure Time
