= Your Absolutely Right =

EP by ByLwansta
- Released: 11 August 2016
- Recorded: 2015–2016
- Studio: Durban North, ByLwansta's home studio
- Genre: Hip hop
- Length: 32:35
- Label: Independent
- Producer: ByLwansta, Swiff D, Yondo, LonzTooStoned, Champ TIle, BeatMochini, Jrobb, Slater

ByLwansta chronology
NORMVL (2014)	Your Absolutely Right (2016)	SPIJØNGET (2019)

Your Absolutely Right EP is an EP by South African hip hop artist, ByLwansta.

== Background ==
ByLwansta "announced" the title prematurely via his Facebook, in April.

The project is described by ByLwansta as ...":ByLwansta finds himself faced/tasked with the duties of a young adult, which require very mature decisions such as identifying with right and wrong. More specifically, ByLwansta identifies and challenges the idea of conforming, particularly in music, to a specific and popular format and formula for a successful music career.

He finds himself often challenging what has been considered a "working formula" for how to get "into the game" by neglecting the popular style and known formula for such, in favour of one that isn't very style specific, but rather what he wants and only what he wants to do.

ByLwansta tackles the mood at hand using a style he's very popularly known for, in an aggressive and brutally honest manner, a style he established himself with on earlier works such 2014's "NORMVL" Mixtape.

Although having grown in years, listeners are still met by a very introspective and a bit selfish ByLwansta who raps what is on his mind and heart, always."

Your Absolutely Right EP follows the SA Hip Hop Award '14 nominated, NORMVL Mixtape, with 2 years in-between each independent release.

In December 2016, South African hip hop producer, Beatmochini released a remix EP with ByLwansta titled Your Absolutely Fuckin' Right EP: The Remixes.

== Critical reception ==
Your Absolutely Right EP received acclaim and reviews from a handful of South African music blogs, such as Between 10 and 5, Slikour On Life, The African Hip Hop Blog, Hype Magazine and Durban is Yours, and landed on Okay Africa's The 15 Best South African Hip-Hop Albums of 2016, as well as Texx And The City's Top 20 Albums & EPs Of 2016.

== Track listing ==
No.	Title	Writer(s)	Producer(s)	Length
1.	"Your Absolutely Right (Skit)"	Lwandile Nkanyuza	ByLwansta	1:49
2.	"NORMVL Still"	Nkanyuza	Swiff D	3:51
3.	"Funny How" (featuring Saida)	Nkanyuza	ByLwansta, *Avei, *Phinda Fikain	5:10
4.	"Indian Ocean [Interlude]"	Nkanyuza	JRobb, Slater	3:06
5.	"Grey" (featuring Kimosabe)	Nkanyuza – Siviwe Nkanyuza	Yondo	4:30
6.	"Stay At Home!" (featuring Sipho The Gift)	Nkanyuza – Sipho Languza	LonzTooStoned	4:41
7.	"The Sigh"	Nkanyuza	Champ Tile	2:48
8.	"The Routine"	Nkanyuza	BeatMochini	2:08
9.	"Something to Say" (featuring Clara-T)	Nkanyuza – Clara Tshepi Moloi	ByLwansta	4:27
Total length:				32:35

== Personnel ==
- Jonty "TreFlips" Hurd – artwork
- ByLwansta – typeface, recording, arrangement
- Champ Tile – mixing, mastering
