= Winston Wilkinson =

Winston Wilkinson may refer to:

- Winston Wilkinson (government official)
- Winston Wilkinson (badminton)
