= Jane Manning James =

19th-century African-American Mormon pioneer

Jane Elizabeth Manning James
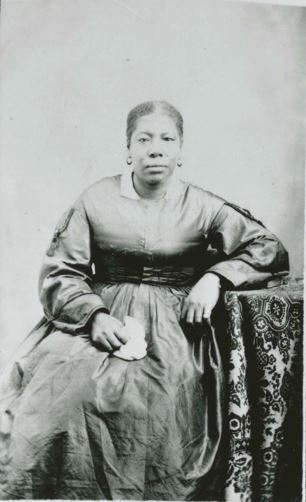

Personal details
- Born: 1822; Wilton, Connecticut, United States
- Died: April 16, 1908 (aged 94); Salt Lake City, Utah, US
- Resting place: Salt Lake City Cemetery; 40.777°N 111.858°W
- Spouse(s): Isaac James (m. 1845; div. 1870); Frank Perkins (m. 1874; div. 1876)
- Children: 8
- Parents: Isaac Manning; Eliza Mead

Jane Elizabeth Manning James (1822 – April 16, 1908), fondly known as "Aunt Jane", was an early African-American member of the Church of Jesus Christ of Latter-day Saints (LDS Church) and traveled to Utah as a pioneer. She lived with Joseph Smith and his family for a time in Nauvoo, Illinois. She traveled with her family to Utah, spending the winter of 1846–1847 at Winter Quarters, and was among the first of the pioneers to enter the Salt Lake Valley in 1847. As a black woman, Jane was not allowed to enter the temple during her lifetime and petitioned the church's First Presidency multiple times to be endowed and sealed. As a result of her requests, she was adopted as a servant into the family of Joseph Smith through a specially-created temple ceremony. She was posthumously endowed by proxy in the Salt Lake Temple in 1979.

== Early life in Connecticut ==
Jane Elizabeth Manning James was born in Wilton, Connecticut, to Isaac Manning and Eliza Phyllis Mead. Although late in Jane's life her brother, Isaac, stated that she had been born in 1813, there are source discrepancies that place her birthday anywhere from September 22, 1812, to the year 1820 or 1822 (the latter being asserted on her gravestone). The Mannings were a free family living in rural Connecticut, and Jane had at least five siblings including Isaac, Lewis, Peter, Sarah, and Angeline. At the age of six, Jane was sent to New Canaan to live with Joseph and Hannah Fitch, a wealthy white family. She was raised by the Fitch's daughter and lived with them for the next thirty years. Little is known about Jane's life with the Fitches other than she worked as a servant: cooking, cleaning, and ironing, etc. While with the Fitches, Jane was also brought up as a Christian, and she was baptized into the Presbyterian Church at about 14 years old. On March 1, 1835, Jane gave birth to a son, Sylvester, whose father is unknown.

== Conversion and relocation to Nauvoo ==
In the fall of 1842, two Latter Day Saint missionaries, including Charles Wandell, were preaching in the area. Jane was forbidden by her Presbyterian preacher to listen to the missionaries, but recorded later that she "had a desire to hear them. I went on a Sunday and was fully convinced that it was the true Gospel." Jane was baptized into the Latter Day Saint church the following Sunday, and acquainted many friends and family members with her new beliefs as well. A year later, Jane and eight other members of her family—her mother, three brothers, two sisters, and a brother and sister-in-law—decided to sell their home in Wilton and move to Nauvoo, Illinois, in order to live among other members of their new faith. The James family began their journey with other recently converted Latter Day Saints, under the direction of Wandell, and traveled from Fairfield, Connecticut, to New York City, then on to Albany and Buffalo. In Buffalo, the James family was separated from the rest of the group; there is dispute as to whether the split took place because James and her family could not afford to pay the fare from Buffalo to Ohio, or if the black Saints were denied passage due to their race. Wandell made arrangements to transport their luggage while James and her family traveled the remainder of their journey (approximately 800 miles) on foot, arriving in Nauvoo in late fall of 1843. James later recalled that the group "walked until our shoes were worn out, and our feet became sore and cracked open and bled until you could see the whole print of our feet with blood on the ground."

=== Living with the Smith family ===
When James and her family arrived in Nauvoo, they were welcomed by Joseph Smith himself. Over the next year, her mother and siblings established their own homes nearby, while James continued to live with the Smith family and worked as a domestic servant in the Mansion House until Smith was killed in 1844.

James recorded that Emma (Joseph's wife) or Lucy (Joseph's mother) would often stop her and talk with her as she went about doing the washing and cleaning in the house. On one occasion, James was in Lucy's room and was allowed to handle the Urim and Thummim, the tools used by Joseph to translate the Book of Mormon. Lucy then said to her, "You will live long after I am dead and gone and you can tell the Latter Day Saints that you was permitted to handle the Urim and Thummim".

On another occasion, Emma asked James if she would like to be adopted by and sealed to her and Joseph in the Nauvoo Temple as their spiritual child. James said nothing at the time, and Emma encouraged her to think about it. Emma asked James again two weeks later, at which time she said "no ma'am". James would say later that she did not understand what the question meant at the time, or she would have taken the couple up on their offer.

After Joseph Smith was killed in 1844, James resided in the home of Brigham Young. It was there where she met and married her husband, Isaac James, a fellow employee of the Young family. Isaac was born a free man and grew up in rural New Jersey; at the time of his baptism he was 19 years old, and was one of the earliest immigrants to Nauvoo.

== Journey west and life in Utah ==
When the Latter Day Saints began to migrate west in 1846, James prepared to move as well. Although many of her immediate family members had joined the church, James and her husband were the only ones who chose to move West with the main body of church members from Nauvoo. At the time of the family's departure, James was pregnant with a second son, Silas James, who was born in Iowa in June 1846. James, with her husband and oldest son, Sylvester, were part of the original group of Latter Day Saints to spend the winter of 1846–1847 at Winter Quarters, Nebraska. They were also part of an early Mormon pioneer company to enter the Salt Lake Valley in September 1847. At the time of their settlement in the Salt Lake Valley, the James family made up a third of the black population in Utah, and were the only ones who were free.

The James family lived just north of Temple Square in Salt Lake City on a lot owned by Brigham Young, who employed both Isaac and Jane through the mid-1850s. In May 1848, James gave birth to her daughter, Mary Ann, who was the first black child born in Utah. The family's first years in the valley were difficult: they lived in poverty and often lacked the bare essentials for survival. Despite hardships, James displayed a commitment to serve and help others. In 1849, James' neighbor Eliza Partridge Lyman had sent her husband, Amasa, on a mission to California and was left with no food to sustain her and her children until the harvest. Lyman records that "Jane James, the colored woman, let me have two pounds of flour, it being half of what she had."

By the mid 1860s, the family were able to build a comfortable home in the southwest corner of Salt Lake City and had acquired both farmland and animals, including an ox, horses, and a small flock of sheep. By the end of 1865, the family, while not wealthy, were fairly prosperous. The family was growing quickly as well, and between 1848 and 1860 five children were born: Miriam, Ellen Madora, Jessie Jeroboam, Isaac, and Vilate. The oldest son, Sylvester, was listed as a member of the Nauvoo Legion in Utah in 1861.

Jane and her husband divorced in 1870, and upon Isaac's departure from Utah shortly after, Jane was given custody of their children and of most of the couple's property and assets. Within four years of the divorce James was married to Sylvester's father-in-law, widower Frank Perkins. Perkins and his first wife, Esther, had originally been brought to Utah as slaves by Reuben Perkins, an early Mormon settler, and his family. James' relationship with Perkins lasted less than two years, the couple divorced in 1876, after which time she reverted to her former married name. Throughout the next few decades, James struggled to care for the remaining children at home as a single parent. She sold the family farm in 1872 and moved closer to the city in order to save money. During these years James both managed a household of children and small grandchildren, and also worked as a domestic servant in order to make ends meet. In addition, she made the family's soap, clothing, and raised vegetables in a small garden. Half of her children had predeceased her by 1875, and two of her grandchildren had died as well. After a twenty-year absence, James' first husband, Isaac, returned to Utah very ill, and lived with Jane until his death in 1891, and though the two never remarried his funeral was held at her home.

James remained active in the LDS Church, and participated extensively in the Relief Society and other of the church's women's organizations. In 1893, James completed her autobiography with the help of fellow church member Elizabeth Roundy. She also contributed financially to the building of the Logan, Manti, and St. George temples. In her later life, both she and her brother. Isaac J. Manning. received reserved seats near the front and center of the Salt Lake Tabernacle for church services. James remained a strong supporter of Joseph Smith throughout her life, calling him "the finest man I ever saw on earth."

Jane Elizabeth Manning James died April 16, 1908, in Salt Lake City. LDS Church president Joseph F. Smith spoke at her funeral, where he declared that she would receive all her temple blessings in the eternities and become a "white and beautiful person," reflecting the church' theology on race at the time. According to The Deseret News, her funeral was attended by many.

== Petitions to be endowed and sealed ==
Over the course of her life, James made at least five petitions to various church leaders to enter the temple and receive her endowment, an important ordinance for members of the LDS Church. She also made petitions to be sealed, along with her children, to Walker Lewis, a prominent African-American church elder. Lewis, like Elijah Abel, had been ordained to the priesthood during Joseph Smith's lifetime, and James therefore assumed that he would be eligible for temple ordinances. However, her petitions were consistently ignored or refused.

=== Sealing as a servant in the Smith family ===
James continued to ask that she and her family be given the ordinance of adoption so that they could be sealed together forever. Her justification for asking to be the exception to the church's rule was Emma Smith's offer in 1844 to have her sealed to the Smith family as a child. Referring back to Smith's original offer, James made a request to apostle John Taylor in 1884 to be sealed to the Smith family, which was later denied. In December 1884, James was given a limited-use temple recommend, which allowed her to enter the temple to participate in baptisms by proxy. The First Presidency later "decided she might be adopted into the family of Joseph Smith as a servant, which was done, a special ceremony having been prepared for the purpose." The ceremony took place on May 18, 1894, with Joseph F. Smith acting as proxy for Joseph Smith, and Bathsheba W. Smith acting as proxy for James (who was not allowed into the temple for the ordinance). In the ceremony, James was "attached as a Servitor for eternity to the prophet Josep[h] Smith and in this capacity [...] connected with his family[, to] be obedient to him in all things in the Lord as a faithful Servitor."

James was dissatisfied with that unique sealing ordinance, and applied again to obtain the sealing that was offered to her by Emma. According to the diary of Franklin Richards, the church's First Presidency met on August 22, 1895, to consider her appeal, which was again denied. James made her final written petition in August 1903 to then-church president Joseph F. Smith, asking him to allow her to "finish the work I have begun for my dead." She continued to have trials: all but two of her eight children (Sylvester and Ellen) preceded her in death, as did 6 of her 14 grandchildren.

=== Posthumous endowment ===
In 1979, nearly 72 years after her death, James was endowed by proxy by a group of black and white Latter-day Saints in the Salt Lake Temple.

== Legacy ==
A 20-minute documentary based on James's life, Jane Manning James: Your Sister in the Gospel, premiered in 2005, and has been shown at This Is The Place Heritage Park in Salt Lake City, at the 2005 annual conference of the Foundation for Apologetic Information & Research (FAIR), and on public television (PBS). The film was directed by Margaret Blair Young, co-author with Darius Gray of the Standing on the Promises trilogy of historical fiction that draws on the facts of James's life.

James was commemorated in the 1997 Days of '47 Parade in Salt Lake City on a float sponsored by the Genesis Group (an official organization began under LDS Church president Joseph Fielding Smith to support Latter-day Saints of African descent).

In June 1999, a monument to James's life was dedicated near her grave in the Salt Lake City Cemetery also by the Genesis Group, along with the Missouri Mormon Frontier Foundation. The original headstones of Jane and Isaac James were supplemented with a granite monument faced with two bronze plaques. One side of the monument commemorates an incident documented in 1850, in which Jane shared half of her flour supply with by Mormon pioneer Eliza Partridge Lyman, who wrote:

April 13: Brother Lyman [Eliza's husband] started on a mission to California with O. P Rockwell and others. May the Lord bless and prosper them and return them in safety. He left us ... without anything to make bread, it not being in his power to get any. April 25: Jane James, a colored woman, let me have two pounds of flour, it being about half she had.

A second bronze plaque, containing quotations from James and significant dates and events from her life, was placed on the back of the monument. In April 2005, the graves and monument were again cleaned and sealed.

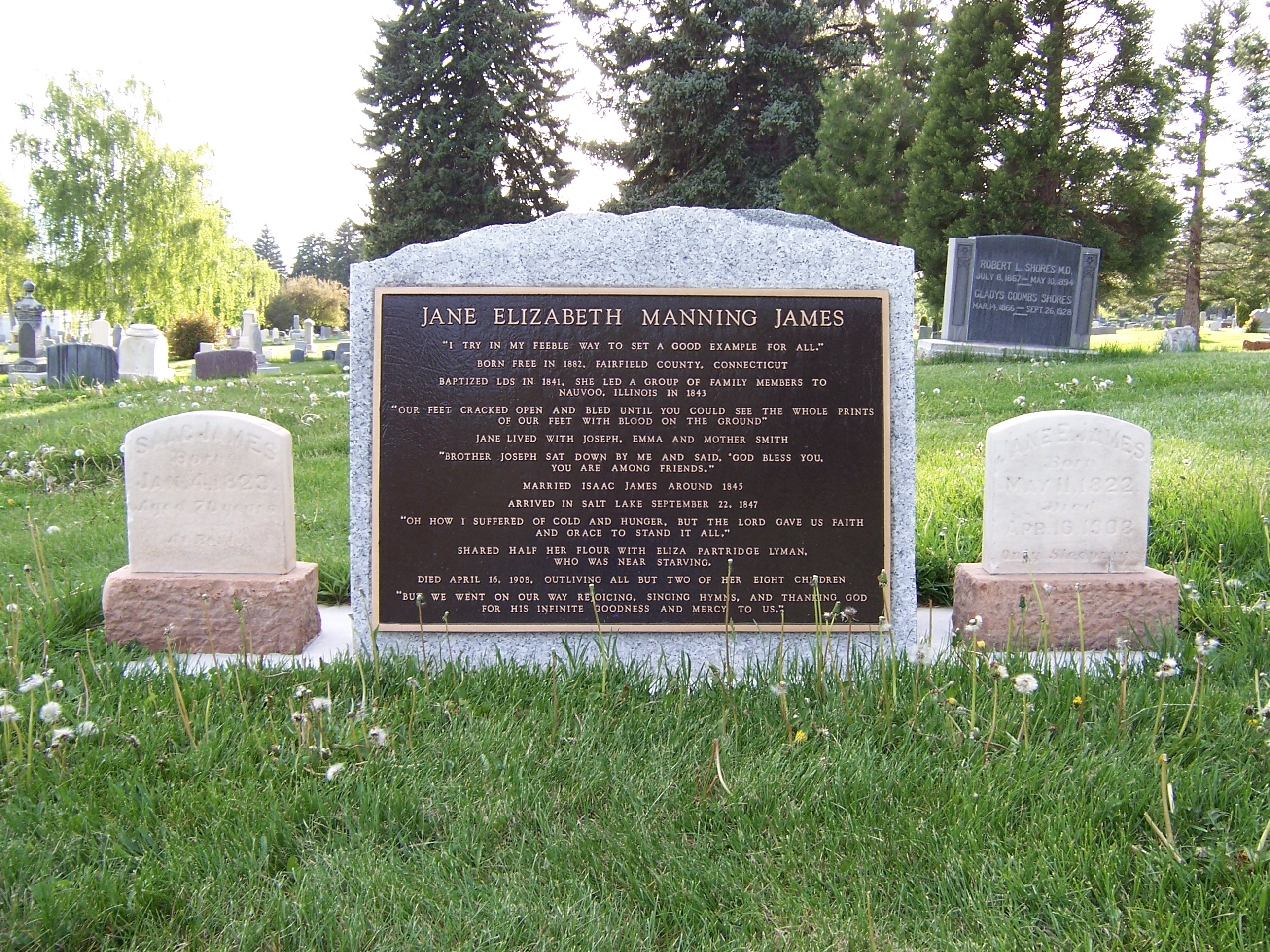
Front side

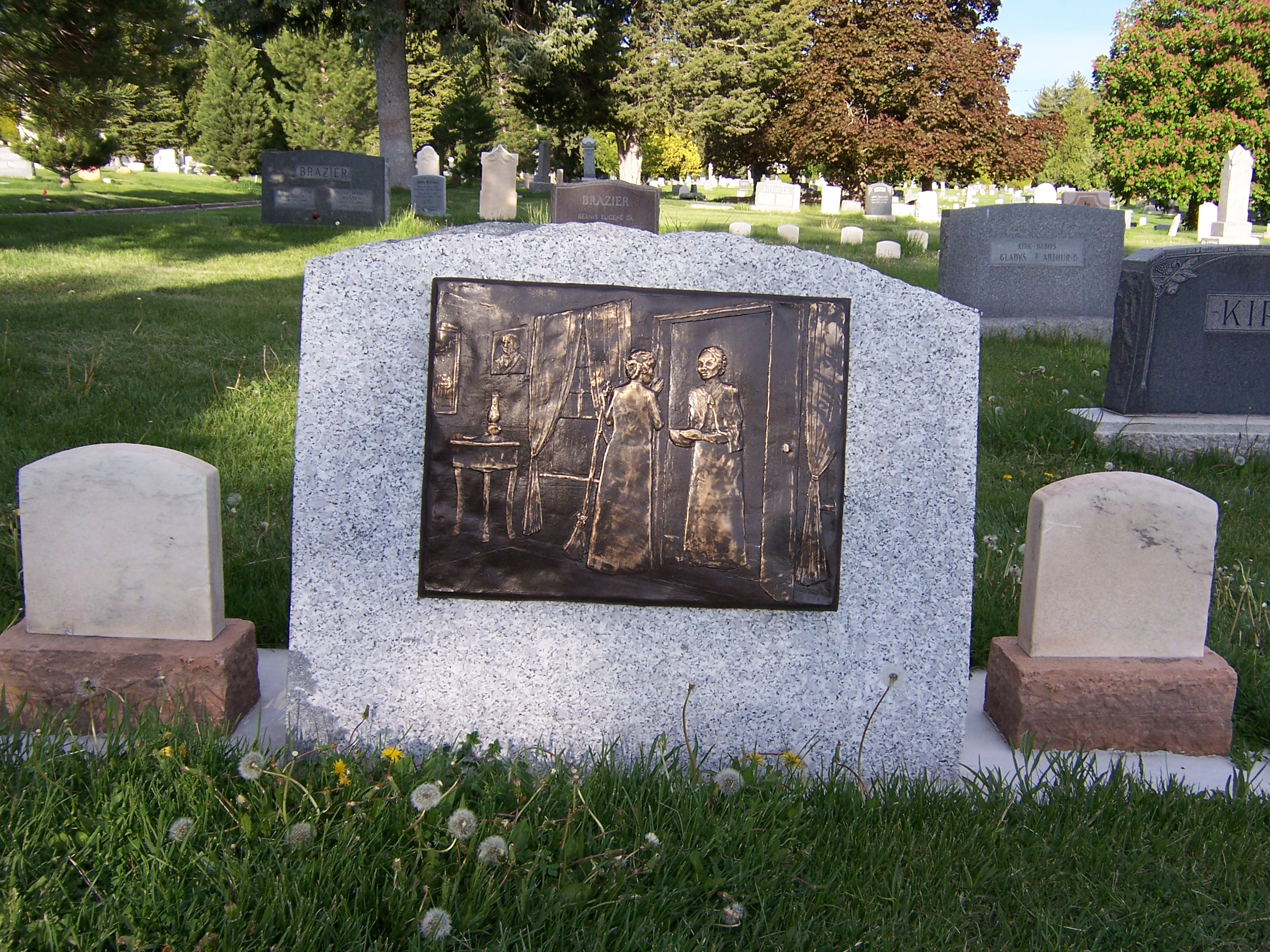
Back side

Jane Manning's grave marker

On October 12, 2018, a feature-length film was released about James's relationship with Emma Smith, entitled Jane and Emma. The film was directed by Chantelle Squires, with a screenplay by Melissa Leilani Larson and starred Danielle Deadwyler.

== Sources ==
- Turley, Richard E. (2014). Women of Faith in the Latter Days. Vol. 2. Brittany Chapman Nash. Salt Lake City, Utah: Deseret Book Company. pp. 120–135. ISBN 978-1609071738. OCLC 751248881.
- Carter, Kate B. The Story of the Negro Pioneer. Harold B. Lee Library; Provo, Utah: Utah Printing. pp. 11–13.
- Coleman, Ronald Gerald (1980). A History of Blacks in Utah, 1825–1910 (Doctor of Philosophy thesis). Salt Lake City: University of Utah. ProQuest 303080722.
- Wolfinger, Henry J. "A Test of Faith: Jane Elizabeth Manning James and the Origins of the Utah Black Community" (1893) [textual record]. A Test of Faith: Jane Elizabeth Manning James and the Origins of the Utah Black Community, Series: MSS SC 1069, pp. 2–3. Provo, Utah: L. Tom Perry Special Collections, Harold B. Lee Library, Brigham Young University.
- Roundy, Elizabeth J.D. "Document 9: Life Sketch of Jane James" (1893) [textual record]. A Test of Faith: Jane Elizabeth Manning James and the Origins of the Utah Black Community, Series: MSS SC 1069, p. 4. Provo, Utah: L. Tom Perry Special Collections, Harold B. Lee Library, Brigham Young University.
- Mueller, Max Perry (2017). Race and the Making of the Mormon People. University of North Carolina Press. ISBN 978-1-469-63376-3 – via Google Books.
- Barrett, Ivan J. (2000). Heroic Mormon Women. American Fork, Utah: Covenant Communications. p. 99. ISBN 978-1577346760.
- Young, Margaret Blair (2005). "The Making of Jane Manning James: Your Sister in the Gospel". Segullah.org. Archived from the original on July 18, 2015.
