= Margaret Blair Young =

American novelist

Margaret Blair Young (born 1955) is an American author, filmmaker, and writing instructor who taught for thirty years at Brigham Young University.

== Biography ==
Young's published work includes the novels House Without Walls (1991), Salvador (1992), and Heresies of Nature (2002) and the short story collections Elegies and Love Songs (1992) (which won an Association of Mormon Letters award) and Love Chains (1997). Focusing on the novel Salvador, literary and cultural critic Terryl Givens calls Young "one of the most mature and lyrical voices in Mormon writing." She also co-authored a trilogy of historical novels about Black Mormon pioneers titled Standing on the Promises with Darius Gray. The trilogy, published between 2000 and 2003, was republished in revised and expanded form in 2012 and 2013.

Young scripted and helped direct a 2005 television documentary based on the life of Jane Elizabeth Manning James, "Jane Manning James: Your Sister in the Gospel." The 20-minute documentary has been shown at This Is The Place Heritage Park in Salt Lake City, Utah, the 2005 annual conference of the Foundation for Apologetic Information & Research (FAIR), and on public television (PBS). Documentary filmmaker Scott Freebairn produced and directed the film. Later, Young served as the project director for the Utah chapter of the Afro-American Historical and Genealogical Society's film The Wisdom of our Years.

In 2008, Young and Gray completed a long documentary titled Nobody Knows: The Untold Story of Black Mormons, which has been shown on PBS stations, in film festivals, and on the Documentary Channel. Her award-winning play, I Am Jane, also about Black Mormon pioneer Jane Manning James, has been produced throughout the country. Young has also authored encyclopedia articles on Blacks in the western United States, and has served as president of the Association for Mormon Letters. In 2014 she received a Lifetime Achievement Award from the Whitney Awards and the Smith-Pettit Foundation Award for Outstanding Contribution to Mormon Letters.

Beginning in 2014, Young began work in the Democratic Republic of the Congo with the aim of launching the film industry, which disappeared amidst the chaos of war and corruption in the 1990s. She has teamed up with Tshoper Kabambi, Deborah Basa, and Ephraim Faith on film initiatives. Their work has resulted in two feature films, co-written by Young and Kabambi and directed by Kabambi: Heart of Africa (2020) and Heart of Africa 2: Companions (2021), the first feature films produced in the DR-Congo by a Congolese film team to be released in theaters in the United States.

In 2017, Young founded a 501c3 humanitarian organization, Congo Rising, to support film initiatives as well as health and educational projects. In Lodja, DR-Congo, she works with Professor Abbé On'Okundji Okavu Ekanga, author of Les Entrailles du Porc-épic: Une nouvelle éthique pour l’Afrique. Mr. Okundji returned to his home village in the Congo to help it recover from the Congo War of 1998-2004.

Young is married to English professor Bruce Wilson Young (born 1950). Bruce is a BYU, Columbia, and Harvard graduate who has written multiple essays and the book Family Life in the Age of Shakespeare. Along with Margaret, he helps direct Congo Rising and helped produce Heart of Africa and Heart of Africa 2. Margaret and Bruce are the parents of four children, including vocal performer and music instructor Kaila Lifferth and writer Robbie Blair.

== See also ==
- LDS fiction

== Sources ==
- Margaret Blair Young at the MLCA Database
