= Mark L. Grover =

Mark Leroy Grover (born 1947) is an American expert on Mormonism in Brazil and an author on religion in Latin America.

== Biography ==
Grover was born in Malad, Idaho and is a member of the Church of Jesus Christ of Latter-day Saints (LDS Church). He served as a Mormon missionary in Brazil. He has a Ph.D. in Brazilian History from Indiana University.

Grover works as the subject area librarian for Latin America at the Harold B. Lee Library at Brigham Young University.

== Writings ==
Grover is the author of several books related to the LDS Church and Brazil and at times focusing more broadly on Latin America and religion in general. He has compiled multiple bibliographies related to the LDS Church in Latin America and Mexican-Americans in Utah.

=== Books ===
- Dahlin, Therrin C.; Gary P. Gillum; Mark L. Grover (1981). The Catholic Left in Latin America: A Comprehensive Bibliography. Boston, Massachusetts: G. K. Hall. ISBN 0-8161-8396-1.
- Martins, Helvécio; Grover, Mark L. (1994). The Autobiography of Elder Helvécio Martins. Salt Lake City, Utah: Aspen Books. ISBN 1-56236-218-6.
- Grover, Mark L., ed. (1999). Religion and Latin America in the Twenty-First Century: Libraries Reacting to Social Change. 42nd Annual Meeting of the Seminar on the Acquisition of Latin American Library Materials. Austin: SALALM Secretariat, Benson Latin American Collection, The General Libraries, University of Texas at Austin. ISBN 0-917617-59-2.
- Grover, Mark L. (2008). A Land of Promise and Prophecy: Elder A. Theodore Tuttle in South America, 1960-1965. Provo, Utah: Religious Studies Center, Brigham Young University. ISBN 978-0-8425-2713-2.

=== Articles ===
- Grover, Mark L. (Autumn 1984). "Religious Accommodation in the Land of Racial Democracy: Mormon Priesthood and Black Brazilians". Dialogue: A Journal of Mormon Thought. 17 (3): 23–34. doi:10.2307/45227936. JSTOR 45227936. S2CID 254394476. Archived from the original on 2011-06-14.
- Grover, Mark L. (1989). "The Mormon Church and German Immigrants in Southern Brazil: Religion and Language". Jahrbuch für Geschichte von Staat, Wirtschaft und Gesellschaft Lateinamerikas. 26: 295–308.
- Grover, Mark L. (Spring 1990). "The Mormon Priesthood Revelation and the São Paulo, Brazil Temple". Dialogue: A Journal of Mormon Thought. 23 (1): 39–53. doi:10.2307/45225842. JSTOR 45225842. S2CID 254321222. Archived from the original on 2011-06-14.
- Grover, Mark L. (Winter 1994). "Relief Society and Church Welfare: The Brazilian Experience". Dialogue: A Journal of Mormon Thought. 27 (4): 29–38. doi:10.2307/45228038. JSTOR 45228038. S2CID 254402744. Archived from the original on 2011-06-14.
- Grover, Mark L. (Fall 1996). "Execution in Mexico: The Death of Rafael Monroy and Vicente Morales". BYU Studies. 35 (3): 6–28.
- Grover, Mark L. (1997). "Milton and Irene Soares: Mormon Pioneers of Northeastern Brazil". In Bruce A. Van Orden; et al. (eds.). Pioneers in Every Land: Inspirational Stories of International Pioneers Past and Present. Salt Lake City, Utah: Bookcraft. ISBN 1-57008-306-1.
- Palmer, A. Delbert; Grover, Mark L. (1999). "Hoping to Establish a Presence: Parley P. Pratt's 1851 Mission to Chile". BYU Studies. 38 (4): 115–138.
- Grover, Mark L. (2000). "The Miracle of the Rose and the Oak in Latin America". Out of Obscurity: The Church in the Twentieth Century. Sydney B. Sperry Symposium. Salt Lake City, Utah: Deseret Book. pp. 138–150. ISBN 1-57345-842-2.
- Grover, Mark L. (Summer 2005). "The Maturing of the Oak: The Dynamics of LDS Growth in Latin America". Dialogue: A Journal of Mormon Thought. 38 (2): 79–104. doi:10.2307/45227402. JSTOR 45227402. S2CID 254399820. Archived from the original on 2011-06-14.

=== Other ===
- Grover, Mark L. (1977). The Mormon Church in Latin America: A Periodical Index (1830-1976). Provo, Utah: Harold B. Lee Library, Brigham Young University.
- Grover, Mark L. (1985). Mormonism in Brazil: Religion and Dependency in Latin America (Ph.D. thesis). Department of History, Indiana University.
- Grover, Mark L. (2002). "One Convert at a Time" (Speech given August 7, 2001). Brigham Young University 2001-2002 Speeches. Provo, Utah: BYU Publications & Graphics. pp. 79–87.
- Grover, Mark L. (2002). "The LDS Church in Latin America: A Bibliography". Provo, Utah: Harold B. Lee Library, Brigham Young University. Archived from the original on 2010-04-04.

== Sources ==
- Dustjacket bio connected with autobiography of Elder Helvécio Martins
- blog entry by Holzapfel about Grover's book
