= Helvécio Martins =

Mormon leader (1930–2005)

- Martins in 1990

Second Quorum of the Seventy
- 31 March 1990 – 30 September 1995
- Called by: Ezra Taft Benson
- End reason: Honorably released

Personal details
- Born: 27 July 1930; Rio de Janeiro, Brazil
- Died: 14 May 2005 (aged 74); Santo André, São Paulo, Brazil
- Alma mater: Rio de Janeiro State University
- Spouse(s): Rudá Tourinho de Assis
- Children: 4

Helvécio Martins (27 July 1930 – 14 May 2005) was the first person of Black African descent to be called as a general authority of the Church of Jesus Christ of Latter-day Saints (LDS Church).

== Early life and education ==
Born to Honório and Benedita Martins in Rio de Janeiro, Brazil, Helvécio Martins grew up there in a middle-class environment in the outskirts of what was then Brazil's capital. Due to the federal policies of Getúlio Vargas, Honório's profession as a fur trader was jeopardized, causing Helvécio to drop out of school when he was twelve years old to help generate more income for his parents and six younger siblings. Nevertheless, Helvécio continued to attend school whenever he could, eventually graduating from high school at twenty-six years old. Education became highly important to him, especially as he saw how hard his father had to work because of his lack of education. As such, Martins chose to continue his studies at Rio de Janeiro State University, earning a bachelor's degree in economics in 1962. Originally, Martins wanted to study education, but since all the education courses were offered in the daytime when he had to work, he turned to accounting and business management courses.

== Introduction to the LDS Church ==
In 1972, Martins had returned late from work and was preparing to sleep when there was a knock on the door. Initially, the Martins family was wary about answering the door so late at night, but his wife, Rudá, decided to open it. Standing outside were two missionaries of the LDS Church. Martins was intrigued, having been curious about these men and their purpose just days earlier. To these missionaries from the United States, Helvécio's first question was: "Are you racist?" For the next four and a half hours, Helvécio and Rudá discussed the church with the missionaries, some of its doctrine, and how people of African descent were treated within the organization; the missionaries stayed until one in the morning.

On 2 June 1972, Helvécio, Rudá, and their oldest son, Marcus, were baptized into the LDS Church. This occurred despite their knowledge that the Church did not then allow members of Black African descent to hold the priesthood or to receive temple ordinances. In later life reflections, the Martins family noted that there were difficulties in being black members of the LDS Church. Many of the acquaintances of the Martins family expected them to leave, mocking and criticizing their new faith. With relatively few Black members in the LDS Church in Brazil at the time, some church members also withheld their support for the Martins family and others because of their race. Nevertheless, the Martins family opted to stay rooted in the faith and testimonies they had developed by continuing to remain active in the LDS Church. To help integrate them into their ward, their bishop called Helvécio to be a Gospel Doctrine class teacher and Rudá as a counselor in the Primary presidency.

== Priesthood ban removal and further church service ==
On 9 June 1978, Martins and his family heard of the announcement that the LDS Church was lifting the priesthood ban. After Martins received the priesthood and his temple ordinances, he served in the church as a bishop, counselor in the stake presidency, and as president of the Brazil Fortaleza Mission. In April 1990, church president Ezra Taft Benson called Martins as a member of the Second Quorum of the Seventy. Martins became the first black general authority in the LDS Church and the first black Seventy since Elijah Abel. About his call to the Second Quorum of the Seventy, Martins was quoted as saying, "I felt very inadequate, but the Lord qualifies whom He calls."

As a general authority, Martins spoke twice in general conference: once in October 1990 with his talk "The Value of a Testimony" and again in April 1995 with a talk titled "Watchmen on the Tower."

After serving a standard five-year term as a member of the Second Quorum of the Seventy, Martins was released as a general authority on 30 September 1995.

== Personal life ==
Helvécio Martins married Rudá Tourinho de Assis on 8 December 1956, when he was twenty-six years old. Together they had four children: Marcus, Mariza, Raphael, and Aline. As an adult and provider for his young family, Martins worked as an assistant professor at Rio de Janeiro State University, as a financial management controller for Petrobras, and as a financial director for Liderbras – a subsidiary company of Petrobras. His son, Marcus, later served as the chair of the religion department at Brigham Young University–Hawaii.

Before converting to the LDS Church, the Martins family practiced Catholicism, while also participating in activities related to Macumba, a Brazilian folk religion with roots in Afro-Brazilian slavery.

With Mark Grover, Martins dictated his life story, which was published in 1994 as The Autobiography of Elder Helvecio Martins.

On 14 May 2005, Martins died at 74 years old in Santo André, São Paulo, Brazil, due to heart problems. Following his death, Elder Neil L. Andersen said, "Elder Helvécio Martins was a living example of Alma 13:3: 'called and prepared from the foundation of the world according to the foreknowledge of God.' Within five days of meeting the missionaries in 1972, Brother Martins was at the Church, helping and cleaning, serving in whatever way he could. Once he believed something was right, he had a steel determination to hold firm and never let go."

== See also ==
- Joseph W. Sitati
