= Frederick Mostert =

Frederick Mostert is Past President of the International Trademark Association, currently the President of the Luxury Law Alliance, Of Counsel at Bird & Bird, London and an internationally recognized authority on intellectual property issues. Mostert served as Chief Intellectual Property Counsel and Chief Legal Counsel of luxury group Richemont, which includes Cartier, Van Cleef and Arpels, Alfred Dunhill, and Chloé. He was inducted into the Intellectual Property Hall of Fame in 2015, which honours those who have helped to establish intellectual property as one of the key business assets of the 21st century.

He is a Professor of Practice at the Dickson Poon School of Law, King's College, London, and a Research Fellow at the Oxford Intellectual Property Research Centre, University of Oxford. He is the recipient of a King's College Teaching Excellence Award as well as an Education Award for 'Expanding Opportunities'. Mostert is a founder of the Digital Scholarship Institute and the Digital Communities Lab (London). He is a co-developer of the international Unicode "Troll" emoji.

Mostert has served on Compagnie Financiere Richemont SA's Board, as well as the boards of Net-a-Porter, the International Trademark Association, The Walpole Group, and others.

At present he serves on the board of the Royal Academy of Culinary Arts, the Adopt a School Trust, is a member of Classics for All and Chatham House, the Royal Institute of International Affairs.

== Writing ==
Mostert is principal author and editor of Famous and Well-known Marks – An International Analysis which has been cited by US Federal Courts, the High Courts in the UK, the Supreme Court in Canada, the Constitutional Court in South Africa and in various other jurisdictions, as well as by other scholarly publications. He has also authored From Edison to iPod – Protect Your Ideas and Profit and International Trademark Treaties and Agreements. Mostert's opinion pieces have been featured in the Financial Times and the South China Morning Post. International news organizations call upon Mostert for expert commentary on intellectual property matters.

== Education and career ==
Mostert was educated at Columbia University School of Law in New York City and the University of Johannesburg. He is a member of the New York Bar and a solicitor of England and Wales. He has practised corporate law at Shearman and Sterling and international intellectual property law at Fross, Zelnick, Lehrman & Zissu in New York.

== Pro bono ==
Some of Mostert's most notable pro bono legal assistance has been provided to President Nelson Mandela (South Africa), and the Shaolin Monks (China).

== Awards ==
Mostert was inducted into the Intellectual Property Hall of Fame in 2015, which honours those who have helped to establish intellectual property as one of the key business assets of the 21st century. He received a Teaching Excellence Award from King's College for 2017/18.

He was awarded a Life Achievement Award by the Global Legal Post, a Lifetime Achievement Award by the World Trademark Review, the Paul A. Welter Award for Excellence in Trademarks and the World Leaders IP Award for the Best IP Achievement undertaken on a Pro-Bono Basis and Best Achievement in IP Management.

== Board service ==
Mostert has served on Compagnie Financiere Richemont SA's Board, as well as the boards of Net-a-Porter, The International Trademark Association, The Walpole Group, and others. At present he serves on the board of the Royal Academy of Culinary Arts, the Adopt a School Trust, and is a member of Classics for All and Chatham House, the Royal Institute of International Affairs.

In addition, he has served on advisory boards including the Industry Advisory Commission of the World Intellectual Property Organization (UN Agency, Geneva), the advisory board of the European Union Intellectual Property Office (Brussels), the McCarthy Institute for Intellectual Property (San Francisco), the Art and Science Foundation (New York), and Freedom under Law.

At present he also serves on the editorial board of the Oxford University Press's Journal of Intellectual Property Law and Practice, the advisory panel of the Intellectual Property Magazine and has served on the editorial board of The Trademark Reporter.

== Personal ==
Mostert lives in London and is married to the novelist, Natasha Mostert.
