= Julia Mavimbela =

Julia Nompi Mavimbela (20 December 1917 – 16 July 2000) was a schoolteacher and community leader in South Africa. When public schools were closed because of the 1976 Soweto uprising, Mavimbela taught schoolchildren in Soweto how to garden and how to read. Mavimbela later co-founded Women for Peace, an organization for women of all races to work for democracy in South Africa. In 1981 she joined the Church of Jesus Christ of Latter-day Saints (LDS Church) and served in local church leadership.

== Education and marriage ==
Mavimbela was chief monitor in college, where she oversaw the care of 300 girls. After obtaining her teaching certificate, she studied for two years, specializing in kindergarten teaching. At a school in Boxburg, she became the first woman principal. After Mavimbela's mother died, she married John Mavimbela, one of the founders of the Black Chamber of Commerce in Soweto, and helped her husband run a butcher shop in Eastern Native Township. On June 9, 1955, John was killed while driving home from work when his car was hit by an oncoming vehicle, leaving her widowed with her several children. The police blamed John for the accident, even though the head-on collision occurred on his side of the road, because they said that Blacks were careless drivers.

== Career ==
In the late 1980s Mavimbela was working as a school teacher at a Catholic School in South Africa. In the late 1970s Mavimbela had worked as a social worker.

== Community leadership ==
=== Community gardening ===
After the Soweto uprising in 1976, public schools were closed for two years. Mavimbela gathered local school children and taught them how to read while creating community gardens with them. The group was called "Junior Gumboots" after the black boots that miners wear. When gardening with the students in Soweto, Mavimbela told them, "Let us dig the soil of bitterness, throw in a seed, show love, and see what fruits will grow. Love will not come without forgiving others. Where there was a bloodstain, a beautiful flower must grow."

=== Women for Peace ===
Mavimbela co-founded Women for Peace, a group for all races that aimed to have a peaceful transition to true democracy in South Africa. From 1984–1986, Mavimbela was co-president with Denise Valente. Women for Peace supported initiatives important to women. The group asked storekeepers to indicate that powdered milk products should not be fed to infants and asked that school teachers be paid more money. Women for Peace also petitioned for making common-law marriages easier to obtain and for the Matrimonial Property Act, which allows a widow to have her deceased husband's property instead of the eldest son. They also petitioned for integrated playgrounds and prison reform.

Mavimbela was a vice president of the group National Women of South Africa, and president of the Transvaal Region of the National Council of African Women.

== Membership in LDS Church ==
Mavimbela joined the Church of Jesus Christ of Latter-day Saints (LDS Church) in 1981. She has since served as a Relief Society president and a public affairs director in the church. In 1985 when the Johannesburg South Africa Temple was dedicated Mavimbela was among the first temple workers in it.

In 1989 Mavimbela was a speaker at BYU's women's conference. In 1995, she was honored at Brigham Young University for "outstanding contribution to a profession, a community, a religion." She was featured in the LDS Church video Lives of Service.

In 1991 Mavimbela served as an LDS public affairs missionary for the Africa area with Mary Mostert as her companion. In this position they contacted many leading politicians with information on the US constitution during the time South Africa was formulating the structure of its post-Apartheid government.

== Works ==
- Mavimbela, Julia (1990). "I Speak from My Heart: The Story of A Black South African Woman". In Cornwall, Marie; Howe, Susan (eds.). In Women of Wisdom and Knowledge. Salt Lake City: Deseret Book. pp. 61–72. ISBN 0-87579-310-X. OCLC 20828527.

== See also ==
- Black Mormons
- Black people and Mormonism

== See also ==
- Clark, Andrew (Winter 1994), "The Fading Curse of Cain: Mormonism in South Africa" (PDF), Dialogue: A Journal of Mormon Thought, 27 (4): 41–56
- Garr, Arnold K. et al. Encyclopedia of Latter-day Saint History. (Salt Lake City: Deseret Book, 2000), p. 721-722 ISBN 978-1-57345-822-1 OCLC 44634356
