= Amanda and Samuel Chambers =

Early followers of Mormonism

Samuel Chambers and Amanda Leggroan
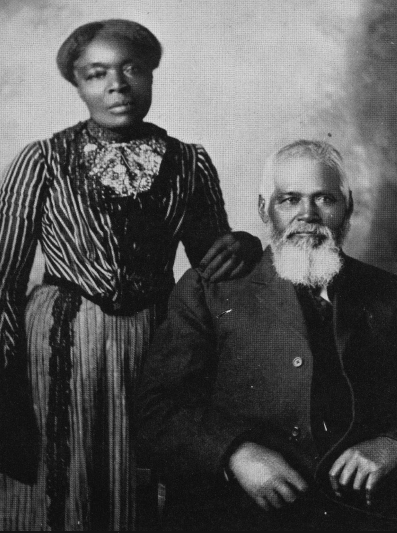

Personal details
- Born: January 1, 1840 (Amanda); May 21, 1831 (Samuel)
- Died: November 7, 1929 (aged 98) (Samuel); March 10, 1929 (aged 89) (Amanda); Salt Lake City, Utah, US

Amanda Leggroan (January 1, 1840 - March 10, 1929) and Samuel Chambers (May 21, 1831 - November 7, 1929) were early members of the Church of Jesus Christ of Latter-day Saints in Utah and former enslaved persons. The Chambers relocated to Utah where they owned a very successful farm and were prominent members in their community.

== Amanda Leggroan ==
Leggroan was born in Noxubee County, Mississippi on January 1, 1840, to Green and Hattie Leggroan. She had two siblings, Green Jr., and Edward. Their family was enslaved to David Leggroan of Mississippi. On May 4, 1858, she married Samuel Chambers, and they were freed together after the American Civil War.

== Samuel Chambers ==
Chambers was born in Pickens County, Alabama on May 21, 1831, to James Davidson, and his slave, Hester Gillespie. Chambers first came in contact with missionaries of the Church of Jesus Christ of Latter-day Saints when he was enslaved in Mississippi. The missionaries noticed that most of the people in Mississippi were not interested in talking to them, but an enslaved boy expressed a surprising amount of interest. He was secretly baptized and confirmed a member of the Church at the age of 13 by Thomas Preston, a recent convert to the church. Chambers later explained that after becoming a member of the Church, he "greatly longed" to be near other members of the Church, but since he was enslaved, he "could never see how it would be brought about."

In 1850, he married Priscilla Beasley, with whom he had one child, named Peter. Beasley passed away a few years later. In 1858, he married Amanda. After the Civil War, Chambers began sharecropping and shoemaking for a living. Chambers had almost no contact with the Church of Jesus Christ of Latter-day Saints for nearly twenty-five years after his baptism.

== Life in Utah ==
In 1870, Samuel and Amanda migrated to Utah with her brother Edward and his wife, along with Samuel's teenaged son, Peter. The cost of the journey had required them to save their money for four years. To make the long trip, they used an ox-drawn wagon. They arrived in Salt Lake City on April 27, 1870. When they arrived, Utah was home to only 118 African Americans. During this time, Black members of the Church were prohibited from being ordained to the Priesthood. The Chambers quickly became involved with the activities of the Eighth ward, Samuel receiving a calling as an assistant deacon, and Amanda becoming a Relief society "deaconess". They were also assigned custodial duties and the helped care for the buildings of the church. They became very successful in fruit and berry cultivation. In 1875, Amanda was baptized into the church, after living in Utah for 5 years. Both Samuel and Amanda received their patriarchal blessings on September 5, 1874, from patriarch John Smith. The Chambers were known for being very active in the Church, despite racial discrimination.

In 1875, Samuel and Amanda purchased land in Millcreek and started a very successful farm. They were considered to be essential farmers and were one of the first farming families in Utah. Chicken, pork, eggs, peas, wheat, corn, cabbage, molasses, and butter came from their farm. Samuel was illiterate for his whole life, but Amanda taught herself to read and write by using a Guffey speller.

Amanda and Samuel did not have any children together. Amanda died on March 10, 1929, at the age of 85, and Samuel passed several months later, on November 7, 1929. Their funerals were very well attended by members of the Church and friends in Utah. They are both buried in Elysian Burial Gardens in Millcreek.

They were posthumously sealed together and to their parents in the Jordan River Utah Temple, on April 20, 1984.

== Recent news ==
In July 2020, a street in Millcreek, Utah was named "Chambers Avenue" after Amanda Samuel. Millcreek Mayor Jeff Silvenstrini said,

"For over half a century, they were stalwart settlers in this area and well respected in the community. These pioneers are well deserving of a place of honor in the heart of our new City Center."

Representatives from the NAACP, the Afro-American Historical and Genealogical Society, and descendants of relatives Amanda and Samuel spoke at the ceremony.
