= Mary Mostert =

- Born: February 9, 1929; Arkansas
- Died: July 1, 2016 (aged 87); Provo, Utah
- Spouse: H. P. Grooms (divorced 1975)
- Children: 6

Mary Mostert (February 9, 1929 – July 1, 2016) was a political writer and activist. She was a member of the Church of Jesus Christ of Latter-day Saints (LDS Church) and served as a missionary for the church in Johannesburg, South Africa. She unsuccessfully ran for the New York State Senate in 1972. After her unsuccessful campaign, she became a campaign manager and worked with many different politicians. She wrote a number of articles for several different newspapers and was the author of several books. Mostert was also involved in many political and social groups.

== Early life ==
Mary Mostert was born in 1929 in Arkansas to J. F. T. Mostert and Lucy Kurtz Stallings. Her father was from South Africa and attended college in Kansas. Her parents got divorced and her mother worked. She grew up Unitarian. During her lifetime she attended 14 different schools, and due to ill health, did not attend school for a period of two and a half years. During high school she worked in a grocery store, using her extra money to pay for music lessons.

At age 13, she was living in Memphis, Tennessee. She wondered why the city was segregated. She became interested in the Declaration of Independence and what rights were prescribed there, and memorized the entire declaration. Mostert always had an interest in politics. She organized an interracial youth group in Memphis in the 1940s. She also conducted street surveys in Memphis asking people if they could recognize a quote from the Declaration of Independence. Many people thought it was from the Communist Manifesto.

At age 16, she attended the University of Missouri. In 1947, at age 17, she married H. P. Grooms. They had six children together, but divorced in 1975.

Mostert attended the University of Missouri in 1945. She later attended Southwestern University in 1950. In 1985, she returned to school at the American River College.

== Career ==
=== Writer ===
Mostert wrote for The Nation magazine from 1948 to 1963, reporting on politics. In 1952, she wrote for The Negro Digest and wrote a column for the Times-Union in Rochester, New York, from 1965 to 1969, called "Mary Quite Contrary". In the 1970s, she was a columnist for Valley Pioneer. From 1986 to 1991, she wrote for the Mountain Democrat.

=== Politician ===
Mostert began her political career as a Democrat, and was a member of the Democratic Party from 1950 to 1970. She worked for President Lyndon Johnson's War on Poverty programs, however by the end of the decade she had come to believe that the War on Poverty was harming the families it was intended to help, leading her to leave the Democratic Party. Also in the 1960s, she was the national leader of the Mothers' Lobby. In 1962, as the director of the Independent Political Forum, she met with hundreds of women from across the world in Geneva to petition delegates at the 17th National Disarmament Conference in support of the first Nuclear Test-ban Treaty. In 1965, she became the executive secretary for the organization. In the 1960s she was also one of the first female political commentators published in a major newspaper in New York.

Mostert ran for the New York State Senate in 1972 as a Republican candidate, but lost the election. She then became a campaign manager and aided campaigns for candidates in New York and California. After losing the election, she moved to California. she was the El Dorado County campaign manager for Norm Shumway in 1978. She was appointed as the Republican State Committeewoman by Shumway, a position she held for 12 years.

Mostert involved with Positive Action NOW!, a group of South African women who tried to reduce the threat of civil war between South Africa's different racial, religious and political groups through promoting use of "the language of peace, rather than the language of war", from 1961 to 1963. She was secretary of the group from 1991 to 1992. In this position, she was able to meet and work with prominent political leaders in South Africa, including then-President F. W. de Klerk, future President Nelson Mandela, Inkatha Freedom Party chairman Frank Mdlalose, trade union leader Cyril Ramaphosa and Conservative Party leader Andries Treurnicht. In 1992, she also attended a meeting of Evangelical Church leaders in KwaZulu-Natal

=== Other contributions ===
Mostert also ran a construction company that won architectural awards for restoring historic buildings. She was the owner of Grooms Housing in Rochester, New York, from 1963 to 1969. She later managed Mostert Construction in Placerville, California, from 1976 to 1991.

From 1994 to 2001, Mostert edited Michael Reagan's radio talk show newsletter and the Reagan Monitor. She also created the Reagan Information Interchange.

== Church service ==
Mostert met three Mormon missionaries in 1947 when traveling on a boat to South Africa. She did not convert to the LDS Church, however, until 1974. She served as a missionary for the LDS Church in 1991 to Johannesburg, South Africa. She served as the Public Affairs director for the church in Africa. Her mission included the 44 nations in sub-Saharan Africa. She served with Julia Mavimbela, who knew Nelson Mandela. The two of them put together information on the United States Constitution and distributed it to South African women. They also delivered a packet to Mandela.

== Publications ==
- Coming Home: Families Can Stop the Unraveling of America (1996)
- Banner of Liberty: A Hunger for Liberty Leads to the Declaration of Independence (2004)
- Banner of Liberty: We hold These Truths to Be Self-Evident, That All Men Are Created Equal (2004)
- Banner of Liberty: The Threat of Anarchy Leads to the Constitution of the United States (2005)
