= Genesis Group =

Auxiliary organization of the LDS church

- Formation: June 8, 1971; 53 years ago
- Founders: Thomas Monson, Gordon B. Hinckley, Boyd K. Packer, Ruffin Bridgeforth, Eugene Orr, Darius Gray
- Founded at: Salt Lake City, Utah
- Leader: Davis Stovall
- Parent organization: The Church of Jesus Christ of Latter-day Saints

The Genesis Group is an auxiliary organization of the Church of Jesus Christ of Latter-day Saints (LDS church) for African-American members and their families.

== History ==
LDS Church leaders Thomas Monson, Gordon B. Hinckley, and Boyd K. Packer established the Genesis Group with Ruffin Bridgeforth, Eugene Orr, and Darius Gray on October 19, 1971 in Salt Lake City, Utah. It was first organized to provide members an organization where they could affiliate with fellow African-American members.

The Genesis group provided meetings for Black members of the LDS church; specifically, Relief Society, Primary, Young Men, Young Women and testimony meetings. Members of Genesis were still expected to attend Sunday meetings in their home wards, which at the time were sacrament meeting, Priesthood meetings, and Sunday School. It was like a branch, a small group of members, but without priesthood authority. The group was led by Ruffin Bridgeforth from 1971 through 1978. Shortly after the church's June 8, 1978, announcement of the revelation extending the priesthood to all worthy male members of the church, the group's attendance dropped, and officially discontinued in 1987. Participation decreased in part because it added additional time commitments to already demanding LDS church membership. In 1985, Marva Collins started a "Genesis II" group in Oakland, California, and published a newsletter focused on news about Black Mormons until 1988.

The Genesis Group was reorganized in 1996, based on a perception that African Americans still had unique issues and could benefit from a chance to affiliate with one another. Leaders of the group include Darius Gray (1997–2003), Don Harwell (2003–2018), and Davis Stovall (2018-present). Stake and High Councilmen were assigned to represent The Genesis Group in local organization, and a General authority was assigned to be a liaison to the group.

Other Genesis groups have existed in Washington, D.C. In 2007, similar support groups existed in Hattiesburg, Mississippi, Cincinnati and Columbus, Ohio, Los Angeles, and Houston. The Genesis Group meets on the first Sunday of every month in Salt Lake City.

== See also ==
- 1978 Revelation on Priesthood
- Black Mormons
- Black people and early Mormonism
- Black people and Mormonism
