= Nicol Mostert =

South African rugby union player

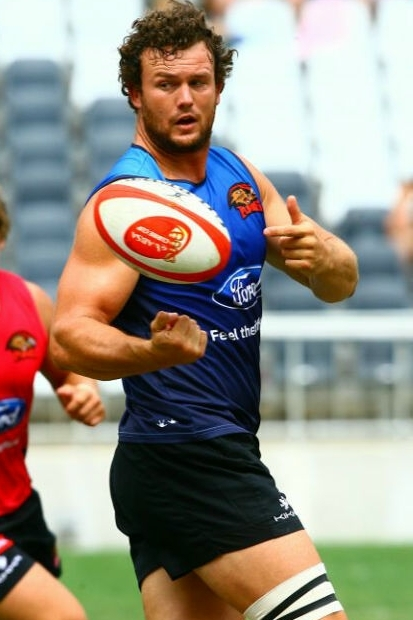
- Nicol Mostert
- Born: Johannes Nicolas Mostert; 5 February 1985 (age 41) Roodepoort, South Africa
- Height: 1.94 m (6 ft 4 1/2 in)
- Weight: 107 kg (16 st 12 lb)
- School: Waterkloof High

Rugby union career
- Position: Flanker / Eighthman
Provincial / State sides
Years	Team	Apps	(Points)
2008–present	Pumas	24	(0)
- Correct as of 14 October 2012

Nicol Mostert (born 5 February 1985) is a South African rugby union footballer. He plays either as a flanker or eighthman. He represents the Pumas in the Currie Cup and Vodacom Cup.
