= Natasha Mostert =

South African author and screenwriter

- Born: Johannesburg
- Occupation: Novelist
- Writing career
- Period: 2000s
- Subject: Contemporary fantasy
- Website: www.natashamostert.com

Natasha Mostert is a South African author and screenwriter presently living in London.

== Personal ==
Born in Johannesburg South Africa, Mostert grew up in both Johannesburg and Pretoria. She now lives in the United Kingdom, in Chelsea, west London although she still owns a house in Stellenbosch in her native South Africa. Mostert trains as a kickboxer and is raising money for CPAU, an Afghan charity that teaches women how to box and feel empowered in their lives.

== Education and career ==
Mostert was educated in South Africa, and then Columbia University, New York.

As a political op-ed writer, she has written for the New York Times, Newsweek, The Independent and The Times.

She also worked as a teacher at the University of the Witwatersrand, Johannesburg and at the WNET television station in New York City before taking up writing.

She runs two online games on her website: The Keeper game, which is in the form of a personality quiz and which is used to support her book, Keeper of Light and Dust and The Season of the Witch Memory Game, which ties into her award-winning novel of the same name.

== Writing ==
To date, she has published six novels. She specialises in contemporary fantasy psychological thrillers with paranormal and mystic themes. Her first novel, The Midnight Side, both a murder mystery and ghost story, was released in 2000. It was followed by The Other Side of Silence (2001), a thriller about music and computer gaming, and Windwalker (2005), a Gothic love story about murder, redemption and reincarnation. Her fourth book, Season of the Witch (2007) deals with remote viewing, memory palaces and witchcraft. Season of the Witch won the Book to Talk About: World Book Day Award 2009 with the £5,000 prize being donated to CPAU, an Afghan charity. Her fifth novel is Keeper of Light and Dust (published as The Keeper in the UK) and deals with chi, mysticism, martial arts and quantum physics. She returned to the subject of memory and identity in her latest novel, Dark Prayer. Kirkus Reviews describes it as a "brainy, fast-moving thriller" in which Mostert “brings together fascinating strands of biology, psychology and mysticism.”

In recent years, Mostert has branched out into screenwriting.

== Awards ==
- Season of the Witch, winner, Book to Talk About: World Book Day Award 2009

== Bibliography ==
- The Midnight Side (2000)
- The Other Side of Silence (2001)
- Windwalker (2004)
- Season of the Witch (2007)
- Keeper of Light and Dust (2009)
- Dark Prayer (2014)
