= Darius Gray =

American historian

- Born: Colorado Springs, Colorado
- Education: University of Utah
- Occupations: Journalist, Writer
- Known for: Genesis Group

Darius Gray is an African-American Latter-day Saint speaker and writer.

Gray was born in Colorado Springs, Colorado. He joined the Church of Jesus Christ of Latter-day Saints (LDS Church) in 1964. He attended Brigham Young University for one year and then transferred to the University of Utah. Gray worked for a time as a journalist.

== LDS Church service ==
Gray was a counselor in the presidency of the LDS Church's Genesis Group when it was formed in 1971. He was president of the group from 1997 to 2003. Gray was also the co-director (with Marie Taylor) of the Freedmens Bank Records project for the church's Family History Department. He is a speaker on African-American genealogy, blacks in the Bible and blacks in the LDS Church. He had also written a trilogy of historical novels ("Standing on the Promises") with Margaret Blair Young, and co-produced/directed a documentary with Young as well: "Nobody Knows: The Untold Story of Black Mormons." Utah's NAACP honored him with its Martin Luther King Jr. award in 2008, and the Iota Iota chapter of Omega Psi Phi fraternity honored him as "Citizen of the Year" in 2011.

Gray has traveled throughout the United States to make presentations. In 2007, he appeared in the PBS documentary The Mormons. In February 2008, he made an invitation-only presentation at the Charles H. Wright Museum of African American History in Detroit that was partly sponsored by New Detroit. He is also featured in the BYU Television series Questions and Ancestors. Gray has also served as a developer of the website blacklds.org and on the advisory board of Reach the Children, a humanitarian organization designed to help people in Africa.

Gray was among those involved in Developing the "Race and the Priesthood" essay published on the website of The Church of Jesus Christ of Latter-day Saints in December 2013. In 2014 Gray was given a special citation by the Mormon History Association for contributions to Mormon history.

== See also ==
- Lloyd, R. Scott (June 14, 2003), "1978 revelation celebrated with song", Church News
- Lloyd, R. Scott (February 20, 2010), "It's the stories that make for good history", Church News
- Openshaw, Barbara; Hallen, Kathy; Gilliland, Judy; Glover, Lillian (March 29, 2008), "Life is a circle: Church co-sponsors family history event in Los Angeles", Church News
