= Edward Dube =

Zimbabwean religious leader (born 1962)

Presidency of the Seventy
- August 1, 2024 – present
- Called by: Russell M. Nelson

First Quorum of the Seventy
- 6 April 2013 – present
- Called by: Thomas S. Monson

Personal details
- Born: Edward Dube; 12 May 1962 (age 64); Chirumanzu, Zimbabwe
- Spouse(s): Naume Keresiya Salizani
- Children: Four

Edward Dube (born 12 May 1962) is a Zimbabwean religious leader who has been a general authority of the Church of Jesus Christ of Latter-day Saints (LDS Church) since April 2013. He is the first Zimbabwean and the second black African to be a general authority.

Dube was born in Chirumanzu, Zimbabwe, then known as Southern Rhodesia to Clement Dube and his wife, Rosemary. Dube was first introduced to the LDS Church when his employer, Leaster Heath, who he worked for as a servant, gave him a copy of the Book of Mormon. Dube first attended an LDS Church meeting in the Kwekwe Branch in February 1984, where he initially felt uncomfortable, feeling as if he was "in a servant relationship with most of the members of the branch". That quickly changed as he and branch members were able to share feelings about the Book of Mormon. He was baptized in August 1984.

Dube has a diploma in education from the Zimbabwe D. E. College and studied entrepreneurship at the University of South Africa. Dube then worked for the Church Educational System, eventually serving as a country director for Zimbabwe and in other administrative positions. He also oversaw the expansion of seminaries and institutes into Zambia and Malawi.

== LDS Church service ==
Dube served as a full-time missionary for the church from 1986 to 1988. He initially served in the church's South Africa Johannesburg Mission, which at the time included Zimbabwe, and then in the newly created Zimbabwe Harare Mission when the mission was split in 1987.

Dube has served in the LDS Church as a branch president, district president and counselor in a mission presidency. In 1999, Dube became president of the first stake organized in Zimbabwe. From 2009 until 2012, he served as president of the Zimbabwe Harare Mission. He was made an area seventy in 2012 and served for a year prior to becoming a member of the First Quorum of the Seventy on 6 April 2013. Dube was the first Zimbabwean to serve as a mission president.

In August 2013, Dube began serving as second counselor in the presidency of the church's Africa West Area, taking up residence in Ghana and assisting in overseeing Church operations in that country and several other west African nations. In October 2013, Dube spoke in general conference. In his talk Look Ahead and Believe he reminded Latter-day Saints that "In the sight of the Lord, it is not so much what we have done or where we have been but much more where we are willing to go." A few years later he was assigned to church headquarters and moved his residence to Utah. Among these assignments was overseeing the Be One celebration of the 40th anniversary of the revelation extending the priesthood to all worthy males, along with Joseph W. Sitati and Claudio R. M. Costa.

In August 2018, Dube became first counselor in the presidency of the Africa West Area, thus returning his residence to Ghana. In November 2018, he participated in the groundbreaking of the Abidjan Ivory Coast Temple. In August 2020, Dube became a counselor in the presidency of the Africa South Area taking up residency in South Africa, to assist in overseeing church operations in that country as well as about ten other countries, including his native Zimbabwe. He later served as the area president. Effective August 1, 2024, he returned to Church headquarters to begin a new assignment in the Presidency of the Seventy. He is the first black African native to serve in that Presidency.

== Personal life ==
Among those he taught as a missionary was the family of Naume Keresia Salazini, although she was later baptized by her brother who had previously joined the LDS Church. After his mission, Dube renewed his acquaintance with Salazini and they were married in 1989 in Kwekwe, Zimbabwe. They were sealed in the Johannesburg South Africa Temple in 1992. They are the parents of four children.
