= Winston Wilkinson (government official) =

American politician

Winston Wilkinson (born 1944) is a Republican politician. He served as head of the Office of Civil Rights at the U.S. Department of Health and Human Services under Michael Leavitt. He is an African American and member of the Church of Jesus Christ of Latter-day Saints (LDS Church).

== Biography ==
Wilkinson was raised in Cedar Heights, Maryland, an African-American community. He joined the United States Navy after graduating from high school. He later attended Morgan State University, where he met and married his wife, Gloria. He then went to Howard University Law School. Wilkinson was raised as a Methodist. He later became a Muslim. In the early 1970s he became involved with Republican activities in Maryland. He was introduced to the LDS Church by V. Dallas Merrell, who would later be a member of the Second Quorum of the Seventy, at a Republican meeting in 1981. Wilkinson and his wife joined the LDS Church in 1981.

During the 1980s Wilkinson served as special assistant to Secretary of Education Terrel Bell and then as deputy secretary in the Office of Civil Rights in the George H. W. Bush administration. He ran a cleaning company in the mid-1990s and then moved to Utah where he worked in the human resource department of the LDS Church. He was later elected to the Salt Lake County Council where he served for one term. In 2002 he made an unsuccessful campaign for the Republican nomination for the Utah Second congressional district.

He later led the HHS Office of Civil Rights during the George W. Bush administration. During his tenure, the office was criticized for lax enforcement of new patient privacy laws. Under his direction the office launched a website to disseminate information about the privacy law.

After leaving the HHS position, Wilkinson ran again for the Salt Lake County Council. He was in a primary against Richard Snelgrove, who later won the seat.

== Sources ==
- "Winston Wilkinson". Ldsgenesisgroup.org.
- "Utah Local News - Salt Lake City News, Sports, Archive". The Salt Lake Tribune. 2010-06-16.
