= African lily =

African lily is a common name for several plants and may refer to:

- Agapanthus africanus, native of the Cape of Good Hope in South Africa.
- Agapanthus praecox, also native to the Cape of Good Hope, and Natal Province in South Africa.
Plants named African lily
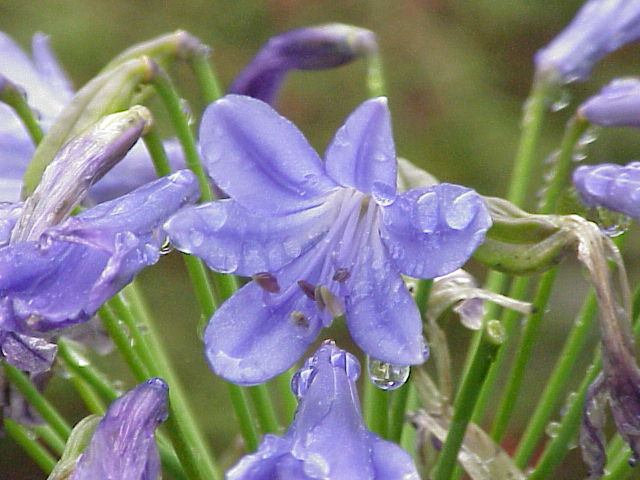
Agapanthus africanus

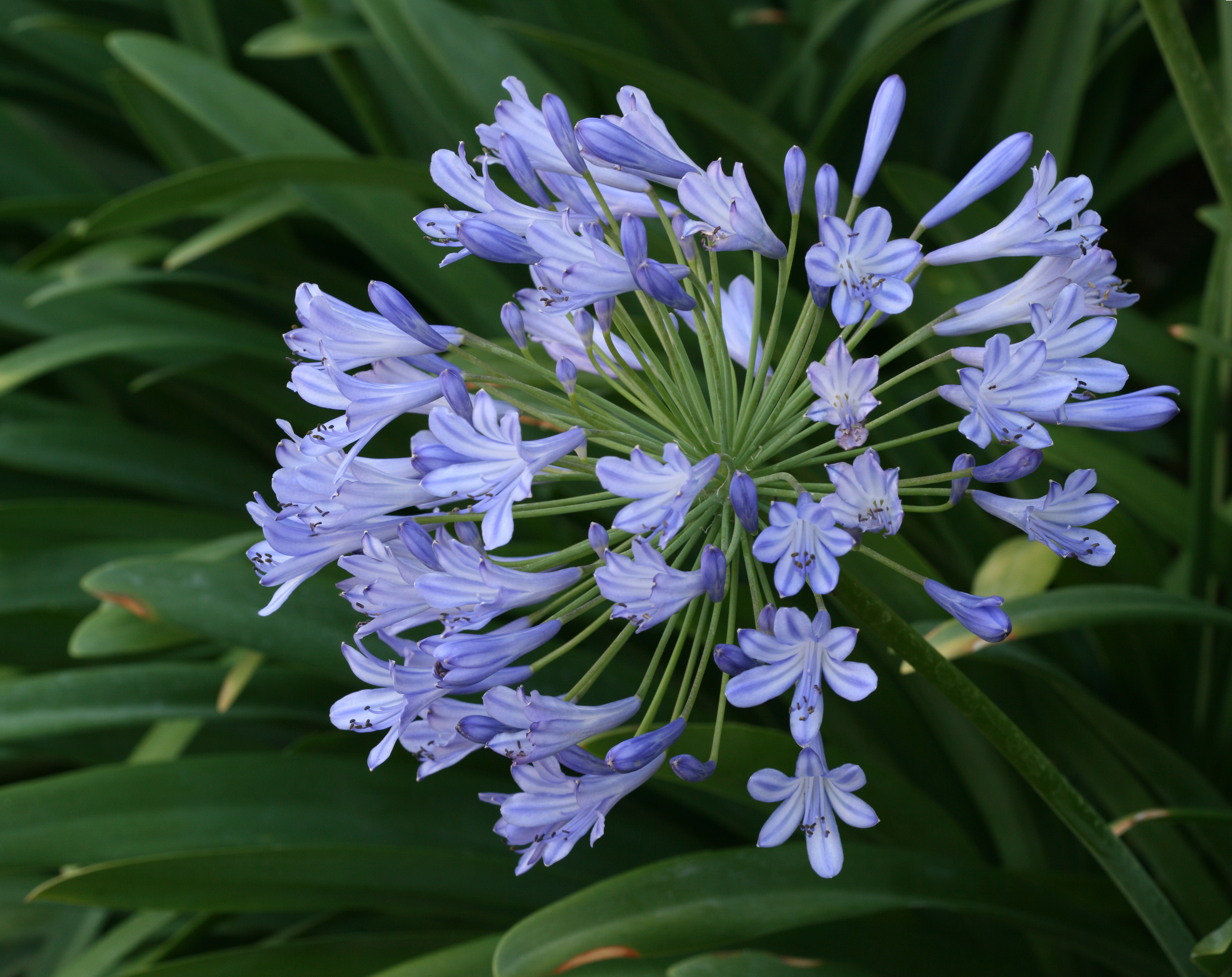
Agapanthus praecox
