= ByLwansta =

South African rapper, record producer, art director and graphic designer (born 1995)

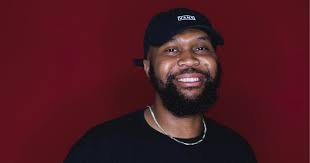
- ByLwansta in 2022

Background information
- Also known as: Lwansta, Please Say The By
- Born: Lwandile Nkanyuza; 30 June 1995 (age 31); Kokstad, Kwa-Zulu Natal, South Africa
- Genres: Hip hop
- Occupations: Rapper, record producer, creative director, graphic designer
- Instruments: Vocals, keyboards
- Years active: 2008–present
- Label: NORMVL Sound
- Website: http://normvlizm.co.za

Lwandile Nkanyuza (born 30 June 1995), known professionally as ByLwansta, is a South African rapper, singer, songwriter, graphic designer, creative director, author and cultural entrepreneur. He is the founder and creative director of the multidisciplinary creative studio NORMVL, through which he has released music, published books and developed creative projects spanning design, publishing and live events.

Following the release of his debut mixtape, NORMVL Mixtape (2014), ByLwansta gained wider recognition with the extended play Your Absolutely Right (2016). In 2017, he became the first South African artist to perform on the music platform COLORS, introducing his work to an international audience. He later released the studio albums SPIJØNGET (2022) and THE CHIP IS StALE (2024), the latter receiving critical acclaim for its exploration of identity, vulnerability and creative independence.

Beyond music, Nkanyuza has established several creative initiatives, including the weekly live music platform Your Weekly Touch Up, the South African album-art archive eyewaslistening, and the memoir Really Listening: Song Lyrics That Made Me Feel Seen as a Creative Entrepreneur (2026). His work frequently combines music, graphic design, publishing and community-building, and has been characterised by his philosophy of "creating the things you wish existed".

== Early life ==
Lwandile Nkanyuza was born on 30 June 1995 in Kokstad, KwaZulu-Natal, South Africa. He spent part of his childhood in Kokstad before later relocating to Durban, where he studied Graphic Design, graduating with a Bachelor of Arts degree.

During his studies, Nkanyuza began independently releasing music while developing an academic interest in visual communication and album artwork. His undergraduate research examined the relationship between music and graphic design, themes that would later inform projects including eyewaslistening, his album campaigns and his broader multidisciplinary creative practice.

== Career ==
=== 2014–2015: NORMVL Mixtape ===
Following several independently released mixtapes, Nkanyuza released NORMVL Mixtape in 2014 under the newly established NORMVL imprint. The project marked an early shift toward the multidisciplinary creative practice that would later define his work, combining music, visual design and independent creative direction.

The mixtape received coverage from South African hip hop publications and earned Nkanyuza a nomination for Mixtape of the Year at the 2014 South African Hip Hop Awards. The project also established NORMVL as both a record label and broader creative platform through which Nkanyuza would continue releasing music and developing visual projects.

=== 2016–2018: Your Absolutely Right, Hype Magazine and COLORS ===
Nkanyuza released the extended play Your Absolutely Right in 2016. The project was included in several South African year-end lists, with publications including OkayAfrica and Texx and the City highlighting it among the country's notable hip hop releases of the year.

In February 2017, Nkanyuza was selected as one of seven artists featured in HYPE Magazine's annual Freshman Edition, an issue recognising emerging South African hip hop artists identified as ones to watch.

Later that year, Nkanyuza became the first South African artist to perform on the music platform COLORS, performing his song "Lindiwe". The appearance introduced his work to an international audience and has since been cited as a milestone in his career.

Also in 2017, Nkanyuza participated in the Goethe-Institut's Pop-Kultur Nachwuchs programme in Berlin, collaborating with musicians and creative practitioners from around the world.

=== 2019–2022: SPIJØNGET ===
Between 2019 and 2022, Nkanyuza released SPIJØNGET, a multipart album issued over three chapters before being compiled into a complete studio album. Conceived during a period of creative transition following his move to Johannesburg, the project explored themes of overthinking, personal growth and artistic independence.

Singles including "KICKSTAND" received international attention following their release through the French electronic label Kitsuné Musique.

In 2022, Apple Music named Nkanyuza its South African Up Next artist, recognising the release of SPIJØNGET and his growing contribution to the country's independent music scene.

The project was supported by performances at festivals and international cultural programmes, including Pop-Kultur Berlin and other multidisciplinary showcases.

=== 2025–present: THE CHIP IS StALE and expanded creative practice ===
Following the conclusion of the SPIJØNGET era, Nkanyuza began releasing music from his second studio album, THE CHIP IS StALE, which was issued on 10 May 2024 through NORMVL Sound. Described by Nkanyuza as an exploration of people-pleasing, self-doubt and personal growth, the album drew on his experiences as an independent artist and creative entrepreneur.

Released alongside an extensive visual campaign, THE CHIP IS StALE formed part of a broader multidisciplinary project incorporating photography, graphic design and storytelling. The album's rollout centred on the recurring phrase "Stop Ignoring the Signs", using road signs and automotive imagery as metaphors for recognising emotional and creative warning signs before they become crises.

The campaign drew on Nkanyuza's long-documented relationship with his 2005 Opel Corsa Lite, which had become a recurring motif throughout the album's visual identity and narrative. In May 2024, automotive manufacturer Opel announced a promotional partnership with Nkanyuza in support of the album's rollout, citing the thematic alignment between the campaign and the vehicle that inspired it.

During the same period, Nkanyuza expanded his work beyond music through several long-term creative initiatives. In 2023 he launched Your Weekly Touch Up, a weekly live music platform dedicated to South African alternative music. In 2025 he founded eyewaslistening, an online archive documenting South African album-cover design and the creatives behind it. The following year he published his first book, Really Listening: Song Lyrics That Made Me Feel Seen as a Creative Entrepreneur, a collection of reflective essays examining creativity, entrepreneurship and the relationship between music and personal development.

Commentators have noted that this period marked an expansion of Nkanyuza's practice beyond recording artist into publishing, design, education and cultural programming, with many of his projects reflecting his stated philosophy of "creating the things you wish existed".

== Other ventures ==
=== Your Weekly Touch Up ===
In January 2023, Nkanyuza co-founded Your Weekly Touch Up, a weekly live music residency dedicated to South African alternative music. Held in Johannesburg, the platform combines live performances with public conversations on topics including music business, independent artistry and the creative industries.

The platform was established to create a consistent performance space for emerging and independent artists working outside South Africa's commercial music landscape. Since its launch, Your Weekly Touch Up has featured hundreds of musicians, producers and DJs, becoming a regular meeting point for artists, audiences and creative practitioners.

Writing for SA Creatives, Venus Ndlovu identified Your Weekly Touch Up as one of several "third spaces" contributing to South Africa's contemporary creative culture through community-building and interdisciplinary exchange.

=== NORMVL ===
Nkanyuza is the founder and creative director of NORMVL, an independent creative studio and record label established in 2014. Through NORMVL he has overseen the creative direction of his own music while also producing visual identities, publications, campaigns and creative strategy for musicians, cultural organisations and commercial clients.

Originally conceived as the imprint for Nkanyuza's own releases, NORMVL later expanded into a multidisciplinary practice encompassing music, graphic design, publishing, events and creative consulting.

=== eyewaslistening ===
In 2025, Nkanyuza founded eyewaslistening, a digital archive documenting South African album-cover design and the creative practitioners behind it. Published primarily through Instagram, the project highlights the designers, photographers, illustrators, stylists and musicians responsible for significant South African album artwork.

According to OkayAfrica, the archive grew out of Nkanyuza's longstanding interest in visual communication and music, informed by both his work as a graphic designer and his undergraduate research into the relationship between visual identity and music consumption.

Beyond documenting album artwork, eyewaslistening seeks to preserve the histories surrounding South African music design while recognising the collaborative work that contributes to an album's visual identity.

=== Really Listening ===
Nkanyuza published his first book, Really Listening: Song Lyrics That Made Me Feel Seen as a Creative Entrepreneur, in March 2026 through NORMVL.

Structured as a collection of reflective essays built around influential song lyrics, the book explores themes including creative entrepreneurship, artistic independence, identity and personal development. Rather than analysing the songs themselves, each chapter uses music as a starting point for broader reflections on building a sustainable creative career.

The publication forms part of Nkanyuza's broader multidisciplinary practice, extending themes explored throughout his music into long-form writing and public discussions through the accompanying Really Listening Study Group series.

== Artistry ==
=== Musical style ===
Nkanyuza's music has been described as alternative hip hop, incorporating elements of jazz, neo-soul, electronic music and spoken word. His songwriting frequently explores themes of identity, vulnerability, self-reflection and creative independence, with critics noting his conversational lyricism and emphasis on narrative storytelling.

Across projects including SPIJØNGET and THE CHIP IS StALE, his work has examined subjects such as overthinking, impostor syndrome, people-pleasing and personal growth, often drawing from his experiences as an independent artist and creative entrepreneur.

=== Visual design ===
Alongside his music, Nkanyuza works as a graphic designer and creative director, frequently developing the visual identities accompanying his own releases. His projects often integrate photography, typography, publication design and branding into broader conceptual campaigns, with albums, books and digital platforms forming interconnected bodies of work rather than standalone releases.

This multidisciplinary approach extends to initiatives including eyewaslistening, an archive documenting South African album-cover design, and the publication of Really Listening, reflecting Nkanyuza's longstanding interest in the relationship between music and visual communication.

=== Creative philosophy ===
A recurring theme throughout Nkanyuza's work is the idea of "creating the things you wish existed", a philosophy that has informed his music, publishing, design practice and community initiatives. Rather than treating these disciplines as separate pursuits, his projects frequently combine music, visual communication and public programming to explore broader questions surrounding creativity, entrepreneurship and cultural participation.

== Discography ==
=== Studio albums ===
- SPIJØNGET (2022)
- THE CHIP IS StALE (2024)
- THE CHIP IS StALE (UNPLUGGED) (2025)

=== Instrumental albums ===
- SPIJØNGET (Instrumentals) (2022)

=== Mixtapes ===
- NORMVL Mixtape (2014)

=== Extended plays ===
- Your Absolutely Right (2016)

=== Selected singles ===
- "Lindiwe" (2014)
- "Lindiwe – A COLORS SHOW" (2017)
- "STAY NAKED" (2019)
- "KICKSTAND" (featuring PATFROMTHESLUMS) (2019)
- "THE BIKE SONG" (2020)
- "OKAY, FINE" (featuring Solo Ntsizwa & ZULO) (2020)
- "ASMR" (2021)
- "SALTY" (with ZULO) (2022)
- "OFFICE DAZE" (2024)
- "1 CONVO" (featuring Chipego) (2024)
- "CLUTCH BALANTSI (TIME IT)" (2024)

=== Bibliography ===
- Really Listening: Song Lyrics That Made Me Feel Seen as a Creative Entrepreneur (2026)

== Awards and nominations ==
| Year | Award Ceremony | Prize | Work/Recipient | Result |
|---|---|---|---|---|
| 2013 | Original Material Awards | Newcomer of the Year | Himself | Nominated |
| 2014 | Original Material Awards | Mixtape of the Year | NORMVL | Nominated |
| 2014 | Original Material Awards | Best Sleeve Design | NORMVL | Nominated |
| 2014 | Original Material Awards | Lyricist of the Year | Himself | Nominated |
| 2014 | South African Hip Hop Awards | Mixtape of the Year | NORMVL | Nominated |
