= Joseph W. Sitati =

Kenyan religious leader

First Quorum of the Seventy
- 4 April 2009
- Called by: Thomas S. Monson

Personal details
- Born: Joseph Wafula Sitati; 16 May 1952 (age 74); Bungoma, Kenya

Joseph Wafula Sitati (born 16 May 1952) has been a general authority of the Church of Jesus Christ of Latter-day Saints (LDS Church) since 2009, when he became a member of the First Quorum of the Seventy. He is the church's first black African general authority and the second general authority of black African descent.

== Early years ==
Sitati is a native of Kenya. He has a bachelor's degree in mechanical engineering from the University of Nairobi. He worked in the oil and gas industries (such as Total Oil) as well as for Reach the Children, for which he was also a member of their international board. Immediately prior to his call as a mission president in the LDS Church, Sitati was the church's director of public affairs in Africa.

== LDS Church service ==
Sitati first attended the LDS Church in 1985 and became a member in March 1986. In 1989, he became the church's first district president in Kenya. He and his wife and children were the first Kenyans to go to an LDS Church temple. At that point, the LDS Church was not fully recognized in Kenya, so Sitati organized tight knit groups of nine to meet together in meetings because this was the most allowed by the laws at the time for unrecognized religions.

Sitati also became the first stake president in Kenya when the Nairobi Kenya Stake was organized in 2001. On 3 December 1991, in the Johannesburg South Africa Temple, Sitati and his wife and children became the first Kenyan family to receive the church's sealing ordinance. In 2004, Sitati became an area seventy of the church and in 2007 he became the president of the Nigeria Uyo Mission.

=== General authority ===
Sitati was still a mission president at the time of his call to the First Quorum of the Seventy in April 2009. He served as a counselor in the church's Africa West Area from 2010 to 2013, residing in Ghana but overseeing church operations in seven countries with regular travel to many of them, and with supervisory oversight on any efforts to open and operate the church in another roughly seven west African countries. He then served for a time as an assistant executive director of the church's Temple Department. In October 2015, he gave a significant address on the LDS Church in Africa at the University of Utah's "black, white and Mormon" conference.

Sitati spoke at the Sunday afternoon session of general conference on October 4, 2009, where he stated the LDS Church is a "global faith." Sitati spoke again in the April 2015 general conference on the subject of the commandment to be fruitful, multiply, and subdue the earth, saying that God has not revoked this commandment.

During the church's October 2022 general conference, Sitati was released as a general authority and given emeritus status. He also spoke during the conference.

=== Advisor assignment ===
After his time with the West Africa Area, Sitati was transferred to church headquarters and took up residence in Utah.

Sitati became an adviser to the church magazines in 2014. In 2015, Sitati became the editor of the church magazines, succeeding Craig A. Cardon, who in turn succeeded Sitati as one of the advisers. Sitati also served as assistant executive director of the church's Priesthood and Family Department, and later as an assistant executive director of the Missionary Department and member of the boundary and leadership change committee. Sitati served as one of three general authority seventies who oversaw the work of the church's committee planning the "Be One" celebration marking the 40th anniversary of the priesthood revelation, along with Claudio R. M. Costa and Edward Dube.

=== Area presidency ===
From August 2018 to August 2020, Sitati served as a counselor in the presidency of the church's Africa Southeast Area, residing in South Africa but overseeing the church in about 15 countries with regular travel to many of them. In November 2018, Sitati, along with Neil L. Andersen, met with Kembo Mohadi, Vice President of Zimbabwe. In August 2020, Sitati became president of the newly created Africa Central Area, based in Nairobi, Kenya. The area had over 600,000 members of the LDS Church when it was organized.

== Personal life ==
Sitati and his wife, Gladys, are the parents of five children. A talk she gave was the most recent and final in the book entitled At The Pulpit: 185 years of Discourses by Latter-day Saint Women.

== See also ==
- Black people and Mormonism
- List of general authorities of The Church of Jesus Christ of Latter-day Saints
