= Timeline of Black LDS history =

This is a timeline of Black people and the Church of Jesus Christ of Latter-day Saints (LDS Church) and the views of top LDS leaders around Black people. The history of Black people in the LDS Church has been characterized by periods of changing policies and teachings around skin color, Black enslavement, and temple and priesthood eligibility. A racial restriction on temple and priesthood ordinances for Black people was removed in 1978. What began during Mormonism founder Joseph Smith's lifetime as an estimated 100 free and enslaved Black Mormons, has grown to an estimated 400,000 to one million Black LDS Church adherents worldwide as of 2019. (Note: The LDS Church does not keep records of the racial makeup of its membership, but the worldwide number of 21st-century Black adherents has been estimated at 400,000, 500,000, over 700,000, and one million.)

== 1830–1844: During Joseph Smith's leadership ==
- 1830 – The Book of Mormon is published, containing verses describing a "skin of blackness" as a curse placed upon the Lamanites for their rebellion, while also stating that the Lord "denieth none that come unto him, black and white, bond and free."
- 1830 – "Black Pete," a formerly enslaved man, joins the church in Kirtland, Ohio, becoming the first known convert of Black African descent.

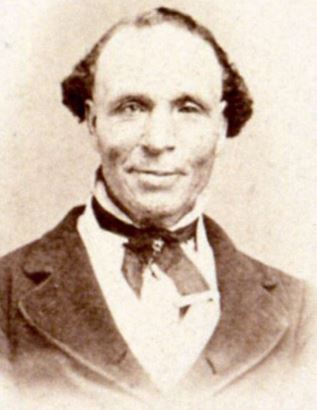
Elijah Abel was an early LDS priesthood leader in the quorum of the seventy.

- 1832 – Elijah Abel, a carpenter of Black African descent, is baptized in Maryland.
- 1832 – Joseph Smith authors what later became Doctrine and Covenants section 87 which stated that war would be poured out upon all nations, beginning with the rebellion of South Carolina, and that "slaves shall rise up against their masters."
- 1833 – W. W. Phelps publishes an article titled "Free People of Color" in the church newspaper inviting free Black people to worship with the Saints in Missouri. The article is interpreted by local non-Mormons as an invitation for free Black people to settle in the state, sparking mob violence and the expulsion of Mormons from Jackson County.
- 1835 – The church issues an official statement (included in the Doctrine and Covenants as section 134) stating it is not "right to interfere with bond-servants, neither preach the gospel to, nor baptize them contrary to the will and wish of their masters."
- 1835 – Top LDS leader W. W. Phelps writes a letter theorizing that the wife of Ham was a descendant of Cain, introducing the idea that the "curse of Cain" was preserved through the Flood via an interracial marriage.
- 1836 – Elijah Abel is ordained to the priesthood office of Elder by Joseph Smith. Later that year, he is ordained a Seventy, a missionary office.
- 1836 – In a letter to the editor of the Latter Day Saints' Messenger and Advocate, Joseph Smith expresses some of his views on Black people including opposition to the abolitionist movement and offers a justification for the enslavement of Black people based on the biblical Curse of Ham.
- 1842 – The church publishes the Book of Abraham, which contains verses stating that the Pharaohs of Egypt were cursed as to the priesthood because they were descendants of Ham. This text becomes a primary scriptural basis for the temple and priesthood ban.
- 1842 – Joseph Smith writes in his journal advocating for the end of slavery, stating that slaves should be brought into "free country and set ... free—educate them and give them equal rights."
- 1843 – Walker Lewis, a Black man, is ordained an Elder by Joseph's brother William Smith.
- 1844 – As part of his presidential campaign, Joseph Smith advocates for the abolition of slavery by 1850 through the sale of public lands.
- 1844 – Joseph T. Ball, a Black priesthood holder, serves as the branch president (local leader) of the Boston Branch, the largest congregation of the church outside of Nauvoo at the time.
- 1844 – As mayor of Nauvoo, Joseph Smith holds a trial and fines two African American men the modern equivalent of thousands of dollars for trying to marry White women.

== 1845–1899 ==
- 1845 – Orson Hyde speaks at a general conference, suggesting that the "cursed lineage" of Canaan was a result of neutral behavior in the War in Heaven, a concept that would later evolve into the "fence-sitter" doctrine.

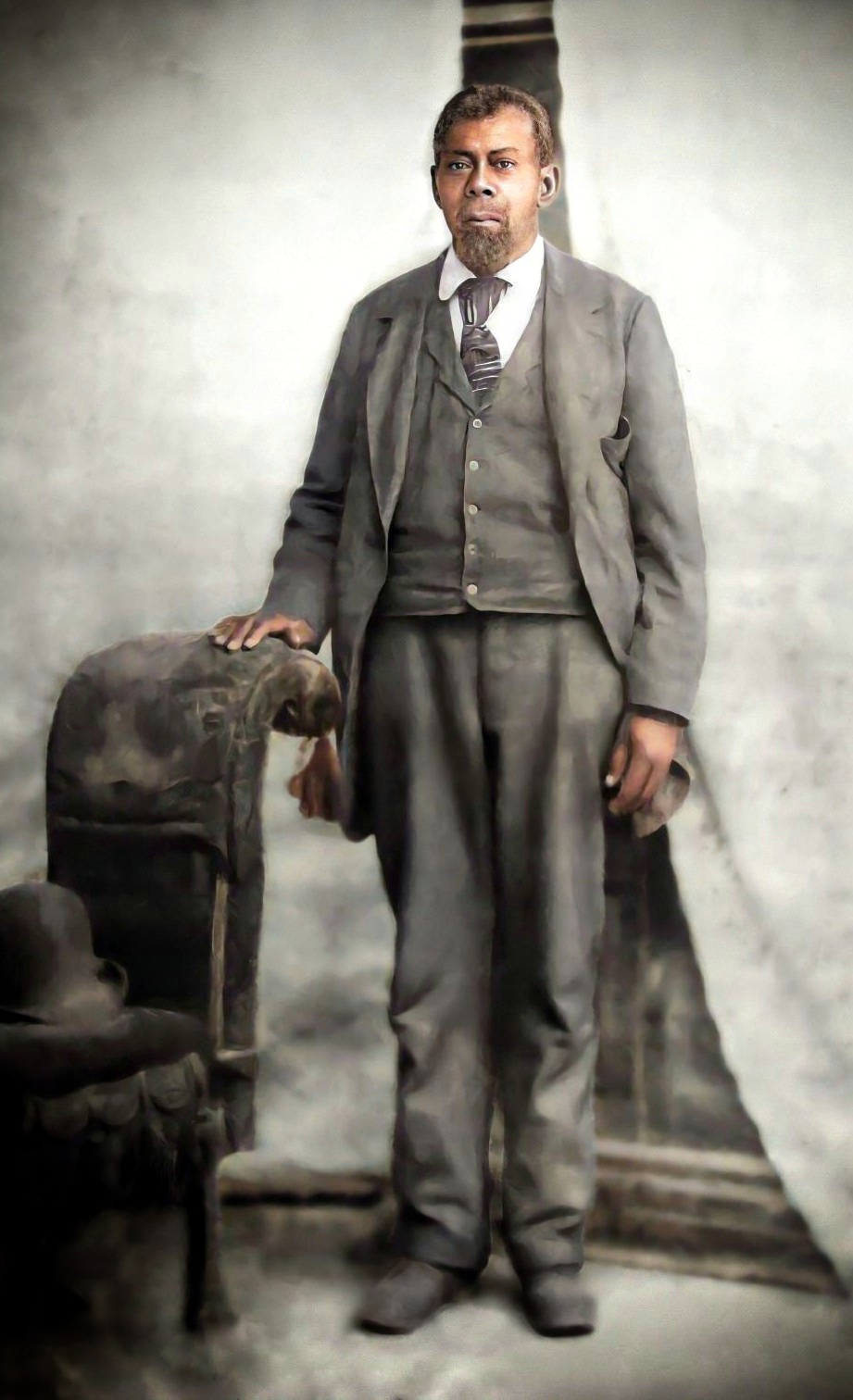
Green Flake was an enslaved man who reportedly drove one of the first wagonloads of LDS pioneers to the Salt Lake Valley.

- 1847 – Green Flake, Hark Lay, and Oscar Crosby, three enslaved men, are part of the vanguard pioneer company that enters the Salt Lake Valley in July.
- 1847 – William McCary, a Black convert, is excommunicated for apostasy after claiming to be a prophet and instituting his own unauthorized polygamous sealings with white women. This event contributes to rising racial tensions within the church leadership.
- 1847 – Young declares the punishment for Black–White interracial marriages was death. He repeated this statement in 1852 and 1865.
- 1852 – In a speech to the Utah Territorial Legislature, Brigham Young publicly announces a policy restricting Black men from holding the priesthood. He teaches that Black people are the "seed of Cain" and are cursed to be servants until all other descendants of Adam receive the priesthood, and the killing of a Black–White interracial couple and their children as part of a blood atonement would be a blessing to them. He further stated that interracial children are sterile "like a mule". This belief was repeated by George Reynolds in a church magazine in 1868.
- 1852 – The legislature passes the Act in Relation to Service, legalizing slavery in Utah Territory.
- 1853 – Elijah Abel requests to receive his temple endowment but is denied by Brigham Young.

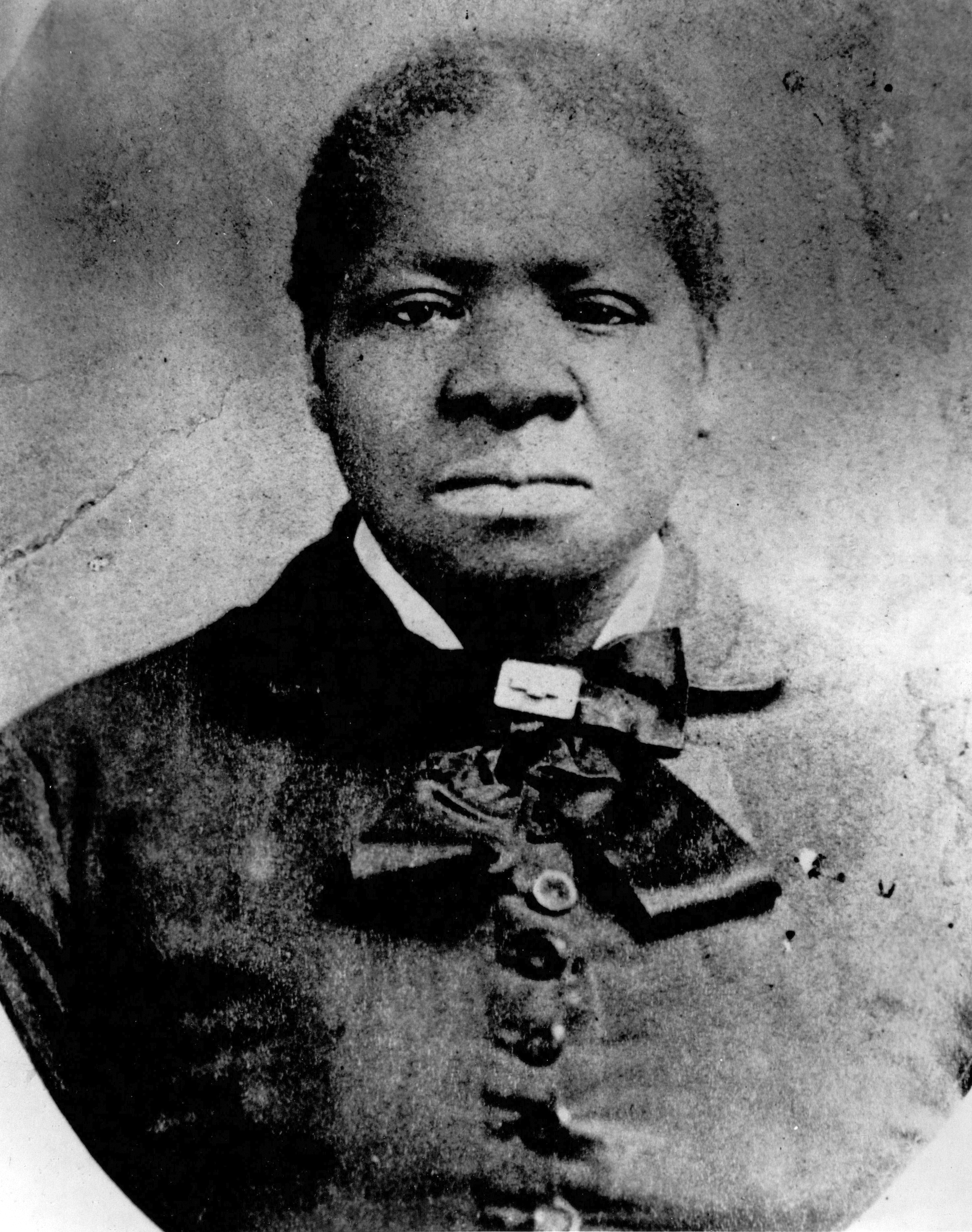
In 1856 Biddy Mason and others successfully sued for their freedom after being illegally held enslaved by white Mormons in San Bernardino, California.

- 1856 – Biddy Mason and 14 other Black enslaved people successfully sue for their freedom after being illegally held captive by white Mormons in San Bernardino, California.
- 1863 – Brigham Young states that the penalty for interracial marriage between a white person and a Black person is death, stating "this will always be so."
- 1879 – Elijah Abel serves a third mission for the church, preaching in Ohio, despite the priesthood ban preventing new ordinations.
- 1879 – A meeting is held at the residence of Abraham O. Smoot where Zebedee Coltrin and Smoot provide conflicting testimony claiming Joseph Smith was the originator of the priesthood ban, contradicting the documents of Elijah Abel's ordination. This meeting is instrumental in solidifying the memory of the ban as originating with Smith rather than Young.
- 1880 – Elijah Abel appeals to church president John Taylor for permission to receive his temple ordinances. His request is denied after an investigation into whether his priesthood was authorized.
- 1884 – Elijah Abel dies, remaining a priesthood holder in good standing until his death.

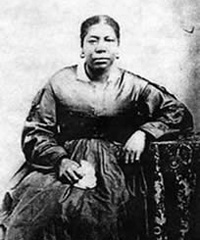
Jane Manning was an early church member and servant in Smith's household in Nauvoo.

- 1890 – Jane Manning James, a Black woman who had lived with Joseph Smith's family in Nauvoo, repeatedly requests to be sealed to Smith as a child. She is eventually allowed a unique "attachment" ceremony as a servant in the Smith family, rather than a standard adoption sealing.

== 1900–1977 ==
- 1900 – Enoch Abel, the son of Elijah Abel, is ordained an Elder in the priesthood, an exception to the general policy.
- 1908 – Church president Joseph F. Smith decides that Elijah Abel's priesthood ordination was "null and void," reversing earlier acknowledgments. This cements the "one-drop rule" policy, barring anyone with any Black African ancestry from the priesthood or temple.
- 1934 – Elijah Abel, the grandson of the original Elijah Abel, is ordained to the office of Priest in the Aaronic priesthood.
- 1935 – The grandson Elijah Abel is ordained an Elder in the Melchizedek priesthood.
- 1945 – Abner Howell, a Black member in Utah, is given a calling card designating him as an "Honorary High Priest" by church leaders, allowing him to access some church privileges while strictly maintaining the temple and priesthood ban.
- 1947 – The First Presidency exchanges letters with sociologist Lowry Nelson, stating that the priesthood ban is not merely policy but a "doctrine of the Church" based on "divine laws" and "faithfulness in the premortal existence."
- 1949 – The First Presidency under George Albert Smith issues a statement asserting that the priesthood restriction is "the result of our conduct in our pre-existent life."
- 1954 – Church president David O. McKay visits South Africa and modifies the policy there to allow men to hold the priesthood unless they have proven Black ancestry, reversing the burden of proof required previously.
- 1960s – The church faces increasing pressure from the civil rights movement. The NAACP criticizes the church's stance on civil rights and priesthood restriction.
- 1963 – Church leaders in Nigeria attempt to set up an official mission where converts would be organized into auxiliaries without priesthood leadership, but the plan is halted by the Quorum of the Twelve.
- 1965 – Due to the church's policy on blood transfusions, which discouraged white members from receiving blood from Black donors, the LDS Hospital in Salt Lake City maintains a segregated blood bank until the policy is reversed around this time.
- 1967 – Stewart Udall, a prominent Mormon and U.S. Secretary of the Interior, publishes a letter in the scholarly Mormon journal Dialogue openly criticizing the church's racial restrictions.
- 1969 – The "Wyoming 14," a group of 14 Black football players from the University of Wyoming, are dismissed from their team for planning to wear black armbands in protest of the LDS Church's racial policies during a game against Brigham Young University.
- 1969 – Amidst external protests, the First Presidency issues a statement signed by Hugh B. Brown and N. Eldon Tanner re-affirming the restriction but removing references to pre-mortal unworthiness as the cause.
- 1971 – The Genesis Group is established as a support auxiliary for Black members of the church, under the direction of Elders Gordon B. Hinckley, Thomas S. Monson, and Boyd K. Packer. Ruffin Bridgeforth serves as the first president.
- 1974 – The Boy Scouts of America policy prohibiting Black scouts from serving as senior patrol leaders in LDS-sponsored troops is challenged by the NAACP. The church agrees to change the policy, allowing Black scouts to hold leadership positions.
- 1976 – Douglas A. Wallace is excommunicated after ordaining a Black man, Larry Lester, to the priesthood in an unauthorized attempt to challenge the church's ban.
- 1977 – Byron Marchant is excommunicated for casting the first opposing vote in modern General Conference history, citing the racial restriction as his reason.

== 1978–Present ==
- 1978 – On June 8, the First Presidency announces a lifting of the temple and priesthood ban (canonized as Official Declaration 2).

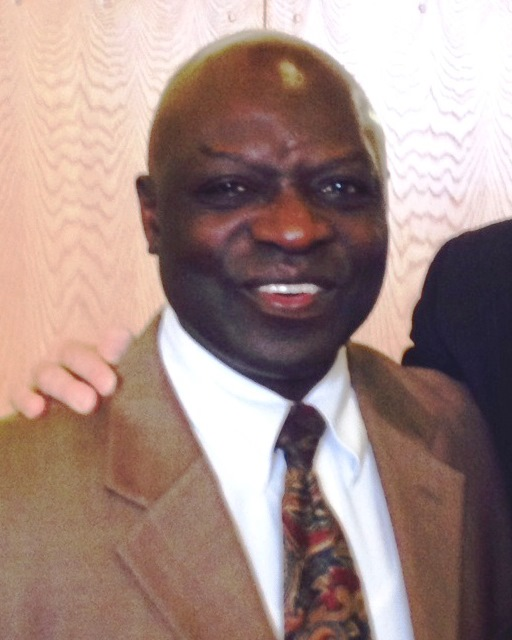
Joseph Freeman was the first Black person ordained to the priesthood after the ban lift

- 1978 – Joseph Freeman becomes the first Black man ordained to the priesthood following the revelation.
- 1990 – Helvécio Martins becomes the first Black General Authority of the church.

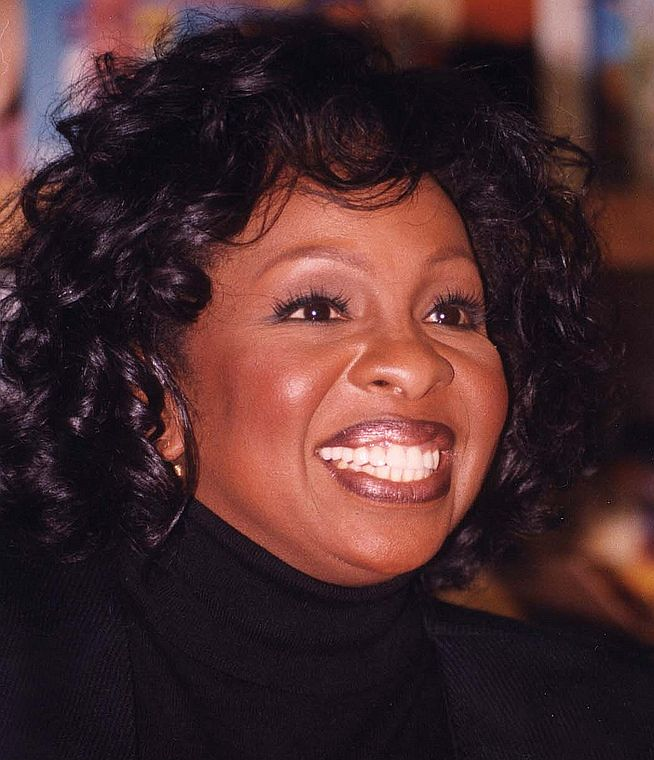
Singer Gladys Knight is a prominent member of the church.

- 1997 – Singer Gladys Knight joins the LDS Church and becomes a prominent figure.
- 2013 – The church publishes the essay "Race and the Priesthood" on its official website, disavowing past statements that black skin is a sign of divine disfavor or curse, or that it reflects unrighteousness in a premortal life. The essay specifically rejects the Curse of Ham and Curse of Cain as justifications for the ban.

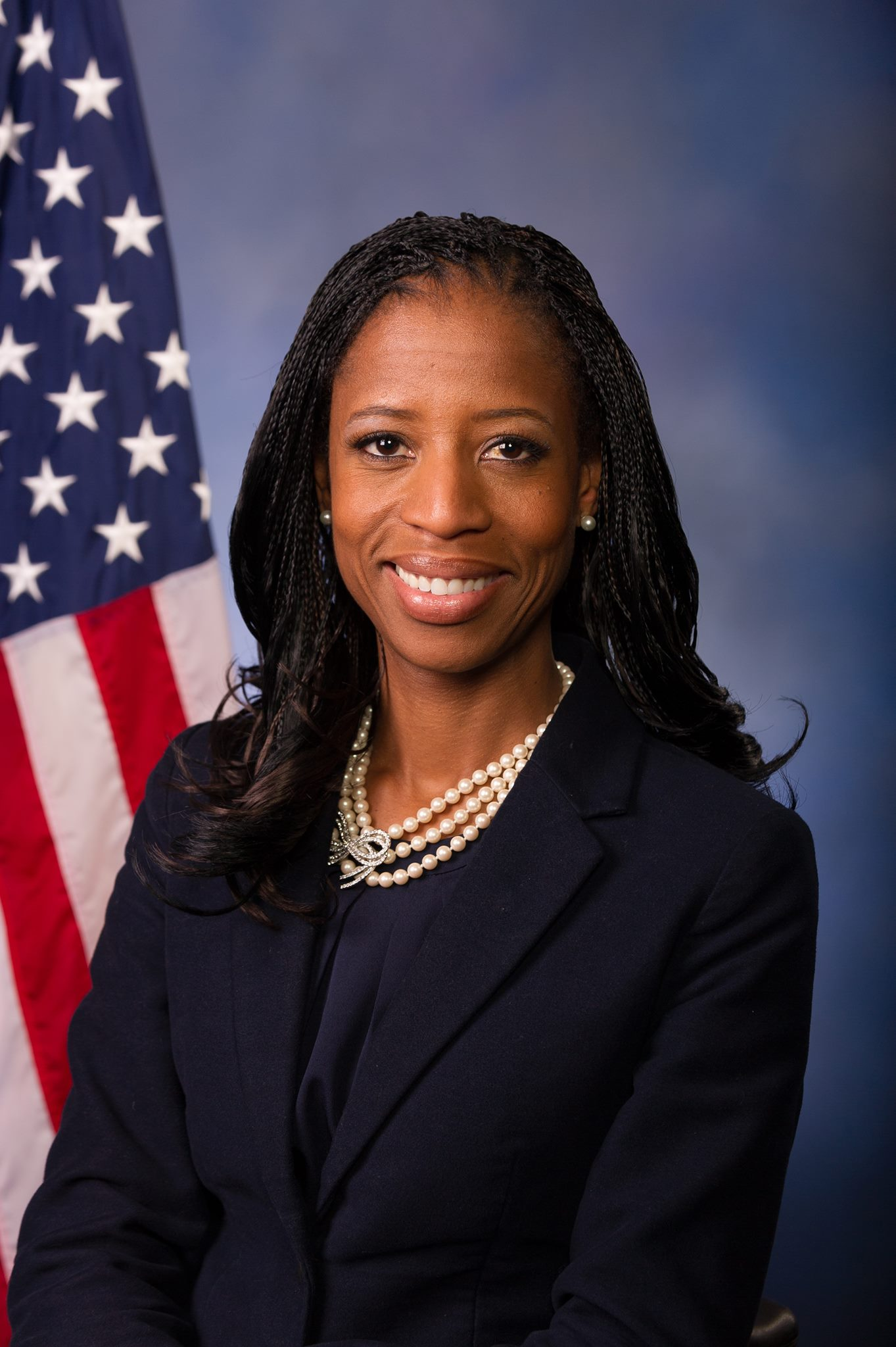
Mia Love's official US congressional portrait.

- 2015 – LDS member Mia Love becomes the first Republican Black woman elected to the US national Congress.
- 2018 – The church holds the "Be One" celebration to commemorate the 40th anniversary of the removal of the temple and priesthood ban for Black LDS members.
- 2020 – Church president Russell M. Nelson issues a joint statement with the NAACP calling for racial reform in the United States.
