= Black people and Mormonism =

During the history of the Latter Day Saint movement, the relationship between Black people and Mormonism has included enslavement, exclusion and inclusion, and official and unofficial discrimination. Black people have been involved with the Latter Day Saint movement since its inception in the 1830s. Their experiences have varied widely, depending on the denomination within Mormonism and the time of their involvement. From the mid-1800s to 1978, Mormonism's largest denomination – the Church of Jesus Christ of Latter-day Saints (LDS Church) – barred Black women and men from participating in the ordinances of its temples necessary for the highest level of salvation, and excluded most men of Black African descent from ordination in the church's lay, all-male priesthood. During that time the LDS Church also opposed interracial marriage, supported racial segregation in its communities and church schools, and taught that righteous Black people would be made white after death. The temple and priesthood racial restrictions were lifted by church leaders in 1978. In 2013, the LDS Church disavowed its previous teachings on race for the first time.

The priesthoods of most other Mormon denominations, such as the Bickertonite and Strangite churches, have always been open to members of all races. The same is true in Mormonism's second-largest denomination, the Community of Christ (formerly known as the Reorganized Church of Jesus Christ of Latter Day Saints or the RLDS), except for a few years in which Black people were barred from the priesthood. More conservative denominations, such as the Fundamentalist Church of Jesus Christ of Latter-Day Saints (FLDS), the Apostolic United Brethren (AUB), and the True and Living Church of Jesus Christ of Saints of the Last Days (TLC), continue to exclude Black people as of 2018.

The LDS Church's views on Black people have alternated throughout its history. Early church leaders' views on Black slavery went from neutrality to abolitionism to a pro-slavery view. As early as 1844, church leaders taught that Black people's spirits were less righteous in premortal life (before birth). Mormonism founder Joseph Smith and his successor as church president with the most followers, Brigham Young, both taught that the skin color of Black people was the result of the curses of Cain and Ham. During the 20th century, many LDS leaders opposed the civil rights movement. In recent decades, the church has condemned racism and increased its outreach efforts in Black communities. It is still accused of perpetuating implicit racism by not apologizing for, acknowledging, or adequately counteracting the effects of its past beliefs and discriminatory practices like segregation. Church leaders have worked with the National Association for the Advancement of Colored People (the NAACP) since the 2010s, and have donated millions of dollars to Black organizations.

What began during founder Smith's lifetime as an estimated 100 free and enslaved Black Mormons, has grown to an estimated 400,000 to one million Black LDS Church adherents worldwide as of 2019, (Note: The LDS Church does not keep records of the racial makeup of its membership, but the worldwide number of 21st-century Black adherents has been estimated at 400,000, 500,000, over 700,000, and one million.) and at least five LDS Church temples in Africa. Fourteen more temples are at some stage of development or construction on the continent, in addition to several temples among communities of the African diaspora such as the Dominican Republic and Haiti. The Community of Christ has congregations in twelve African countries, with membership increasing.

== History ==
Early Mormonism had a range of doctrines related to race with regards to Black people of African descent. References to Black people, their social condition during the 19th and 20th centuries, and their spiritual place in Western Christianity as well as in Mormon scripture were complicated.

From the beginning, Black people have been members of Mormon congregations and Mormon congregations have always been interracial. When the Mormons migrated to Missouri, they encountered the pro-slavery sentiments of their neighbors. Joseph Smith upheld the laws regarding Black enslavement, and affirmed the curse of Ham as placing his descendants into slavery, "to the shame and confusion of all who have cried out against the South." After the Mormons were expelled from Missouri, Smith took an increasingly strong anti-slavery position, and several Black men were ordained to the LDS priesthood.

=== New York era (1820s and early 1830s) ===
The first reference to dark skin as a curse and mark from God in Latter Day Saint writings can be found in the Book of Mormon, published in 1830. It refers to a group of people called the Lamanites and states that when they rebelled against God they were cursed with "a skin of blackness" (2 Nephi 5:21).

The mark of blackness was placed upon the Lamanites so the Nephites "might not mix and believe in incorrect traditions which would prove their destruction" (Alma 3:7–9). The Book of Mormon records the Lord as forbidding miscegenation between Lamanites and Nephites (2 Nephi 5:23) and saying they were to stay "separated from thee and thy seed [Nephites], from this time henceforth and forever, except they repent of their wickedness and turn to me that I may have mercy upon them" (Alma 3:14).

However, 2 Nephi 26:33 states: "[The Lord] inviteth them all to come unto him and partake of his goodness; and he denieth none that come, black and white, bond and free, male and female...and all are alike unto God, both Jew and Gentile." Although the Lamanites are labelled as wicked, they actually became more righteous than the Nephites as time passed (Helaman 6).

Throughout the Book of Mormon narrative, several groups of Lamanites did repent and lose the curse. The Anti-Nephi-Lehies or Ammonites "open[ed] a correspondence with them [Nephites], and the curse of God did no more follow them" (Alma 23:18). There is no reference to their skin color being changed. Later, the Book of Mormon records that an additional group of Lamanites converted and that "their curse was taken from them, and their skin became white like unto the Nephites... and they were numbered among the Nephites, and were called Nephites" (3 Nephi 2:15–16).

The curse was also put on others who rebelled. One group of Nephites, called Amlicites "had come out in open rebellion against God; therefore it was expedient that the curse should fall upon them". (Alma 3:18) The Amlicites then put a mark upon themselves. At this point, the author stops the narrative to say "I would that ye should see that they brought upon themselves the curse; and even so doth every man that is cursed bring upon himself his own condemnation."(Alma 3:19) Eventually, the Lamanites "had become, the more part of them, a righteous people, insomuch that their righteousness did exceed that of the Nephites, because of their firmness and their steadiness in the faith." (Helaman 6:1)

The Book of Mormon did not countenance any form of curse-based discrimination. It stated that the Lord "denieth none that come unto him, black and white, bond and free, male and female; and he remembereth the heathen; and all are alike unto God, both Jew and Gentile". (2 Nephi 26:33). In fact, prejudice against people of dark skin was condemned more than once, as in this example:

O my brethren, I fear that unless ye shall repent of your sins that their skins will be whiter than yours, when ye shall be brought with them before the throne of God. Wherefore, a commandment I give unto you, which is the word of God, that ye revile no more against them because of the darkness of their skins; neither shall ye revile against them because of their filthiness... (Jacob 3:8–9).

=== Missouri era (early 1830s to 1838) ===
In the summer of 1833 W. W. Phelps published an article in the church's newspaper, seeming to invite free Black people into the state to become Mormons, and reflecting "in connection with the wonderful events of this age, much is doing towards abolishing slavery, and colonizing the blacks, in Africa." Outrage followed Phelps' comments, (Roberts [1930] 1965, p. 378.) and he was forced to reverse his position, which he claimed was "misunderstood", but this reversal did not end the controversy, and the Mormons were violently expelled from Jackson County, Missouri five months later in December 1833.

In 1835, the Church issued an official statement indicating that because the United States government allowed Black enslavement, the Church would not "interfere with bond-servants, neither preach the gospel to, nor baptize them contrary to the will and wish of their masters, nor meddle with or influence them in the least to cause them to be dissatisfied with their situations in this life, thereby jeopardizing the lives of men." (D&C Section 134:12).

On February 6, 1835, an assistant president of the church, W. W. Phelps, wrote a letter theorizing that the curse of Cain survived the deluge by passing through the wife of Ham, son of Noah, who according to Phelps was a descendant of Cain. (Messenger and Advocate 1:82) In addition, Phelps introduced the idea of a third curse upon Ham himself for "marrying a black wife". (Messenger and Advocate 1:82) This Black wife, according to Phelps, was not just a descendant of Cain, but one of the pre-flood "people of Canaan", not directly related to the Biblical Canaanites after the flood.

In 1836, the rules established by the church for governing assemblies in the Kirtland Temple included attendees who were "bond or free, black or white." (History of the Church, Vol. 2, Ch. 26, p. 368) In 1836, Warren Parrish (Smith's secretary) wrote regarding the sentiments of the people of Kirtland:

Not long since a gentleman of the Presbyterian faith came to this town (Kirtland) and proposed to lecture upon the abolition question. Knowing that there was a large branch of the church of Latter Day Saints in this place, who, as a people, are liberal in our sentiments; he no doubt anticipated great success in establishing his doctrine among us. But in this he was mistaken. The doctrine of Christ and the systems of men are at issue and consequently will not harmonize together.

— Messenger and Advocate Volume 2, Number 7

The Church never denied membership based on race (although enslaved Black people had to have their enslaver's permission to be baptized), and several Black men were ordained to the priesthood during Joseph Smith's lifetime. The first known Black Latter-day Saint was "Black Pete", who joined the Church in Kirtland, Ohio, and there is evidence that he held the priesthood. Other African Americans, including Elijah Abel in 1832, Joseph T. Ball in 1835 or 1836 (who also presided over the Boston Branch from 1844–1845), and Walker Lewis in 1843 (and probably his son, Enoch Lovejoy Lewis), were ordained to the priesthood during Smith's lifetime. William McCary was ordained in Nauvoo in 1846 by Apostle Orson Hyde. Two of the descendants of Elijah Abel were also ordained Elders, and two other Black men, Samuel Chambers and Edward Leggroan, were ordained Deacons.

Early Black members in the Church were admitted to the temple in Kirtland, Ohio, where Elijah Abel received the ritual of washing and anointing (see Journal of Zebedee Coltrin). Abel also participated in at least two baptisms for the dead in Nauvoo, Illinois, as did Elder Joseph T. Ball.

=== Nauvoo era prior to Smith's death (1838 to 1844) ===
In 1838, and throughout the 19th century the term "species" was borrowed and commonly used to imply that the Black population was inferior. The biological use of the term species was first defined in 1686. In 1838, Joseph Smith answered the following question while en route from Kirtland to Missouri, as follows: "Are the Mormons abolitionists? No ... we do not believe in setting the Negroes free." (Smith 1977, p. 120)

By 1839 there were about a dozen Black members in the Church. Nauvoo, Illinois, was reported to have 22 Black members, including free and enslaved individuals, between 1839 and 1843 (Late Persecution of the Church of Latter-day Saints, 1840).

In the evening debated with John C. Bennett and others to show that the Indians have greater cause to complain of the treatment of the whites, than the negroes or sons of Cain

— History of the Church 4:501.

Beginning in 1842, Smith made known his increasingly strong anti-slavery position. In March 1842, he began studying some abolitionist literature, and stated, "it makes my blood boil within me to reflect upon the injustice, cruelty, and oppression of the rulers of the people. When will these things cease to be, and the Constitution and the laws again bear rule?" (History of the Church, 4:544). On February 7, 1844, Joseph Smith wrote his views as a candidate for president of the United States. The anti-slavery plank of his platform called for a gradual end to Black enslavement by the year 1850. His plan called for the government to buy the freedom of enslaved persons using money from the sale of public lands.

My cogitations, like Daniel's have for a long time troubled me, when I viewed the condition of men throughout the world, and more especially in this boasted realm, where the Declaration of Independence "holds these truths to be self-evident, that all men are created equal; that they are endowed by their Creator with certain unalienable rights; that among these are life, liberty, and the pursuit of happiness;" but at the same time some two or three millions of people are held as slaves for life, because the spirit in them is covered with a darker skin than ours.

— History of the Church, Vol.6, Ch.8, pp. 197–198

== Joseph Smith's views ==
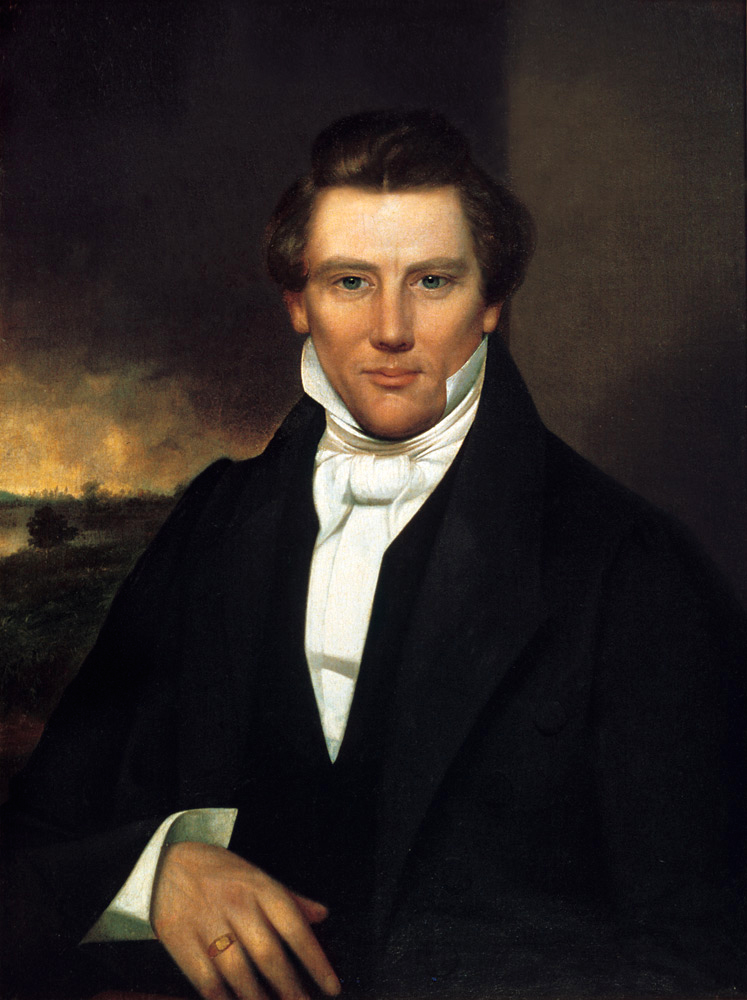
Mormonism's founder, Joseph Smith, expressed a range of views about Black people throughout his life.

Joseph Smith's views on Black people varied during his lifetime. As founder of the Latter Day Saint movement, Smith included Black people in many ordinances and priesthood ordinations but had differing views on racial segregation and the curses of Cain and Ham. He shifted his views on slavery several times, eventually taking an anti-slavery stance later in life.

=== On slavery ===
Smith initially expressed opposition to slavery, but avoided discussion of the topic after the church was formally organized in 1830. During the Missouri years, he tried to maintain peace with the members' pro-slavery neighbors; in 1835, the church declared it was not "right to interfere with bond-servants, nor baptize them contrary to the will and wish of their masters" or cause "them to be dissatisfied with their situations in this life." Smith published an essay sympathetic to slavery the following year, arguing against a possible "race war", providing justification for slavery based on the biblical curse of Ham, and saying that northerners had no "more right to say that the South shall not hold slaves, than the South have to say that the North shall." During the Nauvoo settlement, Smith began preaching abolitionism and equality of the races. He called for "the break down [of] slavery" during his 1844 presidential campaign, and wanted to free all enslaved persons by 1850.

=== On temple and priesthood access ===
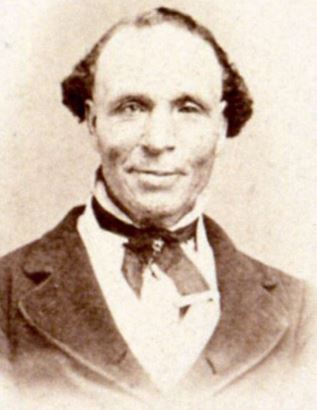
Elijah Abel was an early LDS priesthood leader in the quorum of the seventy.

Smith was apparently present at the priesthood ordination of Elijah Abel, a multi-ethnic man with partial Black heritage, to the offices of elder and the seventy and there is good evidence that at least three other Black men (William McCary, Walker Lewis, and Peter Kerr were ordained to the priesthood of the early church. Although Abel received his washing and anointing temple ordinance under Smith, he did not receive the temple endowments; his petition for them was denied over thirty years later, and there is no record of any Black individuals receiving the Nauvoo endowment. After Smith's death, Brigham Young barred Black people from temple endowments, marriage sealings, and the priesthood. There is no contemporary evidence suggesting that the anti-Black-priesthood restriction originated with Smith.

=== On equality and segregation ===
Smith said that Black and white people would be better off if they were "separate but legally equal", advocating segregation: "Had I anything to do with the negro, I would confine them by strict law to their own species, and put them on a national equalization." He also said, "They have souls, and are subjects of salvation. Go into Cincinnati or any city, and find an educated negro, who rides in his carriage, and you will see a man who has risen by the powers of his own mind to his exalted state of respectability."

== LDS policies and teachings ==
=== Premortal life ===
After Smith's death in 1844 and a six-month succession crisis, his most popular successor was Brigham Young; the Brighamite branch of Mormonism became the LDS Church. By that year, LDS leaders justified discriminatory policies with the belief that the spirits of Black individuals before earthly life were "fence sitters" between God and the devil and were less virtuous than white souls. Young rejected this explanation, but apostles Orson Pratt, Orson Hyde, and John Taylor supported the concept and it was accepted widely by LDS members. A century later, in a 1949 statement, the First Presidency (the church's highest governing body) said that Black people were not entitled to the full blessings of the gospel and cited previous revelations on preexistence as justification. After the temple and priesthood ban was reversed in 1978, church leaders refuted the belief that Black people were less valiant in pre-existence. The church disavowed its previous teachings on race for the first time in 2013, denouncing any justification for the temple and priesthood restrictions based on premortality.

=== Curses of Cain and Ham ===
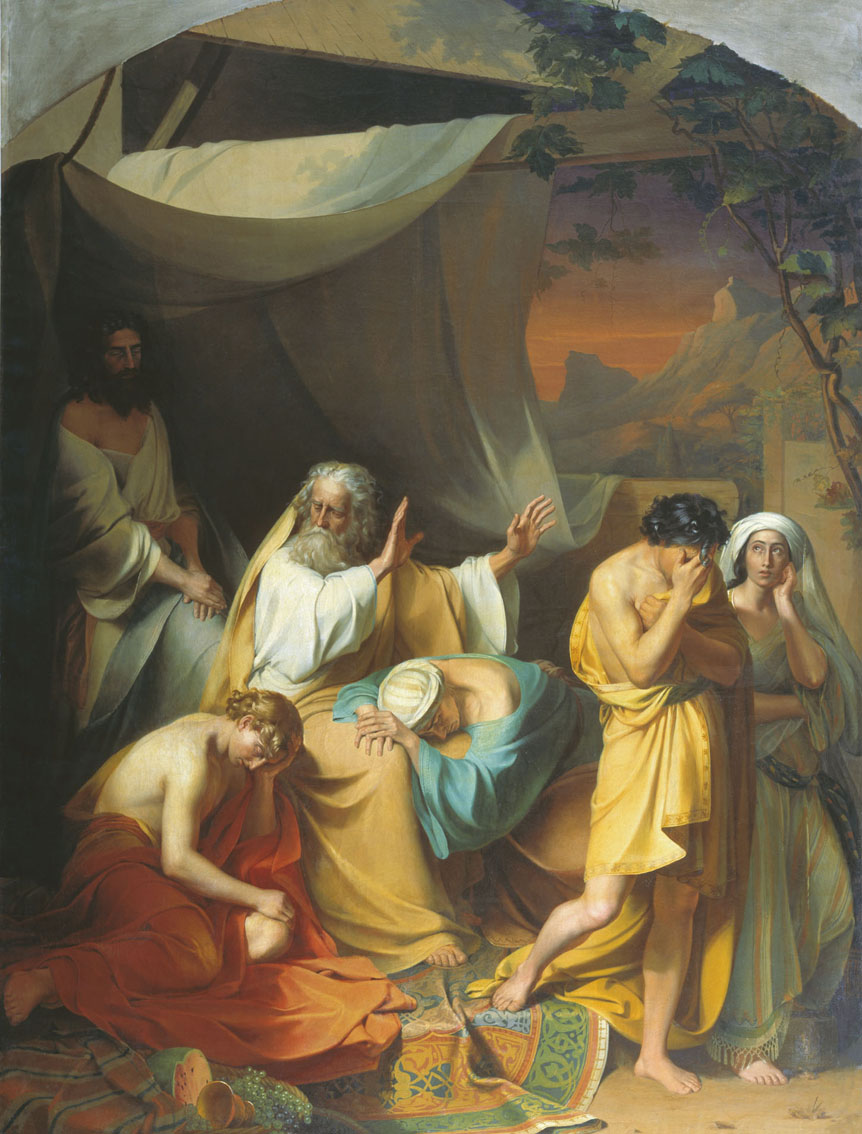
Noah cursing Ham. Smith and Young taught that Black people had the curse of Ham and the curse of Cain.

Teachings about the curse of Cain, the curse of Ham, and their relation to Black people have changed during the church's history. Joseph Smith and Brigham Young called the curse of Ham a justification for Black enslavement. Smith believed that dark skin marked people of Black African ancestry as cursed by God. In his revisions of the King James Bible and production of the Book of Abraham, he traced their state back to the curses placed on Cain and Ham and linked the curses in the Book of Abraham by positioning Ham's Canaanite-cursed posterity as matrilinear descendants of the previously-cursed Cain.

Under Smith's leadership, Brigham Young seemed open to Black people holding the priesthood. As Smith's successor, he used the biblical curses as justification for barring Black men from the priesthood, banning interracial marriages, and opposing Black voting rights. Young said that God's curse on Black people would someday be lifted, and they would be able to receive the priesthood after death.

According to the Bible, God cursed Adam's son Cain and put a mark on him after Cain killed Abel; the text does not specify the nature of the mark. Smith's canonical scripture, the Pearl of Great Price, described the mark of Cain as dark skin; as church president, Young said: "What is the mark [of Cain]? You will see it on the countenance of every African you ever did see". In another biblical account, Adam's eighth great-grandson Ham discovered his father Noah drunk and naked in his tent. Because of this, Noah cursed his grandson Canaan (Ham's son) as "servants of servants". Although LDS scriptures do not mention the skin color of Ham or that of his son, Canaan, some church teachings associated the Hamitic curse with Black people and used it to justify their enslavement.

In 1978, when the church ended the temple and priesthood bans, apostle Bruce R. McConkie taught that the ancient curses of Cain and Ham were no longer in effect. Church leaders disavowed the idea that black skin was the sign of a curse for the first time in 2013.

=== Patriarchal blessings ===
In the LDS Church, patriarchal blessings are given to members. A blessing describes a member's biblical lineage in a tribe of Israel, states their strengths and weaknesses, and advises the future. In the 19th and early 20th centuries, members were more likely to believe that they were descended from a tribe of Israel. Black members of the early LDS church sometimes received no lineage, or received one from a non-Israelite lineage of Ham. After the 1978 revelation, patriarchs sometimes did not declare lineages for Black members; since then, some Black members have requested (and received) a patriarchal blessing which includes a lineage.

=== Righteous Black people will become white ===
Early church leaders taught that after death and resurrection everyone in the celestial kingdom (the highest tier of heaven) would be "white in eternity." They often equated whiteness with righteousness, and taught that God made his children white in his own image. Smith reported that in his vision, Jesus had a "white complexion" and "blue eyes" – a description confirmed in another reported vision by follower Anson Call. A 1959 report by the U.S. Commission on Civil Rights found that most Utah Mormons believed that "by righteous living, the dark-skinned races may again become white and delightsome." The church also taught that the skin of white apostates would darken, and in the temple endowment ceremony (until at least the 1960s) Satan was said to have black skin.

Several Black Mormons were told that they would become white. Hyrum Smith told Jane Manning James that God could give her a new lineage, and promised her in his patriarchal blessing that she would become "white and delightsome". In 1836, Elijah Abel was similarly promised that he would "be made ... white in eternity". Darius Gray, a prominent Black Mormon, was told that his skin color would lighten. In 1978, apostle LeGrand Richards said that the curse of dark skin for wickedness and the promise of white skin through righteousness applied only to Native Americans, and not to Black people.

The LDS Church published a 2013 essay refuting these ideas, describing prior church teachings justifying the restriction as racial "folk beliefs". It said that Blackness in Latter-day Saint theology is a symbol of disobedience to God, and not necessarily a skin color. A Sunday School teacher was removed from their position for teaching from this essay in 2015.

=== Slavery ===
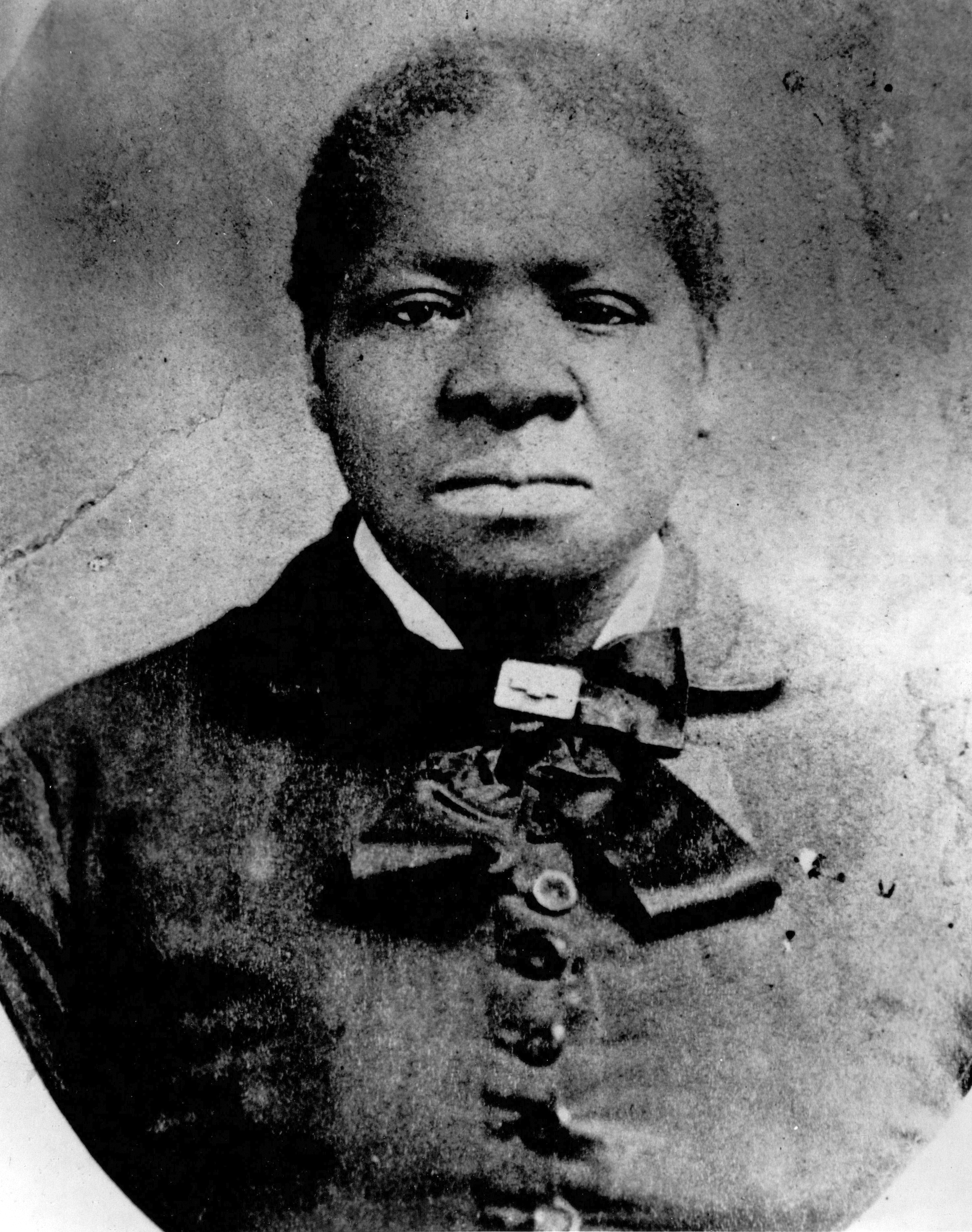
Biddy Mason was one of 14 Black people who sued for their freedom after being illegally held captive by white Mormons in San Bernardino, California.

Initial Mormon converts were from the North and opposed slavery, which caused contention in the slave state of Missouri. The church leadership then began distancing itself from abolitionism, sometimes justifying slavery with Biblical teachings. Several white people who enslaved Black people joined the church and brought their enslaved people when they moved to Nauvoo, Illinois, and the church discouraged influencing enslaved people to be "dissatisfied with their condition". Contention between the mostly-abolitionist Latter-day Saints and slave-owning Southerners led to the Mormon expulsion from Jackson County, Missouri, in the 1838 Mormon War.

Joseph Smith began his presidential campaign on a platform of the government buying enslaved people into freedom over several years. He called for "the break down of slavery" and the removal of "the shackles from the poor black man".

After Smith's murder in 1844, most Latter-day Saints followed Young to Utah (part of the Mexican province of Alta California until 1848) in 1847. Some enslaved people were brought to Utah, although others escaped. Brigham Young began teaching that enslaving people was ordained by God, but remained opposed to creating a slave-based economy in Utah.

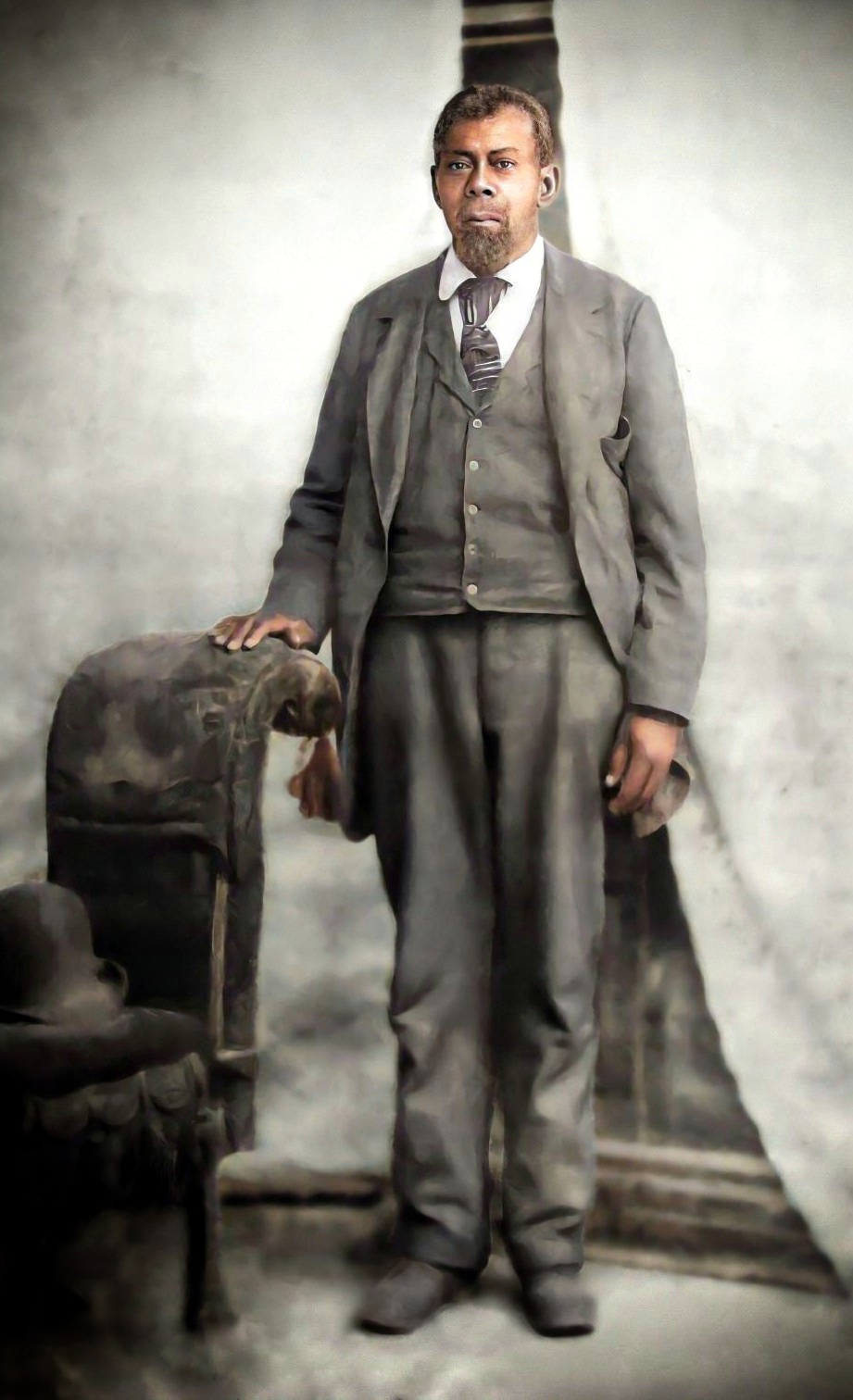
Green Flake was an enslaved man who along with Hark Lay Wales and Oscar Crosby reportedly drove the first wagonloads of LDS pioneers to the Salt Lake Valley in 1847.

The Utah Territory, under Young's governance, legalized the purchase of Black and Native American people for enslavement in 1852. Later that year Young congratulated the legislature stating the legislation had the desired effect and "nearly freed the territory of the colored population." Under Young, Utah passed laws supporting slavery and forbidding Black people from voting, holding public office, joining the local military, or marrying white people. Utah's slavery laws contrasted with those of the Southern states in permitting an enslavement closer to indentured servitude than to the South's plantation slavery. Twenty-six Black people were enslaved in the Utah Territory, according to the 1850 census, and twenty-nine were reported in the 1860 census. Other sources list over 80 enslaved and 30 free Black migrants by the 1850s. Similar to other territories, one objective of the slavery laws was to prevent Black people from settling in Utah and control those already there.

Many prominent church members enslaved people, including William H. Hooper, Abraham O. Smoot, Charles C. Rich, Brigham Young and Heber C. Kimball. Members bought and sold people, gave the church enslaved people as a tithe, and recaptured those who escaped their enslavers. In California, Black enslavement was illegally tolerated in the Mormon community of San Bernardino despite California laws banning the practice. After the Civil War, the US government freed enslaved people and allowed many Black adults to vote. By the early 1920s, there were hundreds of members of the Ku Klux Klan (KKK) in Utah. Although Church leaders opposed the KKK, several LDS members were Klan members.

=== Civil rights ===
After the Civil War, little changed on church stances towards Black people and their rights until the civil rights movement. The NAACP criticized the church's position on civil rights, led anti-discrimination marches and filed a lawsuit against the church in response to its practice of not allowing Black children to be Boy Scout troop leaders. Students from other schools protested against BYU's discriminatory practices and the church's racial restrictions. The church issued a statement supporting civil rights, and changed its Boy Scout leader policy. The apostle Ezra Taft Benson criticized the civil rights movement and challenged accusations of police brutality. Black athletes protested against BYU's discriminatory practices by refusing to play against the school's teams. After the reversal of the temple and priesthood ban in 1978, LDS leaders were relatively silent about civil rights and eventually formed a partnership with the NAACP.

In 2017, local church leaders in Mississippi and the NAACP began to work on projects to restore the NAACP office where Medgar Evers had worked. The following year, it was announced that the church and the NAACP would begin a joint program for the financial education of East Coast residents in Baltimore, Atlanta and Camden, New Jersey. In 2019, church president Russell M. Nelson spoke at the national convention of the NAACP in Detroit. In June 2020, a spokesperson for the NAACP said there was "no willingness on the part of the church to do anything material ... It's time now for more than sweet talk."

In the church's October 2020 general conference, leaders denounced racism and called on church members to take action against it. Nelson asked church members to "lead out in abandoning attitudes and actions of prejudice." That month, in a speech at BYU, apostle Dallin H. Oaks denounced racism, endorsed the message that "Black lives matter" (discouraging its use to advance controversial proposals), and called on church members to root out racist attitudes, behavior and policies.

=== Segregation ===
During the first century of its existence, the church discouraged social interaction or marriage with Black people and encouraged racial segregation in its congregations, facilities, and university, in medical blood supplies, and in public schools. Joseph Smith supported segregation, saying: "I would confine them [Black people] by strict law to their own species". Until 1963, many church leaders supported legalized racial segregation; David O. McKay, J. Reuben Clark, Henry D. Moyle, Ezra Taft Benson, Joseph Fielding Smith, Harold B. Lee, and Mark E. Petersen were leading proponents.

Black families were told by church leadership not to attend church, or chose not to attend after white members complained. The church advocated for segregation laws and enforced segregation at its facilities, such as the Hotel Utah and Tabernacle performances. Church leaders advised members to buy homes so Black people would not move next to LDS chapels. In 1954, apostle Mark E. Petersen taught that segregation was inspired by God. Leaders advocated for the segregation of donated blood, concerned that giving white members blood from Black people might disqualify them from the priesthood. Church leaders opposed desegregation in public schools and at BYU.

=== Interracial marriage ===
Nearly every decade for over a century, from the church's formation in the 1830s until the 1970s, saw denunciations of interracial marriage; most focused on Black–white marriages. The church's stance against interracial marriage was consistent for over a century, while attitudes towards Black people and the priesthood and equal rights changed. Church leaders' views stemmed from the temple and priesthood policies and racist "biological and social" principles of the time.

Under Smith's leadership in Nauvoo, it was illegal for Black men to marry white women; he fined two Black men for violating his prohibition. On at least three occasions (1847, 1852, and 1865), Brigham Young taught that the punishment for Black–white marriages was death; the killing of a Black–white couple and their children was part of a blood atonement which would be a blessing to them. Young also said that if the church approved of white intermarriage with Black people, it would be destroyed and the priesthood would be taken away.

Until (at least) the 1960s, the church penalized white members who married Black people by prohibiting both from entering temples. The temple and priesthood bans were lifted in 1978, but the church still discouraged marriage across ethnic lines. Until 2013, at least one official church manual continued to encouraging members to marry within their race.

== LDS Temple and priesthood restriction ==
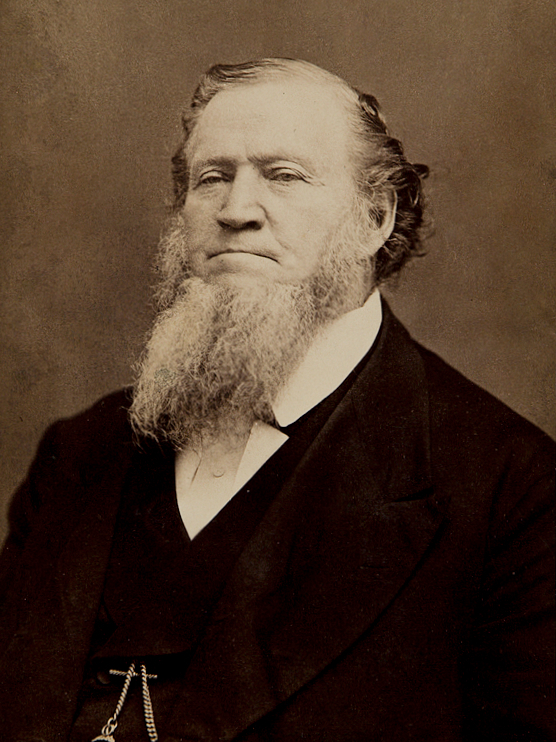
Brigham Young led a branch of followers to Utah and, as governor, legalized Black enslavement and enforced a temple and priesthood ban that would last for over 120 years.

Although a few Black men were ordained to the priesthood under Smith before his death in 1844, from 1849 to 1978 the Brighamite LDS Church prohibited anyone with real (or suspected) Black ancestry from taking part in ordinances in its temples, serving in significant church callings, serving missions, attending priesthood meetings, being ordained to a priesthood office, speaking at firesides, or receiving a lineage in a patriarchal blessing. Non-Black spouses of Black people were also prohibited from entering temples. Because temple ordinances are considered essential to enter the highest degree of heaven, the exclusion meant that Black people were banned from exaltation. The ban was gradually relaxed so Black people could attend priesthood meetings and some people with "questionable lineage" were given the priesthood, such as Fijians, Indigenous Australians, Egyptians, and Brazilians and South Africans with unknown heritage who did not appear to have Black heritage. In 1978, the church's First Presidency released Official Declaration 2, lifting the racial restrictions, in 1978; it was later adopted as scripture.

During more than 120 years of restrictions, the church said that they were instituted by God and offered several race-based explanations, including the belief that Cain and his descendants are cursed, that Ham's marriage to Egyptus put a curse on Canaan's descendants, and Black people were less valiant in their premortal life. Leaders used LDS scriptures to justify the explanations, including the Book of Abraham (which teaches that the descendants of Canaan were Black, and Pharaoh could not have the priesthood because he was one of Canaan's descendants). Since 2013, the previous explanations are no longer accepted as church teachings and the church teaches anti-racism.

=== History ===
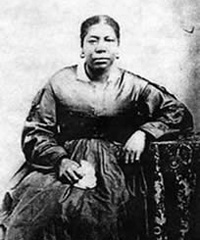
Jane Manning was an early church member and servant in Smith's household in Nauvoo, and followed Young to the Utah Territory. She petitioned church leadership for the temple endowment, but was repeatedly denied because she was Black.

During the early years of the Latter Day Saint movement, at least two Black men became priests: Elijah Abel and Walker Lewis. Abel received the priesthood office of elder and the office of seventy, evidently in Smith's presence. Historians Armand Mauss and Lester E. Bush Jr. found that statements about Smith's support of the ban were the result of reconciliation attempts by later church leaders after his death to square the differing policies of Smith and Brigham Young. Sources suggest several other Black priesthood-holders in the early church, including Peter Kerr and Jamaican immigrant Joseph T. Ball. Other prominent Black members of the early church included Jane Manning James, Green Flake, and Samuel D. Chambers.

After Smith's death in 1844 and a six-month succession crisis, Young became leader of most of Smith's adherents and led the Mormon pioneers to what would become the Utah Territory. Like many American leaders at the time, Young promoted discriminatory views about Black people when he was territorial governor. In 1852, Young established the temple and priesthood ban for Black people while citing no revelation from God or directive from Smith. He told the Utah Territorial Legislature that "any man having one drop of the seed of [Cain] ... in him [could not] hold the priesthood."

=== Doctrine vs. policy ===
Church leaders taught for over a century that the priesthood-ordination and temple-ordinance bans were commanded by God; according to Young, it was a "true eternal principle the Lord Almighty has ordained." In 1949, the First Presidency under George Albert Smith released a statement that the restriction "remains as it has always stood" and was "not a matter of the declaration of a policy but of direct commandment from the Lord". According to historian Matthew Harris this official statement moved what was policy and practice to a "firm and entrenched doctrine". A second First Presidency statement twenty years later, under David O. McKay, re-emphasized that the "seeming discrimination by the Church towards the Negro is not something which originated with man; but goes back into the beginning with God". Church president Spencer W. Kimball said in 1973 that the ban was "not my policy or the Church's policy. It is the policy of the Lord who has established it."

About doctrine versus policy removing racial restrictions, apostle Dallin H. Oaks said in 1988: "I don't know that it's possible to distinguish between policy and doctrine in a church that believes in continuing revelation and sustains its leader as a prophet ... I'm not sure I could justify the difference in doctrine and policy in the fact that before 1978 a person could not hold the priesthood and after 1978 they could hold the priesthood." Research by historians Armand Mauss, Newell G. Bringhurst, and Lester E. Bush has weakened the idea that the ban was doctrinal. Bush said that there was, in fact, no record of a revelation received by Young concerning the ban; justifications for Young's policies were developed much later by church leaders and scholars.

=== End of temple and priesthood bans ===
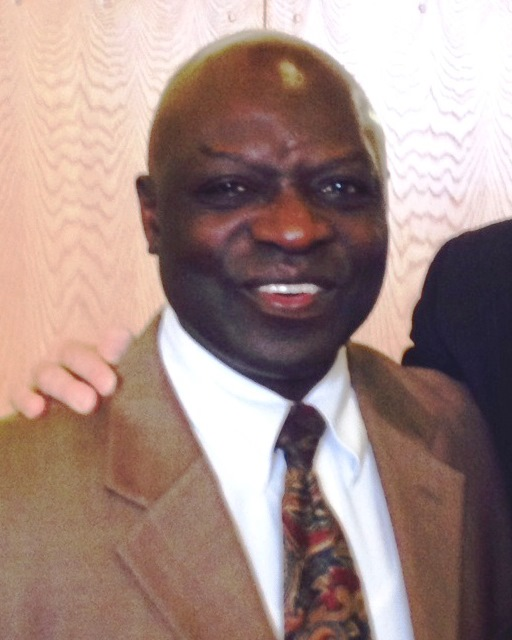
Joseph Freeman was the first Black person ordained to the priesthood after the ban was lifted in 1978.

The LDS church has adapted to environmental pressures throughout its history, including going from polygamy to monogamy, from political separatism to assimilation with the United States, and from communitarian socialism to corporate capitalism. On June 9, 1978, the LDS Church's First Presidency released a declaration allowing "all worthy male members of the church [to] be ordained to the priesthood without regard to race or color", which gave Black women and men access to temple endowments and sealings. It was the most significant church-policy change in decades. According to accounts by several present, the First Presidency and the Quorum of the Twelve Apostles received the revelation to remove the racial restrictions while they prayed in the Salt Lake Temple. Apostle Bruce R. McConkie wrote that all present "received the same message", and were able to understand "the will of the Lord". Many factors led to the change, including pressure from the NAACP, growing membership and a temple in Brazil, pressures from member activists, negative publicity, and the need to resolve doctrinal contradictions. Due to the publicity from Lester Bush's seminal article "Mormonism's Negro Doctrine" in 1973, BYU vice-president Robert Thomas feared that the church would lose its tax-exempt status. The article detailed the church's racially-discriminatory practices and inspired discussion among church leaders, weakening the idea that the temple and priesthood bans were doctrinal.

=== Teachings about restrictions after 1978 ===
The 1978 announcement of the removal of racial restrictions did not give a reason for their removal, renounce, apologize for, or replace them. Because the restrictions were not officially repudiated, their justification persisted in 2020. Apostle McConkie continued to teach until his death that Black people were descended from Cain and Ham, and their curse came from God. His book Mormon Doctrine, published by the church-owned Deseret Book Company, perpetuated racism through a number of editions until it went out of print in 2010. A church spokesperson told reporters in 2005 that despite doctrines continuing to circulate about why people are Black, church leaders saw no need for statements about the topic since 1978.

BYU professor Randy L. Bott said in 2012 that God denied the priesthood to Black men to protect them from the lowest rung of hell, since abusing the priesthood is a damnable sin. Bott compared the priesthood ban to a parent denying young children the keys to the family car: "You couldn't fall off the top of the ladder, because you weren't on the top of the ladder. So, in reality the Black men and boys not having the priesthood was the greatest blessing God could give them." The church said that Bott's views did not represent church doctrine or teachings, and BYU professors do not speak on behalf of the university. The following year, the church disavowed teachings that Black skin was a sign of a curse for the first time. As of 2019 the church has not apologized for its past racist teachings and policies around Black people.

In a landmark 2016 survey, almost two-thirds of 1,156 self-identified Latter-day Saints reported believing that the pre-1978 temple and priesthood ban was "God's will". Nonwhite church members were almost 10 percent more likely to believe that the ban was "God's will" than white members.

In 2022, BYU professor and Young Men general presidency member Brad Wilcox was criticized for a speech in which he downplayed and dismissed concerns about the priesthood and temple ban. Although Wilcox issued two apologies, reporter Jana Riess wrote that his scornful tone and words indicated that he "felt disdainful toward women" and believed that "God is a racist". Riess called his apologies "not-quite-apologies", and said that they did not go far enough. Videos document at least two other instances of Wilcox making similar speeches. Historian W. Paul Reeve said about the controversy that church leaders had not clarified as of 2022 whether the original ban was divinely inspired or not, nor had they disavowed the racial restrictions, resulting in members like Wilcox making controversial statements.

== Member views and actions ==
Some Mormons have held racist views, and exclusion from temple and priesthood rites was not the only discrimination against Black people; as mayor of Nauvoo, Joseph Smith barred them from holding office or joining the Nauvoo Legion military. Brigham Young taught that equality efforts were misguided, saying that those who fought for equality for Black people were trying to elevate them "to an equality with those whom Nature and Nature's God has indicated to be their masters, their superiors".

A 1959 nationwide report by the United States Commission on Civil Rights found that Black people experienced widespread inequality in Utah, and Mormon teachings were used to justify racist treatment. During the 1960s and 1970s, Mormons in the western United States were near the nationwide average in racial attitudes. American racial attitudes caused difficulties when the church tried to apply its one-drop rule to other ethnically-diverse areas such as Brazil; many Brazilian members did not understand American classifications of race and how they applied to the temple and priesthood ban, causing a rift between missionaries and members.

Anti-Black jokes commonly circulated among Mormons before the 1978 revelation. Apostle Spencer W. Kimball began preaching against racism by the early 1970s, calling intolerance by church members "despicable". According to a 1972–1996 study, church members in the United States were shown to have lower rates of approval of segregation than other U.S. groups and a faster decline in approval of segregation.

The church actively opposes racism among its membership, is working to reach out to Black communities, and hosts several predominantly-Black wards in the United States. In 2017, the LDS Church released a statement condemning racism in response to the white-nationalist Unite the Right rally in Virginia. One alt-right church member and blogger called the statement non-binding, since it came from the public-relations department rather than the First Presidency.

=== White opposition to race-based policies ===
During the second half of the 20th century, some white church members protested against teachings and policies excluding Black members from temple ordinances and the priesthood; three members were excommunicated in the 1970s for publicly criticizing these teachings. Other white members who publicly opposed some church teachings and policies concerning Black people were denied access to the temple. Politician Stewart Udall wrote a strongly-worded public letter in 1967 criticizing the church's racial restrictions. His letter received hundreds of critical responses, including letters from apostles Delbert Stapley and Spencer Kimball.

=== Racial discrimination after 1978 ban repeal ===
LDS historian Wayne J. Embry interviewed several Black church members in 1987, and reported that all the participants reported "incidents of aloofness on the part of white members, a reluctance or a refusal to shake hands with them or sit by them, and racist comments made to them." Embry said that one Black woman attended church for three years, despite being ignored by fellow congregants; "she had to write directly to the president of the LDS Church to find out how to be baptized", because none of the other congregants would tell her.

Racism in the church continued after proclamations from church leadership extolling diversity and the 1978 end of the temple and priesthood bans. White church member and BYU professor Eugene England wrote in 1998 that most Mormons still held racist beliefs, including the belief that Black people were descended from Cain and Ham and subject to their curses. England's students at BYU who reported holding these beliefs said that they had learned them from their parents or from instructors at church, and did not know they contradicted current church teachings. Black church member Darron Smith noticed a similar problem in 2003, and wrote in Sunstone about the persistence of racist beliefs. Smith wrote that racism persisted because church leadership had not addressed the ban's origins: the beliefs that Black people were descendants of Cain, that they were neutral in the war in heaven, and that skin color indicated righteousness. Journalist and church member Peggy Fletcher Stack wrote in 2007 that Black Mormons still felt separate from other church members because of their treatment by other members, which ranged from being called the "n-word" to smaller slights. The absence of Black people from church leadership also contributed to Black members' feelings of not belonging.

Alice Faulkner Burch, a leader of the LDS-sponsored Black organization Genesis Group, said in 2016 that Black members "still need support to remain in the church – not for doctrinal reasons but for cultural reasons." Burch added that "women are derided about our hair ... referred to in demeaning terms, our children mistreated, and callings withheld." When asked what Black women in the church wanted, she said that one woman had told her she wished "to be able to attend church once without someone touching my hair."

A 2020 Sunday-school manual contained teachings about "dark skin" in the Book of Mormon being "the sign of [a] curse"; the "curse was the withdrawal of the Spirit of the Lord". Public pressure led the church to change the manual's digital version, which subsequently said that the nature and appearance of the mark of dark skin are not fully understood. A few days later, elder Gary E. Stevenson told a Martin Luther King Day gathering of the NAACP that he was "saddened" by the "error", and the church was "asking members to disregard the paragraph in the printed manual." BYU law professor Michalyn Steele, a Native American, later expressed concern about the church's editorial practices and dismay that church educators continue to perpetuate racism.

In the summer of 2020, Nelson issued a joint statement with three NAACP leaders condemning racism and calling for all institutions to work to eliminate lingering racism. At the October 2020 general conference, Nelson, first counselor Dallin H. Oaks, and apostle Quentin L. Cook denounced racism in their speeches. According to a 2016 survey of self-identified Mormons, over 60 percent said that they know (37 percent) or believe (25.5 percent) that the priesthood and temple ban was God's will; another 17 percent said that it might be true, and 22 percent said that they know (or believe) that it was not God's will. A 2023 survey of over 1,000 former church members in the Mormon corridor found race issues in the church to be one of the top three reported reasons why they had disaffiliated.

== Black membership ==
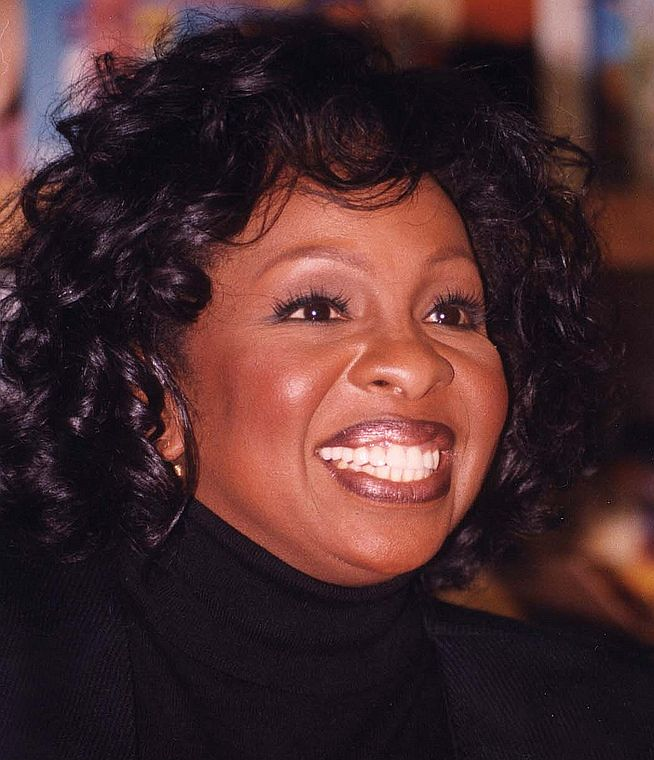
Singer Gladys Knight is a prominent member of the church.

The first statement about proselytizing Black people concerned enslaved individuals. In 1835, church policy was to not proselytize Black people held in slavery unless they had permission from their enslavers. This policy was changed in 1836, when Smith wrote that enslaved people should not be taught the gospel until their owners were converted. Although the church had an open membership policy, it avoided opening missions in areas with large Black populations, discouraged people with Black ancestry from investigating the church, advised members to avoid social interaction with Black people, and instructed Black members to segregate themselves when white members complained about having to worship with them. Relatively few Black people who joined the church retained active membership prior to 1978.

=== Proselytism ===
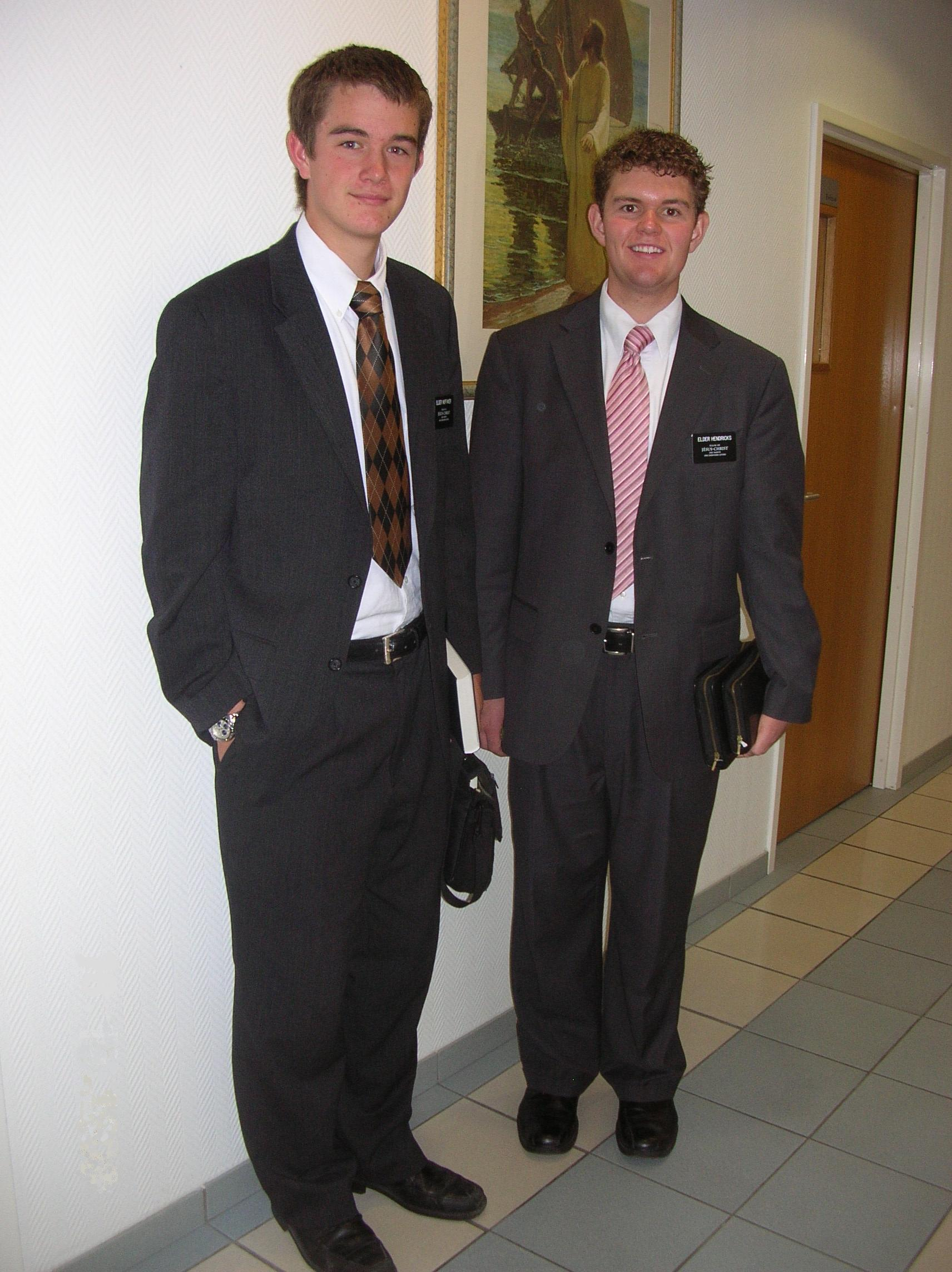
LDS missionaries. Missionaries were instructed to avoid teaching Black people before 1978, but now there are missionaries in a number of mostly-Black cities and countries.

Bruce R. McConkie wrote in his 1966 Mormon Doctrine, the "gospel message of salvation is not carried affirmatively to [Black people], although sometimes negroes search out the truth." Despite interest from several hundred Nigerians, proselytism was abandoned in Nigeria during the 1960s; after the Nigerian government delayed the church's visa, apostles decided against proselyting there. In Africa, the only active missionaries were among white South Africans; Black South Africans who requested baptism were told that the church was not working among them. The church avoided missionary work with native Fijians until 1955, when it said that they were related to other Polynesian groups and not Black. In Brazil, LDS officials discouraged people with Black ancestry from investigating the church; before World War II, proselytism in that country was limited to white German-speaking immigrants. For a time, church headquarters had a group of full-time genealogists tasked with determining priesthood and temple eligibility. The church instituted a genealogy program to uncover Black ancestry, and a person's church records were marked if any was found. In the 1970s, "lineage lessons" were added to determine if interested persons were eligible for being taught by missionaries. Restrictions on proselytizing to Black people were lifted in 1978, and missionaries began entering predominately-Black areas of sub-Saharan Africa.

=== After 1978 ===
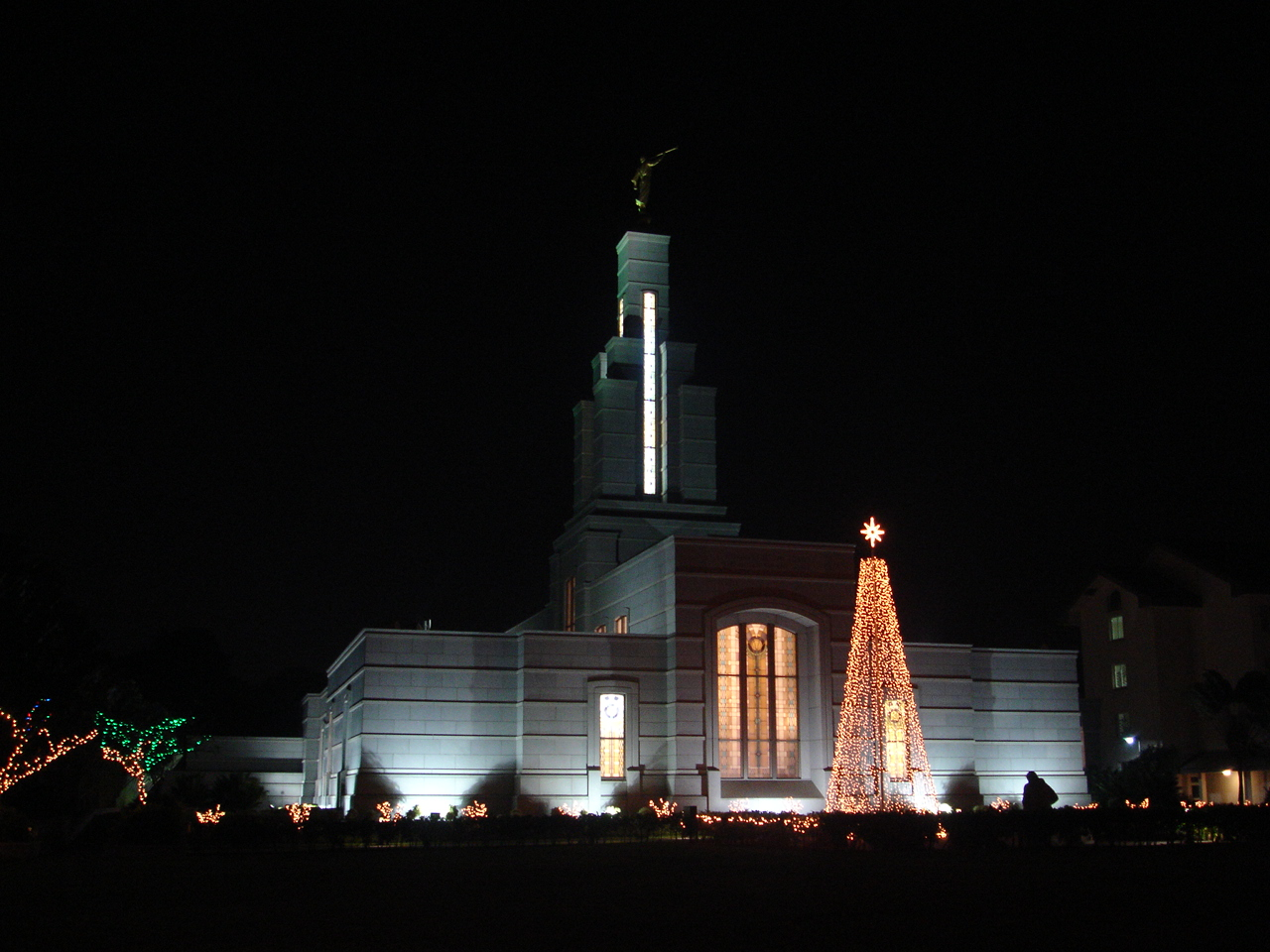
The Accra Ghana Temple, Africa's second

The number of Black members of the LDS Church has grown to an estimated 400,000 to one million as of 2019. Black people have been members of Mormon congregations since the church's founding in the 1830s, but by 1964 its worldwide Black membership was small: an estimated 300 to 400 people. In 1970, the church-sanctioned Black Genesis Group was founded in Salt Lake City. Black membership has increased, especially in Africa. In 1990, Helvécio Martins became the first Black general authority of the LDS Church. A 2007 Pew Poll found that three percent of LDS respondents in the U.S. identified as Black.

The LDS Church announced plans to build a temple in Nairobi in April 2017, bringing the number of temples planned or built in Africa (outside South Africa) to six. That year, two Black South African men were called to serve as mission presidents. Philip Jenkins said in 2009 that growth of the church has been slower in Africa than that of other churches due to its white face (a result of the temple and priesthood ban) and the church's refusal to accommodate local customs such as polygamy.

== Notable Black members of the early LDS movement ==
=== Elijah Abel ===
Although Joseph Smith is not known to have made any statements regarding Black men and the priesthood, he was aware of the ordination of at least one Black man to the office of elder. Elijah Abel was ordained on 3 March 1836 by Zebedee Coltrin. Six months later, he was ordained to the office of seventy and was called to serve in the Third Quorum of the Seventy. Abel served his first mission for the church to New York and Upper Canada. In 1836, he moved from Kirtland to Nauvoo, Illinois, where he participated in the temple ordinance of baptism for the dead. In 1843, a traveling high council visited Cincinnati, where Abel lived, but refused to recognize Abel for the sake of public appearance and called him to his second mission to the "colored population" of Cincinnati.

Abel joined the other Latter-day Saints in Utah Territory in 1853. By then, Brigham Young had formalized church's policies against Black people. His priesthood was referred to on several occasions from Latter-Day Saints who were tracing origins of priesthood denial due to race. Zebedee Coltrin acknowledged that Abel was ordained but claimed he was replaced when his black lineage revealed, but Apostle Joseph F. Smith countered this by pointing out Abel's official certificates given during years others might have been denied due to race. Abel himself reminded them about his own ordination back in 1836 by Zebedee Coltrin, who was now holding to his new version of events. Since there was no agreement, it was accepted that Abel was ordained "before the word of the Lord was fully understood" and therefore no attempt was made to remove Abel's priesthood or drop him from the Third Quorum of the Seventy. He remained active in the Quorum until his death.

=== Green Flake ===
Born in 1829, Green Flake was enslaved by James Madison Flake, converted to the LDS Church, and was baptized at the age of 16 in 1844. He accompanied the Flake family to Nauvoo, Illinois. Green continued to be held as a slave, but was a member of the church throughout his life. From family diaries and the memory of a grandson, it is believed that it was Green who drove the carriage and team that brought President Brigham Young into the Salt Lake Valley. Brigham Young ended Flake's enslavement in 1854.

=== Walker Lewis ===
Walker Lewis was another free Black man who held the Mormon priesthood prior to the death of Joseph Smith. A prominent radical abolitionist, Episcopalian, and Most Worshipful Grand Master of Freemasonry from Lowell and Boston, Massachusetts, Lewis became a Latter Day Saint about 1842. In the summer of 1843, he was ordained an elder in the Melchizedek priesthood. His son, Enoch Lovejoy Lewis, also joined the Latter Day Saints about the same time, and Quaker poet John Greenleaf Whittier heard young Enoch preaching in Lowell just after the death of Joseph Smith in July or August 1844. It has been speculated that Enoch led Young to instigate the ban against Black men holding Mormon priesthood when Enoch L. Lewis married a white Mormon woman, Mary Matilda Webster, in Cambridge, Massachusetts, on September 18, 1846. On December 3, 1847, Young told the Quorum of the Twelve at Winter Quarters that "if they [Enoch and Matilda] were far away from the Gentiles they wod. [would] all be killed – when they mingle seed it is death to all." (Quorum of the Twelve Minutes, December 3, 1847, pp. 6–7, LDS Archives.)

== Other Latter Day Saint group positions ==
=== Community of Christ ===
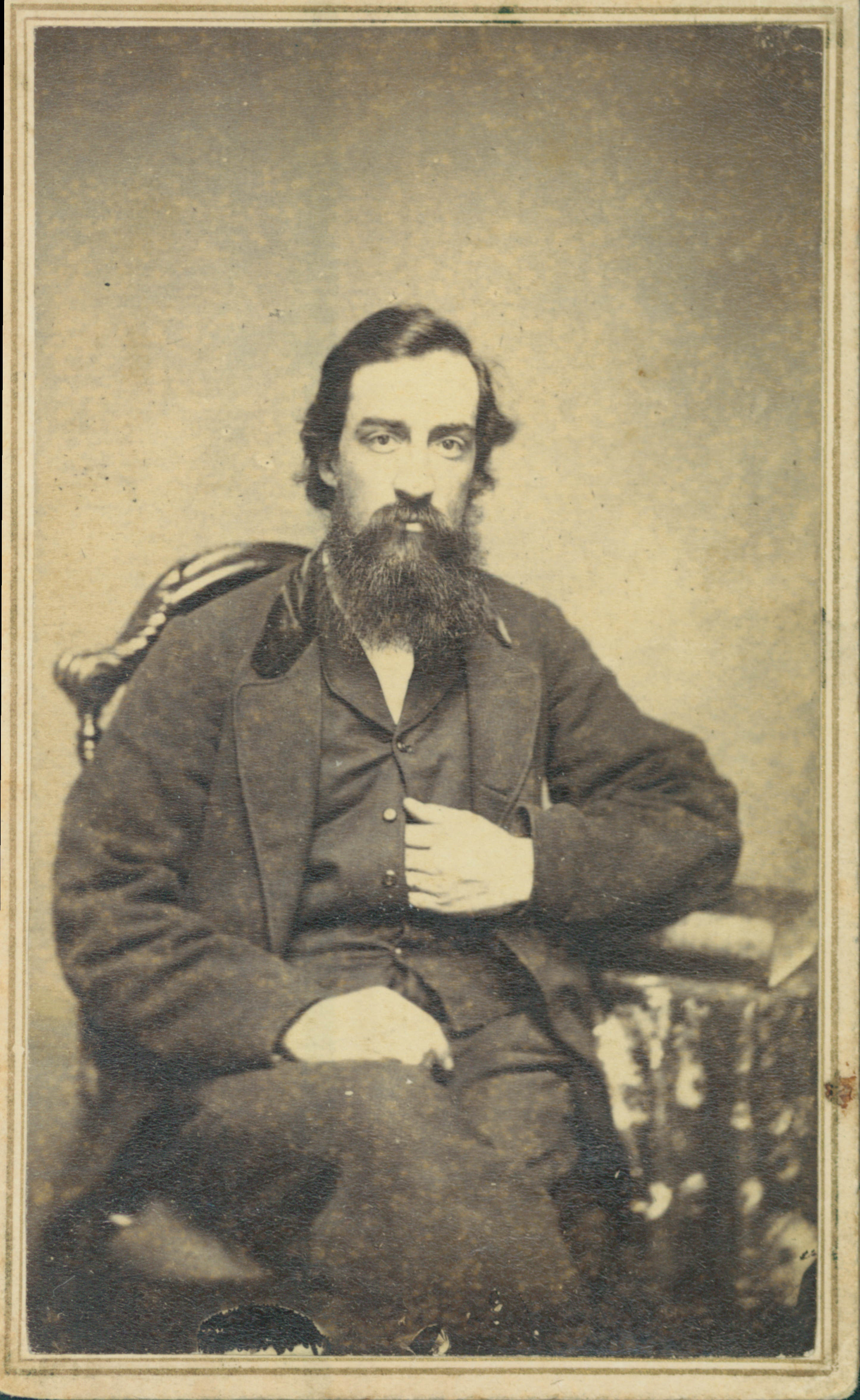
Joseph Smith III opposed slavery, but barred Black people from priesthood offices for the church's first five years and believed that they were inferior to the "ruling races".

Joseph Smith III, the son of Joseph Smith, founded the Reorganized Church of Jesus Christ of Latter Day Saints in 1860 (now known as the Community of Christ). Smith was a vocal advocate of abolishing the slave trade and a supporter of Abraham Lincoln and Owen Lovejoy, an anti-slavery congressman from Illinois; he joined the Republican Party, and advocated its anti-slavery position. He rejected the Fugitive Slave Act of 1850, and said that he would assist people who tried to escape enslavement. However, Smith viewed white people as superior to Blacks and said that they must not "sacrifice the dignity, honor and prestige that may be rightfully attached to the ruling races." The priesthood was not available to Black people between 1860 and 1865, and the first Black man was not ordained to the priesthood until 1893. The Community of Christ rejects the Pearl of Great Price. The church had congregations in twelve African nations in 2020, with Black African membership increasing despite the Western decline in membership.

=== Fundamentalist Church of Jesus Christ of Latter-Day Saints ===
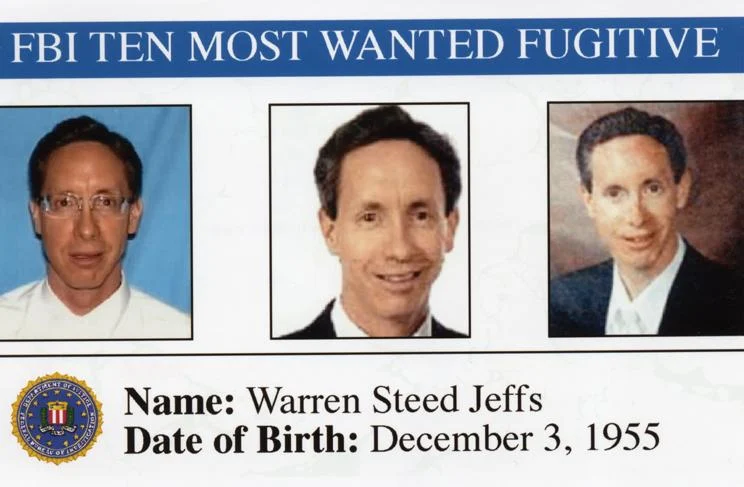
FLDS leader Warren Jeffs has made several anti-Black statements since 2002.

Fundamentalist Church of Jesus Christ of Latter-Day Saints (FLDS) president Warren Jeffs has made several anti-Black public statements since 2002. These include saying that the devil brings evil to the earth through Black people, that Cain is the father of the Black race, that people with "Negro blood" are unworthy of the priesthood, that Black-white marriage is evil, and that marrying someone who has "connections with a Negro" would invoke a curse. Former members say that as of 2024 Jeffs continues to remotely lead the organization despite his imprisonment.

=== Apostolic United Brethren ===
The Apostolic United Brethren (AUB) is a Utah-based, Latter Day Saint, polygamous, fundamentalist group that broke away in 1929. In 2018, they continued to deny temple and priesthood rites to people with Black heritage and taught that Black people are "Canaanites" and under the curse of Cain. In 1978, when the LDS church removed its racial restrictions, from dozens to hundreds of families reportedly left it for the AUB.

=== Bickertonite ===
The Church of Jesus Christ (Bickertonite) was founded by William Bickerton, and received many Rigdonite followers from Sidney Rigdon's branch of Mormonism. It has advocated full racial integration in all aspects of the church since its organization in 1862, and suspended an elder in 1905 for opposing the full integration of all races.

Historian Dale Morgan wrote in 1949, "An interesting feature of the Church's doctrine is that it discriminates in no way against ... members of other racial groups, who are fully admitted to all the privileges of the priesthood. It has taken a strong stand for human rights, and was, for example, uncompromisingly against the Ku Klux Klan during that organization's period of ascendancy after the First World War." At a time when institutional racial segregation or discrimination was common throughout the United States, two leaders of the Church of Jesus Christ were Black. The church had a mission in Nigeria.

=== Strangite ===
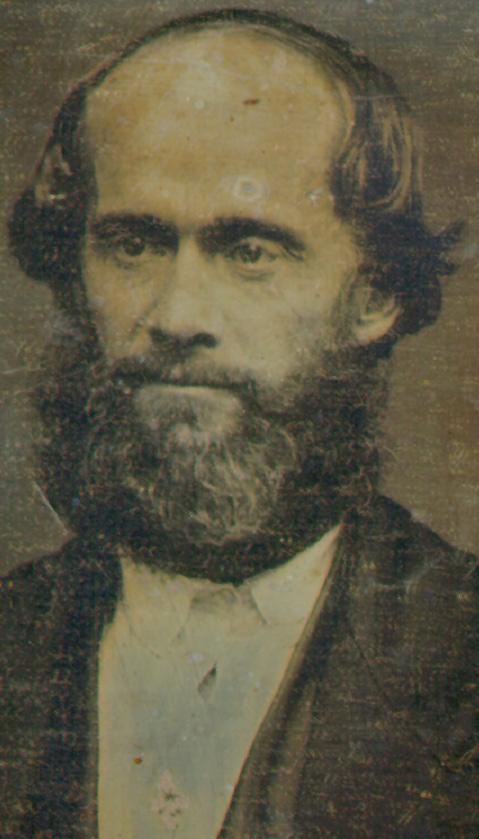
James Strang ordained Black men to the priesthood in his branch of Mormonism.

The Church of Jesus Christ of Latter Day Saints (Strangite), founded by James Strang in 1844, welcomed Black people at a time when other factions denied them the priesthood and other benefits of membership. Strang ordained at least two Black men to his church's priesthood during his lifetime. Although his ethnicity is unclear from the historical record, James T. Ball was identified as Black at least once and joined the Strangites in 1849.

=== True and Living Church of Jesus Christ of Saints of the Last Days ===
The Manti, Utah-based True and Living Church of Jesus Christ of Saints of the Last Days (TLC) branched off from the LDS church in 1990 and as of 2008, it adhered to teachings and practices which were similar to the teachings and practices which were historically adhered to by the LDS church, including the Black temple and priesthood ban, the belief that the skin color of apostates would darken, and the practice of polygamy. The TLC's founder James D. Harmston taught his followers that the LDS Church's leader Gordon Hinckley was Cain in a previous life.

== See also ==
- Black people and temple and priesthood policies in the LDS Church
- Christian views on slavery
- Criticism of the Book of Mormon
- Criticism of the LDS Church
- History of African Americans in Utah
- Mormonism and slavery
- Mormonism and violence
- Native American people and Mormonism
- Pacific Islanders and Mormonism
- Phrenology and the Latter Day Saint movement
- Racial segregation of churches in the United States
