= Peter Kerr (priest) =

Early member of the Church of Jesus Christ of Latter-Day Saints (born c.1775)

Black Pete, or Peter Kerr, was an early member of the Church of Jesus Christ of Latter-day Saints, and the second black man to be ordained to the priesthood in that faith.

== Biography ==
Peter Kerr was born c. 1775, to an enslaved woman named Kino, who was of Mandinka heritage. He and his mother lived in western Pennsylvania, where they were enslaved to a man named John Kerr Jr. Following Kerr's death, Peter was willed to his son, who moved to Ohio, a free state, in 1813. Peter was freed from servitude, and came into contact with a group known as "The Family," which practiced a combination of Christian principles and communism. Many members of that group converted to Mormonism in the early 1830s, including Peter. There is, however, no official record of his baptism, but his membership was recognized by George A. Smith, another member of the church, and in local newspapers. He was notably accustomed to seeing "angels and letters [that] would come down from heaven..." and once jumped off a bridge to catch a letter, which he said was delivered by a black angel. He acted as a Revelator in the community, was ordained to the priesthood, and baptized others into the faith, along with Levi W. Hancock, Edson Fuller, and Herman Bassett. A colleague, Reuben Harmon, mentioned that "White women would chase him about..." and Peter soon entered into a relationship with fourteen-year-old Lovina Williams, of whom he said he had received revelation to marry. Lovina replied that if she received a revelation as well, she would marry him. Peter consulted the prophet Joseph Smith, about whether he should marry Lovina, but Smith said he could not receive personal revelation for him. Peter and Lovina did not marry, and, after 1831, there is no record of him. Some scholars have suggested that he died, being around 60 years old in 1835, when the average lifespan of an African-American man at the time was around forty.

== See also ==
- Walker Lewis
- Green Flake
- Black people and early Mormonism
