= Hark Lay Wales =

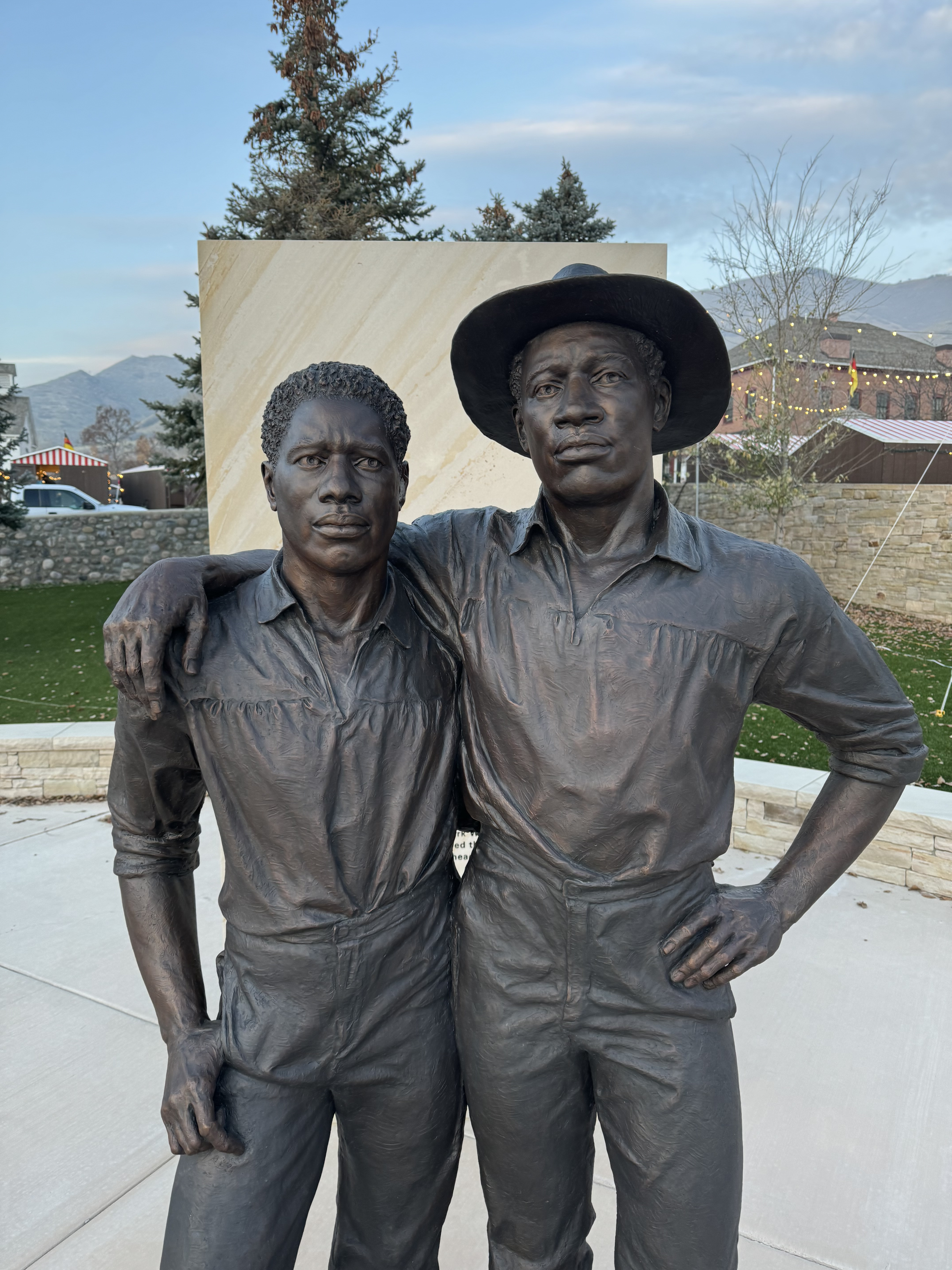
Hark Wales (left) next to his brother Oscar Smith (right) at This is the Place Heritage Park.

Hark Lay Wales, born in Monroe County Mississippi, was one of the few African Americans to cross the Mormon Trail as a pioneer with members of The Church of Jesus Christ of Latter-day Saints. Hark Lay Wales was a hardworking man who helped the Saints (members of the Church of Jesus Christ of Latter-Day Saints) cross the Mormon Trail and arrive in Utah. He acquired his freedom and lived a peaceful life in California until he later returned to Utah. Not much is known about the life of Hark Lay Wales but he was a historic figure for the history of African Americans in the Church of Jesus Christ of Latter-Day Saints.

== Early life and connection to the LDS Church ==
Hark Lay Wales, formerly enslaved to John Jeter Crosby, was given to Crosby's daughter Sytha and her husband William Lay. Hark Lay Wales' first encounter with the Church of Jesus Christ of Latter-Day Saints was in 1839. Missionaries from the Church had much success in spreading their message throughout Monroe County. Records are mixed concerning whether Hark Lay Wales ended up joining the Church. One source says that he was baptized at the Mormon Springs in Mississippi. Yet, there is no record of his baptism in the records of the Church of Jesus Christ of Latter-Day Saints. After the death in 1844 of Joseph Smith Junior, leader of the Church, his successor Brigham Young made efforts to move the members of the Church to the West. William Lay and his family followed the Saints and went out west, taking Hark with them.

== Mormon Trail ==
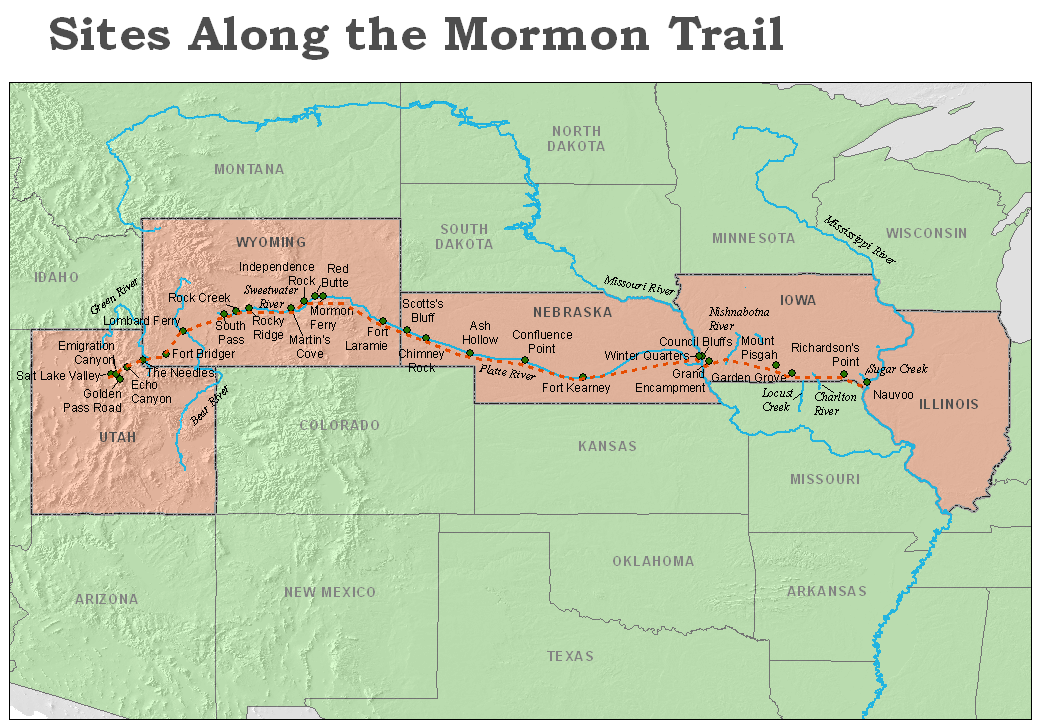
The Mormon Trail travelled by the pioneers of the Church of Jesus Christ of Latter day Saints

In 1846, John Brown received orders from Brigham Young to take the Mississippi Saints to the Platte River trail. Brown managed to persuade a few of the Saints to make the long journey to Independence, Missouri. The company left Monroe County, Mississippi on April 8, 1846. Approximately seven weeks later, the party arrived in Independence, Missouri. When they arrived, they joined another group of migrants, and together they travelled along the Oregon Trail. Yet, the Saints had to hide their identity as "Mormons" due to the severe persecution of their faith at the time. Hark Lay Wales played a vital part in helping the Mississippi Saints on their journey along the treacherous Mormon Trail. The company faced many hardships during their travels to the West. Fortunately, Hark Lay Wales was able to help take care of many livestock, erect buildings, repair wagons, etc. While the company travelled, company leader John Brown had received instructions to go back to Mississippi to gather the rest of the Mississippi Saints, and from there to Winter Quarters, Nebraska. On their journey back to Mississippi, they encountered a group from the Mormon Battalion who had been stricken with an illness. John Brown's group guided the battalion members to where Fort Pueblo was. While the group was preparing to travel back to Winter Quarters, John Brown received instruction from Brigham Young to stay where they were for about a year. Not long after the delay in their travels, Hark Lay Wales and the company finally arrived in Winter Quarters. Hark Lay Wales and other slaves like Oscar Crosby left Winter Quarters and were part of the first company to arrive in Utah. Hark Lay Wales arrived in Utah on July 22, 1847. This historic event marked them as the first African-Americans to arrive in Utah. Shortly after arriving Hark Lay Wales and others settled in a small African-American community near Salt Lake City called Cottonwood, which would later be named Holladay.

== Personal life ==
Hark Lay Wales married another enslaved woman named Nancy, who belonged to the family of George Bankhead. Unfortunately, there were complications and they were forced to separate because William Lay was not able to buy Nancy from the Bankhead family. Hark Lay Wales and Nancy were thought to have had two children together: Howard Egan Wales and Henry. Henry took the last name of Nancy's second husband, James Valentine. After the separation was made, Hark Lay Wales and other slaves travelled to California in 1851. Due to the laws regarding slavery in the new state of California, they were made free, no longer bound to their owners. When this event occurred Hark Lay Wales dropped his previous owners name, Lay, from his own name and changed his name to Hark Wales instead. After arriving in California, he quickly moved to Los Angeles; other than his residency in the city of Los Angeles, not much is known about what he did during his time living there. Twenty years later when he registered to vote, it was recorded that he had moved to San Timoteo Canyon where he worked as a farmer. Within a few years, he returned to Utah in the 1870s and invested in the mining business. He was a share holder in a company called Evergreen Consolidated Mining Company. While Hark Wales does not have a confirmed death date, there is speculation that he died in either 1881, 1887 or 1890. He was buried in the Union Fort Pioneer Cemetery in Cottonwood Heights with an unmarked headstone until 2019.

== Treatment of blacks in Utah and the Church of Jesus Christ of Latter-Day Saints ==
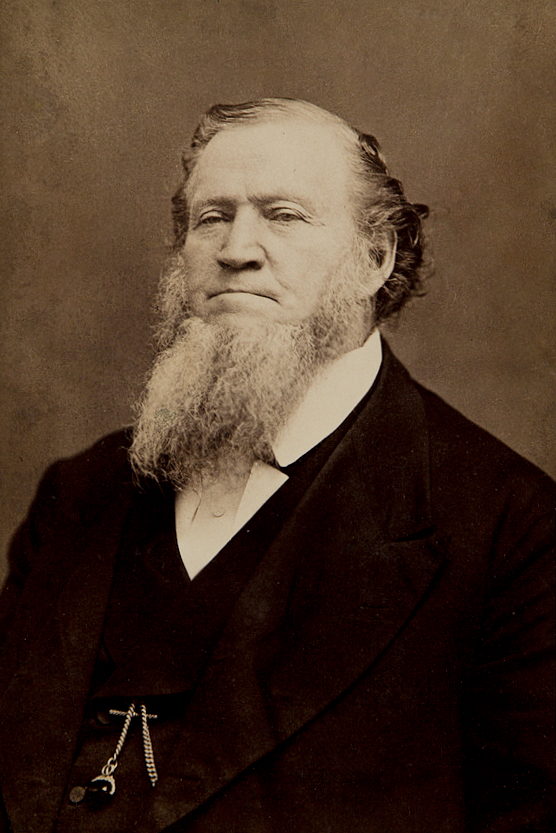
Brigham Young, second prophet of the Church of Jesus Christ of Latter-Day Saints.

Not much is written regarding the direct treatment of Hark Lay Wales or any of the early slaves and freedmen that came to Utah with the pioneers; looking at the general attitudes towards slaves and African Americans in Utah can shed light on how Hark Lay Wales' interactions with the Church may have gone during his time in Utah before moving to California. Joseph Smith Junior, leader of the Church before the treks west, expressed strong sentiments against slavery; he always stood by the fact that he was opposed to slavery as a practice. Moreover, as the Church of Jesus Christ of Latter-Day Saints expanded, Smith also began to voice his support for abolitionist movements for openly, even to the point of including the abolishment of slavery as a key feature of his US presidential campaign in 1844. This may have also played a role in his assassination on June 27th of the same year. While Joseph Smith opposed slavery, he also still believed many racist beliefs of the time regarding people of African descent. Due to the unofficial nature of the statements made by Joseph Smith regarding slavery and race, the future leadership and general membership of the Church of Jesus Christ of Latter-Day Saints were left without a clear guideline regarding slavery and were able to interpret the issue in their own manner. Joseph Smith's unenforced teachings and statements opposing slavery would later be used to justify slavery in the Utah territory. While slavery was permitted in the Utah territory, it was not very common. In 1850, there were only 26 slaves in the Utah Territory. There was legislation restricting the slave trade and also limiting the bringing in of slaves that were already owned prior to entering the territory, meaning that the ownership of slaves remained nonexistent to most Utah residents. By 1850 there were only 12 slave owners on record in the entire territory; it was also encouraged to treat slaves mercifully and to treat them as a human being. Despite the minimal practice of slavery relative to the population of Utah, members of the Church of Jesus Christ of Latter-Day Saints still held mixed views about enslaved African Americans as members of the Church. Shortly after arriving in Utah, Brigham Young instituted a church-wide restriction on the ability of African American men to receive the priesthood and participate in certain ordinances of the faith. This ban officially started in 1852; it limited the ability of African American men to hold any sort of religious office and also prevented them from participating in temple worship, which is seen as the pinnacle of practicing faith within the belief system of the Church of Jesus Christ of Latter-Day Saint. While African American people were allowed to join the Church of Jesus Christ of Latter-Day Saints, they were seen as second-class members due to the beliefs and practices of the time. Some members of the Church applied Biblical stories of a cursed people to those of African descent, justifying the discriminatory behaviors in the Utah territory. This ban was ended in 1978 with a revelation from the prophet and president of the Church, Spencer W. Kimball.

== Legacy ==
Until recently the details of the life of Hark Lay Wales were not known to many people. His name was inscribed on a monument to early pioneers, but not much was known beyond that. He only recently received a marked gravestone in the Union Fort Pioneer Memorial Cemetery in Cottonwood Heights, Utah in 2019. Hark Lay Wales also received his own monument called, Pioneers of 1847 Monument at the "This Is The Place" Heritage Park. He was immortalized together with other fellow slaves: Green Flake, Oscar Crosby and Jane Manning James. Due to research done by descendants of the Crosby-Lay family. Hark Lay Wales was given this marked gravestone to commemorate the efforts that he made to develop Utah in its early years as a territory, by helping others on their pioneer trek across the Midwest, and the development and cultivation of the Salt Lake Valley.
