= Joseph Freeman (Mormon) =

Mormon leader

Joseph Freeman, Jr.
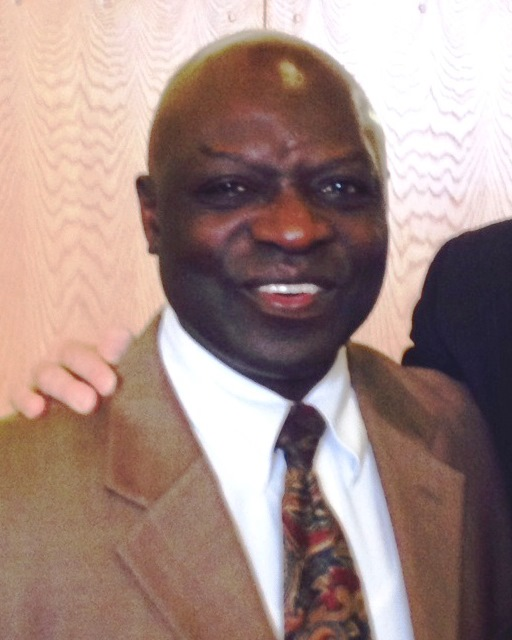
- Born: July 24, 1952 (age 73); Vanceboro, North Carolina, U.S.
- Occupation(s): Religious leader, minister, author

Joseph Freeman Jr. (born July 24, 1952) is the first man of Black African descent to receive the Melchizedek priesthood and be ordained an elder in the Church of Jesus Christ of Latter-day Saints (LDS Church) after the announcement of the 1978 Revelation on Priesthood, which allowed "all worthy male members of the Church" to "be ordained to the priesthood without regard for race or color."

== Biography ==
Freeman was born in Vanceboro, North Carolina, to Rose Lee Smith and Joseph Freeman, Sr. His paternal great-grandparents, William and Ellen Freeman, were slaves in Craven County, North Carolina, who gained their freedom by escaping to Brushton, North Carolina, during the American Civil War, where they received help from Union soldiers until finding land to settle.

At the age of ten, Freeman was baptized and became a member of the Holiness Church, the faith his father's family had supported for at least three generations. After graduating from high school he obtained an evangelist's license fulfilling his childhood dream of becoming a lay minister in the faith.

In 1972, at age 19, Freeman enlisted in the United States Army and was stationed in Hawaii. While in Hawaii he became dissatisfied with the Holiness congregations he attended and began to study other Christian denominations. During this time, he met several people who were Latter-day Saints, including a sergeant in his unit. After several months of studying with LDS Church missionaries, reading the Book of Mormon, and being fully informed of the restriction of priesthood ordination for men of African descent, Freeman stepped down from his role in the Holiness faith and was baptized and confirmed a member of the LDS Church on September 30, 1973. During the period of investigation prior to his baptism he met Toe Isapela Leituala, a Samoan convert to the faith of six years. The two were married on June 15, 1974. In 1975, Freeman left the military and the couple eventually moved to Salt Lake City, Utah.

On June 8, 1978 the LDS Church's First Presidency announced that church president Spencer W. Kimball had received a revelation and that the Lord "has heard our prayers, and ... has confirmed that the long-promised day has come when every faithful, worthy man in the Church may receive the holy priesthood, with power to exercise its divine authority, and enjoy with his loved ones every blessing that flows there from, including the blessings of the temple ... without regard for race or color".

On June 10, 1978, at a stake priesthood meeting, Freeman's name was presented and received unanimous approval for ordination to the Melchizedek priesthood. On June 11, 1978, three days after the announcement of the revelation, Freeman was ordained to the office of elder in the Melchizedek priesthood. The ordination was performed by his bishop, Jay Harold Swain.

Typically, men are ordained to the office of a priest in the Aaronic priesthood approximately one year prior to ordination as an elder in the Melchizedek priesthood. Due to his years of faithfulness and spiritual aptitude, Freeman's ecclesiastical leaders felt that it would be appropriate to ordain him to the office of elder without prior ordination to the Aaronic priesthood. Thus, unlike many men of black African descent who were ordained to the office of priest in the Aaronic priesthood that same day, Freeman is recognized as the first to be ordained an elder as a result of the revelation.

On July 23, 1978, Freeman was sealed to his wife and their two sons, Alexander and Zechariah, in the Salt Lake Temple and thereby became one of the first men of black African descent to receive this ordinance. Thomas S. Monson, then a member of the Quorum of the Twelve Apostles, officiated at the ceremony.

In 1986, Freeman moved to Denver, Colorado, where he was employed as the overseer of maintenance of the LDS Church's Denver Colorado Temple for 15 years. He moved back to Salt Lake City in 2001.

In 1993, Freeman adopted his daughter's son, J.J. Freeman. J.J. lived with Freeman for the next seven years.

After moving back to the Salt Lake Valley in 2001, Freeman served for a time as an LDS Church bishop. In October 2020, Freeman became first counselor in the presidency of the Salt Lake Granger North Stake.

== Publications ==
- Freeman, Joseph Jr. (1979). In the Lord's Due Time. Salt Lake City, Utah: Bookcraft. ISBN 978-0-88494-382-2. OCLC 5800205.

== See also ==
- Elijah Abel
- Black people and Mormonism
- Official Declaration 2
