= Walker Lewis =

African American abolitionist, Freemason, and Mormon elder

Kwaku Walker Lewis

Personal details
- Born: August 3, 1798; Barre, Massachusetts, U.S.
- Died: October 26, 1856 (aged 58); Lowell, Massachusetts, U.S.
- Resting place: Lowell Cemetery
- Spouse(s): Elizabeth Lovejoy
- Children: Enoch Lovejoy Lewis; Lydia Elizabeth Walker; Lucy Minor Lewis; Walker Lovejoy Lewis
- Parents: Peter P. Lewis; Minor Walker

Kwaku Walker Lewis (August 3, 1798 – October 26, 1856), was an early African-American abolitionist, Freemason, and Mormon elder from Massachusetts. He was an active member of the Underground Railroad and the anti-slavery movement.

== Family and personal history ==
Lewis was born on August 3, 1798, in Barre, Massachusetts, to Peter P. Lewis and Minor Walker Lewis. His full name was Kwaku Walker Lewis, named after his maternal uncle, Quock Walker also known as Kwaku Walker. (Kwaku means "boy born on Wednesday" among the Akan people.)

Lewis was one of nine children. He was raised in a prominent middle-class black family that valued education, activism and political involvement. As a young boy, Peter and Minor Lewis moved their family to Cambridge. Walker Lewis was a successful barber who owned residential and commercial buildings in Boston.

In March 1826, Lewis married Elizabeth Lovejoy (the mixed-race daughter of Peter Lovejoy, who was black, and Lydia Greenleaf Bradford, who was white). Their first child, Enoch Lovejoy Lewis, was born on May 20, 1826. Their second, Lydia Elizabeth, would be born the following year in November.

The Lewis family moved to Lowell, where the Industrial Revolution of textile mills brought economic prosperity to the area. In Lowell, together with his brother-in-law John Levy, Lewis opened a barbershop on Merrimack Street. Lewis purchased a two-family home in the Centralville section of Lowell.

== Community activism ==
Lewis and many of his siblings and their families were actively involved in the abolition and equal rights movement throughout Massachusetts and the Northeast.

=== Freemasonry ===
While in Boston, Lewis was initiated into African Freemasonry about 1823, participating in Boston's African Lodge #459 (Prince Hall Freemasonry). In 1825, he became the sixth Master and a year later was its Senior Warden. After the African Lodge declared its independence from the Grand Lodge of London and became its own African Grand Lodge, Walker Lewis was the Grand Master of African Grand Lodge #1 for 1829 and 1830.

=== Massachusetts General Colored Association ===
Around the time of his marriage to Elizabeth Lovejoy in 1826, Lewis and Thomas Dalton helped organize the Massachusetts General Colored Association (MGCA), the first such all-black organization in the United States.

In 1829, the MGCA helped David Walker (no relation) to publish the radical, 76-page Appeal to the Coloured Citizens of the World, which demanded unconditional and immediate emancipation of all slaves in the USA. Lewis arranged for the Boston printer who published the Articles for the African Grand Lodge, to print the controversial Appeal.

=== African Humane Society ===
In 1831, Lewis served as President of the African Humane Society in Boston, which provided funeral expenses for the poor, assisted widows, built the African School in Boston. The African Humane Society also sponsored a "settlement project" for African Americans who wanted to emigrate to settle in Liberia. When the ship sailed in 1813 its manifest contained most of the members of Hiram Lodge No. 3 of Providence, Rhode Island (chartered by Grand Master Prince Hall of African Grand Lodge in 1797).

=== Underground Railroad ===
In Lowell during the 1840s and 1850s, Lewis's home was a stop on the Underground Railroad. For some time, he sheltered fugitive Nathaniel Booth from Virginia, who settled in Lowell in 1844. Until 1850 Booth had a barber shop, but went to Canada after passage of the Fugitive Slave Law of 1850. Later he returned to Lowell.

Walker's son, Enoch ran a used clothing store, mainly to assist escaping slaves to change their appearances with new and better clothing. Walker would cut and style their hair to assist in their disguise.

== Conversion to Mormonism and later life ==
About 1842, Lewis, who had worshipped with the Episcopal Church, converted to the Church of Jesus Christ of Latter Day Saints. He is believed to have been baptized by Parley P. Pratt. One year later, in the summer of 1843, Lewis was ordained an elder by William Smith, brother of founder Joseph Smith. Lewis became the third black man known to hold the Mormon priesthood. (The first two were Elijah Abel and Peter Kerr.)

Walker's first-born son, Enoch Lovejoy Lewis, also joined the church. On September 18, 1846, Enoch married a white Mormon woman, Mary Matilda Webster, in Cambridge.

=== Bans against African Americans ===
After settling in the Salt Lake Valley in 1848, Brigham Young announced a ban that prohibited all men of black African descent from holding the priesthood. In addition, he prohibited Mormons of African descent from participating in Mormon temple rites, such as the endowment or sealing. These racial restrictions remained in place until 1978, when the policy was rescinded by church president Spencer W. Kimball.

=== Attempt to live in Utah ===
Walker Lewis migrated to Utah to be with the main body of members of the Church of Jesus Christ of Latter-day Saints. He left Massachusetts at the end of March 1851 and arrived in Salt Lake City about October 1. There he received his patriarchal blessing from Presiding Patriarch John Smith, an uncle of Joseph Smith. He asked Jane Elizabeth Manning James, a black Mormon from Connecticut, to marry him as his polygamous wife, but she declined.

Two months after Walker's arrival, Brigham Young lobbied for, and the Utah Territorial Legislature (composed only of high-ranking Mormon leaders) passed, the Act in Relation to Service. This new territorial law made slavery legal in the territory of Utah, and Section Four of the statute provided punishment for "any white person ... guilty of sexual intercourse with any of the African race," regardless of their being married, consenting adults. The anti-miscegenation law was not repealed in Utah until the 1960s.

Walker Lewis left Utah after six months the following spring, returning to Lowell. His daughter-in-law Mary Matilda Webster Lewis subsequently died from "exhaustion" just after Christmas 1852 in the State Hospital at Worcester. His son, the widower Enoch Lewis, married the African-American Elisa Richardson Shorter in 1853.

Lewis died on October 26, 1856, in Lowell of tuberculosis.

== See also ==
- Black Mormons
- Black people and the Latter Day Saint movement
- Quock Walker
- Elijah Abel
