= Joseph T. Ball =

Branch president
- October 7, 1844 – March 1, 1845
- Called by: Joseph Smith

Personal details
- Born: February 21, 1804; Cambridge, Massachusetts, US
- Died: September 20, 1861 (aged 57); Boston, Massachusetts, US

Joseph T. Ball (February 21, 1804 – September 20, 1861) was an early convert (and later excommunicated member) of the Church of Jesus Christ of Latter-day Saints and a Black man who held the priesthood prior to the priesthood ban instituted in 1849. He was also the first Black branch president in the church.

== Early life ==
Joseph T. Ball was born on February 21, 1804, to Mary Montgomery Drew and Joseph T. Ball, Sr., in Cambridge, Massachusetts. His father was an immigrant from Jamaica, and his mother was a white woman native to Massachusetts. They had 6 children together. Ball's parents did not marry until after they had had children, possibly because interracial marriage was illegal in Massachusetts at the time. Ball's family was said to have been very dedicated to social activism, his father founding a local society to help black widows, and his siblings becoming abolitionists and suffragists. All of Ball's sisters were members of the Boston Female Anti-Slavery Society. Ball's father died before Ball was introduced to Mormonism.

Ball was trained and worked as a cooper.

== Racial identity ==
Historical records do not agree on Ball's race as his official racial identification changed over time. It is assumed that Ball's father was black and is known that his mother was white. Despite being a multiracial family, in the 1810 and 1820 US census, Ball's family was classified as "not white." Specifically in the 1820 census, Ball's family was listed as "Free Colored Persons." However, by 1830, the Ball family was passing as white. The 1830 census records the family as being white with one member of the family (assumedly Ball's father) as not white. Passing as white allowed the Ball family to live in white society without others knowing their racial history. One record shows one of Ball's sisters being recognized as "slightly colored" during an anti-slavery convention, but another record shows both of Ball's sisters as "two white young ladies." There is also no evidence that people who knew Ball, specifically fellow members of the church, recognized Ball as anything but white. In official church records, Ball is not listed as "colored." According to Jeffery D. Mahas, the fact that there are very few sources of people recognizing Ball and his family as black or multiracial point to their success of joining the white community and being seen as white. Ball's death certificate classifies him as white.

== Membership in the church ==
Ball was baptized into the church during the summer of 1832. Records disagree on who baptized Ball, but he was most likely baptized by Brigham Young, Joseph Young, Orson Hyde, or Samuel Smith. The following year, Ball moved to Kirtland, Ohio with other members of the church (arriving at least by September 1833). During a church meeting on March 17, 1836, Ball was suggested as a candidate to become an Elder in the church. However, the conference decided against Ball becoming an elder for reasons unknown.

In January 1838, Ball served a mission with Wilford Woodruff in the Fox Islands in Maine. According to Mahas, Ball must have been ordained an elder at this time as that is a prerequisite to being a missionary in the church. Three months after the start of his mission, Ball returned to Massachusetts to see his mother, most likely following the death of his father. Ball continued acting as a missionary for the next few years, preaching in New England. During his mission, Ball and his companions were able to baptize at least 50 people, including noted overland pioneer William Willard Hutchings.

In 1841, Ball moved to Nauvoo, Illinois with many other members. There, he was baptized for the dead on behalf of his father, sister, and a friend and received a patriarchal blessing from William Smith (brother of church founder Joseph Smith). Ball also received another mission call to South America, however he never served that mission. However, Ball did continue to preach in Ohio.

During his time as a missionary in Ohio, Ball became involved with Sam Brannan, a missionary preaching in the same area. Together with Brannan, William Smith, and George J. Adams (all of whom were missionaries for church at the time), Ball began to collect and keep money from members of the church in areas he was preaching. At the same time, the group taught the concept of "spiritual wife claims" which was loosely based on polygamy. Woodruff found out about what Ball was preaching about sexual practices contrary to church doctrine and he reported that "Elder Ball tries to sleep with [girls and women] when he can." The church unsuccessfully attempted to regain some of the money that Ball had taken According to a podcast by Lindsay Hansen Park, Ball never married but attempted to seduce white Mormon women.

Despite Ball's reported misconduct, he was not immediately excommunicated from the church. From October 7, 1844 to February 1845, Ball served as a branch president of a congregation of the church in Boston, which at the time was the largest congregation of the church outside of Nauvoo. Most likely during this time, Ball was ordained to the title of a High Priest by Smith. Ball is reported to be the first African American High Priest of the church. The following year, in spring 1845, after being released from his calling, he was asked to work on the construction of the Nauvoo Temple by Parley P. Pratt.

Eventually, Ball was excommunicated from the church for practicing and teaching sexual practices contrary to church doctrine.

== Later life ==
After Ball left the church, he and William both became involved in the Strangite sect, appearing in their records in 1848. He migrated back to Massachusetts near the end of his life, where he died of tuberculosis on September 20, 1861. He is buried in Mount Auburn Cemetery near Boston.
