= Green Flake =

Early African American LDS pioneer (1828–1903)

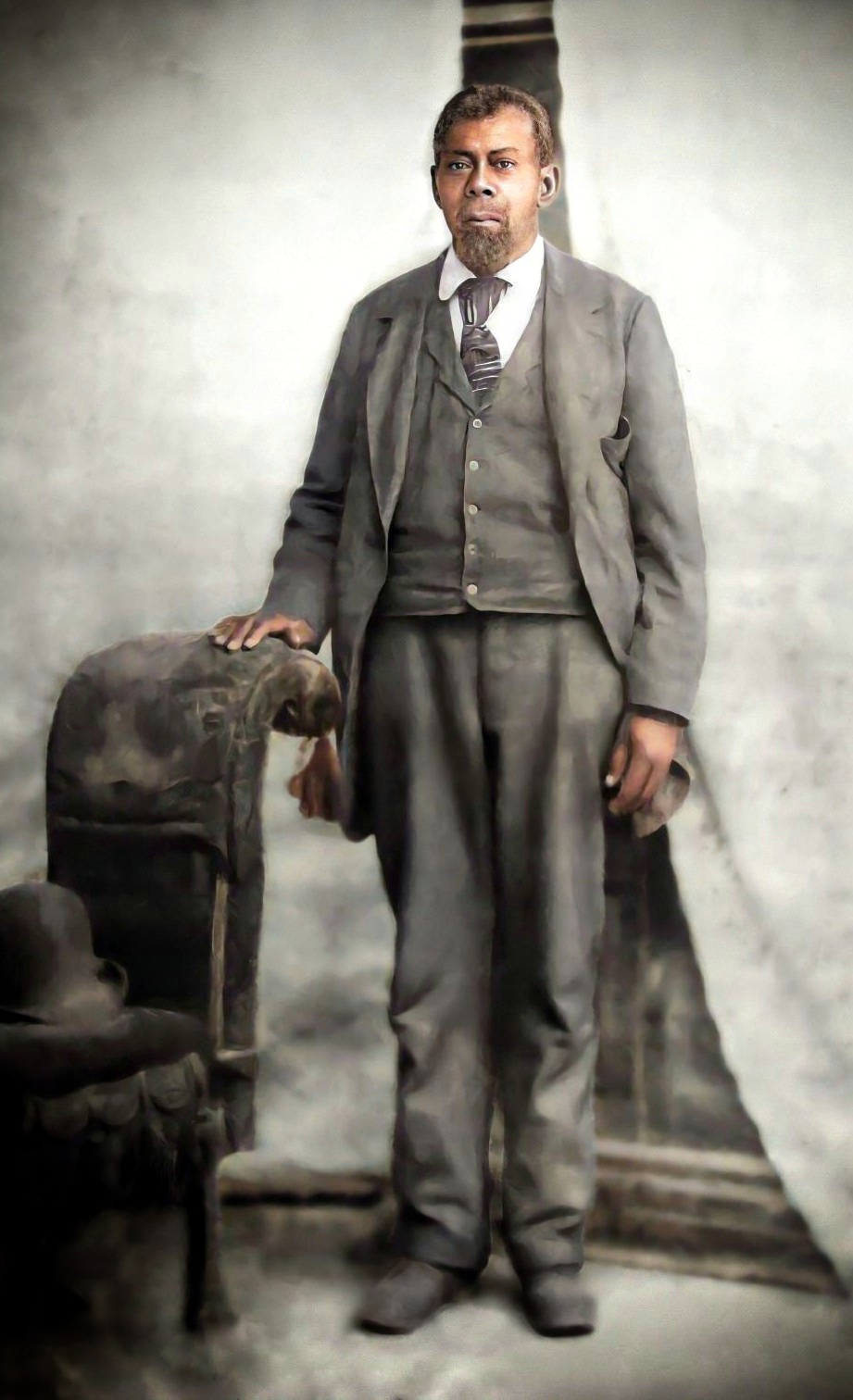
- Artistic enhancement and colorization of Flake's portrait taken around the 1890s.

Personal details
- Born: January 6, 1828; North Carolina, US
- Died: October 20, 1903 (aged 75); Gray's Lake, Idaho
- Resting place: Union Cemetery, Cottonwood Heights, Utah
- Spouse(s): Martha Crosby
- Children: 2

Green Flake (January 6, 1828 – October 20, 1903) was an early African-American member of the Church of Jesus Christ of Latter Day Saints, and was one of the three enslaved African-American Latter-day Saint pioneers who entered the Salt Lake Valley on July 22, 1847. He was born into bondage on a plantation in Anson County, North Carolina. His enslaver, James Flake, took him to Mississippi in the early 1840s. There, James, his wife, and Green joined the Church of Jesus Christ of Latter Day Saints in 1844. The Flakes moved to Nauvoo, Illinois, in 1845. Green Flake received his freedom sometime in the early 1850s and married Martha Morris. Green and Martha had two children together.

== Biography ==
Green Flake was born a slave on the Jordan Flake Plantation in Anson County, North Carolina. James and Agnes Flake took him when they moved from North Carolina to Mississippi a few years later. In the winter of 1843–1844, the Flakes were converted by Benjamin L. Clapp, a missionary from the Church of Jesus Christ of Latter Day Saints. Green was baptized on April 7, 1844.

=== Life in Nauvoo ===
In 1845 the Flakes moved to Nauvoo, Illinois, in order to be closer to the main body of Latter Day Saints. William Jordan Flake, eldest son of James and Agnes, remembered "being taken to the top of the Nauvoo Temple by our Negro servant Green, and viewing the surrounding country for miles in every direction." Green Flake was a part of the first group of Latter Day Saints to leave Nauvoo for the West and participated in the initial establishment of Winter Quarters, Nebraska.

=== Moving West ===
Green was sent by James Flake to take some mules and a carriage, cross the plains with the first company of Saints, and remain out west to build a house for the Flake family in preparation for their arrival. Brigham Young's advance company for the westward trek of the Saints began on April 17, 1847. Oscar Crosby and Hark Lay were other slaves on the overland journey. On July 13, 1847, Brigham Young sent Orson Pratt and others, including Flake, to prepare the way into Salt Lake. This vanguard group reached the valley on July 22, 1847.

Green was re-baptized on August 8, 1847, by Tarleton Lewis and confirmed the same day by Wilford Woodruff; many Latter-day Saints were rebaptized when they reached the Salt Lake Valley to show their commitment to the faith. Upon his arrival in the Salt Lake Valley, Green built a log cabin in Cottonwood (now known as Holladay, Utah), and planted crops as James Flake had required him.

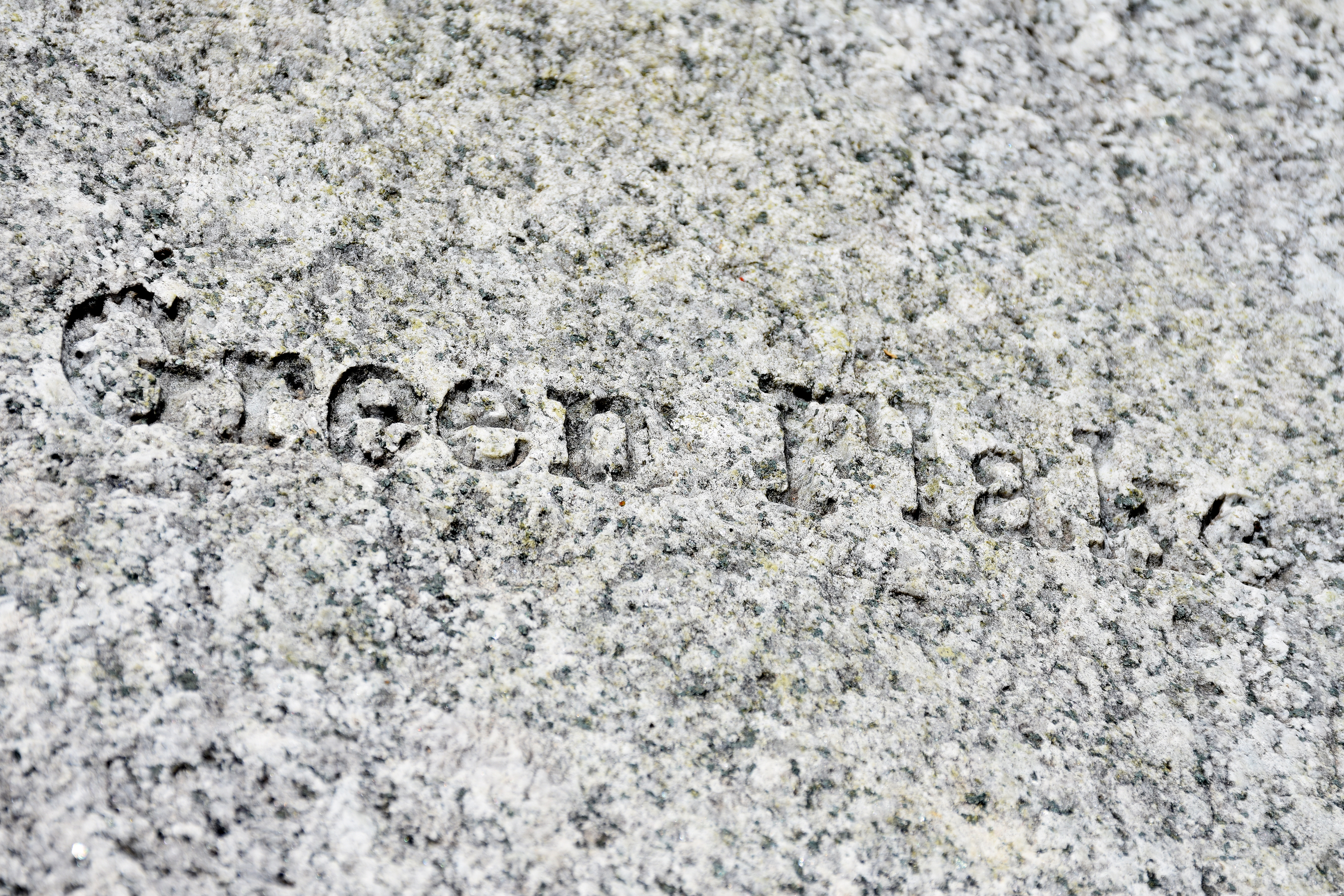
Flake's name as engraved on a boulder at First Encampment Park

=== Slave status ===
In 1854, Amasa Lyman, a church leader in California, wrote a letter to Brigham Young on behalf of Agnes Flake, asking for Young to send "the negro man she left" so Agnes Flake could sell him. Brigham Young responded that Green was in poor health and was needed in Utah to provide for his own family. Green, Martha, and their children were listed as free residents of Union, Salt Lake County, in the 1860 census. In his dissertation on the history of Black people in Utah, Ronald Gerald Coleman states that Brigham Young freed Flake. Writing for the LDS Church History Department, Jonathan Stapley and Amy Thiriot wrote that Flake "may have considered himself freed when James Madison Flake died in 1850". Green moved to Union, near the mouth of Big Cottonwood Canyon, in 1856. Slavery in Utah was not officially banned until the spring of 1862.

=== Personal life ===
Green Flake married Martha Morris, possibly in 1852. Martha was born in Mississippi in 1828, the daughter of Vilate, and arrived in Utah in 1848. She was the half-sister of Oscar Crosby and Hark Lay. They had two children: Lucinda Vilate, born December 2, 1854, who married George Stevens in 1872, and Abraham, born in 1857 and married to Mary Steele. Martha Flake died January 20, 1885. After her death Green moved to Gray's Lake, Idaho. Green Flake carved the gravestone for Martha's grave, which bears the inscription "In my father's house are many mansions." Green Flake died in Idaho on October 20, 1903. He was buried in the Union Cemetery in Cottonwood Heights, Utah, next to his wife.

In 1851, after James Flake's death, William Crosby wrote in a letter to Brigham Young that Green was a "Lying disafected Saucy to Brother Flakes wife [sic]". An article on the Pioneer Day celebrations in Salt Lake City noted his presence there, describing him as "a vigorous, broad-shouldered, good-natured, bright old gentleman."

== Legacy ==
One of Flake's descendants was Lucille Bankhead, a civil rights activist in Utah and the first Relief Society president of the Genesis Group.

Black Pioneer is a 2020 biopic.
