= Interracial marriage and the LDS Church =

Race relationships in Mormonism

In the past, leaders of the Church of Jesus Christ of Latter-day Saints (LDS Church), including Brigham Young, have opposed marriages between members of different ethnicities.

In 1977, one of the church's apostles, Boyd K. Packer, publicly stated: "We've always counseled in the Church for our Mexican members to marry Mexicans, our Japanese members to marry Japanese, our Caucasians to marry Caucasians, our Polynesian members to marry Polynesians... The counsel has been wise." According to historian Lester E. Bush Jr., nearly every decade for over a century—beginning with the church's formation in the 1830s until the 1970s—has seen some denunciations of interracial marriages (miscegenation), with most statements focusing on Black–White marriages.

Church president Brigham Young taught on multiple occasions that Black–White marriage merited death for the couple and their children. Early church leaders made an exception to the interracial marriage ban by allowing White LDS men to marry Native American women, because Native Americans were viewed as being descended from the Israelites. Church leaders did not sanction White LDS women marrying Native American men, however.

In 2013, the LDS Church disavowed the teachings that interracial marriage was a sin. Until at least the 1960s, the LDS Church penalized some White members who married Black individuals by prohibiting both spouses from entering its temples. After the temple and priesthood ban was lifted for Black members in 1978, the church started allowing Black interracial temple marriages, but still officially discouraged marriages across ethnic lines. Until 2013, at least one official church manual in use continued discouraging interracial marriages. Past teachings of church leaders on race and interracial marriage have stemmed from racist beliefs of the time and have seen criticism and controversy.

== Utah's legislation on interracial relationships ==
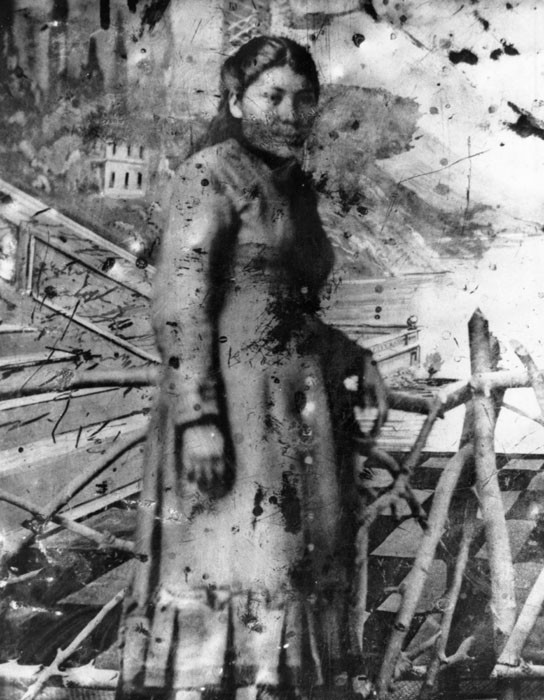
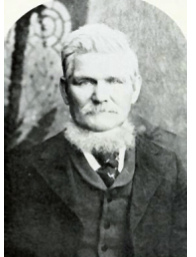
Utah law never prohibited interracial marriage between Native Americans and White people unlike many other states. This allowed Native American Jeanette Smith (left) to marry the LDS, European American Dudley Leavitt in 1860.

Past church leaders' views on interracial marriages were reflected by previous laws in Utah, where its members held a notable amount of political influence. In 1852, the Act in Relation to Service which allowed the enslavement of Black people in Utah Territory was passed, and it also banned sexual intercourse between a White person and "any of the African race." That same day the Act for the relief of Indian Slaves and Prisoners (which allowed White Utah residents to enslave Native Americans) also passed, though it did not contain any discussion on Native-White marriage or sex. In 1888, the government of Utah Territory (with an approximately 80% LDS population) passed an anti-miscegenation law. The law prohibited marriages between a "negro" or "mongolian" (i.e. ethnically Asian person) and a "white person". In 1890, Black individuals made up less than 0.3% of Utah's population of 210,000, Chinese individuals made up less than 0.4%, and Native Americans made up 1.6%. In 1939, the two-thirds-Mormon majority Utah State Legislature expanded the law to prohibit a White person from marrying a "Mongolian, a member of the malay race or a mulatto, quadroon, or octoroon." Unlike laws in other states, Utah's law did not prohibit marriages between White people and Native American people. Utah's 1852 ban on most interracial marriages remained until it was repealed over a century later by its legislature in 1963.

== Interracial marriages with Native Americans ==
Mormons considered Native Americans to be a higher race than Black people, based on their belief that Native Americans were descendants of the biblical Israelites, and they also believed that through intermarriage, the skin color of Native Americans could be restored to a "white and delightsome" state. On July 17, 1831, church founder Joseph Smith said he received a revelation in which God wanted several early elders of the church to eventually marry Native American women in a polygamous relationship so their posterity could become "white, delightsome, and just."

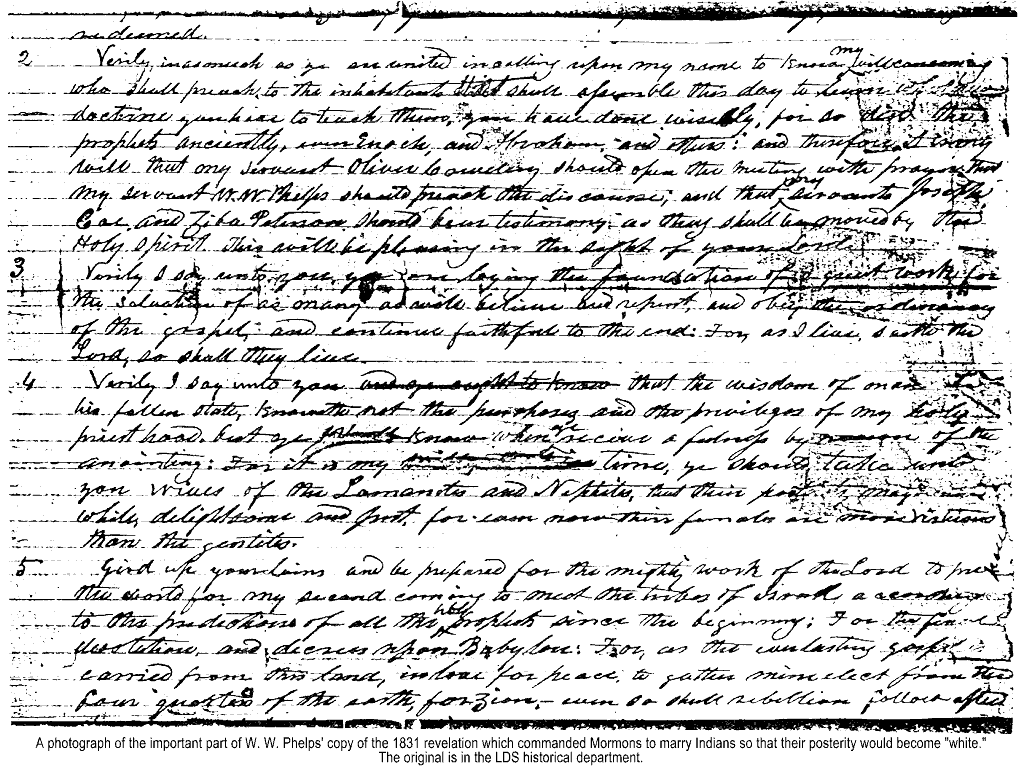
The 1831 transcript of a revelation by Joseph Smith approving marriages between church members and Native Americans, stating "For it is my will, that in time, ye should take unto you wives of the Lamanites and Nephites, that their posterity may become white, delightsome and Just, for even now their females are more virtuous than the gentiles."

Though Smith's main successor Young he believed that Native American peoples were "degraded", and "fallen in every respect, in habits, custom, flesh, spirit, blood, desire", he permitted Mormon men to marry Native American women as part of a process that would make Native people white and delightsome and restore them to their "pristine beauty" within a few generations. However, Native American men were prohibited from marrying White women in Mormon communities.

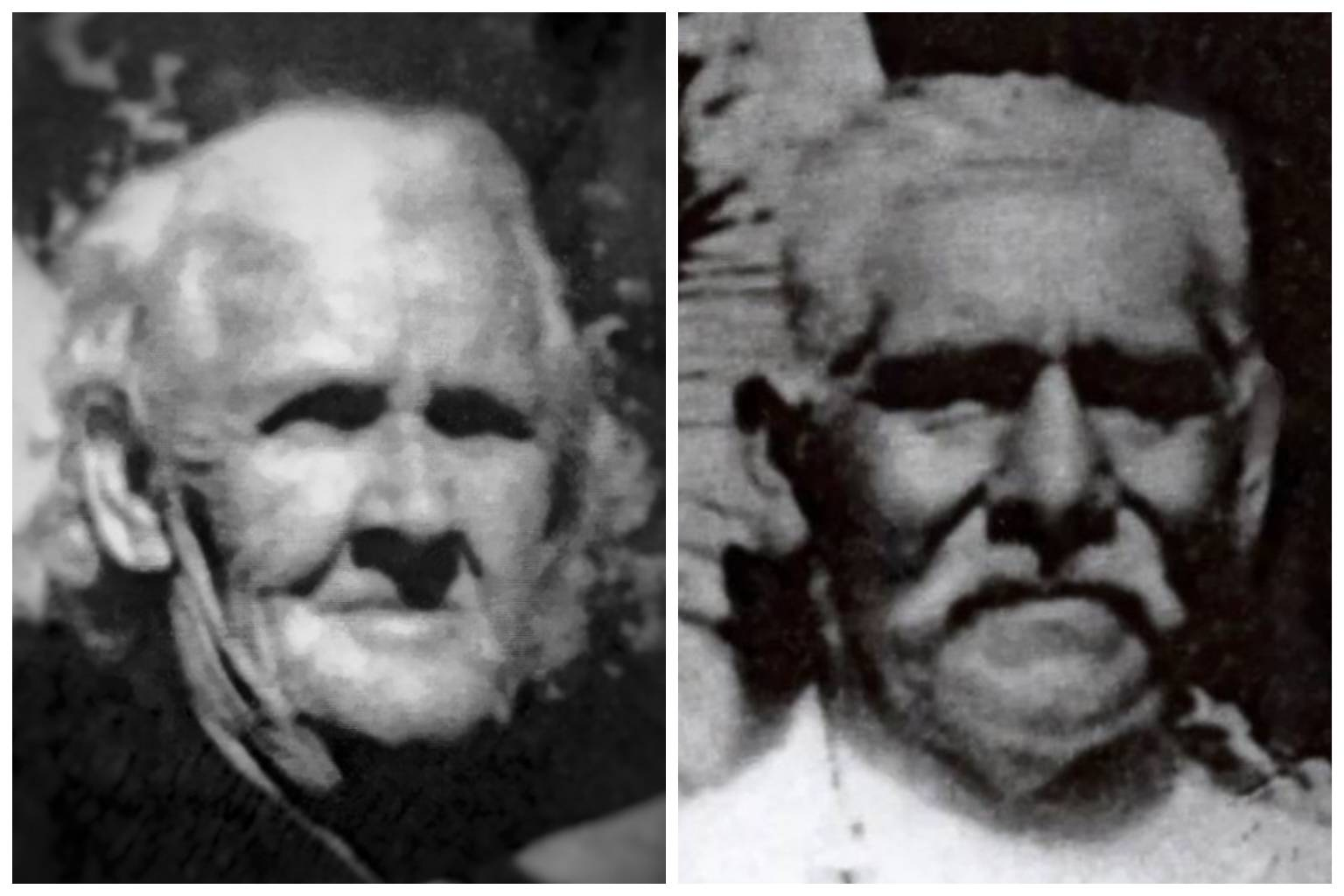
An example of Native-White interracial marriage in the LDS community was Utah couple Caroline Josephine Neilson (left) and David Lemmon, shown here circa mid-1920s.

Young performed the first recorded sealing ceremony between a "Lamanite" and a White member in October 1845 when an Oneida man Lewis Dana and Mary Gont were sealed in the Nauvoo Temple. There is evidence that Young may have married his Bannock servant Sally. Sally later married Ute chief Kanosh. By 1870 only about 30 White, Mormon men had Native American wives, and few additional interracial marriages with Native Americans occurred. Later church leaders taught Native American skins would be lightened through some other method, and under the presidency of Spencer W. Kimball, the church began officially discouraging any White-Native interracial marriages.

== In canonized scripture ==
=== The Book of Mormon ===
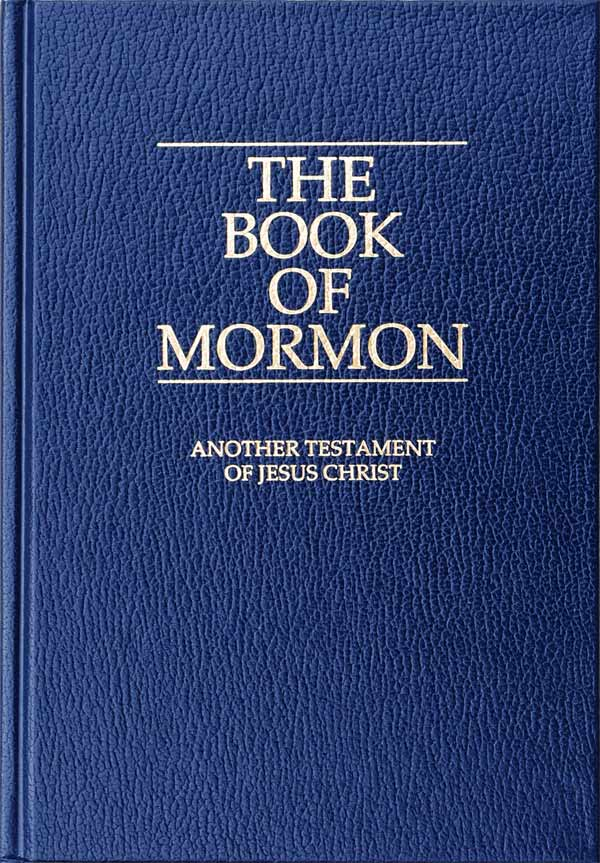
In The Book of Mormon one group of lighter-skinned people was commanded by God not to intermarry with a darker-skinned group.

In the Book of Mormon, the Lord cursed the Lamanites, and as a sign of the curse their skin was marked with blackness. The black marking was made so that the Nephites would not find the Lamanites "enticing", so "that they [the Nephites] might not mix [with Lamanites] and believe in incorrect traditions", and so they would remain a separate people. If a Nephite intermarried and had children with a Lamanite, the Lord also cursed and marked them, and cursed their descendants.

Hugh Nibley, a prominent Mormon apologist, argued that the curse could be thought of as traditions inconsistent with God's commandments. He also posited the curse did not spread through interracial reproduction, but that by intermarrying Nephites would participate in Lamanite traditions, so God placed the mark to prevent the spread of Lamanite culture among the Nephites. The Book of Mormon Seminary Teacher Manual used to teach seminary students about the Book of Mormon, quotes apostle Joseph Fielding Smith as stating that the skin color was changed to "keep the two peoples from mixing".

=== The Pearl of Great Price ===
In the Book of Abraham in the Pearl of Great Price, the name of Ham's wife is Egyptus, which is given the meaning of forbidden. It teaches that their grandson, Pharaoh, was a descendant of the Canaanites (Abraham 1:22), a race of people who had been cursed with black skin for committing genocide against "the people of Shum". W. W. Phelps, an early church leader, taught that Ham himself was cursed because he had married a Black wife. In The Way to Perfection, apostle Joseph Fielding Smith quoted B. H. Roberts in pointing out that Egyptus means forbidden, and suggests that might be because she was "of a race with which those who held the priesthood were forbidden to intermarry."

=== The Bible ===
In Genesis Isaac commands Jacob not to marry the Canaanites. The Old Testament Student Manual, which is the manual currently used to study the Bible's Old Testament in church Institutes of Religion, teaches that Ham's sons were denied the priesthood because he had married Egyptus. It also states it is because "a daughter of Canaan would not be worthy to join Jacob in entering into a marriage covenant with the Lord." In Deuteronomy, the Israelites were commanded not to marry the Canaanites. In 1954, apostle Mark E. Petersen used this as an example of why the church did not allow interracial marriages. Another example of intermarriage in the Bible is that from the book of Judges in which Samson marries a Philistine woman. The LDS Old Testament Seminary Teacher Manual teaches that marrying a Philistine was against the will of God.

== 19th-century teachings on Black–White marriages ==
=== Joseph Smith ===
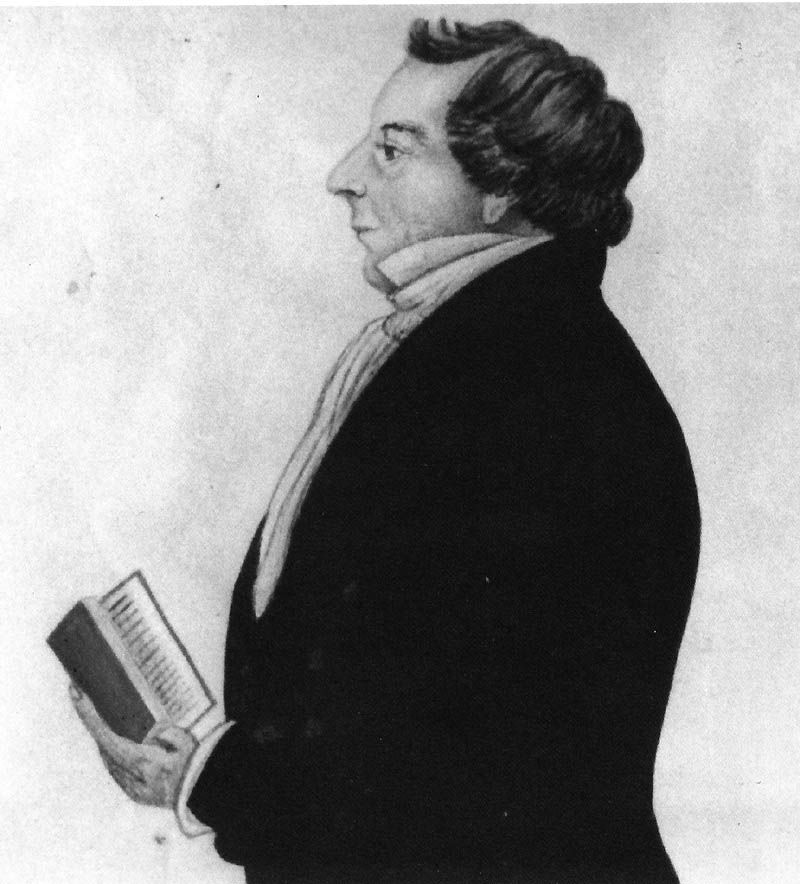
Joseph Smith expressed opposition to White-Black marriages, but endorsed polygamous marriage between White Mormon men and Native American women.

In 1843 church founder Joseph Smith wrote, "Had I [anything] to do with the Negro I would confine them by strict [l]aw to their own species," in reference to interracial marriage. A year later as mayor of Nauvoo, Illinois, he held a trial and fined two Black men the modern equivalent of thousands of dollars for trying to marry White women. A decade earlier hundreds of non-Mormon citizens of Jackson County, Missouri accused the LDS community of inviting Black people to live among them, thus, creating the risk of interracial marriage. Critics cited this as a reason for demanding the removal of Mormon people from the state. The apostle Parley P. Pratt denied this invitation had taken place, however.

There are other records of Smith's teaching on interracial marriage. For example, in 1897 First Presidency member George Q. Cannon wrote in his journal that Joseph Smith had taught a later president of the church, John Taylor, that a White man married to a woman with Black ancestry could not receive the priesthood, and that they both would be killed along with any of their children if the penalty of the law were executed. Three years later Cannon also stated that Smith had taught Taylor that any male child born with any Black heritage from one or more parents could not receive the priesthood as he was "tainted with Negro blood." In 1908, church president Joseph F. Smith stated the church founder had declared the priesthood ordination of Elijah Abel as void as he had a Black great-grandparent due to a mixed-race marriage. Abel was referred to as an octoroon man at the time for his one-eighth Black heritage. Abel's petitions for temple ordinances were also denied by Smith's next successors Brigham Young and John Taylor because of his Black ancestor.

=== Brigham Young ===
On at least three occasions (1847, 1852, and 1865) Smith's successor Brigham Young publicly taught that the punishment for Black–White interracial marriages was death, and the killing of a Black–White interracial couple and their children as part of a blood atonement would be a blessing to them. He further stated that interracial children are sterile "like a mule", a teaching later repeated in a church magazine. Young taught that the moment the church consents to White members having children with Black individuals the church would go to destruction, and that, "Any man having one drop of the seed of Cain in him cannot hold the priesthood." Young also taught that a White person who had children with a Black person would be cursed to the priesthood.

Similar to honor killings as well as a form of human sacrifice, blood atonement is the belief that Jesus' atonement for humanity's sins does not apply to some sins, such as interracial sexual activity and marriage, because they are too serious. To atone for these sins, their perpetrators should be killed in a way that allows their blood to be shed upon the ground as a sacrificial offering. This doctrine was most widely taught during the Mormon Reformation. Examples of how Young applied his teaching of it with regard to interracial relationships are as follows:

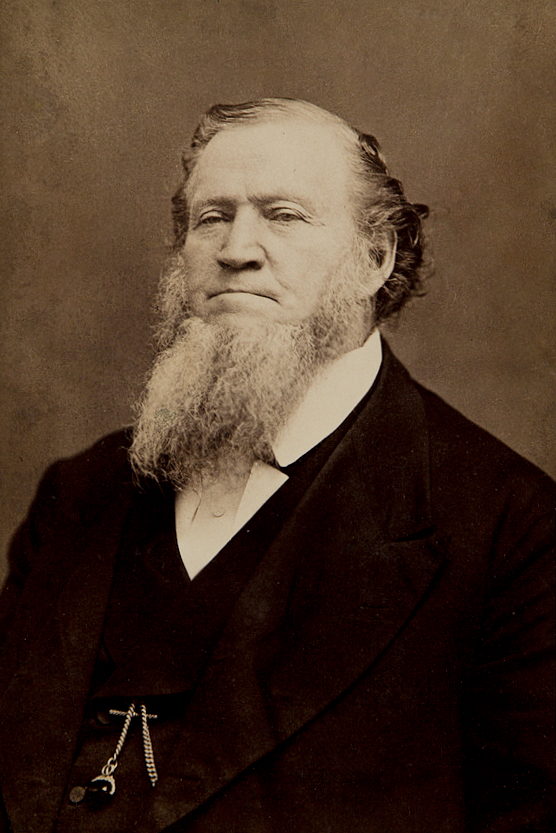
Brigham Young publicly taught several times that the punishment for Black and White interracial marriages was death.

- 1847 — Young heard of a Mormon family composed of a Black man Enoch Lovejoy Lewis (son of ordained priesthood holder Kwaku Walker Lewis), a White woman Mary Matilda Webster, and their interracial child living in Massachusetts and responded that if the family wasn't living so close to non-Mormons "they would all have to be killed" since the law is that Black and White seed should not be "amalgamated".
- 1852 — As territory governor, Young stated before the territory legislature that if a White man had children with a Black woman, he should request to have his head chopped off. He continued saying that if someone were to kill the man, woman and any children of such a union, that it would be a blessing to them and "it would do a great deal towards atoning for the sin".
- 1865 — In a speech in the Salt Lake Tabernacle Young repeated the teaching of death as punishment for Black and White individuals producing interracial offspring, stating the penalty would always be in place.

==== Interracial marriages of William McCary ====
In 1847, former slave and Mormon convert William McCary drew the ire of Brigham Young and others in Nauvoo for his marriage to a White woman, Lucy Stanton, and his later alleged mixed-race polygamous sealings to additional White women without church authorization. McCary stated he had Native American heritage in order to marry Stanton and avoid the greater stigma that the few Black people in Nauvoo faced. The most common interpretation of the events around McCary and his excommunication is that they contributed to or precipitated the subsequent ban of Black members from temple ordinances and priesthood authority. McCary elicited the first recorded general authority statement connecting race and priesthood restriction when the apostle Parley Pratt referred to him as the "black man who has got the blood of Ham in him which linege [sic] was cursed as regards the priesthood."

==== Lynching of Thomas Coleman ====
In 1866, Thomas Coleman, a Black member of the LDS Church, was murdered in Salt Lake City after it was discovered he was courting a White woman. His throat was slit so deeply from ear to ear that he was nearly decapitated, and his right breast was slit open, similar to the penalties simulated in the temple endowment and taught by Brigham Young. He was also castrated and his killer(s) pinned a note warning Black men to stay away from White women to his chest. Historian D. Michael Quinn stated that this murder was a fulfillment of Young's 1852 teaching that the penalty for mixed-ethnic marriage was decapitation. The LDS apologetics organization FAIR argued that Coleman's death may have been unrelated to Young's teachings or temple penalties, since Coleman was not an endowed church member.

=== Under Wilford Woodruff ===
In the late 1800s at least two White members were denied church ordinances after marrying a Black person. In 1895, a White woman was denied a temple sealing to her White husband because she had previously married a Black man, even though she had since divorced him. First Presidency member George Q. Cannon argued that allowing her access to the temple would not be fair to her two, multi-ethnic daughters, whom she'd had with her former husband. Cannon recorded in his journal having stated in 1881 that when it came to the important question of interracial marriage, Mormons believed against "intermarriage with inferior races, particularly the negro." A White man was denied the priesthood in 1897 because he had married a Black woman, though, then senior apostle Lorenzo Snow stated the man would be eligible if he divorced his wife and married a White woman. In 1899 a White woman Caroline Amelia Bailey and her Black husband Elijah A. Banks were baptized into the LDS Church in Minneapolis. They would later be denied temple ordinances and Banks priesthood ordination in 1910.

== 1900–1950 teachings ==
=== George Q. Cannon ===
In 1900, George Q. Cannon, first counselor in the First Presidency under Lorenzo Snow, repeated Young's teachings that if a priesthood-holding man married a Black woman, then according to God's law, the man and any offspring should be killed so the seed of Cain would not receive the priesthood. That same year a Black man John Wesley Harmon Jr. and his wife Lilian Blanche Clark, a daughter of a Nanticoke chief, joined an LDS congregation in Delaware.

=== Under Joseph F. Smith (1901—1918) ===
A Southern states mission president German Ellsworth was worried about the presence of Black-White marriages like the Banks' and instructed his missionaries around 1902 to stop working among Black people as he stated the presence of Black members and interracial couples slowed the recruitment of White people. As church president Joseph F. Smith declared in 1907 that anyone with "negro blood" to any "remote a degree" was "deprived of the rights of the priesthood because of the decree of the Almighty." John Wesley Harmon was told in a 1911 letter from the First Presidency Smith that his appeal for ordination to the priesthood was denied citing the "curse of Ham". He left the LDS Church shortly after.

==== Rudger Clawson ====
In 1903 the Quorum of the Twelve and First Presidency denied a temple sealing to a man with one Black great-grandparent. The apostle Rudger Clawson recorded that the man was "tainted with negro blood". A few days after the decision Clawson stated in a stake conference that the White members should be glad to be "wellborn" so they can have the blessings of the temple and referenced the young man who was denied a temple marriage as he was one-eighth Black and "tainted with the blood of Cain". Clawson later lamented in a meeting that the man's white father of "pure parentage" had brought a curse upon his posterity by marrying a woman with a Black grandparent.

==== B. H. Roberts ====
Some other early-20th-century teachings on the subject include the highly influential 1907 Deseret News five-volume book series The Seventy's Course in Theology by church seventy and prominent Mormon theologian B. H. Roberts. In it Roberts dedicates an entire lesson of the first volume to the "Negro Race Problem", and approvingly quoted a Southern author who stated that a social divide between White and Black people should be maintained at all costs as socializing would lead to mixed-race marriages with an inferior race, and no disaster would compare to this mixing as it would doom the Caucasian race. The lesson cited multiple biological justifications such as craniology (phrenology) to defend banning Black–White "commingling". Additionally, a 1913 church publication in the church's Young Woman's Journal encouraged young women to maintain White racial purity and health by avoiding "race disintegration" and "race suicide" through interracial reproduction.

=== J. Reuben Clark ===
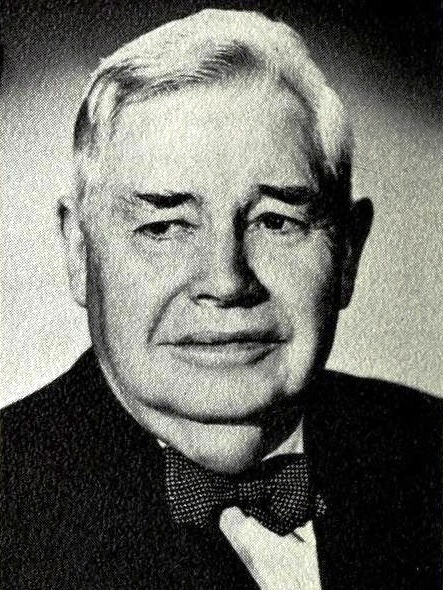
The apostle Reuben Clark spoke against mixed-race marriage several times in the 1940s, once calling it a "wicked virus."

First Presidency member J. Reuben Clark told top leaders of the church's Young Women in 1946 that, "It is sought today in certain quarters to break down all race prejudice, and at the end of the road ... is intermarriage. ...[D]o not ever let that wicked virus get into your systems that brotherhood either permits or entitles you to mix races which are inconsistent. Biologically, it is wrong; spiritually, it is wrong." The quote was reprinted in the church's official Improvement Era magazine. Three years later as senior vice-president of the church-owned Hotel Utah which then banned Black people, Clark stated that the hotel's ban was in place to prevent interracial socializing that could hurt church leaders' efforts "to preserve the purity of the race that is entitled to hold the priesthood" and that the church taught White members to avoid social interaction with Black people.

=== Under George Albert Smith ===
In 1947, the First Presidency, headed by George Albert Smith, sent a response letter to a California stake president inquiring on the subject stating, "Social intercourse between the Whites and the Negroes should certainly not be encouraged because of leading to intermarriage, which the Lord has forbidden. ... [T]rying to break down social barriers between the Whites and the Blacks is [a move] that should not be encouraged because inevitably it means the mixing of the races if carried to its logical conclusion." Two months later in a letter to another member Utah State sociology professor Lowry Nelson, the First Presidency stated that marriage between a White person and a Black person is "most repugnant" and "does not have the sanction of the Church and is contrary to church doctrine".

== 1950–1978 teachings ==
=== Under David O. McKay ===
The latter half of the 20th century saw many changes in American legal and social views on interracial marriages, and many changes in top church leaders' teachings on the topic. For instance, church apostle Mark E. Petersen said in a 1954 address that church doctrine barred Black people and White people from marrying each other. The speech was circulated among the faculty of church-run Brigham Young University (BYU), much to the embarrassment of fellow LDS scholars. Over twenty years later Petersen denied knowing if the copies of his speech being passed around were authentic or not, apparently out of embarrassment for his previous statements.

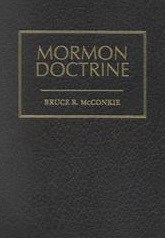
McConkie's popular Mormon Doctrine was in print for over 50 years and instructed non-Black Mormons not to marry Black people.

In 1958, church apostle Bruce R. McConkie published Mormon Doctrine, in which he stated that "the whole negro race have been cursed with a Black skin, the mark of Cain, so they can be identified as a caste apart, a people with whom the other descendants of Adam should not intermarry." The quote remained for half a century, despite many other revisions, until the church's Deseret Book ceased printing the book in 2010. The apostle Delbert L. Stapley stated in a 1964 letter to George W. Romney that Black people should not be entitled to "inter-marriage privileges with the Whites."

In 1960, BYU leaders were "very much concerned" when a male Black student received a large number of votes for BYU student vice president, and, subsequently, apostle Harold Lee told BYU president Ernest Wilkinson he would hold him responsible if one of his granddaughters ever went to "BYU and bec[a]me engaged to a colored boy". A few months later in 1961 BYU's board of trustees decided for the first time to officially discourage Black students from attending BYU and encourage them to attend other universities. By 1965 administrators were sending a rejection letter to Black applicants which cited BYU's discouragement of interracial courtship and marriage as the motive behind the decision. By 1968 there was only one Black American student at BYU.

In 1966, a White woman who had received her endowment was banned by local leaders from returning to the temple and was told her temple ordinances were invalid because she had since married a Black man. Church president David O. McKay upheld her exclusion from church temples, but stated that her endowment was still valid.

=== Spencer W. Kimball ===
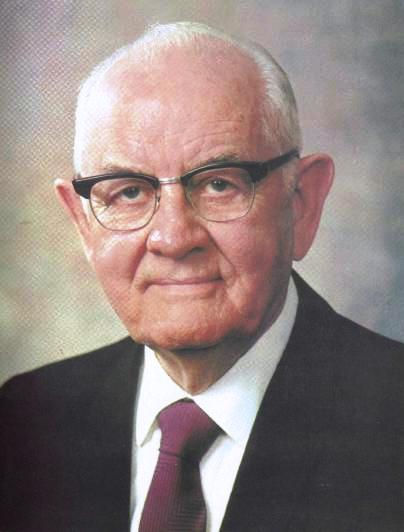
Kimball gave several addresses in the 1950s, 1960s, and 1970s discouraging interracial marriage.

Then apostle Spencer W. Kimball gave several speeches addressing the topic of interracial marriage. In a 1958 BYU address he stated that "[w]hen I said you must teach your people to overcome their prejudices and accept the Indians, I did not mean that you would encourage intermarriage ... we must discourage intermarriage ... it is not expedient." He added that interracial marriage was not considered a sin. In a January 1959 address Kimball taught that church leaders were unanimous in teachings that Caucasians should marry Caucasians, stating that interracial marriage was selfish because the background differences could be a challenge for the marriage and the couple's children. He also told BYU students in 1965 that "the brethren feel that it is not the wisest thing to cross racial lines in dating and marrying", something he repeated at BYU as church president in 1976.

== Teachings from 1978–present ==
Many church publications since the 1978 lifting of the Black temple and priesthood ban have contained statements discouraging interracial marriage. In the same June 1978 issue announcing that Black members were now eligible for temple ordinances, missionary service, and priesthood ordination, the official church newspaper also printed the article "Interracial marriage discouraged". The same day of the change, a church spokesperson stated "interracial marriages generally have been discouraged in the past, ... that remains our position" and that "the Church does not prohibit ... interracial marriages but it does discourage them."

In 2003, author Jon Krakauer stated in his book Under the Banner of Heaven that "official LDS policy has continued to strongly admonish White saints not to marry blacks". In response, the church's public affairs released a statement from BYU Dean of Religious Education Robert L. Millet that "[t]here is, in fact, no mention whatsoever in [the church] handbook concerning interracial marriages. In addition, having served as a Church leader for almost 30 years, I can also certify that I have never received official verbal instructions condemning marriages between Black and White members." Though, denying any condemnation of interracial marriage, there was no comment on whether it was still discouraged. The most recent statement came in 2008 when spokesperson Mark Tuttle stated that the church has no policy against interracial marriage.

Church leaders' discouragement of marriage between those of different ethnicities continued being taught to youth during church Sunday meetings until 2013, when the use of the 1996 version of the Sunday school textbook for adolescent boys was discontinued. The manual had used a 1976 quote from past church president Kimball which read, "We recommend that people marry those who are of the same racial background generally". The quote remains in the still-used, institute Eternal Marriage Student Manual. Additionally, a footnote to a 1995 general conference talk by the apostle Russell M. Nelson noted that loving without racial discrimination is a general commandment, but not one to apply to specific marriage partner criteria since it states that being united in ethnic background increases the probability of a successful marriage. In 2013, the church published an essay called "Race and the Priesthood". The article disavowed teachings in the past that interracial marriage was a sin, indicating that it was influenced by racism of the time. A 2023 survey of over 1,000 former church members in the Mormon corridor found race issues in the church to be one of the top three reported reasons why they had disaffiliated.

== See also ==
- Anti-miscegenation laws
- Black people and Mormonism
- Celestial marriage
- Culture of the LDS Church
- Marriage in the LDS Church
- Phrenology and the Latter Day Saint movement
- Race and sexuality
- Racial segregation of churches in the United States
