= Slave states and free states =

Historical division of United States by legality of slavery

An animation showing the free/slave status of U.S. states and territories, 1789–1861 (see separate yearly maps below). The American Civil War began in 1861. The 13th Amendment, effective December 6, 1865, abolished slavery in the U.S.

In the United States before 1865, a free state was a state in which slavery and the internal or domestic slave trade were prohibited, while a slave state was one in which they were legal. Between 1812 and 1850, it was considered by the slave states to be politically imperative that the number of free states not exceed the number of slave states, so new states were admitted in slave–free pairs. There were, nonetheless, some slaves in most free states up to the 1840 census, and the Fugitive Slave Clause of the U.S. Constitution, as implemented by the Fugitive Slave Act of 1793 and the Fugitive Slave Act of 1850, provided that a slave did not become free by entering a free state and must be returned to their owner. Enforcement of these laws became one of the controversies that arose between slave and free states.

By the 18th century, slavery was legal throughout the Thirteen Colonies, but at the time of the American Revolution, rebel colonies started to abolish the practice. Pennsylvania abolished slavery in 1780, and about half the states had abolished slavery by the end of the Revolutionary War or in the first decades of the new country's existence, although, depending on the jurisdiction, this did not mean that all slaves became immediately free due to gradual abolition. Vermont — having declared its independence from Britain in 1777 and thus not being one of the Thirteen Colonies — banned slavery in the same year, before being admitted as a state in 1791.

Slavery was a divisive issue in the United States. It was a major issue during the writing of the U.S. Constitution in 1787, the subject of political crises in the Missouri Compromise of 1820 and the Compromise of 1850, and it was the primary cause of the American Civil War in 1861. Just before the Civil War, there were 19 free states and 15 slave states. The most recent free state, Kansas, had entered the Union after its own years-long bloody fight over slavery. During the war, slavery was abolished in some of the slave states, and the Thirteenth Amendment to the United States Constitution, ratified in December 1865, abolished chattel slavery throughout the United States.

== History ==
=== Early history ===
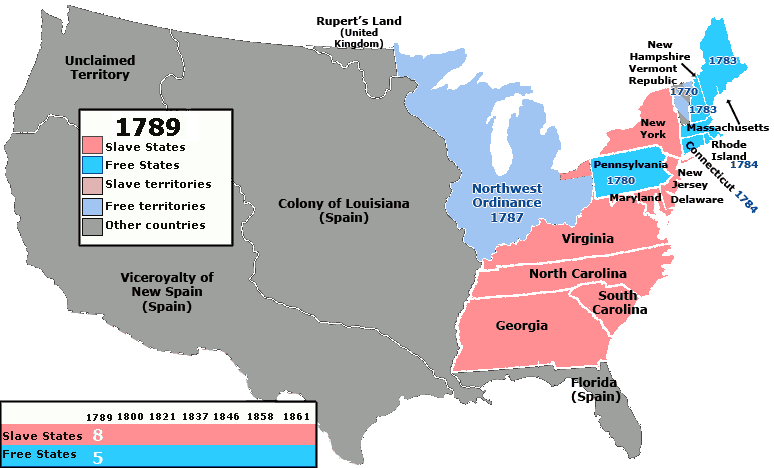
During the American Revolution (1775–1783) some of the 13 British colonies seeking independence to become states began to abolish slavery. The U.S. Constitution ratified in 1789, left the matter in the hands of each state, and with federal jurisdiction in the territories asserted by Congress, particularly with the Northwest Ordinance of 1787.

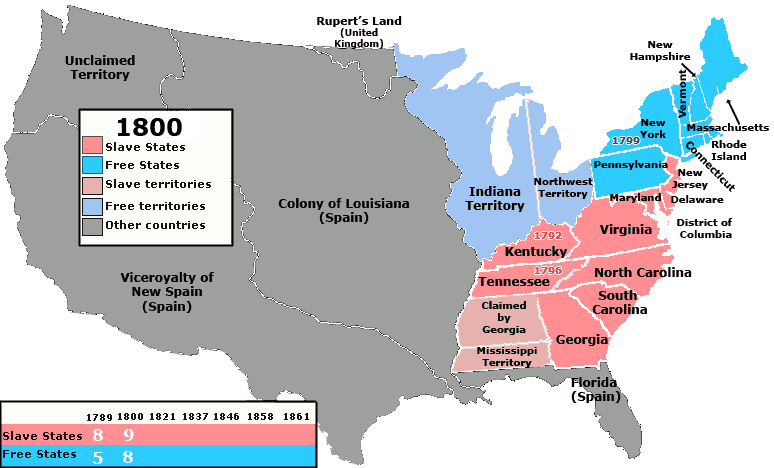
In the early years of the United States, a north-south divide became evident.

Slavery was established as a legal institution in each of the Thirteen Colonies, starting in 1619 with the arrival of "twenty and odd" enslaved Africans in Virginia. Although indigenous peoples were also sold into slavery, the vast majority of the enslaved population consisted of Africans brought to the Americas via the Atlantic slave trade. Due to a lower prevalence of tropical diseases and better treatment, the enslaved population in the colonies had a higher life expectancy than in the West Indies and South America, leading to a rapid increase in population in the decades prior to the American Revolution. Organized political and social movements to abolish slavery began in the mid-18th century. The sentiments of the American Revolution and the promise of equality evoked by the Declaration of Independence stood in contrast to the status of most Black people, either free or enslaved, in the colonies. Despite this, thousands of Black Americans fought for the Patriot cause for a combination of reasons. Thousands also joined the British, encouraged by offers of freedom (and threats of sale into slavery if they failed to join) such as the Philipsburg Proclamation.

In the 1770s, enslaved Black people throughout New England began sending petitions to northern legislatures demanding freedom. Five Northern states adopted policies to at least gradually abolish slavery: Pennsylvania in 1780, New Hampshire and Massachusetts in 1783, and Connecticut and Rhode Island in 1784. The Republic of Vermont had limited slavery in 1777, while it was still independent before it joined the United States as the 14th state in 1791. These state jurisdictions thus enacted the first abolition laws in the Atlantic World. By 1804 (including New York in 1799 and New Jersey in 1804), all the Northern states had abolished slavery or set measures in place to gradually abolish it, although there were still hundreds of ex-slaves working without pay as indentured servants in Northern states as late as the 1840 census (see Slavery in the United States#Abolitionism in the North).

In the South, Kentucky was created as a slave state from Virginia (1792), and Tennessee was created as a slave state from North Carolina (1796). By 1804, before the creation of new states from the federal western territories, the number of slave and free states was eight each. By the time of Missouri Compromise of 1820, the dividing line between the slave and free states was called the Mason–Dixon line (between Maryland and Pennsylvania), with its westward extension being the Ohio River.

The 1787 Constitutional Convention debated slavery, and for a time slavery was a major impediment to passage of the new constitution. As a compromise, slavery was acknowledged but never mentioned explicitly in the Constitution. The Fugitive Slave Clause, Article 4, section 2, clause 3, for example, refers to a "Person held to Service or Labor." In addition, Article 1, section 9, clause 1 of the Constitution prohibited Congress from abolishing the importation of slaves, but in a compromise, the prohibition could be lifted by Congress in 20 years, and slaves were referred to as "Persons." The Act Prohibiting Importation of Slaves passed easily in 1807 and took effect on January 1, 1808. However, the ban on importation spurred an expansion in the domestic slave trade, which remained legal until slavery was banned entirely in 1865 by the 13th Amendment.

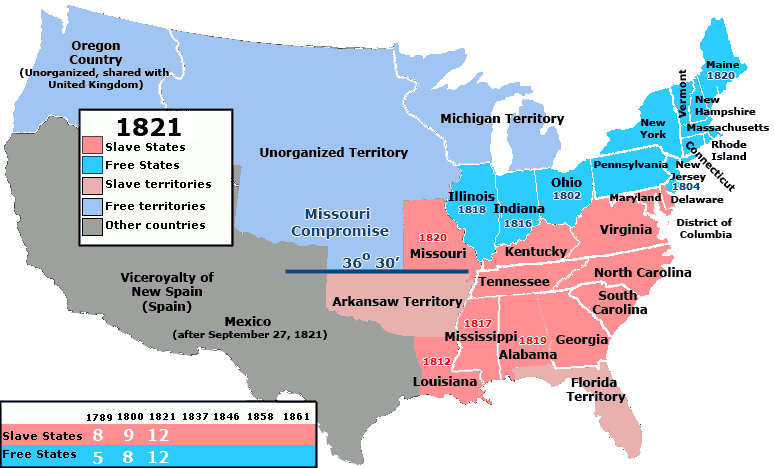
The Missouri Compromise of 1820, trading the admission of Missouri (a slave state) for Maine (a free state), drew a line extending west from Missouri's southern border, which was intended to divide any new territory into slave (south of the line) and free (north of the line).

In the late 1850s, several Southern states launched an unsuccessful campaign to resume the international slave trade, in order to restock their slave populations, but this met with strong opposition. However, a large natural increase in the slave population occurred throughout the late 18th and 19th centuries, while some illegal smuggling of African slaves continued via Spanish Cuba.

Another compromise in the Constitution was the Three-Fifths Clause, by which slave states acquired representation in the House of Representatives and Electoral College equivalent to 60 percent of their disenfranchised slave populations. Slave states had wanted 100 percent of their slaves to be counted, whereas Northern states argued that none should be, because, as Elbridge Gerry said, why should "blacks, who were property in the South", count toward representation "any more than the Cattle & horses of the North"?

=== New Territories ===
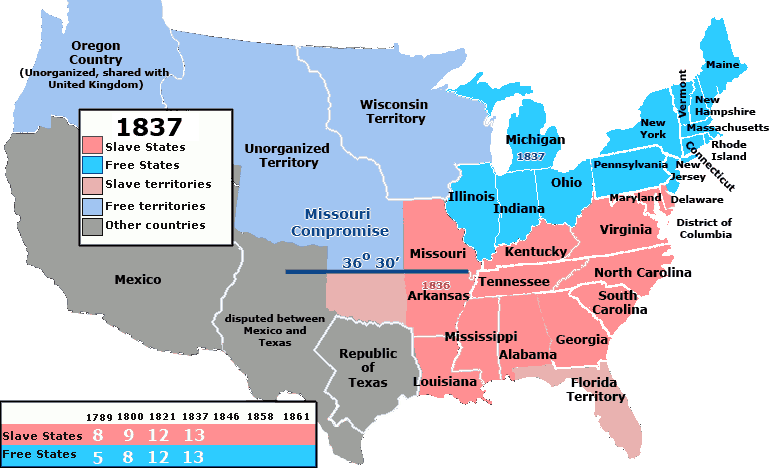
With the statehood of Arkansas in 1836, the number of slave states grew to 13, but the statehood of Michigan in 1837 maintained the balance between slave and free states.

The Northwest Ordinance of 1787, passed just before the U.S. Constitution was ratified, had prohibited slavery in the federal Northwest Territory. The southern boundary of the territory was the Ohio River, which was regarded as a westward extension of the Mason–Dixon line. The territory was generally settled by New Englanders and American Revolutionary War veterans who were granted land there. The 6 states created from the territory were all free states: Ohio (1803), Indiana (1816), Illinois (1818), Michigan (1837), Wisconsin (1848), and Minnesota (1858).

By 1815, the momentum for anti-slavery reform appeared to run out of steam, with half the states having already abolished slavery (Northeast), prohibited it from the start (Midwest), or committed to eliminating it, and half committed to continuing the institution indefinitely (South).

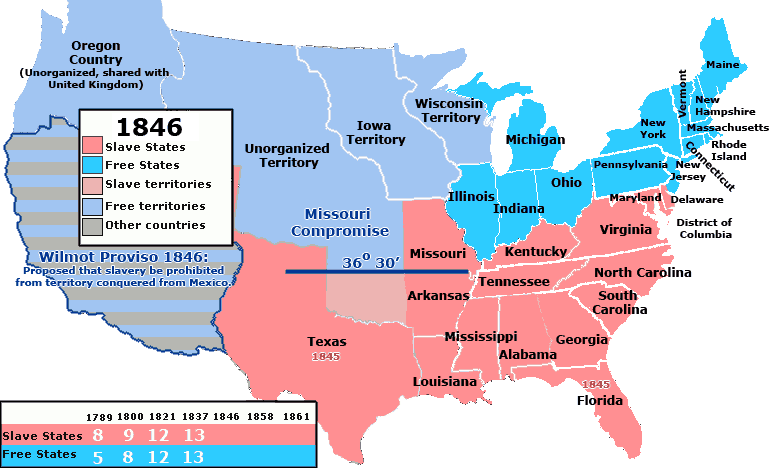
By 1845, with Texas and Florida in the Union as slave states, slave states once again outnumbered the free states for a year until Iowa was admitted as a free state in 1846.

The potential for political conflict over slavery at the federal level made politicians concerned about the balance of power in the Senate, where each state was represented by two senators. With an equal number of slave states and free states, the Senate was equally divided on issues important to the South. As the population of the free states began to outstrip the population of the slave states, leading to control of the House of Representatives by free states, the Senate became the preoccupation of slave-state politicians interested in maintaining a congressional veto over federal policy with regard to slavery and other issues important to the South. As a result of this preoccupation, slave states and free states were often admitted into the Union in opposite pairs to maintain the existing Senate balance between slave and free states.

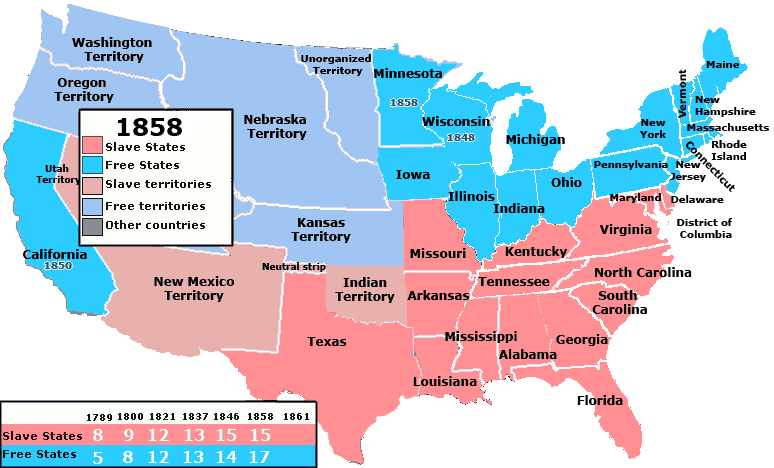
By 1858, 17 free states, which included California (1850), and Minnesota (1858), outnumbered the 15 slave states.

==== Missouri Compromise ====
Controversy over whether Missouri should be admitted as a slave state resulted in the Missouri Compromise of 1820, which specified that territory acquired in the Louisiana Purchase north of latitude 36° 30', which described most of Missouri's southern border, would, except for Missouri, become free states, and territory south of that line would become slave states. As part of the compromise, Maine, on August 19, 1821, was admitted as a free state.

==== Texas and the Mexican Cession ====
The admission of Texas as a slave state in 1845 and the acquisition of the vast new Mexican Cession territories in 1848, after the Mexican–American War, created further north–south conflict. Anglo-American settlers brought slaves to Mexican Texas, and though Mexico outlawed slavery in most of its territories in 1829, Texas was granted an exemption. The settled portion of Texas was an area rich in cotton plantations and dependent on slave labor, while the territory acquired in the Mountain West did not seem hospitable to cotton or slavery.

As part of the Compromise of 1850, California was admitted as a free state. After Oregon was admitted as a free state in 1859, there were no slave states on the Pacific coast. To avoid creating a free state majority in the Senate, California was forced to send one pro-slavery and one anti-slavery senator to Congress.

==== Last battles ====
The difficulty of identifying territory that could be organized into additional slave states stalled the process of opening the western territories to settlement. Slave-state politicians made efforts to annex Cuba (see: Lopez Expedition and Ostend Manifesto, 1852) and Nicaragua (see: Filibuster War, 1856–57), with intentions to create new slave states. Parts of Northern Mexico were also coveted, with Senator Albert Brown declaring "I want Tamaulipas, Potosi, and one or two other Mexican States; and I want them all for the same reason – for the plantation and spreading of slavery".

==== Kansas ====
In 1854, the Missouri Compromise of 1820 was superseded by the Kansas–Nebraska Act, which allowed white male settlers in the new territories to determine, by vote (popular sovereignty), whether they would allow slavery within each territory. The result was that pro- and anti-slavery elements flooded into Kansas with the goal of voting slavery up or down, leading to bloody fighting. An effort was initiated to organize Kansas for admission as a slave state, paired with Minnesota, but the admission of Kansas as a slave state was blocked because its proposed pro-slavery constitution (the Lecompton Constitution) had not been approved in an honest election. Anti-slavery proponents during the "Bleeding Kansas" period of the later 1850s were called Free-Staters and Free-Soilers and fought against pro-slavery Border Ruffians from Missouri. The animosity escalated throughout the 1850s, culminating in numerous skirmishes and devastation on both sides of the question. Nevertheless, the North prevented Kansas Territory from becoming a slave state, and when Southern members of Congress departed en masse in early 1861, Kansas was immediately admitted to the Union as a free state.

When the admission of Minnesota proceeded unimpeded in 1858, the balance in the Senate ended; this was compounded by the subsequent admission of Oregon as a free state in 1859.

==== Slave and free state pairs ====
The following table shows the balance between slave and free states that began in 1812. The Statehood columns provide the year the state either ratified the U.S. Constitution or was admitted to the Union. The date ranges in the Abolition column for Free States indicate when gradual abolition laws were adopted and when slavery finally ended, except for states where slavery was outlawed in a specific year.

| Slave States | Statehood | 1860, # and % of population in slaves | Free States | Statehood | Free state immediate or gradual abolition and 1860 % |
|---|---|---|---|---|---|
| Delaware | 1787 | 1,798 – 1.6% | New Jersey | 1787 | 1804–65 – 0.01% |
| Georgia | 1788 | 462,198 – 43.7% | Pennsylvania | 1787 | 1780–1840s – 0% |
| Maryland | 1788 | 87,189 – 12.7% | Connecticut | 1788 | 1784–1840s – 0% |
| South Carolina | 1788 | 402,406 – 57.2% | Massachusetts | 1788 | Free 1783 – 0% |
| Virginia | 1788 | 490,865 – 30.7% | New Hampshire | 1788 | 1783–1800, Free 1857 – 0% |
| North Carolina | 1789 | 331,059 – 33.4% | New York | 1788 | 1799–1840s – 0% |
| Kentucky | 1792 | 225,483 – 19.5% | Rhode Island | 1790 | 1784–1840s – 0% |
| Tennessee | 1796 | 275,719 – 24.8% | Vermont | 1791 | Free 1777 – 0% |
| Louisiana | 1812 | 331,726 – 46.9% | Ohio | 1803 | Free 1787 – 0% |

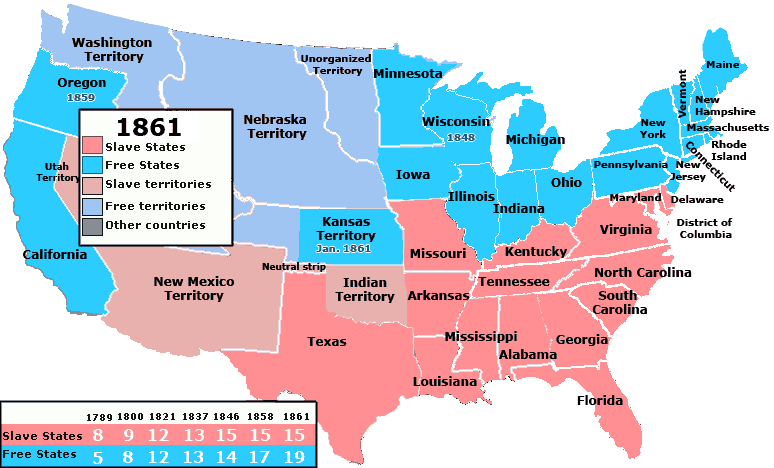
By the eve of the Civil War in mid-1861, with the addition of Oregon (1859) and Kansas (1861), the number of free states had grown to 19 while the number of slave states remained at 15.

From 1812 through 1850, maintaining the balance of free and slave state votes in the Senate was considered of paramount importance if the Union were to be preserved, and states were typically admitted in pairs:

| Slave states | Year | Free states | Year |
|---|---|---|---|
| Mississippi | 1817 | Indiana | 1816 |
| Alabama | 1819 | Illinois | 1818 |
| Missouri | 1821 | Maine | 1820 |
| Arkansas | 1836 | Michigan | 1837 |
| Florida | 1845 | Iowa | 1846 |
| Texas | 1845 | Wisconsin | 1848 |

California was admitted as a free state in 1850 without an accompanying slave state, though certain concessions were made to the slave states as part of the Compromise of 1850. Three more free states were admitted in the final years before the Civil War, disrupting the balance that the slave states had tried to maintain.

| Slave states | Year | Free states | Year |
|---|---|---|---|
| | | California | 1850 |
| | | Minnesota | 1858 |
| | | Oregon | 1859 |
| | | Kansas | 1861 |

==== Civil War ====
Division of states during the Civil War. Blue represents Union states, including those admitted during the war; light blue represents border states, some of which had both Confederate and Unionist governments; red represents Confederate states. Unshaded areas were not states before or during the Civil War.

The American Civil War (1861–1865) disrupted and eventually ended slavery. Eleven slave states joined the Confederacy, while the border states of Delaware, Maryland, Kentucky, and Missouri – all slave states – remained in the Union, although Kentucky and Missouri also had competing Confederate state governments. In 1863 western Virginia, much of which had remained loyal to the Union, was admitted as the new state of West Virginia with a commitment to gradual emancipation. The following year Nevada, a free state in the West, was also admitted.

| Slave state | Year | Free state | Year |
|---|---|---|---|
| West Virginia (gradual abolition plan) | 1863 | Nevada | 1864 |

=== Special cases ===
==== West Virginia ====
During the Civil War, a Unionist government in Wheeling, Virginia, presented a statehood bill to Congress to create a new state from 48 counties in western Virginia. The new state would eventually incorporate 50 counties. The issue of slavery in the new state delayed approval of the bill. In the Senate Charles Sumner objected to the admission of a new slave state, while Benjamin Wade defended statehood as long as a gradual emancipation clause would be included in the new state constitution. Two senators represented the Unionist Virginia government, John S. Carlile and Waitman T. Willey. Senator Carlile objected that Congress had no right to impose emancipation on West Virginia, while Willey proposed a compromise amendment to the state constitution for gradual abolition. Sumner attempted to add his own amendment to the bill, which was defeated, and the statehood bill passed both houses of Congress with the addition of what became known as the Willey Amendment. President Lincoln signed the bill on December 31, 1862. Voters in western Virginia approved the Willey Amendment on March 26, 1863.

On January 1, 1863, President Lincoln had issued the Emancipation Proclamation, which exempted from emancipation the border states (four slave states loyal to the Union) as well as some territories occupied by Union forces within Confederate states. Two additional counties were added to West Virginia in late 1863, Berkeley and Jefferson. The slaves in Berkeley were not emancipated, but those in Jefferson County were. As of the census of 1860, the 49 exempted counties held some 6000 slaves over 21 years of age who would not have been emancipated, about 40 percent of the total slave population. The Willey Amendment freed only children, at birth or as they came of age, and prohibited the importation of slaves.

Abolition of slavery in the various states of the US over time: Abolition of slavery during or shortly after the American Revolution (Vermont, 1777; Massachusetts [including Maine], 1783) The Northwest Ordinance, 1787 Gradual emancipation in New York (starting 1799, ended 1827), Pennsylvania (1780–1857), New Hampshire (1783–1857), Connecticut [including the Western Reserve] (1784–1848), Rhode Island (1784–1853) and New Jersey (starting 1804; ended by Thirteenth Amendment, 1865) The Missouri Compromise, 1821 Effective abolition of slavery by Mexican or joint US/British authority Abolition of slavery by Congressional action, 1861 Abolition of slavery by Congressional action, 1862 Emancipation Proclamation as originally issued, 1 Jan 1863 Subsequent operation of the Emancipation Proclamation in 1863 Abolition of slavery by state action during the Civil War Operation of the Emancipation Proclamation in 1864 Operation of the Emancipation Proclamation in 1865 Thirteenth Amendment to the US constitution, 18 Dec 1865 Territory incorporated into the US after the passage of the Thirteenth Amendment

West Virginia became the 35th state on June 20, 1863, and the last slave state admitted to the Union. Eighteen months later, the West Virginia legislature completely abolished slavery, and also ratified the 13th Amendment on February 3, 1865.

==== Washington D.C. ====
In the District of Columbia, formed with land from two slave states, Maryland and Virginia, the slave trade was abolished by the Compromise of 1850. So as to avoid losing the profitable slave-trading businesses in Alexandria (one was Franklin and Armfield), Alexandria County, D.C., requested that it be returned to Virginia, where the slave trade was legal; this took place in 1847. Slavery in the District of Columbia remained legal until 1862, when, over strong opposition from slaveholding residents, Congress passed the DC Compensated Emancipation Act. Some slaveholders refused to acknowledge the law and attempted to keep enslaved people in bondage illegally. Congress passed a supplemental law in July 1862 that allowed these victims to file petitions on their own behalf."

==== Utah Territory ====
Although it did not become a state until 1896, as an organized territory, Utah legalized slavery under the 1852 territorial Act in Relation to Service and similar Act for the Relief of Indian Slaves and Prisoners.

Brigham Young and his group of Mormon pioneers had arrived in Utah in 1847, during the Mexican–American War, when Utah Territory was Mexican territory. They ignored the Mexican ban on slavery. They viewed slavery as consistent with the Mormon view on Black people.

On June 19, 1862, fulfilling a part of his 1860 campaign platform, President Lincoln signed a law ending slavery in Utah Territory and all other territories.

==== California ====
While California's state constitution outlawed slavery, the 1850 Act for the Government and Protection of Indians allowed the indenture of Native Californians. This law provided for apprenticing or indenturing Indian children to Whites, and also punished vagrant Indians by hiring them out to the highest bidder at a public auction if the Indian could not provide sufficient bond or bail. The new settlers took 10,000 to 27,000 California Native Americans as forced laborers, including 4,000 to 7,000 children. In April 1863, after the declaration of the Emancipation Proclamation, the California legislature abolished all forms of legal indenture and apprenticeship for Native Americans.

=== End of slave/free divide ===
At the start of the Civil War, there were 34 states in the United States, 15 of which were slave states. Eleven of these slave states, after conventions devoted to the topic, issued declarations of secession from the United States, created the Confederate States of America, and were represented in the Confederate Congress. The slave states that stayed in the Union – Maryland, Missouri, Delaware, and Kentucky (called border states) – retained their representatives in the U.S. Congress. By the time the Emancipation Proclamation was issued in 1863, Tennessee was already under Union control. Accordingly, the Proclamation applied only in the 10 remaining Confederate states. During the war, abolition of slavery was required by President Abraham Lincoln for readmission of Confederate states.

The U.S. Congress, after the departure of the powerful Southern contingent in 1861, was generally abolitionist: in a plan endorsed by Abraham Lincoln, slavery in the District of Columbia, which the Southern contingent had protected, was abolished in 1862.

In Southern states, freedom for slaves typically followed the Union army's gaining control of an area. The Emancipation Proclamation declared all enslaved people in areas then under Confederate control free, but, in practice, freedom required either slaves reaching Union lines or Union forces reaching their area. As Union forces advanced from January 1, 1863, to June 19, 1865, slaves were freed.

West Virginia did not abolish slavery in its first proposed constitution of 1861, though it did ban the importation of slaves. In 1863, voters approved the Willey Amendment, which provided for gradual abolition of slavery, with the last enslaved people scheduled to be freed in 1884. On February 3, 1865, the state legislature approved immediate abolition.

The Restored Government of Virginia – the Unionist government that governed the limited territory then under Union control that had not left to form West Virginia – voted to end slavery at a constitutional convention on March 10, 1864. Arkansas, part of which came under Union control by 1864, adopted an anti-slavery constitution on March 16, 1864. Louisiana – much of which had been under Union control since 1862 – abolished slavery through a new state constitution approved by voters September 5, 1864. The border states of Maryland (November 1, 1864) and Missouri (January 11, 1865) abolished slavery before the war's end. The Union-occupied state of Tennessee abolished slavery by popular vote on a constitutional amendment that took effect February 22, 1865.

However, slavery legally persisted in Delaware, Kentucky, and (to a very limited extent, due to a trade ban but continued gradual abolition) New Jersey, until, on December 18, 1865, the Thirteenth Amendment to the United States Constitution abolished slavery throughout the United States, except as punishment for a crime, ending the distinction between slave and free states.

== See also ==
- Border states (American Civil War)
- Golden Circle (proposed country)
- Quilombo
- Slavery in the colonial United States
- Slavery in the United States
- Wilmot Proviso
- History of slavery in the United States by state
