= History of slavery in Utah =

Slavery as it occurred in the borders of what is now the state of Utah has a complicated history. Under Spanish and Mexican rule, Utah was a major source of illegal slave raids by Mexican, Ute and Navajo slave traders, particularly on Paiute tribes. When Mormon pioneers entered Utah, they introduced African slavery and provided a local market for Indian slavery. After the Mexican–American War, Utah became part of the United States and slavery was officially legalized in Utah Territory on February 4, 1852, with the passing of the Act in Relation to Service. It was repealed on June 19, 1862, when Congress prohibited slavery in all US territories.

== Native American slavery ==
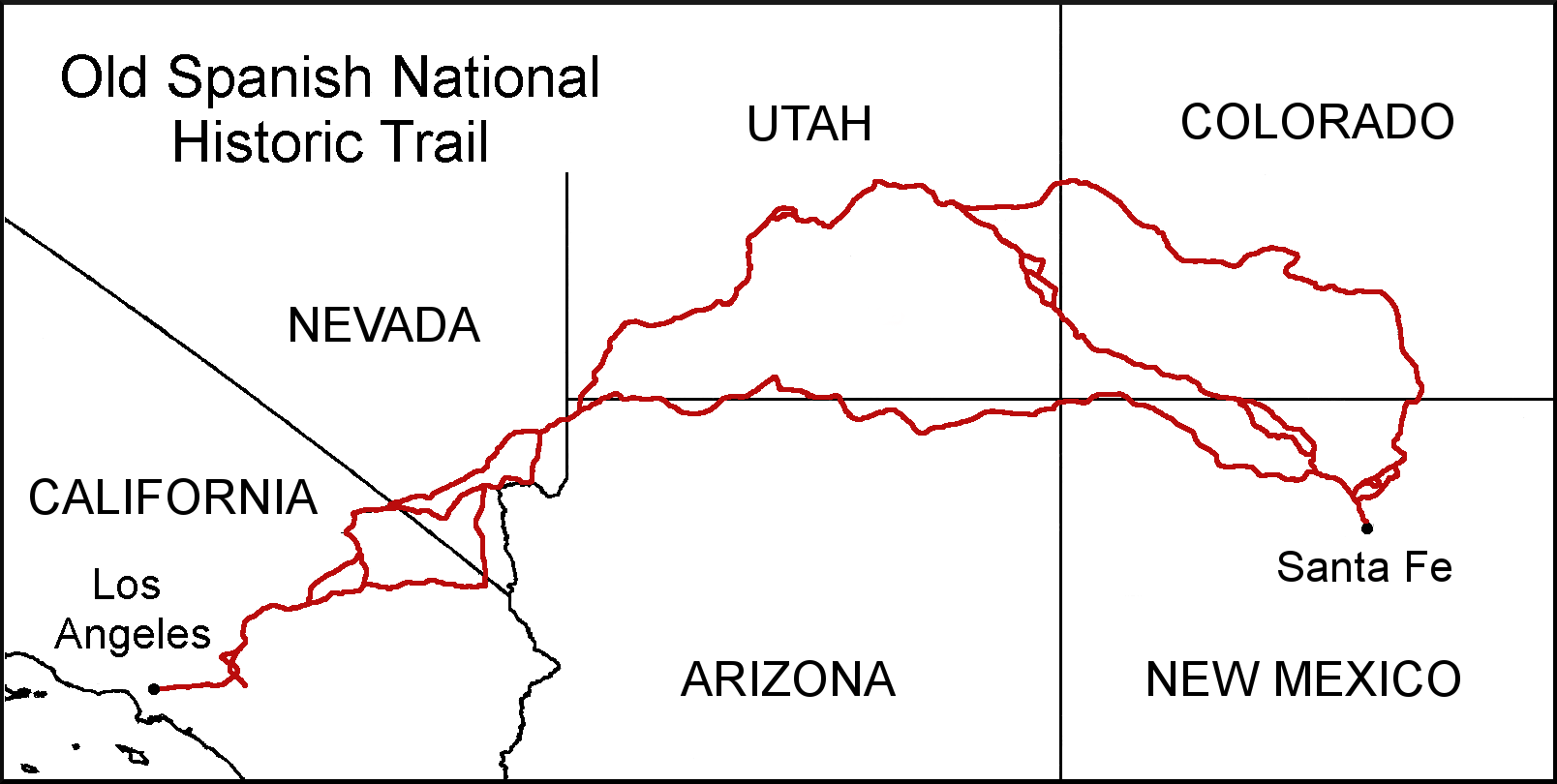
Slave raids were common along the Old Spanish Trail.

From 1824 to 1848, Utah was part of the Mexican province of Alta California (Upper California). Mexican trading parties would often travel the Old Spanish Trail, which went through modern day Utah, and buy Indian slaves to sell in the neighboring territory of Santa Fe de Nuevo Mexico or other places in Alta California. Mexicans, Utes, and Navajos would raid Paiute and sometimes Ute villages for slaves. Slavery had been made illegal in Santa Fe de Nuevo México in 1812 and in Alta California Territory in 1824, but lax enforcement and high profits kept it going. Boys would sell for $100 and girls between $150 and $200. Indigenous girls could demand a higher price because they had a reputation for making the best house servants. In addition, Mexican laws allowed for an aggressive debt bondage in the form of the peonage system.

=== Native enslavement by Mormons ===
Shortly after the Mormon pioneers arrived in Salt Lake Valley, they began expanding into Indian territory, which often resulted in conflict. After expanding into the Utah Valley, Brigham Young issued an extermination order against the Timpanogos, resulting in the Battle at Fort Utah, where many Timpanogo women and children were taken into slavery. Some were able to escape, but many died in slavery. In the winter of 1849–1850, after expanding into Parowan, Mormons attacked a group of Indians, killing around 25 men and taking the women and children as slaves. News of the enslavement reached the US government, who appointed Edward Cooper as Indian agent in September 1850. Edward Cooper made the issue of Indian slavery one of his first efforts.

At the encouragement of Mormon leaders, the Mormon pioneers started participating in the Indian slave trade. In 1851, Apostle George A. Smith gave Chief Peteetneet and Walkara talking papers that certified "it is my desire that they should be treated as friends, and as they wish to Trade horses, Buckskins and Piede children, we hope them success and prosperity and good bargain." In May 1851 Brigham Young met with settlers in the Parawon region and encouraged them to "buy up the Lamanite children as fast as they could" so as to "educate them, and teach them the gospel."

The Mormons strongly opposed the competing New Mexican slave trade. In November 1851, Don Pedro León Luján, a New Mexican slave trader who had been operating in Utah with a New Mexico license, asked Young as the newly appointed governor of Utah for a license to trade with the Indians, including slaves. Young refused to given Luján a license to conduct any trade with the Indians. On the way home to New Mexico, Luján's party was attacked by Ute Indians, who stole his horses. Luján retaliated by kidnapping some of their children to sell in New Mexico. He and his party were caught in Manti and charged with violating the Nonintercourse Act, which prohibited trading with the Indians without a valid license. His property was seized and the children were sold into slavery to families in Manti. He contested, claiming it was hypocritical to not allow him to have slaves, but allow the Mormon families to have slaves.

Many of Walker's band were upset by the interruption with the Mexican slave trade. In one graphic incident, Ute Indian Chief Arrapine, a brother of Chief Walkara, insisted that because the Mormons had stopped the Mexicans from buying these children, the Mormons were obligated to purchase them. In his book, Forty Years Among the Indians, Daniel Jones wrote, "[s]everal of us were present when he took one of these children by the heels and dashed its brains out on the hard ground, after which he threw the body towards us, telling us we had no hearts, or we would have bought it and saved its life."

A month after legalizing slavery with the Act in Relation to Service, Utah passed the Act for the relief of Indian Slaves and Prisoners, which officially legalized Indian Slavery in Utah. The bill provided some protections for the Indian slaves, including a requirement to educate and clothe the Indians, and a limit of twenty years, which was greater than the New Mexican limit of ten years.

Mormons continued taking children from their families long after the slave traders left and even began to actively solicit children from Paiute parents. They also began selling Indian slaves to each other. By 1853, each of the hundred households in Parowan had one or more Paiute children. Indian slaves were used for both domestic and manual labor. In 1857, Representative Justin Smith Morrill estimated that there were 400 Indian slaves in Utah. Richard Kitchen has identified at least 400 Indian slaves taken into Mormon homes, but estimates even more went unrecorded because of the high mortality rate of Indian slaves. Many of them tried to escape.

Historians Sarah Barringer Gordon and Kevin Waite have identified that over half of the Indian "adoptees" died by their early 20s. Those who survived and were released generally found themselves without a community, full members of neither their original tribes nor the white communities in which they were raised.

== Black enslavement by Mormons ==
In 1847, the Mormon pioneers arrived with African slaves, which was the first time African slavery was in the area. Three black people who arrived in Utah with Brigham Young's party were slaves. Mormons arrived in the middle of the Mexican–American War and ignored the Mexican ban on slavery. Instead, slavery was recognized by custom, which has been seen as naturally coming from the Mormon view on black people. Like many Christians of the day, Mormons believed in the Curse of Cain and Curse of Ham. Early Mormon leaders taught that God decreed that black people should be "servants of servants" and that governments did not have the power to reverse God's decree. Three slaves arrived in the first company of pioneers, but more arrived in later companies.

After Utah territory passed to American rule following the Treaty of Guadalupe Hidalgo in 1848, the issue of slavery in the newly acquired territories became a major issue, with the Whigs wanting to keep Mexico's ban on slavery and the Democrats wanting to introduce slavery. During discussions, Utah lobbyist John Milton Bernhisel hid Utah slavery from members of Congress. With the Compromise of 1850, Utah was granted the right to decide by popular sovereignty whether it wanted to allow slavery. By 1850, there were around 100 black people, the majority of whom were slaves. It is difficult to know the exact numbers, because Utah continued to hide slaves. The 1850 census of Utah territory was taken without the certification of Territorial Secretary Broughton Harris, who complained that the census was done in his absence and that it had several irregularities. The census only reported 26 slaves, with a note that all of them were heading to California, making it seem like there would not be any slaves in Utah. It did not include any of the slaves held in Bountiful, Utah.

In January 1852, Brigham Young, then Territorial Governor of Utah, addressed the Joint Session of the Legislature and advocated for slavery. On February 4, 1852, Utah passed the Act in Relation to Service, which officially legalized slavery in Utah territory. As in the other slave states, slaves tried to escape, were sold or donated, wanted their freedoms and were often treated similar to the slaves in other states. However, there were several unique characteristics to Utah slavery laws. The slave could be released for abuse or sexual relationships. Masters were required to clothe, educate and punish their slaves.

Orson Pratt was a vocal opponent of legalizing slavery in Utah. He stated that slavery is "a great evil" and that “for us to bind the African because he is different from us in color [is] enough to cause the angels in heaven to blush!” While the legislation that allowed slavery passed in 1852, Pratt continued to argue against slavery. For example, in 1856, Pratt stated: “We have no proof that the Africans are the descendants of old Cain who was cursed, and even if we had that evidence we have not been ordered to inflict that [curse] upon that race.”

When the Civil War broke out, there is some indication that some slave owners returned to the South because they were thought they were more likely to keep their slaves. On June 19, 1862, Congress prohibited slavery in all US territories.

== See also ==
- History of African Americans in Utah
- Mormonism and slavery
- Biddy Mason
