= Human trafficking in Utah =

Human trafficking in Utah is the illegal trade of human beings for the purposes of reproductive slavery, commercial sexual exploitation, and forced labor as it occurs in the state of Utah, and it is widely recognized as a modern-day form of slavery. It includes "the recruitment, transportation, transfer, harboring or receipt of persons by means of threat or use of force or other forms of coercion, of abduction, of fraud, of deception, of the abuse of power, or of a position of vulnerability or of the giving or receiving of payments or benefits to achieve the consent of a person having control over another person, for the purpose of exploitation. Exploitation shall include, at a minimum, the exploitation of prostitution of others or other forms of sexual exploitation, forced labor services, slavery or practices similar to slavery, servitude or the removal of organs." Human trafficking is a growing problem in Utah.

== Human trafficking laws ==
On June 19, 1862, the United States made slavery illegal in all US territories, including Utah territory, effectively overturning the Act in Relation to Service. Currently, the Mann Act and the Trafficking Victims Protection Act (TVPA), are used to prosecute human trafficking cases in Utah that cross state lines. Under the TVPA, human trafficking includes any exploitation of a minor or the use of force, fraud or coercion on an adult. In 2008, Utah passed Human Trafficking Amendments to the Utah Code, which prohibited human trafficking within the state of Utah. Unlike the TVPA, Utah defines human trafficking as "forced labor or forced sexual exploitation". Unlike the TVPA, Utah law makes no exceptions for minors. Because Utah requires proof of force, even for minors, prosecutions in Utah are very difficult. Utah law also does not allocate any funds for victims or give them special rights. However, the Utah legislative is looking into expanding existing laws on human trafficking.

== Anti-human trafficking efforts ==
In 2012, Shared Hope International chose Salt Lake City as one of ten areas for in-depth study for child sex trafficking. The report criticized Salt Lake City's handling of domestic minor sex trafficking. They say that victims are held like juvenile delinquents, that buyers of sex acts from minors are not punished, and that training to identify sex trafficking victims are minimal. They noted that even though almost everyone they interviewed had worked with a child sex trafficking case in the last two years, there were very few arrests. They point to weak laws.

Since the report was released, there has been a cultural change, and cases that would have previously been handled as prostitution are now being handled as human trafficking. This is partially because law enforcement is now better educated and lawmakers are giving them better tools to identify cases of human trafficking. In 2016, the Internet Crimes Against Children (ICAC) Task Force helped make 71 arrests in Utah, as part of an anti-human trafficking sting operation known as Operation Broken Heart III. Human trafficking rings have also been found to be operating out of Bountiful, using hotels in Salt Lake City to sell their victims, and in Thai massage parlors across the Wasatch Front.
