= Mormonism and slavery =

The Latter Day Saint movement has had varying and conflicting teachings on slavery. Early converts were initially from the Northern United States and opposed slavery, believing that their opposition was supported by Mormon scripture. After the church base moved to the slave state of Missouri and gained Southern converts, church leaders began to enslave people. New scriptures instructing Latter-Day Saints not to intervene in the lives of the enslaved people were revealed. A few enslavers joined the church, and when they moved to Nauvoo, Illinois, they illegally took their enslaved people with them, even though Illinois was a free state.

After Joseph Smith's death, the church split. The largest contingent followed Brigham Young, who stated that he was "neither an abolitionist nor a pro-slavery man." He allowed enslaved men and women to be brought to the territory but prohibited the enslavement of their descendants and required their consent before their owners could move them. Young established the Church of Jesus Christ of Latter-day Saints (LDS Church). A smaller contingent followed Joseph Smith III, who opposed slavery and established the Reorganized Church of Jesus Christ of Latter Day Saints (RLDS). Young brought his followers to Utah, where he led efforts to legalize slavery in the Utah Territory. Brigham Young taught his followers that slavery was ordained by God and that efforts to abolish it were contrary to the decrees of God and would eventually fail. He also encouraged members to participate in the enslavement of Native Americans.

== Teachings on slavery ==
Mormon scripture simultaneously denounces both slavery and abolitionism in general, teaching that it was not right for men to be in bondage to each other, but that one should not interfere with the enslavement of others. a belief that was common in America at the time. While promoting the legality of slavery, the church at one point taught against the abuse of enslaved people and advocated for laws that provided protection. Critics said the church's definition of the abuse of enslaved people was vague and difficult to enforce.

=== Curse of Cain and Ham ===
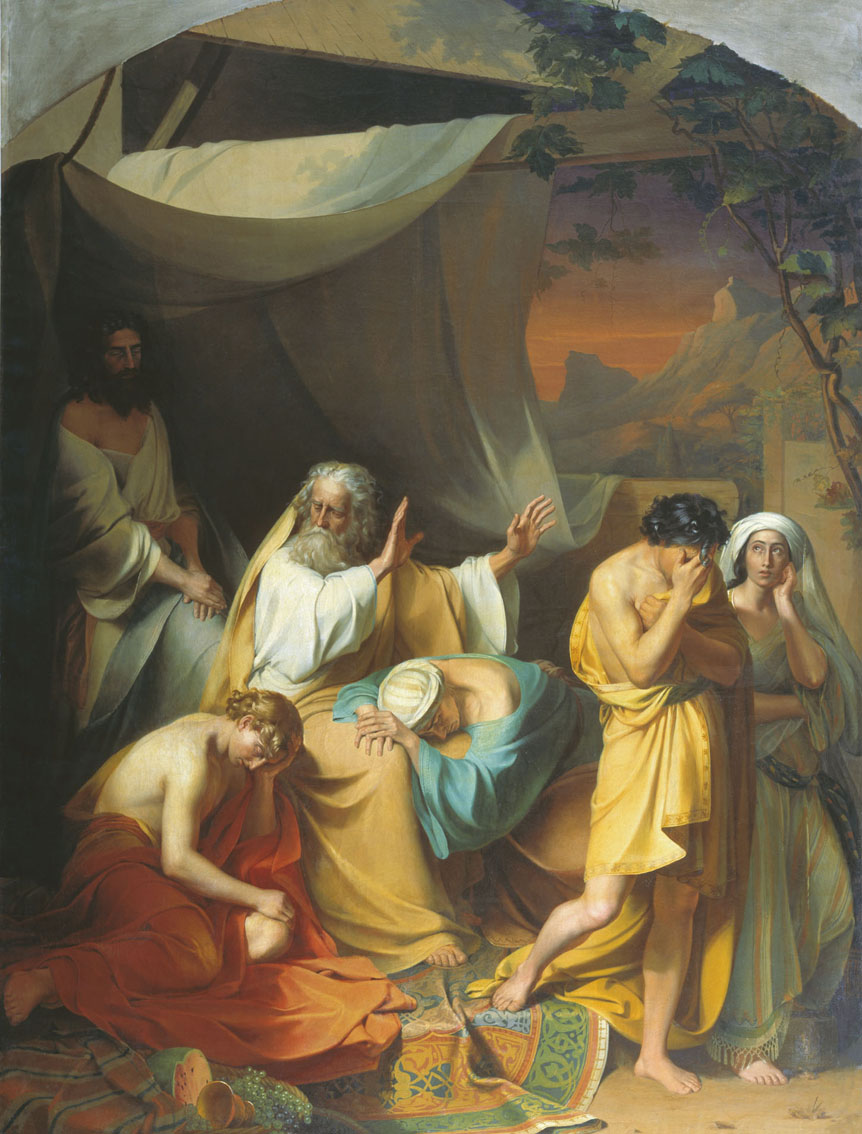
Joseph Smith justified slavery using the Curse of Ham.

Both Joseph Smith and Brigham Young referred to the Curse of Ham to justify slavery. According to the Bible, after Cain killed Abel, God cursed him and put a mark on him,(Genesis 4:8–15) although the Bible does not state the nature of the mark. In another biblical account, Ham discovered his father Noah drunk and naked in his tent. Because of this, Noah cursed Ham's son, Canaan to be "servants of servants".(Genesis 9:20–27) While nothing explicitly supports enslaving Black people, one interpretation that was popular in the United States during the Atlantic slave trade was that the mark of Cain was Black skin, and it was passed on through Canaan's descendants, who they believed were Black Africans. They argued that because Canaan was cursed to be servants of servants, then they were justified in enslaving Canaan's descendants. By the 1800s, this interpretation was widely accepted in America, including among Mormons. An assistant president of the church, W. W. Phelps, wrote in a letter that Ham's wife was a descendant of Cain, and that the Canaanites were Black and covered by both curses.

In June 1830, Joseph Smith began translating the Bible. Parts of it were canonized as the Book of Moses and accepted as official LDS scripture in 1880. It states that "the seed of Cain were black" (Moses 7:22). The Book of Moses also discusses a group of people called the Canaanites, who were also Black (Moses 7:8). These Canaanites lived before the flood, and hence before the Biblical Canaan. Later, in 1835, Smith produced a work called the Book of Abraham. It relates the story of Pharaoh, a descendant of Ham, who was also a Canaanite by birth. Pharaoh could not have the priesthood because he was "of that lineage by which he could not have the right of Priesthood,"(Abraham 1:27) and that all Egyptians descended from him (Abraham 1:22). The Book of Abraham also says the curse came from Noah (Abraham 1:26). This book was also later canonized as Mormon scripture.

In 1836, Smith taught that the Curse of Ham came from God, and that it demanded the legalization of slavery. He warned those who tried to interfere with slavery would face divine consequences. While Smith never reversed his opinion on the Curse of Ham, he did start expressing more anti-slavery positions. In 1844, Smith wrote his views as a candidate for president of the United States. The anti-slavery plank of his platform called for a gradual end to slavery by the year 1850. His plan called for the government to buy the freedom of enslaved people using money from the sale of public lands.

After the succession crisis, Brigham Young consistently argued slavery was a "divine institution", even after the Emancipation Proclamation was issued during the Civil War by President Abraham Lincoln. In the year following the Emancipation Proclamation, Young gave several discourses on slavery and characterized himself as neither an abolitionist nor a pro-slavery man. He based his position on the scriptural curses. He also used these curses to justify banning Black people from the priesthood and from holding public office. There is also evidence that Young believed in the racial superiority of white men. After Young, leaders did not use the curse of Cain to justify slavery, but this doctrine continued to be taught by President John Taylor and Bruce R. McConkie. The LDS Church today does not support slavery and disavows the theories advanced in the past that Black people's skin tone is a sign of divine disfavor or curse.

Most modern scholars believe "Canaanites" to refer to people of Semitic origin, not of Black African origin. Most Christian, Jewish and Muslim religions also reject the teaching that Canaanites were Black Africans.

=== Legality of slavery ===
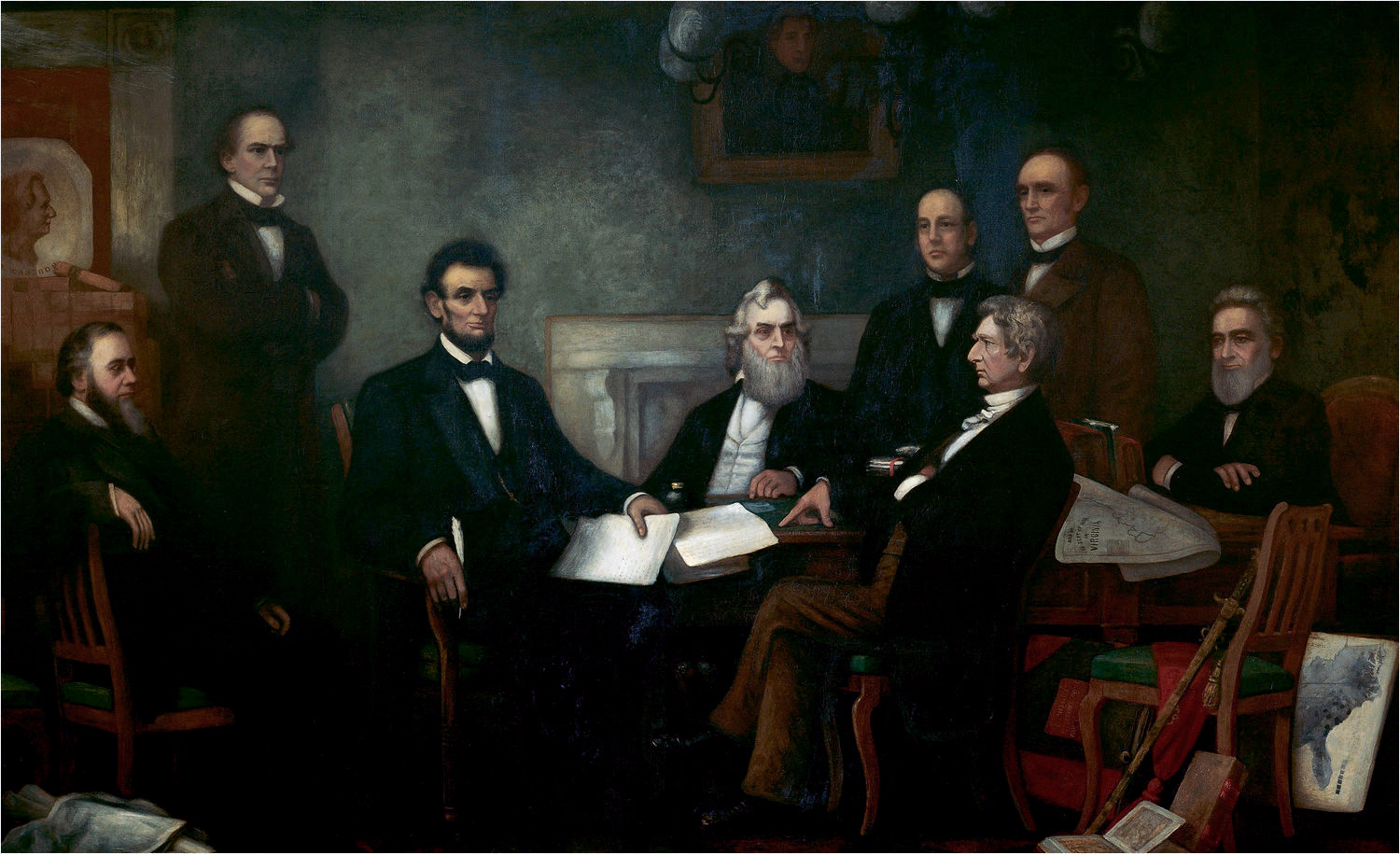
Young taught the Emancipation Proclamation went against the decrees of God and predicted it would eventually fail.

While Mormon scripture taught against slavery, it also taught the importance of upholding the law. Both Joseph Smith and Brigham Young stated that the Mormons were not abolitionists.

In the Book of Mormon, slavery was against the law.(Mosiah 2:13 & Alma 27:9) The Doctrine and Covenants teaches that "it is not right that any man should be in bondage to another" (D&C Section 101:79), but it is unclear whether it applied to Black servitude, since it was never used either for or against Black enslavement in early discourses on slavery. The official position which was more often cited was the belief that one should not interfere with enslaved people against the will of their enslavers, since it would cause unrest.(D&C Section 134:12) This explanation avoided taking a direct stance on slavery, and instead focused on following current laws. In general, Mormon teachings encouraged obeying, honoring and sustaining the laws of the land. (Articles of Faith 1:12)

In 1836, Smith wrote a piece in the Messenger and Advocate which supported slavery and affirmed that it was God's will. He said that the Northerners had no right to tell the Southerners whether they could enslave individuals. He said that if slavery were evil, southern "men of piety" would have objected. He expressed concern that freed former slaves would overrun the United States and violate chastity and virtue. He pointed to biblical stories of slavery, arguing that the prophets who enslaved people were inspired of God, and knew more than abolitionists. He said that Black people were under the curse of Ham to be servants, and warned those who sought to free enslaved Black individuals were going against the dictates of God. Warren Parrish and Oliver Cowdery made similar arguments. During this time the Mormons were based in the enslavement-permitting state of Missouri.

After the move to the free state of Illinois, Smith began expressing more abolitionist ideals. He argued that Black people should be given employment opportunities equal to white people. He believed that given equal chances as white people, Black people would become like white people. In his personal journal, he wrote that the enslaved people owned by Mormons should be brought "into a free country and set ... free— Educate them and give them equal rights." During Smith's 1844 campaign for president of the United States, he had advocated for the immediate abolition of slavery through compensation from money earned by the sale of public lands.

My cogitations, like Daniel's have for a long time troubled me, when I viewed the condition of men throughout the world, and more especially in this boasted realm, where the Declaration of Independence 'holds these truths to be self-evident, that all men are created equal; that they are endowed by their Creator with certain unalienable rights; that among these are life, liberty, and the pursuit of happiness;' but at the same time some two or three millions of people are held as slaves for life, because the spirit in them is covered with a darker skin than ours.

— History of the Church, Vol. 6, Ch. 8, p.197 - p.198

Smith was killed in 1844, the year of his presidential bid, resulting in a schism among his followers. After the schism, the Reorganized Church of Jesus Christ of Latter Day Saints (later known as the Community of Christ), one of the resulting sects, embraced abolitionist ideals. Its leader following the schism, Joseph Smith III, was a "devotee" of Abraham Lincoln and supported the Republicans' charge to end slavery.

Under Brigham Young, the LDS Church continued to teach that slavery was ordained of God. After he helped institute slavery in the Utah Territory, Young taught "inasmuch as we believe in the ordinances of God, in the Priesthood and order and decrees of God, we must believe in slavery". He argued that Black people needed to serve masters because they were not capable of ruling themselves. When enslaved Black individuals were treated less harshly by their enslavers, Young contended that they were much better off enslaved than free. Because of these benefits, Young argued that slavery brought the "true liberty" which God had designed. He taught that because slavery was decreed of God, man was not able to remove it. He criticized the Northerners for their attempts to free the enslaved people contrary to the will of God and accused them of worshiping Black people. He opposed the American Civil War, calling it useless and saying that "the cause of human improvement is not in the least advanced by the dreadful war which now convulses our unhappy country." After President Lincoln signed the Emancipation Proclamation, Young prophesied that the attempts to free enslaved people would eventually fail.

=== Relationship between enslavers and the enslaved ===
People who enslaved others complained that the Mormons were interfering in their relationship with their enslaved persons, but the LDS Church denied such claims. In 1835, the Church issued an official statement that, because the United States government allowed slavery, the Church would not "interfere with bond-servants, neither preach the gospel to, nor baptize them contrary to the will and wish of their masters, nor meddle with or influence them in the least to cause them to be dissatisfied with their situations in this life, thereby jeopardizing the lives of men." This was later adopted as scripture.(D&C Section 134:12) This policy was changed in 1836, when Smith wrote that enslaved persons should not be taught the gospel at all until after their enslavers were baptized.

Some church leaders stated that enslaved people should not be mistreated. In March 1842, Smith began to study some abolitionist literature, and stated, "it makes my blood boil within me to reflect upon the injustice, cruelty, and oppression of the rulers of the people. When will these things cease to be, and the Constitution and the laws again bear rule?" Young urged moderation in enslavement, not to treat Africans as beasts of the field, nor to elevate them to equality with white people, which was against God's will. He criticized Southerners for abusing enslaved people, and taught that mistreating enslaved people should be against the law: "If the Government of the United States, in Congress assembled, had the right to pass an anti-polygamy bill, they had also the right to pass a law that enslaved people should not be abused as they have been; they had also a right to make a law that negroes should be used like human beings, and not worse than dumb brutes. For their abuse of that race, the whites will be cursed, unless they repent." Later, as Utah sovereignty became a larger political issue, Young changed his stance on the role of the federal government in preventing abuse, arguing against federal meddling in a State's sovereignty by stating "even if we treated our slaves in an oppressive manner, it is none of their business and they ought not to meddle with it."

== In early Mormonism ==
Initially, Church leaders avoided the topic of slavery. Most of the early converts of the church came from the northern United States and tended to be anti-slavery. These attitudes came into conflict with Southerners after they moved to Missouri. In the summer of 1833 W. W. Phelps published an article in the church's newspaper, seeming to invite free Black people into the state to become Mormons, and reflecting "in connection with the wonderful events of this age, much is doing towards abolishing slavery, and colonizing the blacks, in Africa." Outrage followed Phelps' comments, and he was forced to reverse his position. He said he was "misunderstood" and that free Black people would not be admitted into the Church. His reversal did not end the controversy. Missouri citizens accused Mormons of trying to interfere with their enslavement of people. The Church denied such claims and began to teach against interfering with enslavement and more pro-slavery rhetoric. Some enslavers joined the church during this period. However, this did not end the controversy, and the church was forcibly expelled from Missouri.

By 1836, the church already had some enslaved people and their enslavers as members. The rules established by the church for governing assemblies in the Kirtland Temple included attendees who were "bond or free, black or white". When abolitionists tried to solicit support from the Mormons, they had little success. Even though Illinois prohibited slavery, members who enslaved people took them along on the migration to Nauvoo. Nauvoo was reported to have 22 Black members, including free and enslaved, between 1839–1843. The state of Illinois did not pass laws to free already present enslaved people in the region for some time.

One family of enslavers in Nauvoo was the Flake family. They enslaved a man named Green Flake. While building the Nauvoo Temple, families were asked to donate one day in ten to work on the temple. The Flake family used Green's forced labor to fulfill their tithing requirement.

== In The Church of Jesus Christ of Latter-day Saints ==
After Smith's death in 1844, the church went through a succession crisis, and split into multiple groups. The main body of the church, which would become the LDS Church, followed Brigham Young who was significantly more pro-slavery than Smith. Young led the Mormons to Utah and formed a theodemocratic government, under which slavery was legalized and the trafficking of enslaved Native American individuals was supported. Young promoted slavery, teaching that Black people had been cursed to be "servants of servants" and that Indigenous Americans needed to be enslaved as part of a process of overcoming a curse placed on their Lamanite ancestors.

=== Slavery during the westward migration ===
When church leaders asked for men from the members of Mississippi to help with the westward emigration, they sent four enslaved persons with John Brown who was given the task to "take charge of them". Two of those people died, but Green Flake later joined the company, making it a total of three enslaved people arriving in Utah. More enslaved people arrived as property of members in later companies. By 1850, one hundred Black people had arrived, the majority of whom were enslaved. Some enslaved individuals escaped during the trek west, including one large contingent that escaped the Redd family during the night in Kansas, but six of those enslaved by that family were not able to escape and were forced to continue with the family to Utah Territory. When William Dennis stopped in Tabor, Iowa, members of the Underground Railroad helped five people he was enslaving escape, and despite a manhunt, they were able to reach freedom in Canada.

=== Ambiguous period (1847–1852) ===
Mormons arrived in Utah in the middle of the Mexican–American War; they ignored the Mexican ban on slavery. Instead, they recognized slavery as custom and consistent with the Mormon view on Black people.

After the Compromise of 1850, Congress granted the Utah Territory the right to decide whether it would allow slavery based on popular sovereignty. Many prominent members of the church were enslavers, including Abraham O. Smoot and Charles C. Rich.

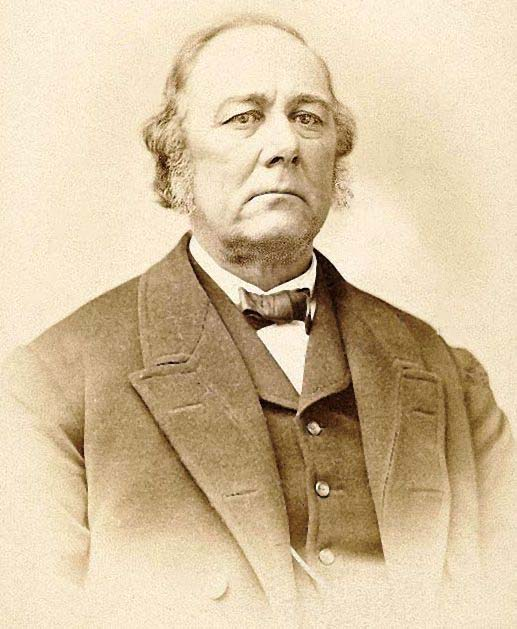
Apostle Charles C. Rich, a prominent Mormon enslaver

The territory did not pass any laws defining the legality of slavery, and the LDS Church tried to remain neutral. In 1851, apostle Orson Hyde said that because many church members were enslavers coming from the South, that the church's position on the matter needed to be defined. He went on to say that there was no law in Utah prohibiting or authorizing slavery and that the decisions on the topic were to remain between enslaved individuals and their traffickers. He also clarified that individuals' choices on the matter were not in any way a reflection of the church as a whole or its doctrine.

Once in Utah, Mormons continued to participate in the trafficking of enslaved people. Some Church members had their enslaved people perform labor required for tithing, and sometimes donated them to the church as property. Both Young and Heber C. Kimball used the forced labor from enslaved people that had been donated in tithing by enslavers before later freeing the enslaved individuals.

==== In San Bernardino (1851–1856) ====
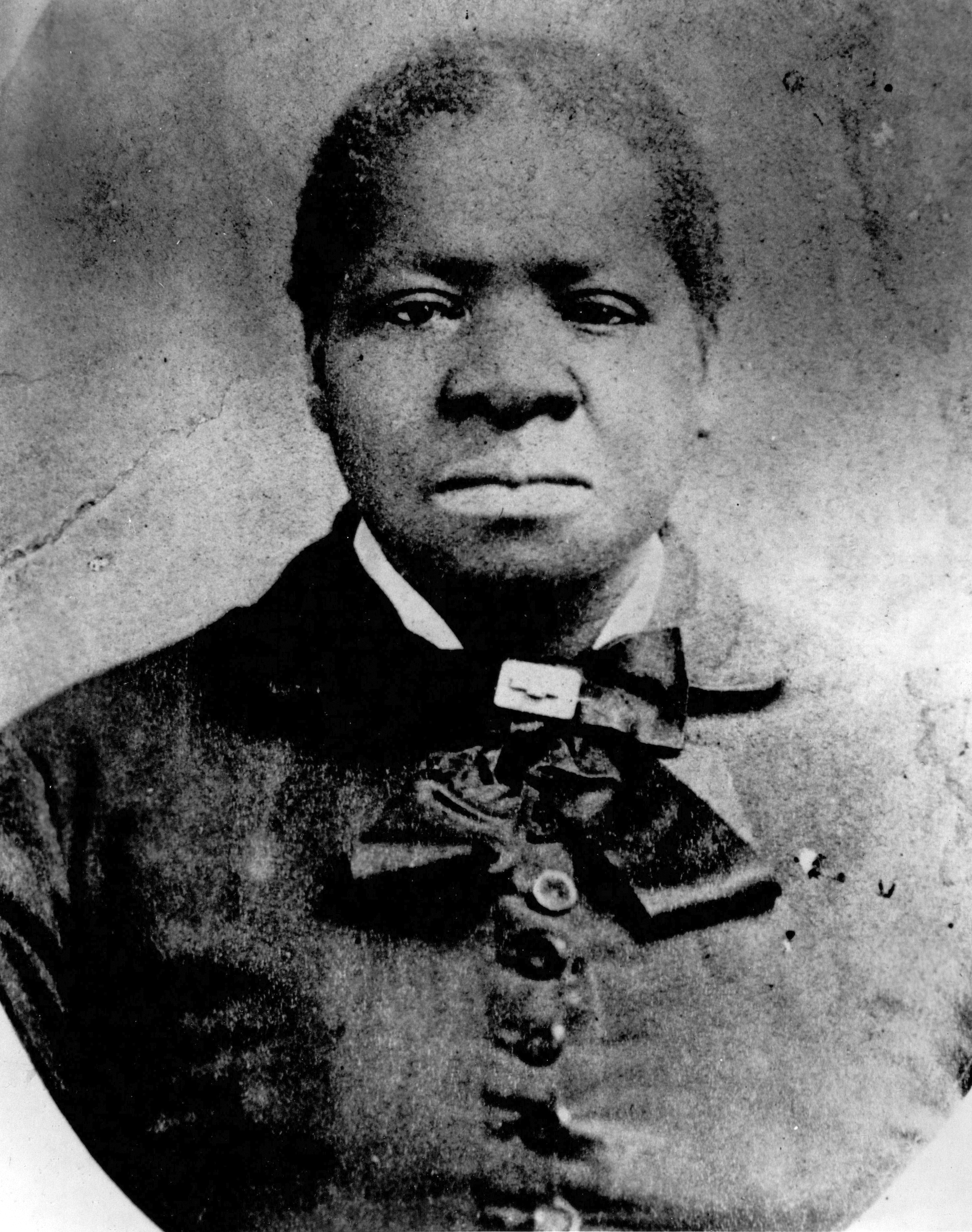
Biddy Mason was one of 14 Black individuals who sued for freedom after being illegally held captive in San Bernardino.

In 1851, a company of 437 Mormons under direction of Amasa M. Lyman and Charles C. Rich of the Quorum of the Twelve Apostles settled at what is now San Bernardino, California. This first company took 26 enslaved people, and more were brought over as San Bernardino continued to grow. Since California did not allow enslavement, enslaved people should have been freed when they entered. However, enslaving people was openly tolerated in San Bernardino. Many if not all enslaved persons wanted to be free, but were still under the control of their enslavers, without resources, and ignorant of the laws and their rights. Judge Benjamin Hayes freed 14 people enslaved by Robert Smith. Other enslavers let their captives go.

=== Legal period (1852–1862) ===
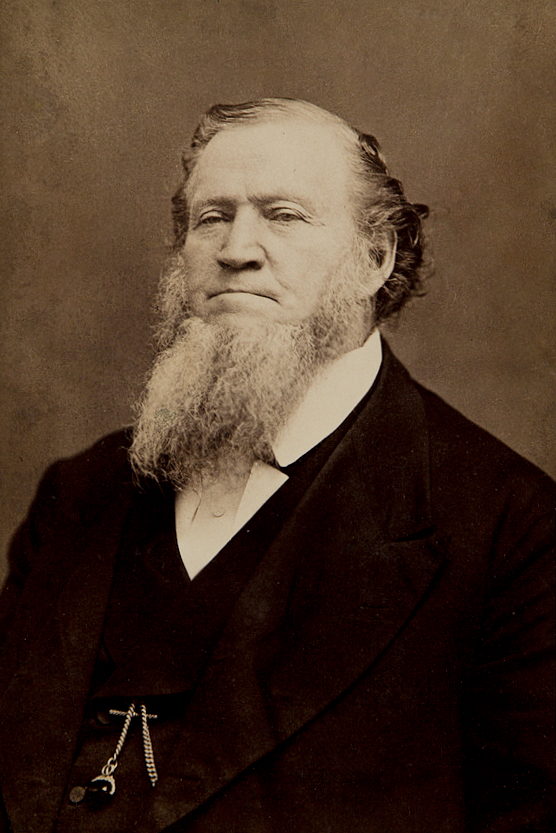
Brigham Young promoted slavery as a consequence of the Curse of Ham.

One of the Mexican slave traffickers, Don Pedro Leon Lujan, was charged with trading with Indigenous Americans without a license, including the sale of enslaved Native Americans. His property was seized and those he enslaved distributed to Mormon families in Manti. He sued the government, charging that he received unequal treatment because he was not Mormon. The courts sided against him, but noted that Indigenous enslavement had never been officially legalized in Utah.

On January 5, 1852, Young, who was also Territorial Governor of Utah, addressed the joint session of the Utah Territorial Legislature. He discussed the ongoing trial of Don Pedro Leon Lujan and the importance of explicitly indicating the true policy for slavery in Utah. He explained that although he did not think people should be treated as property, he felt because Native people were so low and degraded, that transferring them to "the more favored portions of the human race", would be a benefit and relief. He said this was superior to drudgery of Mexican slavery, because the Mexicans were "scarcely superior" to the Indigenous Americans. He argued that it is proper for persons thus purchased to owe a debt to the man or woman who saved them, and that it was "necessary that some law should provide for the suitable regulations under which all such indebtedness should be defrayed". He argued that this type of service was necessary and honorable to improve the condition of Native Americans.

He also supported African slavery and said that "Inasmuch as we believe in the Bible, inasmuch as we believe in the ordinances of God, in the Priesthood and order and decrees of God, we must believe in slavery." He argued that Black people had the Curse of Ham placed on them which made them servants of servants and that he was not authorized to remove it. He also argued that they needed to serve masters because they are not capable of ruling themselves, and that when treated less harshly by their enslavers, Black people were much better off enslaved than free. However, he urged moderation, not to treat Africans as beasts of the field, nor to elevate them to equality with white people, which he believed was against the will of God. He said that this was the principle of true liberty according to the designs of God. On January 27, Orson Pratt objected to Young's remarks, saying it was not man's duty to enforce Cain's curse, and that slavery had not been authorized by God. Young responded that the Lord had revealed these instructions to him. After this, the Utah legislature passed an Act in Relation to Service, which officially legalized slavery in Utah Territory, and a month later passed an Act for the relief of Indian Slaves and Prisoners, which specifically enshrined Indigenous enslavement.

The acts had a few special provisions unique to slavery in Utah, reflecting Mormon beliefs. Enslavers were required by law to correct and punish the people they enslaved, which particularly worried Republicans in Congress. Territory laws stated that Black people who were enslaved and brought into the Territory had to come "of their own free will and choice"; and they could not be sold to a different enslaver or forced from the Territory against their will, though how one measured the consent and free will of an enslaved person was not made clear. Enslaved Native people just had to be in the possession of a white person, which Republicans in Congress complained was too broad. Indigenous American enslavement was limited to twenty years, while Black enslavement was limited to not be longer "than will satisfy the debt due his [master]." Several unique provisions were included which terminated the enslaver's contract in the event that the enslaver neglected to feed, clothe, shelter, or otherwise abused the slave beyond a certain extent, or attempted to take them from the Territory against their will. Black people in slavery, but not Indigenous people, were released if their enslaver had sexual intercourse with (i.e. raped) them. Some schooling was also required for enslaved persons, with Black individuals requiring less schooling than Native American people. White LDS apostle Orson Hyde wrote in a church newspaper in 1851 that all those Black and Indigenous people enslaved by white people in the Utah Territory appeared "perfectly contented and satisfied". However, a Black-owned newspaper reported the recollection of Alexander Bankhead who had been brought to Utah by his enslaver and reported that during his previous meetings with fellow enslaved Black people in Salt Lake City he learned they were "far from happy" and longed for their freedom, and that "many of them were subjected to the same treatment that was accorded the plantation negroes of the South".

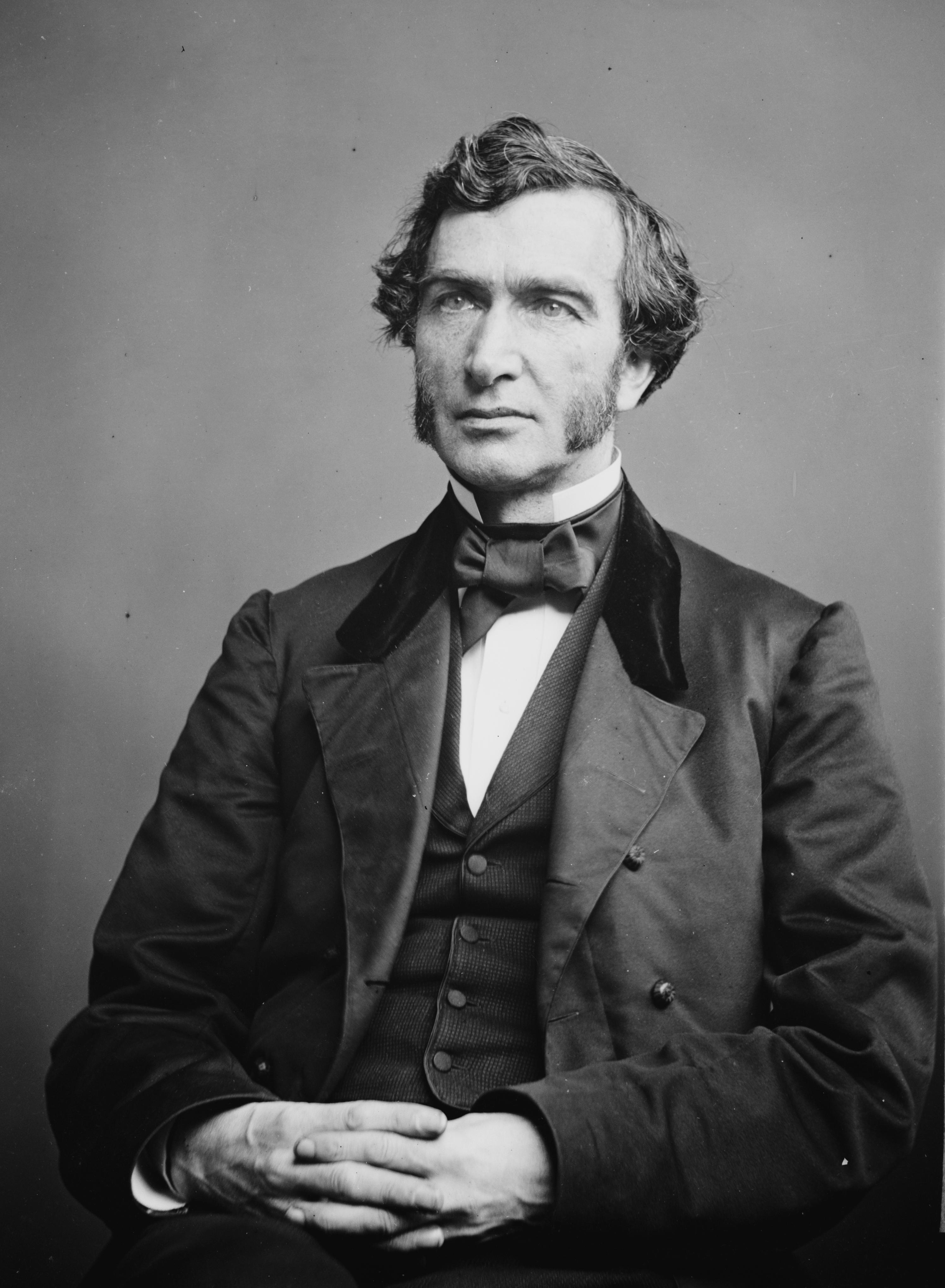
Justin Smith Morrill opposed the Mormon belief in slavery.

Mormons continued taking Native children from Indigenous families long after the slave traders left, and even began to actively solicit children from Paiute parents. They also began trafficking Indigenous people to each other. By 1853, each of the hundred households in Parowan had one or more Paiute children. Enslaved Indigenous people were used for both domestic and manual labor. In 1857, Representative Justin Smith Morrill estimated that there were 400 enslaved Native people in Utah. Richard Kitchen has identified at least 400 Indigenous individuals taken into Mormon homes, but estimates even more went unrecorded because of the high mortality rate of enslaved Indigenous Americans. Many of them tried to escape.

Brigham Young sided with enslavers on the topic of capturing those trying to escape enslavement. This was enforced by Utah laws. When Dan tried to escape his enslaver William Camp, the courts upheld that Dan was Camp's property and could not escape. Dan was later sold to another enslaver for $800 and later to another.

The Mormon position on enslavement was often criticized and condemned by anti-slavery groups. In 1856, the key plank of the Republican Party's platform was "to prohibit in the territories those twin relics of barbarism, polygamy and slavery". While considering appropriations for Utah Territory, Representative Justin Smith Morrill criticized the LDS Church for its laws on slavery. He said that under the Mormon patriarchy, slavery took a new shape. He criticized the use of the term "servant" instead of "slave" and the requirement for Mormon enslavers to "correct and punish" their "servants". He expressed concern that Mormons might be trying to increase the number of enslaved people in the state. Horace Greeley also criticized the Mormon position on slavery and general apathy towards the welfare of Black people.

=== Native American enslavement ===
According to historian Andres Resendez, one of Smith's successors Brigham Young and other LDS leaders in Utah Territory leaders "did not so much want to do away with Indian slavery as to use it for their own ends." Young officially legalized Indigenous American slavery in the Utah Territory in 1852 with each purchased Native person allowed to be held up to twenty years in indentured servitude. Children between seven and sixteen years old were supposed to be sent to school three months of the year, but were otherwise put to work. Soon after Mormons colonized the Salt Lake Valley in 1847 the trafficking of enslaved children became a vital source of labor, and children were exchanged as gifts. Within a decade of settling the Salt Lake Valley over 400 Indigenous American children were purchased and lived in Mormon homes. In 1849 a posse of around 100 LDS men in southern Utah chased and killed twenty-five Native American men in retaliation for some cattle raids, and enslaved their women and children.

As historian Max Perry Mueller has written, the Mormons participated extensively in the trafficking of enslaved Native people as part of their efforts to convert and control Utah's Indigenous population. Mormons also were confronted in Utah with the trafficking of enslaved Indigenous people among regional tribes; it was very prevalent in the area. Tribes often took captives from enemies in raids or warfare, and enslaved or sold them. As the Mormons continued expanding further into Indigenous lands, they often had conflicts with the local residents. After expanding into Utah Valley, Young issued the extermination order against the Timpanogos, resulting in the Battle at Fort Utah. The Mormons took many Timpanogos women and children into slavery. Some were able to escape, but many died in slavery. After expanding into Parowan, Mormons attacked a group of Native people, killing around 25 men and enslaving the women and children.

At the encouragement of Mormon leaders, their pioneers started participating in the trade of enslaved Indigenous persons. Chief Walkara, one of the main slave traffickers in the region, was baptized in the church. In 1851, Apostle George A. Smith gave Chief Peteetneet and Walkara talking papers that certified "it is my desire that they should be treated as friends, and as they wish to Trade horses, Buckskins and Piede children, we hope them success and prosperity and good bargains."

As in other regions in the Southwest, the Mormons justified enslaving Native people in order to teach them Christianity and achieve their salvation. Mormon theology teaches that Indigenous Americans are descendants in part from the Lamanites, an ancient group of people described in the Book of Mormon that had fallen into apostasy and had been cursed. When Young visited the members in Parowan, he encouraged them to "buy up the Lamanite children as fast as they could". He argued that by doing so, they could educate them and teach them the Gospel, and in a few generations the Lamanites would become "white and delightsome", as prophesied in Nephi.

The Mormons strongly opposed the New Mexican slave trade. Young sought to put an end to Mexican trafficking of enslaved people. Many of Walkara's band were upset by the interference with the Mexican slave trade. In one graphic incident, Ute Chief Arrapine, a brother of Walkara, insisted that because the Mormons had stopped the Mexicans from buying certain children, the Mormons were obligated to purchase them. In his book, Forty Years Among the Indians, Daniel Jones wrote, "[s]everal of us were present when he took one of these children by the heels and dashed its brains out on the hard ground, after which he threw the body towards us, telling us we had no hearts, or we would have bought it and saved its life."

=== Emancipation (1862–present) ===
When the American Civil War broke out, there is some indication that some Mormon enslavers of Black people returned to southern states because they were worried that they would lose the people they kept enslaved. On June 19, 1862 Congress prohibited slavery in all US territories, and on January 1, 1863, Abraham Lincoln issued the Emancipation Proclamation. Those enslaved by Mormons were incredibly joyful when the news reached that they were free, and many left Utah for other states, particularly California.

After enslavement was banned, Young gave several discourses on slavery. He characterized himself as neither an abolitionist nor a pro-slavery man. He criticized both the South for their abuse of Black people they enslaved and the North for their alleged worshiping of Black people. He opposed the American Civil War, calling it useless and that the "cause of human improvement is not in the least advanced" by fighting such a war. He predicted the Emancipation Proclamation would fail. Slavery remained allowed under the Constitution of Utah as punishment for a crime until the constitution was amended by vote in 2020 with support from the LDS Church.

=== Evaluations by historians ===
Leaders of the church have had varying opinions on slavery, and many Mormon historians have discussed the issue.

Harris and Bringhurst noted that early Mormons wanted to stay neutral or aloof of slavery as a political issue, probably because of the strong Mormon presence in Missouri, which was then a Black-enslavement-permitting state. In 1833, Joseph Smith stated that "it is not right that any man should be in bondage one to another", but most historians agree that this statement referred to debt and other types of economic bondage. In 1835, Joseph Smith wrote that missionaries should not baptize enslaved persons against the will of their enslavers. According to Harris and Bringhurst, Joseph Smith made these statements to distance the church from abolitionism, and not to align with pro-slavery positions, but it came across as supporting slavery. Church headquarters were in Ohio, where abolitionism and anti-abolitionism polarized many citizens. After members of the church were expelled from Missouri to Illinois, Smith changed to an anti-slavery position, which he held until his death in 1844. More new converts were from free states and a handful of Black people joined the church, which may have contributed to Smith's change in position.

John G. Turner writes that Brigham Young's stance on slavery was contradictory. In 1851 he opposed abolitionism, seeing it as politically radical, yet he did not want to "lay a foundation" for slavery. In an 1852 speech, Young was against slavery, but also against equal rights for Black people. Two weeks after the speech, Young pushed to have slavery formally recognized in the Utah territory, stating that he was for slavery, and said that a belief in slavery naturally followed from believing in God's priesthood and decrees. Young mimicked pro-slavery apologetics when he argued that enslaved persons were better off than European workers and that enslavement was mutually beneficial to the enslaved and the enslaver. Young feared that abolishing Black enslavement would result in Black people ruling over white people. At the end of 1852, Young commented that he was glad the number of Black people in the Utah territory was small. Young was generous with the Black servants and enslaved people in his life, but that did not change their lack of rights. According to Turner, Young's position on slavery was unsurprising given the racial context of the time, as discrimination was common in white American Protestant groups. Turner does state that Young's theological justification for racial discrimination set a discriminatory precedent that his successors believed they should perpetuate.

According to W. Paul Reeve, Brigham Young was the driving force behind the 1852 legislation to solidify slavery in the Utah territory, and that the common fear of "interracial mixing" motivated Young. Reeve also states that Mormons were surprised by the Native American slave trade among the Utes. The traffickers would insist that the Mormon settlers buy enslaved Indigenous persons, sometimes killing a child to motivate their purchase. The 1852 law tried to change enslavement into indentured servitude, requiring Mormons with Native American children to register them with their local judge and provide some education for them; the law did not work well in practice. Reeve said that while Joseph Smith saw a potential for Black equality, Young believed that Black people were inferior to white people by divine design.

== In the Community of Christ ==
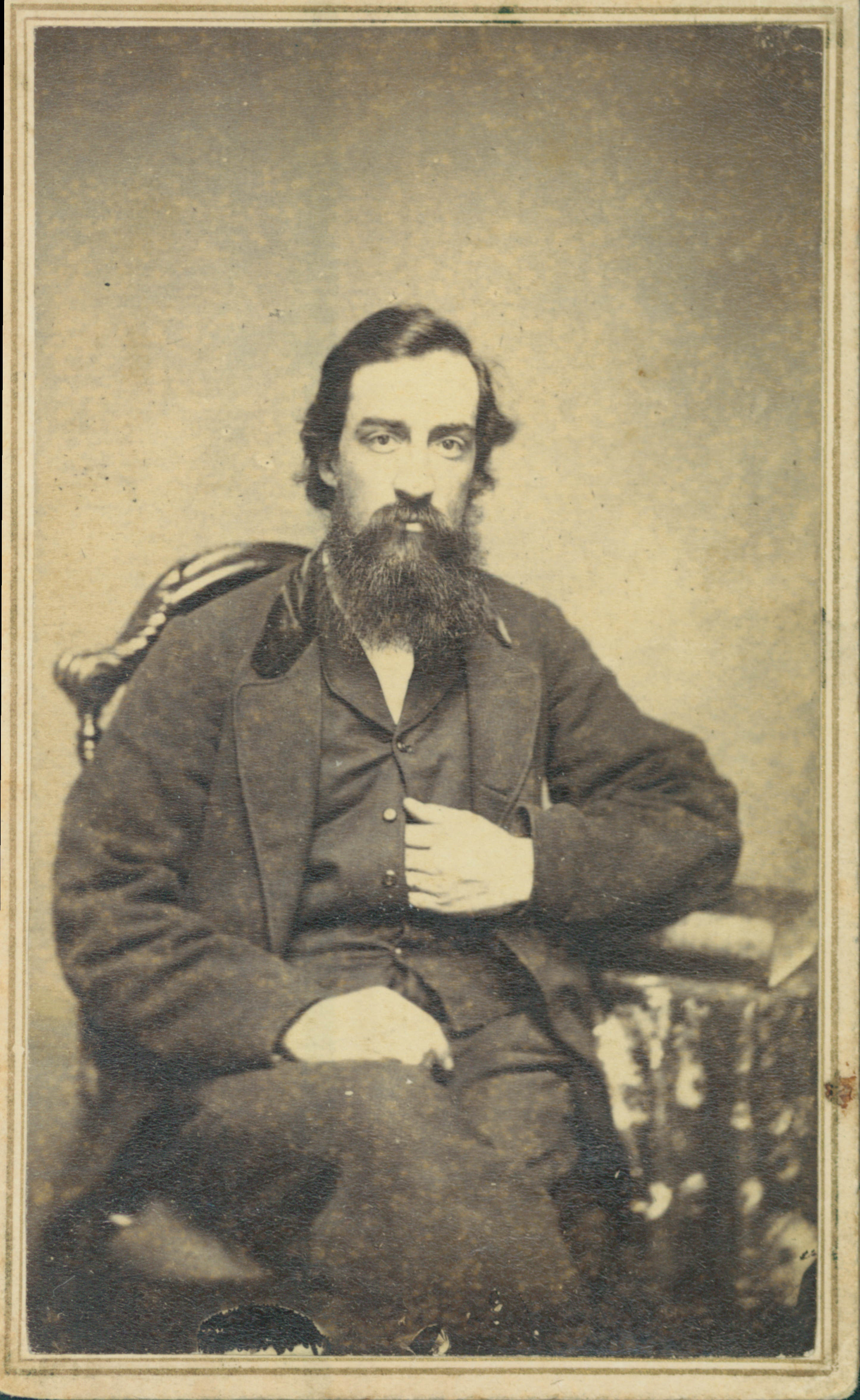
Joseph Smith III opposed slavery.

Joseph Smith III, son of Joseph Smith, founded the Reorganized Church of Jesus Christ of Latter Day Saints in 1860, now known as the Community of Christ. Smith III was a vocal advocate of abolishing the slave trade, and followed Owen Lovejoy, an anti-slavery congressman from Illinois, and Abraham Lincoln. He joined the Republican party and advocated for their anti-slavery politics. He rejected the Fugitive Slave Act of 1850, and openly stated that he would assist people trying to escape enslavement. While he was a strong opponent of slavery, he still viewed white people as superior to Black people, and held that they must not "sacrifice the dignity, honor and prestige that may be rightfully attached to the ruling races."

== In the Fundamentalist Church of Jesus Christ of Latter-Day Saints ==
The Fundamentalist Church of Jesus Christ of Latter-Day Saints (FLDS Church) broke from the LDS Church in the early 20th century. Although it emerged well after slavery was made illegal in the United States, there have been several accusations of slavery. On April 20, 2015, the U.S. Department of Labor assessed fines totaling $1.96 million against a group of FLDS Church members, including Lyle Jeffs, a brother of the church's controversial leader, Warren Jeffs, for alleged child enslavement labor violations during the church's 2012 pecan harvest at an orchard near Hurricane, Utah. The church has been suspected of trafficking underage girls across state lines, as well as across the US–Canada and US–Mexico borders, for the purpose of sometimes involuntary plural marriage and sexual slavery. The FLDS is suspected by the Royal Canadian Mounted Police of having trafficked more than 30 under-age girls from Canada to the United States between the late 1990s and 2006 to be entered into polygamous marriages. RCMP spokesman Dan Moskaluk said of the FLDS's activities: "In essence, it's human trafficking in connection with illicit sexual activity." According to the Vancouver Sun, it is unclear whether or not Canada's anti-human trafficking statute can be effectively applied against the FLDS's pre-2005 activities, because the statute may not be able to be applied retroactively. An earlier three-year-long investigation by local authorities in British Columbia into allegations of sexual abuse, human trafficking, and forced marriages by the FLDS resulted in no charges, but did result in legislative change.

== See also ==
- Christian views on slavery
- Catholic Church and slavery
- History of slavery in Utah
- The Bible and slavery
- Black people and Mormonism
- Slavery and religion
