= Egyptus =

Female character in the Book of Abraham

In Latter-day Saint theology, Egyptus (/iːˈdʒɪptʌs/) is the name of two women in the Book of Abraham in the Pearl of Great Price. One is the wife of Ham, son of Noah, who bears his children. The other is their daughter, who discovered Egypt while "it was under water" (1:23-24). Three 1835 pre-publication manuscripts of the Book of Abraham, in place of "Egyptus", read Zeptah for the elder Egyptus and Egyptes for the younger Egyptus.

The younger Egyptus places her eldest son on the throne as Pharaoh, the first king of Egypt (1:25). Pharaoh was a descendant of the Canaanites (1:22), a race of people who had a black skin come upon them (Moses 7:8). Some early Mormon leaders have taught that Egyptus passed black skin and the curse of Cain through the flood so that the devil might have representation upon the earth, although this has now been repudiated by later leaders.

The word Egyptus is considered to be an anachronism in the Book of Abraham among non-Mormon Egyptologists and historians, since the origin of term "Egypt" is believed to have come from another source much later in history than the time of the narrative described in the Book of Abraham. The word "pharaoh" is also considered to be an anachronism in the Book of Abraham for similar reasons.

== The Curse of Cain ==
W. W. Phelps, a counselor in the presidency of the church, was the first in the church to teach that Ham's wife was black because she was under the curse of Cain. In 1835, he taught that Ham himself was cursed because he had married a black wife. Brigham Young also taught that Egyptus was under the curse of Cain and passed the curse through the flood. In April 1836, within months of translating the Book of Abraham verses, Joseph Smith himself taught in reference to Genesis 9:25–27, "it remains as a lasting monument of the decree of Jehovah, to the shame and confusion of all who have cried out against the South, in consequence of their holding the sons of Ham in servitude!". John Taylor explained that it was necessary that the curse of Cain was passed through Egyptus so that "the devil should have a representation upon the earth as well as God".

Like many Americans, many Mormons of the 19th century accepted the idea promoted in slavery states that black Africans had Cain's "mark" of black skin, and Ham's curse to be servants of servants. These ideas were eventually abandoned by later church leaders as unsupported by scripture.

== See also ==
- Anachronisms in the Book of Abraham
- Interracial marriage and The Church of Jesus Christ of Latter-day Saints
- List of names for the biblical nameless
- Wives aboard Noah's Ark
