= Pharaoh (Book of Abraham) =

First king of Egypt according to Latter-day Saints

In the Latter Day Saint scripture the Book of Abraham, Pharaoh is the title of the first king of Egypt, and is referred to by his title since his name is never specified. He was the eldest son of Egyptus, who was the daughter of Ham, and a descendant of the Canaanites. According to the story, all Egyptians descended from Ham. The Canaanites were a race of people who had been cursed according to Latter Day Saint theology. Some members and leaders of the Church of Jesus Christ of Latter-day Saints (LDS Church) taught that Pharaoh inherited the curse of Cain due to his Caananite ancestry, so that "the devil might have representation upon the earth", but these teachings are considered unofficial.

== Anachronism ==
The use of the term Pharaoh is considered anachronistic during Abraham's time by scholars, including LDS Scholars. Kevin A. Barney, writing in Astronomy, Papyrus, and Covenant for Brigham Young University, suggests that it is possible that a hypothetical Jewish redactor replaced the original words with wording that would have been more understandable to his day.

Other apologists have suggested that any number of copyists or redactors over the years before the document came to be in Joseph Smith's possession may have updated the original words used to refer to the king to Pharaoh, or Joseph may simply have translated the original words as Pharaoh because of his familiarity with the term.
