= Act for the relief of Indian Slaves and Prisoners =

The Act for the relief of Indian Slaves and Prisoners, which was passed on March 7, 1852, in the Utah Territory, dealt with Native American slavery. A similar law, the Act in Relation to Service, which had made slavery legal in the territory, had been passed on February 4, 1852.

== Background ==
Although illegal throughout Mexico, the enslavement of Native Americans was well-established when the Mormon pioneers arrived in Utah. At the encouragement of Mormon leaders, the Mormon pioneers began buying enslaved Native Americans. They also enslaved other prisoners through wars such as Battle at Fort Utah. At the end of the Mexican–American War, Utah became a part of the United States, and the issue of slavery in the new territories became a highly political subject. Finally, Congress passed the Compromise of 1850, which allowed the Territories of Utah and New Mexico to choose by popular sovereignty whether to legalize slavery in those territories. Brigham Young began seeking to stop the Mexican slave trade but to encourage the local market, and he notified the Mexicans.

Many of Walker's Band were upset by the interruption of the Mexican slave trade. In one graphic incident, Ute Indian Chief Arrapine, a brother of Chief Walkara, insisted that because the Mormons had stopped the Mexicans from buying the children, the Mormons were obligated to purchase them. In his book, Forty Years Among the Indians, Daniel Jones wrote, "Several of us were present when he took one of these children by the heels and dashed its brains out on the hard ground, after which he threw the body towards us, telling us we had no hearts, or we would have bought it and saved its life."

In 1851, Don Pedro Leon Lujan, who had been trading enslaved people with a New Mexico license, sought a Utah license from Brigham Young but was refused. Later, Lujan was discovered with enslaved Native Americans and charged with trading with Native Americans without a license. The trial was in progress, and the ambiguous status of slavery had become an issue during the trial.

== Motives ==
Mormons supported enslaving people for their labor but opposed the harsher conditions of slavery in Mexico.

On January 5, 1852, Brigham Young addressed the joint session of the Utah Territory legislature. He discussed the ongoing trial of Don Pedro Leon Lujan and the importance of explicitly indicating the true policy for slavery in Utah. Young explained that although he did not think people should be treated as property, he felt that Native Americans were so low and degraded that transferring them to "the more favored portions of the human race" would be a benefit and relief. Young argued that it was proper for persons thus purchased to owe a debt to the man or woman who saved them, and that it was "necessary that some law should provide for the suitable regulations under which all such indebtedness should be defrayed." Young said that was superior to the drudgery of Mexican slavery because the Mexicans were "scarcely superior" to the Native Americans. Young argued that type of service was necessary and honorable to improve the condition of Native Americans.

== Details ==
The Legislative Assembly of the Territory of Utah legalized slavery in February 1852 and dealt with the enslavement of Native Americans in March 1852. The Act had four sections.

The first section required a Native American to be enslaved by a white person and to be a prisoner, woman, or child. The prospective enslaver would bring the enslaved person to the probate judge, who was then required to verify the enslaver was "properly qualified to raise or retain said Indian." If approved, the enslaved person was then bound for up to twenty years, which could be renewed.

The second section mandated the probate officer to record the enslaved person's name, age, place of birth, name of parents, tribe, enslaver, name of slave trader, and date of being bound.

The third section gave the probate officer power to imprison additional Native Americans and find enslavers for them.

The fourth section required enslavers to send children between the ages of seven and sixteen years to school for a period of three months each year if a school was available. Enslavers were also required to clothe them "in a comfortable and becoming manner, according to his, said master's, condition in life." Enslavers were answerable to the probate judge for the treatment of these enslaved people.

The total education requirement was significantly greater than for enslaved Black people and slightly less than indentured white people, whose enslavers were required to send them to school at age six.

== Effects ==
As a result of the Act, many Mormon families took small Native American children into their homes with the excuse that it was to protect them from Mexican slavery or from being left destitute. John D. Lee, for example, wrote in his journal about a group of Native Americans who "brought me two more girls for which I gave them two horses. I named the girls Annette and Elnora."

The Act concerned the Republican Party, which had made anti-slavery one of the pillars of its platform. While considering appropriations for Utah Territory, US Representative Justin Smith Morrill criticized the Church of Jesus Christ of Latter-day Saints for its laws on the enslavement of Native Americans. Morrill said that the laws were unconcerned about the way Utahns enslaved Native Americans and noted that the only requirement was for a Native American to be enslaved by a white person through purchase or otherwise. He said that Utah was the only American government to enslave Native Americans and that state-sanctioned slavery was "a dreg placed at the bottom of the cup by Utah alone." The Republicans' abhorrence of slavery delayed Utah's entrance as a state into the United States.

In 1857, Representative Morrill estimated that there were 400 enslaved Native Americans in Utah. Richard Kitchen has identified at least 400 enslaved Native Americans taken into Mormon homes. Still, estimates are that even more went unrecorded because of the high mortality rate of enslaved Native Americans. Many of them tried to escape.

== Similar acts ==
On the following day, March 8, 1852, the Legislative Assembly of the Territory of Utah passed an act concerning the assembling of Native Americans, which prohibited the assembling of Native Americans near white settlements.

== See also ==
- Slavery among Native Americans in the United States
- Utah in the American Civil War
- Slave Trade Acts
- History of slavery in Utah
- Mormonism and slavery
