= Act in Relation to Service =

1852 law making slavery legal in the Utah Territory

The Act in Relation to Service, which was passed on February 4, 1852, in the Utah Territory, made slavery legal in the territory. A similar law, Act for the relief of Indian Slaves and Prisoners was passed on March 7, 1852, and specifically dealt with Indian slavery.

== Background ==
African slaves were first brought into Utah in 1847 by Mormon Pioneers. At the time, slavery was illegal in Mexico, but became de facto law, based on Mormon acceptance of slavery. Several prominent Mormon leaders had slaves, including Charles C. Rich, Abraham O. Smoot and William H. Hooper. Also, they had begun to acquire Indian slaves, through purchase or through wars. At the end of the Mexican–American War, Utah became a part of the United States, and the issue of slavery in the new territories became a highly political subject. Finally, members of Congress passed the Compromise of 1850, which allowed the Territories of Utah and New Mexico to choose by popular sovereignty whether to make slavery legal in those territories. Still, no law was made on slavery. At the end of 1851, Don Pedro Leon Lujan was charged with trading with Indians without a license, including Indians slaves. The trial was in progress and the ambiguous status of slavery had become an issue in the trial.

== Drafting ==
On January 5, 1852, Brigham Young, Territorial Governor of Utah, addressed the joint session of the Utah Territory legislature. He discussed the ongoing trial of Don Pedro Leon Lujan and the importance of explicitly indicating the true policy for slavery in Utah. He argued that owning slaves was a way to improve the condition of the Africans because it would teach them how to live a useful life. He said that it would give them a platform to build off of and allow them to build as far as the Curse of Ham would allow them to progress. He argued that service was necessary, honorable, and important for all societies. However, he urged moderation by not treating Africans as beasts of the field or to elevate them to equality with the whites, which was against God's will.

He argued that slavery was a good balance in building on the foundation of how God wanted the African race to progress and observing the law of natural affection, which would lead whites to favor other whites. He said that was the principle of true liberty, according to the designs of God.

With those directions, the Utah legislature then drafted a bill entitled "An Act in Relation to African Slavery." All of the legislature was Mormon and regarded Young as a prophet.

On January 23, 1852, Young followed up with another speech to the Joint Session of the Legislature that advocated slavery. He first argued that the Legislature must support slavery on religious grounds and stated that "inasmuch as we believe in the ordinances of God, in the Priesthood and order and decrees of God, we must believe in slavery." He argued that the blacks had the Curse of Ham placed on them and so they were servants of servants and that he was not authorized to remove it. He argued that blacks needed to serve masters because they could not themselves and that when treated correctly, blacks were much better off as slaves than if they were free. He also suggested for the name of the act to be changed it to "An Act in Relation to Manual Service" to emphasize that slaves should be treated better. It was later changed to just "An Act in Relation to Service."

Many scholars have hypothesized on the reasons for Young's support of slavery. John Smith suggested that with New Mexico leaning toward entering the Union as a free state, Young may have felt it would be easier to enter the Union as a slave state to preserve the balance of power in Congress. Smith also pointed out that several Mormons owned slaves, partially because the Mormons had actively proselyted in the Southern United States prior to their arrival in Utah, including several prominent Mormons (including Apostles Charles C. Rich, and Abraham Smoot). Smith also thought that Young may have felt that white slaveowners from the South would be more likely to convert to Mormonism and to migrate to Utah if their slaves were treated as property.

== Passage ==
An Act in Relation to Service was passed on February 4, 1852. The act had a few special provisions unique to slavery in Utah. Masters were required by law to correct and punish their slaves, which particularly worried Republicans in Congress. Slaves brought into Utah had to come "of their own free will and choice" and could not be sold or taken from there against their will. Though a fixed period of servitude was not prescribed for Negroes, the law provided "that no contract shall bind the heirs of the servant... for a longer period than will satisfy the debt due his [master]." Several unique provisions were included, which terminated the owner's contract in the event that the master had sexual intercourse with a servant "of the African race;" neglected to feed, clothe, shelter; otherwise abused the servant; or attempted to take him from the territory against his will. Some schooling was also required for slaves between the ages of six and twenty.

Section 4 of the statute prohibited sexual relations or miscegenation between whites and blacks. It read in part that "if any white person shall be guilty of sexual intercourse with any of the African race, they shall be subject, on conviction thereof to a fine of not exceeding one thousand dollars, nor less than five hundred, to the use of the Territory, and imprisonment, not exceeding three years."

The day after the act passed, Young gave the explanation of the Curse of Cain for slavery. He also taught that blacks should have no part in the government, including the right to vote. (Blacks had been barred from voting.) He warned against interracial marriages and treating blacks as equals. He also declared after the passage of the statute, "I am as much opposed to the principle of slavery as any man in the present acceptation or usage of the term. It is abused. I am opposed to abusing that which God decreed, to take a blessing and make a curse of it. It is a great blessing to the seed of Adam to have the seed of Cain as servants, but those they serve should use them with all the heart and feeling, as they would use their own children and their compassion should reach over them and round about them, and treat them as kindly, and with that human feeling necessary to be shown to mortal beings of the human species. Under these circumstances their blessings in life are greater in portion than those that have to provide the bread and dinner for them."

== Act for the relief of Indian Slaves and Prisoners ==
When Young called for an act on slavery, he referenced both African and Indian slavery. After the name of the bill changed from "An Act in Relation to African Slavery," the bill lost all mention of race, except in the section on sexual conduct, and technically included Indian slavery. However, the following month, the legislature passed a similar law specific to Indian slavery, with increased educational requirements for Indian slaves over African slaves. The requirement for ownership was also considerably lower since Indian slaves having to be only in possession of a white person. Utah was unique in actively enslaving both Africans and Indians.

== Repeal ==
The slavery portion of the act was repealed on June 19, 1862, when Congress prohibited slavery in all US territories. The anti-miscegenation portion remained in effect until 1963.

== See also ==
- Anti-miscegenation laws in the United States
- Utah in the American Civil War
- Slave Trade Acts
- Blacks and Mormonism#Slavery
- History of slavery in Utah
- Mormonism and slavery
