= Territorial Slavery Act of 1862 =

American abolitionary legislation

- Long title: An Act to secure Freedom to all Persons within the Territories of the United States
- Nicknames: Territorial Slavery Act of 1862

Citations
- Statutes at Large: 12 Stat. 432, ch. 111, § 1

Legislative history
- Introduced in the House as H.R. 374 on March 24, 1862; Passed the House on May 12, 1862 (85-50); Passed the Senate on June 9, 1862 (28-10); Signed into law by President Abraham Lincoln on June 19, 1862

An Act to secure Freedom to all Persons within the Territories of the United States, 12 Stat. 432, ch. 111, §1, colloquially known as the Territorial Slavery Act of 1862, is a federal law passed by the United States Congress prohibiting slavery in all current and future territories of the United States. Congress passed the legislation on June 9, 1862, and President Abraham Lincoln signed it into law on June 19, 1862.

== Background ==
In 1784, Thomas Jefferson proposed that the Congress of the Confederation adopt the Land Ordinance of 1784. Section five would have prohibited slavery in all new U.S. states after 1800. A motion was made to remove section five. Seven states needed to vote to retain the section; only six did so. It wasn't until 78 years later that Congress achieved what Jefferson had failed to do.

The Wilmot Proviso of 1846 also proposed that slavery be barred in all territories acquired from Mexico. Abraham Lincoln had supported the legislation while a member of the House of Representatives from 1847 to 1849.

== Passage of the legislation ==
In May 1862, Isaac N. Arnold (R-IL) introduced a bill in the House to abolish slavery in all places under federal jurisdiction. Moderate Republicans and border state Unionists complained the legislation was too broad. In response, Owen Lovejoy (R-IL) introduced a substitute bill to abolish slavery only in territories of the United States. Abolishing slavery in the territories was an issue that had united the Republican Party since its inception, and was part of the party platform of 1860.

During debate over the bill, not a single member of the House or Senate made mention of the Supreme Court's decision in Dred Scott v. Sandford, 60 U.S. (19 How.) 393 (1857). The second part of that decision held that Congress had no power to abolish slavery in the territories. Members of Congress were absolutely convinced that it had the constitutional power to prohibit slavery in the territories.

Lovejoy's bill, H.R. 374, passed the House of Representatives on May 12, 1862, and the Senate on June 9. Every Republican in both chambers voted for the bill; every Democrat opposed it. Nearly all border state Unionists also voted against it.

President Abraham Lincoln signed the legislation into law on June 19, 1862.

The act reads:

That from and after the passage of this act there shall be neither slavery nor involuntary servitude in any of the Territories of the United States now existing, or what may at any time hereafter be formed or acquired by the United States, otherwise than in punishment of crimes whereof the party shall have been duly convicted.

Abolition was immediate.

== Importance ==
The act essentially extended section six of the Northwest Ordinance and part of the Wilmot Proviso to all U.S. territories. This repudiated the Supreme Court's decision in Dred Scott. In adopting the act, Congress essentially took the view that the Dred Scott ruling was restricted solely to Dred Scott and his family.

The act was part of a trend in Congress to adopt increasingly progressive anti-slavery legislation. It also showed that Congress was beginning to recognize that slavery was the key issue in the American Civil War.

Only a small number of slaves were affected. There were only three U.S. territories at the time. New Mexico had freed its slaves in December 1861. There were only 15 slaves in Nebraska and 29 in Utah.

The Territorial Slavery Act was, however, symbolically important. Since taking office, Abraham Lincoln had sent Congress a series of very moderate proposals to end slavery, all of which respected the right to own human beings as property and the right of states to make their own decisions about the legality of slavery. In his State of the Union message to Congress on December 3, 1861, Lincoln proposed sending "confiscated" slaves to some territory, much as the Whig Party had proposed sending freed slaves to Haiti or Liberia. Legal scholar Francis Newton Thorpe argued the act "cut the Gordian knot" of slavery.

For the first time, federal legislation made no reference to compensating slave-owners, nor any mention of sending freed slaves out of the country.

The legislation was widely approved of throughout the North.

== Bibliography ==
- Boles, John B. (1984). Black Southerners, 1619-1869. Lexington, Ky.: University Press of Kentucky. ISBN 9780813103037.
- Borchard, Gregory A. (2011). Abraham Lincoln and Horace Greeley. Carbondale, Ill.: Southern Illinois University Press. ISBN 9780809330454.
- Feldman, Noah (2022). The Broken Constitution: Lincoln, Slavery, and the Refounding of America. New York: Picador, Farrar, Straus and Giroux. ISBN 9781250858788.
- Fisher, Louis (2011). Defending Congress and the Constitution. Lawrence, Kan.: University Press of Kansas. ISBN 9780700617982.
- Foner, Eric (2012). The Fiery Trial: Abraham Lincoln and American Slavery. New York: W.W. Norton. ISBN 9780393340662.
- Keifer, Joseph Warren (1900). Slavery and Four Years of War: A Political History of Slavery in the United States. Volume 1: 1861—1863. New York: G.P. Putnam's Sons. OCLC 1011916232.
- Kent, Andrew; Mortenson, Julian Davis (2018). "Executive Power and National Security Power". In Orren, Karen; Compton, John W. (eds.). The Cambridge Companion to the United States Constitution. Cambridge, UK: Cambridge University Press. ISBN 9781107094666.
- Thorpe, Francis Newton (1901). The Constitutional History of the United States. Chicago: Callaghan & Company. OCLC 6128897.
