= Patriarchal blessing (Latter Day Saints) =

Blessing in the Latter Day Saint movement

In the Latter Day Saint movement, a patriarchal blessing or evangelist blessing is administered by the laying on of hands, with accompanying words of counsel, reassurance and lifelong guidance intended solely for those receiving the blessing. The words are spoken by an ordained patriarch (evangelist) of the church, but are believed to be inspired by the Holy Ghost. These blessings are given in both the Church of Jesus Christ of Latter-day Saints (LDS Church) and the Community of Christ. The patriarchal/evangelist blessings are modeled after the blessing given by Jacob to each of his sons prior to his death.

Other blessings of comfort, healing, and guidance may be received at any time throughout a person's life, but a patriarchal/evangelist blessing is unique in that it is considered to be an ordinance (LDS Church), respectively a sacrament (Community of Christ). Other differences concerning patriarchal/evangelist blessings in these churches, for example, concerning whom can receive the blessing and when, or the scope and content of the blessing, are described in the respective sections below.

== In early Mormonism ==
The first Latter Day Saint patriarchal blessings were performed by Joseph Smith Sr., the father of Joseph Smith, who ordained his father to the role of patriarch on December 18, 1833. Smith Sr. gave his son a blessing on December 9, 1834, prophesying that the younger Smith would establish Zion, subdue his enemies, enjoy his posterity to the latest generation, and "stand on the earth" to witness the Second Coming (after the resurrection, in preparation for Judgement Day). That same day, Joseph Smith Sr. gathered all of his children and their spouses together to give each of them patriarchal blessings. Before Joseph Sr. died on September 14, 1840, he ordained his eldest living son, Hyrum Smith, to succeed him as Patriarch to the Church. From that time forward, Hyrum gave patriarchal blessings until his own death on June 27, 1844.

== In the LDS Church ==
In the LDS Church, a patriarchal blessing is an ordinance which is given when an authorized patriarch (a man ordained to the priesthood office of patriarch) places his hands on the head of the recipient and pronounces said blessing. The recipient must have previously received a recommendation for the blessing from his or her bishop. This is dependent on an interview by which the bishop determines the applicant's worthiness and readiness. The purpose of a patriarchal blessing is (1) to identify the tribe of Israel to which the individual belongs, whether literal or "adopted", along with the responsibilities and blessings associated; (2) to bless the member with knowledge and the spiritual gifts that may be obtained by obedience to gospel principles; (3) to give advice or help to the individual (often this includes foretelling of possible future events, opportunities, and temptations). Within the church, a patriarchal blessing is considered to be a revelation for the recipient, with the promises made in the blessing considered conditional upon the recipient's obedience to gospel principles.

A person is informed of the tribe of Israel to which they belong. This is done to acknowledge the fulfillment of the church doctrine that through baptism, members become part of the House of Israel. Additionally, it is believed that each tribe differs and a person may come to understand the unique circumstances of his or her life better by knowing to which tribe they belong. The differences between the tribes are generally acknowledged to arise from the differences in the blessings Jacob pronounced upon his sons and Joseph's sons, Ephraim and Manasseh.

A patriarchal blessing is usually pronounced upon a member only once. In rare circumstances, a person may receive permission to receive an additional patriarchal blessing. The blessing is usually performed in the home of the patriarch or of the seeker. In general, only close family members, such as parents or the person's spouse, are present. The patriarch places his hands on the seated person's head and speaks the blessing aloud. A record of the blessing is made at the same time, typically by the wife of the patriarch. Transcribed copies of all blessings are stored in church records and are considered by the church to be revelation.

Members receive a copy of the blessing, and are advised to consult it throughout their lives. Since adherents believe the blessings are direct revelation from God, the church advises members to treat them as sacred, not to be shared casually with others. Members may also request copies of the patriarchal blessings of their direct ancestors.

Any member found worthy and spiritually mature by their priesthood leader may receive a patriarchal blessing. Individuals who have been members from childhood generally ask to receive their patriarchal blessing as adolescents.

According to former church president Ezra Taft Benson, "A patriarchal blessing is the inspired and prophetic statement of your life's mission together with blessings, cautions, and admonitions as the patriarch may be prompted to give." Blessings given in the 19th century often made use of themes, such as millennialism and polygamy, that are not common in today's blessings. During his presidency, Joseph Fielding Smith advised patriarchs to be conservative in their blessings unless "especially inspired otherwise".

Although they are not generally ordained patriarchs, every Latter-day Saint father who holds the Melchizedek Priesthood can pronounce blessings upon his child or spouse, as necessary. Such blessings do not reveal the Tribe of Israel to which a person belongs. The church encourages families to create their own records of such blessings, but does not accept them into the official church archives in Salt Lake City as they would a blessing from an ordained patriarch.

Those who have received a patriarchal blessing are told to read it "humbly, prayerfully, and frequently." By following the counsel in a patriarchal blessing, they can better understand and receive the blessings contained therein.

According to historian D. Michael Quinn, patriarchs were paid in the early days of the LDS Church. The practice of paying patriarchs diminished in the 20th century and was officially ended in 1943. "'Both the Presiding Patriarch and local stake patriarchs charged a fee. In the 1840s the fee was $1 per patriarchal blessing at Nauvoo; by the end of the nineteenth century it had increased to $2 per blessing. Joseph Smith Sr. gave patriarchal blessings without payment of a fee, but would not record them. 'Uncle' John Smith commented that he "lived very poor ever since we left Kirtland Ohio" (from January 1838 until January 1844). Then his nephew, Joseph Smith, ordained him a patriarch 'through which office I obtained a comfortable living.' "....Patriarchal blessing fees ended in 1902, although patriarchs were allowed to accept unsolicited donations. Not until 1943 did church authorities prohibit patriarchs from accepting gratuities for giving blessings."

=== Lineage ===
As with the pre-1844 church led by Joseph Smith, an important part of patriarchal blessing in the LDS Church is the declaration of lineage. Members receiving the blessing are told to which of the twelve Israelite tribes they belong. Opinions differ as to whether the lineage is intended to mean literal ancestry, or whether the lineage is metaphorical or adoptive, as there are many recorded instances of children having a different lineage from their parents. Daniel H. Ludlow has said "in a patriarchal blessing, lineage is being declared ... when terms indicating direct descent are used, such as 'son of,' 'daughter of,' 'seed of,' 'blood of,' 'descendant of,' or 'from the loins of.'" The church also teaches that "[b]ecause each of us has many bloodlines running in us, two members of the same family may be declared as being of different tribes in Israel". In the early 19th and 20th centuries, members were more likely to believe they were literally descended from a certain tribe.

In 1961, the Church Historian's Office reported that other lineages had been given, including from Cain to some Black members. In 1971, the Presiding Patriarch stated that non-Israelite tribes should not be given as a lineage in a patriarchal blessing. In a 1980 address to students at Brigham Young University, James E. Faust attempted to assure listeners that if they had no declared lineage in their patriarchal blessing, that the Holy Ghost would "purge out the old blood, and make him actually of the seed of Abraham." The overwhelming majority of blessings declare the recipient to be a member of the tribe of Ephraim or Manasseh. Ephraim is the dominant tribe declared for people of European descent and Manasseh dominates for Pacific Islanders and South Americans. Jews have typically been assigned to the tribe of Judah.

=== Black people and patriarchal blessings ===
In Elijah Abel's 1836 patriarchal blessing, no lineage was declared, but he was promised in the afterlife he would be equal to his fellow members. Jane Manning James's blessing in 1844 gave the lineage of Ham. After the priesthood ban, Black people were still allowed patriarchal blessings but were denied declaration of lineage out of policy. However, the guidelines were inconsistent. In Brazil, this was interpreted to mean that if a patriarch pronounced a lineage, then the member was not a descendant of Cain and was therefore eligible for the priesthood, despite physical or genealogical evidence of Black African ancestry. In 1934, patriarch James H. Wallis wrote in his journal that he had always known that Black people could not receive a patriarchal blessing because of the temple and priesthood ban, but that they could, however, receive one without a lineage.

After the 1978 revelation, patriarchs sometimes declared lineage in patriarchal blessings for Black members, but sometimes they did not declare a lineage. Some Black members have asked for and received new patriarchal blessings including a lineage.

== In the Community of Christ ==
In the Community of Christ, the evangelist blessing is one of the eight sacraments of the church, along with baptism, confirmation, communion (the Lord’s Supper), ordination, the blessing of children, the laying on of hands for the sick, and marriage. The term patriarchal blessing was renamed "evangelist blessing" (sometimes called evangelist's blessing) in 1985, to reflect the change in terminology from patriarch to the gender-neutral "Evangelist" when women were first ordained to offices of the priesthood. An evangelist blessing may be said for individuals, couples, families, households, groups, and congregations. Time is spent in preparation through prayer, spiritual practices, study, and discernment. An evangelist or team of evangelists will guide the preparation. Once adequate preparation is completed, the evangelist(s) offers a prayer. The sacrament of evangelist blessing is available to people of all beliefs and faith traditions who understand its purpose and desire to receive it. Traditionally, children of eight years of age or older can receive a blessing, although the blessing is rarely offered for someone who has not reached adolescence.

A blessing need not be a once-in-a-lifetime experience, and may be received at various points of need or times of transition. For an individual, this could involve for example serious illness, career change, retirement etc. Although tribal lineage was revealed in earlier years, that practice is no longer common.

== Criticisms ==
Some former Mormons and LDS Church critics have said that patriarchal blessings are similar to fortune telling, and that like fortune telling the practice unfairly gives members false information that members will often later use to make major life decisions. According to an article from Mormonism Research Ministry, the blessings' fulfillment are often conditioned on members' faithfulness to the church, helping keep members obedient to church leaders and blaming themselves rather than the patriarch when the promises are not fulfilled.

== See also ==
- Tribe of Ephraim
- House of Joseph
- Tribe of Joseph
- Gathering of Israel
- The Lost Tribes
