= Murder of Thomas Coleman =

1866 racist hate crime lynching in Utah

Thomas Coleman
- Born: Circa 1832; Mississippi
- Died: December 10, 1866 (aged 33–34); Salt Lake City, Utah
- Cause of death: Lynching, head bludgeoned with a large rock, throat cut with a knife
- Body discovered: 11 Dec 1866, 40.7759°N 111.8911°W
- Burial place: Salt Lake City Cemetery; 200 "N" Street: 40.776918°N 111.859853°W
- Other names: "Nigger Tom", Thomas Colburn, Thomas Bankhead
- Occupation: Hotel attendant
- Employer: Brigham Young
- Organization: The Salt Lake House

Thomas Coleman (c. 1832 – December 10, 1866), a Black man formerly enslaved by Mormons, was murdered in 1866 in Salt Lake City, Utah. Sources report the lynching was a hate crime and was committed by a friend or family member (or multiple people) of a White woman Coleman allegedly had been seen walking with before. The killer(s) slit his throat deeply and castrated his body. They then dumped his body near where the Utah State Capitol is now located, and pinned a note to his chest which said in large letters, "Notice to all niggers! Take warning!! Leave white women alone!!!"

== Background ==
At the time, Salt Lake City's population was overwhelmingly White and 90% Mormon, and church members were strongly influenced by church leaders' anti-interracial-marriage teachings in the Church of Jesus Christ of Latter-day Saints (LDS Church). For example, church president and former governor of the Utah Territory, Brigham Young taught on at least three occasions (1847, 1852, and 1865) that the punishment for Black–White interracial marriages was death. He gave the example of beheading as a fitting method in one instance. Young further stated the killing of a Black–White interracial couple and their children as part of a blood atonement would be a blessing to them. Additionally, Utah's predominantly LDS government had outlawed Black-White marriages in 1852. Nationwide, the ethnic stereotype caricaturing Black men as brutes who often raped White women was used as a justification for lynching.

== See also ==
- Lynching of Robert Marshall
- Lynching of William Harvey
- Black people and Mormonism
- William McCary
- Mormon teachings on skin color
