= Black people and temple and priesthood policies (LDS Church) =

From 1852 to 1978, temple and priesthood policies in the Church of Jesus Christ of Latter-day Saints (LDS Church) prohibited both black women and men from temple ordinances and ordination in the all-male priesthood. In 1978, the church's highest governing body, the First Presidency, declared in the "Official Declaration 2" statement, that the restriction had been lifted. Between 1830 and 1852, a few black men had been ordained to the Mormon priesthood in the Latter Day Saint movement under Joseph Smith.

As part of this restriction, both black men and women of African descent at various times, were prohibited from taking part in ceremonies in the church's temples (e.g. endowments and marriage sealings), serving in certain leadership callings, attending priesthood meetings, and speaking at firesides. Spouses of black people of African descent were also prohibited from entering the temple. Over time, the restriction was relaxed so that dark-skinned people of non-African descent could attend priesthood meetings and people with a "questionable lineage" were given the priesthood, such as Fijians, Indigenous Australians, and Egyptians, as well as Brazilians and South Africans with an unknown heritage who did not appear to have any black heritage.

During this time, leaders in Mormonism's largest denomination—the LDS Church—taught that the restriction came from curses of Cain and Ham and their descendants, and that black people were less valiant in their premortal life. Top church leaders (called general authorities) used LDS scriptures to justify their explanations, including the Book of Moses, which teaches that the descendants of Canaan had "a blackness come upon them", and the Book of Abraham which says a Pharaoh could not have the priesthood because of his lineage. In 1978, the church president and apostles declared that the restrictions were lifted as a result of a revelation. The 1978 declaration was incorporated into the Doctrine and Covenants, a book of LDS scripture.

In December 2013, the LDS Church published an essay approved by the First Presidency which discussed the restriction. In it, the church disavowed most race-based explanations for the past priesthood restriction and denounced racism. A 2016 survey of self-identified LDS adherents revealed that over 60 percent of respondents either "know" or "believe" that the priesthood/temple ban was God's will. A 2023 survey of over 1,000 former church members in the Mormon corridor found race issues in the church to be one of the top three reported reasons why they had disaffiliated.

== Racial restrictions ==
Under the racial restrictions that lasted from the presidency of Brigham Young until 1978, people with any black African ancestry could not hold the priesthood in the LDS Church and could not participate in most temple ordinances, including the endowment and celestial marriage. Black people were permitted to be members of the church, and to participate in some temple ordinances, such as baptism for the dead.

The racial restrictions were applied to black Africans, persons of black African descent, and anyone with mixed race that included any black African ancestry. The restrictions were not applied to Native Americans, Hispanics, Melanesians, or Polynesians.

=== Priesthood ===
Brigham Young taught that black men would not receive the priesthood until "all the other descendants of Adam have received the promises and enjoyed the blessings of the Priesthood and the keys thereof."

The priesthood restriction was particularly limiting, because the LDS Church has a lay priesthood and all worthy male members may receive the priesthood if they choose to do so. Young men are generally admitted to the Aaronic priesthood at age 12, and it is a significant rite of passage. Holders of the priesthood officiate at church meetings, perform blessings of healing, and manage church affairs. Excluding black people from the priesthood meant that they could not hold significant church leadership roles or participate in certain spiritual events such as blessing the sick or giving other blessings reserved for priesthood holders.

=== Temple ordinances ===
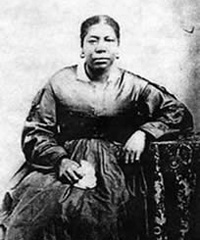
Jane Manning was an early church member and servant in Smith's household in Nauvoo, and followed Young to the Utah Territory. She petitioned church leadership for the temple endowment, but was repeatedly denied because she was black.

Between 1852 and 1978, most black people were not permitted to participate in ordinances performed in the LDS Church temples, such as the endowment, celestial marriages, and family sealings. Despite this, Joseph Fielding Smith clarified in 1958 "...if a Negro is baptized and remains true and loyal, he will enter the celestial kingdom... but we cannot promise him that he will receive the priesthood".

LDS leaders teach that those marriages sealed in the church's temples can become celestial marriages that bind the family together forever, whereas those marriages that are not sealed are terminated upon death. As church president, David O. McKay taught that black people "need not worry, as those who receive the testimony of the restored gospel may have their family ties protected and other blessings made secure, for in the justice of the Lord they will possess all the blessings to which they are entitled in the eternal plan of Salvation and Exaltation." This is in line with what was revealed to Joseph Smith Jr. in 1836.

Brigham Young taught, "When the ordinances are carried out in the temples that will be erected, [children] will be sealed to their [parents], and those who have slept, clear up to Father Adam. This will have to be done ... until we shall form a perfect chain from Father Adam down to the closing up scene."

An exception to the temple ban for black members was that (except for the complete temple ban period from the mid-1960s until the early 1970s under McKay), black members had been allowed a limited use recommend to act as proxies in baptisms for the dead. Additionally, black children who were legally adopted by white parents could be sealed to their parents.

=== Church service ===
Under the priesthood ban, black men and women could not hold any significant church callings, be leaders, or serve missions. The LDS Church relies heavily on its unpaid members to fulfill leadership positions and serve in church callings. For men, the priesthood is required for many leadership and church callings and is given to virtually every male as early as age 11. For both men and women, a temple endowment is required or encouraged for other callings, such as missionary service. This limited the ability of black members to serve in various callings. When the priesthood was given to black people under Joseph Smith, they were also able to serve in a variety of callings. For example, Elijah Abel served a mission and was called to hold the priesthood office of seventy. When Brigham Young instituted the priesthood restriction, black members were barred from many leadership and service positions, and, initially, from attending priesthood meetings. In 1952, McKay banned black people from speaking at priesthood meetings and firesides.

Through the years, some exceptions were made to allow black members to serve without the priesthood. For example, Samuel Chamber was appointed to be an assistant deacon in 1873. He had the same duties as a deacon, but without being given the priesthood. In 1945, Abner and Martha Howell were called to serve a mission to establish segregated congregations in the southern states. Howell was given a letter signed by LeGrand Richards that allowed him to speak even though black people were not permitted to attend services there. He was later given a card designating him as an "Honorary High Priest".

By the 1960s, black men could serve in leadership roles in auxiliary organizations and attend priesthood meetings, including serving in the Sunday School or Young Men presidency. In the 1960s, church president McKay began considering opening up a mission in Nigeria. After several difficulties with visas, LeMar Williams was in Nigeria preparing to open the mission. It was decided that only the auxiliaries would be set up in Nigeria, which could be operated without the priesthood. Nigerian men would be allowed to pass the sacrament, but white missionaries would need to bless it. However, the program was canceled after several members of the Quorum of the Twelve Apostles objected. In 1971, the Genesis Group was formed as an auxiliary to the church for black members. Black members were able to fill positions in the Relief Society, Young Men, and Young Women presidencies. Mary Bankhead served as the first Relief Society president.

Since the 1978 rescinding of racial restrictions, black people have been able to serve in church callings and fulfill leadership positions. However, service at general church levels has been limited. While there have been several black members of the Quorums of the Seventy and auxiliary general boards, until 2020 there had not been a member of the First Presidency, Quorum of the Twelve Apostles, or the general organizational presidencies (Relief Society, Young Women, Primary, Young Men, or Sunday School) that was black. On April 4, 2020, Ahmad Corbitt was sustained as First Counselor in the Young Men General Presidency, and is the first black person to hold that position.

=== People who married black people ===
The first time a church leader taught that a non-black person was cursed for having married a black person was on February 6, 1835. An assistant president of the church, W. W. Phelps, wrote a letter theorizing that Ham's wife was a descendant of Cain and that Ham himself was cursed for "marrying a black wife". Young expanded this idea, teaching that non-black people who had children with a black person would themselves be cursed to the priesthood, and that the law of the Lord required the couple and their children to be killed. George Q. Cannon of the First Presidency reaffirmed this was the law of the Lord and explained it was to keep the descendants of Cain from getting the priesthood.

Several white members were denied access to temple ceremonies after they had married a black person. One white woman was denied a temple sealing to her white husband because she had previously married a black man, even though she had divorced him. Cannon argued that allowing her access to the temple would not be fair to her two daughters, which she had with her black husband. Another white man was denied the priesthood because he had married a black woman. In 1966, a white woman who had received her endowments was banned by local leaders from going to the temple and was told her endowments were invalid because she had since married a black man. Church president McKay agreed with the ban on going to the temple, but said her endowments were still valid. After 1978, husbands of black women could receive the priesthood and spouses of black people could perform temple rituals.

=== Implementation ===
Several black men received the priesthood before the racial restrictions were put in place, including Elijah Abel's son Enoch Abel, who was ordained an elder on November 10, 1900. Enoch's son and Elijah Abel's grandson—who was also named Elijah Abel—received the Aaronic priesthood and was ordained to the office of priest on July 5, 1934. The younger Elijah Abel also received the Melchizedek priesthood and was ordained to the office of elder on September 29, 1935. One commentator has pointed out that these incidents illustrate the "ambiguities, contradictions, and paradoxes" of the issue during the twentieth century.

As the church began expanding in areas of the world that were not so racially segregated, the church began having problems distinguishing who had black ancestry. In Brazil, which had a high proportion of people with mixed ancestry, LDS officials advised missionaries in the 1920s to avoid teaching people who appeared to have black ancestry, advising them to look for relatives of the investigators if they were not sure about their racial heritage. Despite the precautions, by the 1940s and 1950s some people with African ancestry had unwittingly been given the priesthood, which prompted an emphasis on missionaries scrutinizing people's appearances for hints of black ancestry and an order to avoid teaching those who did not meet the "one-drop rule" criteria. Additionally, starting in the 1970s "lineage lessons" were added to determine that interested persons did not have any Sub-Saharan African ancestry. Occasionally, members discovered they had African ancestry after being given the priesthood. In some cases, priesthood authority over-ruled genealogy research. For example, the First Presidency reinstated the president of the Ipiranga, Brazil branch, stating he was not of the lineage of Cain, despite genealogy research showing black ancestry. In other cases, members with black ancestry received patriarchal blessings giving lineage through one of the tribes of Israel, which allowed priesthood ordination.

In South Africa, some mission presidents had not observed the ban, and ordained members with mixed blood. The First Presidency called Evan Wright and instructed him that no one could receive the priesthood unless they were able to trace their genealogy outside of Africa, even if they had no appearance of African descent. Wright called several missionaries full-time to assist in the genealogy work, but the lack of men who could fulfill the requirement proved difficult. In 1954, David O. McKay made a change to allow men to be ordained who did not appear to have black heritage.

During his time as church president in the 1950s, McKay made some decisions allowing peoples of "questionable lineage" to receive the priesthood when they previously would not have been allowed. This was one of the first decisions made to broaden access to the priesthood and relax certain aspects of the restrictions imposed because of the priesthood policies of the time. For example, Fijians were not given the priesthood until 1955 when McKay visited Fiji and told the president of the Samoa Mission that proselyting efforts with the Fijians could begin. Four years later, McKay informed his counselors that there was no evidence that the peoples of Fiji were of African descent.

In 1964, the priesthood was extended to Indigenous Australians and in 1966 to Egyptians.

== Stated justifications for the priesthood ban ==
Church leadership officially cited various reasons for the doctrinal ban, but later leaders have since repudiated them.

=== The curse of Cain and his descendants ===
Some church members, including certain LDS leaders, used the curse of Cain to justify the racial restrictions. In the book of Genesis found in the Bible, God puts a mark on Cain after he kills his brother Abel. Brigham Young taught that Cain killed Abel to get advantage over him, so God cursed Cain's descendants to not receive the priesthood until all the rest of Adam's descendants received the priesthood. During Young's presidency this was the explanation and was consistently taught by all leaders. It was only after Brigham Young died that the Church began teaching that the reason for the ban was unknown.

While serving in the First Council of the Seventy, Bruce R. McConkie wrote in his 1966 edition of Mormon Doctrine that those who were sent to Earth through the lineage of Cain were those who had been less valiant in the premortal life. He also said that because Ham married Egyptus and because she was a descendant of Cain, that he was able to preserve the "negro lineage." The denial of the priesthood to certain men was then mentioned and he explained that in this life, black people would not hold the priesthood, but that those blessings would be available to them in the next life. (Note: Bruce R. McConkie said, "Of the two-thirds who followed Christ, however, some were more valiant than others ....Those who were less valiant in pre-existence and who thereby had certain spiritual restrictions imposed upon them during mortality are known to us as the negroes. Such spirits are sent to earth through the lineage of Cain, the mark put upon him for his rebellion against God and his murder of Abel being a Black skin (Moses 5:16–41; 12:22). Noah's son Ham married Egyptus, a descendant of Cain, thus preserving the negro lineage through the flood (Abraham 1:20–27). Negroes in this life are denied the priesthood; under no circumstances can they hold this delegation of authority from the Almighty. (Abra. 1:20–27.) The gospel message of salvation is not carried affirmatively to them (Moses 7:8, 12, 22), although sometimes negroes search out the truth, join the Church, and become by righteous living heirs of the celestial kingdom of heaven. President Brigham Young and others have taught that in the future eternity worthy and qualified negroes will receive the priesthood and every gospel blessing available to any man. The present status of the negro rests purely and simply on the foundation of pre-existence. Along with all races and peoples he is receiving here what he merits as a result of the long pre-mortal probation in the presence of the Lord....The negroes are not equal with other races where the receipt of certain spiritual blessings are concerned, particularly the priesthood and the temple blessings that flow therefrom, but this inequality is not of man's origin. It is the Lord's doing.") In 1881, church president John Taylor expounded on the belief that the curse placed on Ham (who was of the lineage of Cain), was continued because Ham's wife was also of that "seed." (Note: John Taylor said, "And after the flood we are told that the curse that had been pronounced upon Cain was continued through Ham's wife, as he had married a wife of that seed. And why did it pass through the flood? Because it was necessary that the devil should have a representation upon the earth as well as God; and that man should be a free agent to act for himself, and that all men might have the opportunity of receiving or rejecting the truth, and be governed by it or not according to their wishes and abide the result; and that those who would be able to maintain correct principles under all circumstances, might be able to associate with the Gods in the eternal worlds.") While later serving as an apostle, McConkie said in 1978 that the curse of Cain was no longer in effect.

=== Curse of Ham and Book of Abraham ===
According to the Bible, Ham discovered his father Noah drunk and naked in his tent. Because of this, Noah cursed Ham's son, Canaan, to be "servants of servants". Although the scriptures do not mention anything about skin color, many Americans during the 19th century believed that Ham had married a descendant of Cain, who was black, and that black people carried the curse of Ham. W. W. Phelps, a counselor in the presidency of the church, taught that Ham had married a black wife.

The Book of Abraham, considered scripture in the LDS movement, denotes that an Egyptian king by the name of Pharaoh was a descendant of Ham and the Canaanites, who were black, (Moses 7:8) that Noah had cursed his lineage so they did not have the right to the priesthood, and that all Egyptians descended from him. It was later considered scripture by the LDS Church. This passage is the only one found in any Mormon scripture that bars a particular lineage of people from holding the priesthood. While both Joseph Smith and Brigham Young referred to the curse of Ham as a justification for the enslavement of black people, neither used the curse of Ham or the Book of Abraham to justify the priesthood ban. It was not until 1900 that George Q. Cannon, a member of the First Presidency, began using the story of Pharaoh as a scriptural basis for the ban. In 1912, the First Presidency responded to an inquiry about the priesthood ban by using the story of Pharaoh. By the early 1900s, it became the foundation of church reasoning for the priesthood ban.

In a 1908 Liahona article for missionaries, an anonymous but church-sanctioned author reviewed the scriptures about blackness in the Pearl of Great Price. The author postulated that Ham married a descendant of Cain. Therefore, Canaan received two curses, one from Noah, and one from being a descendant of Cain. The article states that Canaan was the "sole ancestor of the Negro race" and explicitly linked his curse to be "servant of servants" to black priesthood denial. To support this idea, the article also discussed how Pharaoh, a descendant of Canaan according to LDS scripture, could not have the priesthood, because Noah "cursed him as pertaining to the Priesthood".

In 1978, when the church ended the ban on the priesthood, Bruce R. McConkie taught that the seed of Ham, Canaan, Egyptus and Pharaoh were no longer under the ancient curse. The 2002 Doctrine and Covenants Student Manual points to Abraham 1:21-27 as the reasoning behind the not giving black people the priesthood until 1978.

Author David Persuitte has pointed out that it was commonplace in the 19th century for theologians, including Joseph Smith, to believe that the curse of Cain was exhibited by black skin, and that this genetic trait had descended through Noah's son Ham, who was understood to have married a black wife. Mormon historian Claudia Bushman also identifies doctrinal explanations for the exclusion of black people, with one justification originating in papyrus rolls translated by Joseph Smith as the Book of Abraham, a passage of which links ancient Egyptian government to the cursed Ham through Pharaoh, Ham's grandson, who was "of that lineage by which he could not have the right of priesthood".

=== Consequence of premortal existence ===
Another reason for racial restriction advanced by church leadership was called "Mormon karma" by historian Colin Kidd, and refers to the idea that skin color is perceived as evidence of righteousness (or lack thereof) in the premortal existence. The doctrine of premortal existence is described in the Encyclopedia of Mormonism as "characterized by individuality, agency, intelligence, and opportunity for eternal progression. It is a central doctrine of the theology of the Church and provides understanding to the age-old question 'Whence cometh man?'" This idea is based on the opinions of several prominent church leaders, including long-time apostle and later church president Joseph Fielding Smith, who held the view that the premortal life had been a kind of testing ground for the assignment of God's spiritual children to favored or disfavored mortal lineages. Bushman has also noted Smith's long-time teachings that in a premortal war in heaven, black people were considered to have been those spirits who did not fight as valiantly against Satan and who, as a result, received a lesser earthly stature, with such restrictions as being disqualified from holding the priesthood. In the early 1930s, George F. Richards noted that there was no official position, but argued that God would not have assigned some of his children to be black if they had not done something wrong in the pre-existence. According to religious historian Craig Prentiss, the appeal to premortal existence was confirmed as doctrine through statements of the LDS First Presidency in 1949 and 1969.

=== Unknown reasons ===
In 1969, the First Presidency said black people did not have the priesthood "for reasons which we believe are known to God". When the ban was lifted in 1978, there was no official explanation for the racist language in Mormon scripture or whether the curse had been removed or had never existed. However, some church leaders made some statements. McConkie said that curse had been lifted and the previous statements made by himself and other church leaders on the subject were to be forgotten and that the focus of the gospel should be on current teachings. Church president Gordon B. Hinckley said the ban was not wrong, but there was a reason for it and that the statement given in 1978 during its removal speaks for itself. Apostle Dallin H. Oaks said it was not the pattern of the Lord to give reasons.

In 2003, black LDS Church member Darron Smith wrote in Sunstone that many members held onto previous explanations about the ban because church leadership had not addressed the ban's origins.

=== Protection from Hell ===
Brigham Young University Religious Studies professor, Randy L. Bott, suggested that God denied the priesthood to black men in order to protect them from the lowest rung of hell, since one of few damnable sins is to abuse the exercise of the priesthood. Bott compared the priesthood ban to a parent denying young children the keys to the family car, stating: "You couldn't fall off the top of the ladder, because you weren't on the top of the ladder. So, in reality black men not having the priesthood was the greatest blessing God could give them." In 2012 the official LDS Newsroom responded to Randy Bott's controversial statements sharing, "The positions attributed to BYU professor Randy Bott in a recent Washington Post article absolutely do not represent the teachings and doctrines of [the church]".

=== Human error ===
Referring to the priesthood ban, apostle Spencer W. Kimball said in 1963, "The doctrine or policy has not varied in my memory. I know it could. I know the Lord could change his policy and release the ban and forgive the possible error which brought about the deprivation."

In 2013, the LDS Church put out an essay discussing the racist environment in which the ban was formed and said that it is likely the ban was based more on racism than God's will.

== Teachings about the priesthood ban ==
=== Divinity of ban, Doctrine vs. Policy ===
Church leaders taught for decades that the priesthood ordination and temple ordinance ban was commanded by God. Brigham Young taught it was a "true eternal principle the Lord Almighty has ordained." In 1949, the First Presidency (under George Albert Smith) officially stated that it was "not a matter of the declaration of a policy but of direct commandment from the Lord". A second First Presidency statement (this time under McKay) in 1969 reemphasized that this "seeming discrimination by the Church towards the Negro is not something which originated with man; but goes back into the beginning with God". As president of the church, Kimball also emphasized in a 1973 press conference that the ban was "not my policy or the Church's policy. It is the policy of the Lord who has established it." On the topic of doctrine and policy for the race ban lifting the apostle Dallin H. Oaks stated in 1988, "I don't know that it's possible to distinguish between policy and doctrine in a church that believes in continuing revelation and sustains its leader as a prophet. ... I'm not sure I could justify the difference in doctrine and policy in the fact that before 1978 a person could not hold the priesthood and after 1978 they could hold the priesthood."

When it was announced in the 1978 that the ban was reversed, Kimball wrote a letter saying that the Lord revealed "that the long-promised day has come". This was later canonized in LDS scripture as Official Declaration 2. McConkie said that the voice of God had said "that the time had now come", and that the entire First Presidency and Quorum of the Twelve heard the same voice, and knew that the ancient curse had been lifted. In 1995, black church member A. David Jackson asked church leaders to issue a declaration repudiating that the ban was a direct commandment from the Lord. At first, the church refused.

In 2012, the church changed the preface to Official Declaration 2 to include these sentences regarding the priesthood ban: "Church records offer no clear insights into the origins of this practice. Church leaders believed that a revelation from God was needed to alter this practice". However, it did not specifically say what parts of the ban came from God and which did not. In 2013, the church published an essay which said that the ban had its roots more in racism than the will of God. A 2016 landmark survey of 1,156 self-identified Latter-day Saints found that almost two-thirds of surveyed members reported believing the pre-1978 temple and priesthood ban was "God's will".

=== Duration of ban ===
Brigham Young taught that black men would not receive the priesthood until "all the other descendants of Adam have received the promises and enjoyed the blessings of the priesthood and the keys thereof." But that meant that those who had been denied the priesthood would one day receive the priesthood and its related blessings. At another time, he stated "that the time [would] come when they [would] have the privilege of all we have the privilege of and more." Young added that after death once all other children of God had received the priesthood that the curse of Cain would be lifted and black people would "have [all] the privilege and more" that was enjoyed by other members of the church.

In 1963, while discussing when the ban would be lifted, Joseph Fielding Smith told a reporter that "such a change can come about only through divine revelation, and no one can predict when a divine revelation will occur."

Mormon apologetics author and lecturer John Lewis Lund wrote in 1967, "Brigham Young revealed that the negro will not receive the priesthood until a great while after the second advent of Jesus Christ, whose coming will usher in a millennium of peace."

When the restrictions were reversed in 1978, church president Kimball referred to it as "the long-promised day". Critics say that lifting the restriction before the resurrection is contrary to Young's 1854 and 1859 statements, while church apologists say that Brigham Young's statements meant that Africans could receive the priesthood after all other races were eligible to receive it, not all other individuals.

=== Start of the ban ===
Some scholars have suggested that the actions of William McCary, a half-black man who called himself a prophet and the successor to Joseph Smith, led to Young's decision to ban black men from receiving the priesthood. Young taught in 1855 that black people's position as "servant of servants" was a law under heaven and that it was not the church's place to change God's law. Under the racial restrictions that lasted from Young's presidency until 1978, persons with any black African ancestry could not receive church priesthood or any temple ordinances including the endowment and eternal marriage or participate in any proxy ordinances for the dead. An important exception to this temple ban was that (except for a complete temple ban period from the mid-1960s until the early 1970s under McKay) black members had been allowed limited temple access to act as proxies in baptisms for the dead. The priesthood restriction was particularly limiting, because the LDS Church has a lay priesthood, and most male members over the age of 12 received the priesthood. Holders of the priesthood officiate at church meetings, perform blessings of healing, and manage church affairs. By excluding black men from the priesthood it meant that they could not hold any significant church leadership roles or participate in important rites such as performing a baptism, blessing the sick, or giving a baby blessing. Between 1844 and 1977, most black people were not permitted to participate in ordinances performed in the LDS Church temples, such as the endowment ritual, celestial marriages, and family sealings. As black people were banned from having a temple marriage prior to 1978, some leaders interpreted this to mean they would be treated like unmarried white people after death, being limited to living forever as just ministering servants. Apostles George F. Richards and Mark E. Petersen taught that black people could not achieve exaltation because of the priesthood and temple restrictions. Several leaders, including Joseph Smith, Brigham Young, Wilford Woodruff, George Albert Smith, David O. McKay, Joseph Fielding Smith, and Harold B. Lee taught that black people would eventually be able to receive salvation, without explicitly stating this salvation would include the high status of exaltation.

Under John Taylor's presidency (1880–1887), there was confusion in the church regarding the origin of the racial restrictions. Zebedee Coltrin and Abraham O. Smoot provided conflicting testimony of whether or not Joseph Smith stated that Elijah Abel was allowed to hold the priesthood, though the veracity of their testimony is doubted. Coltrin, who ordained Abel, stated that in 1834 Smith had told him, "the Spirit of the Lord saith the Negro had no right nor cannot hold the Priesthood," and that Abel should be dropped from the Seventies because of his lineage. In 1908 church president Joseph F. Smith (a nephew of the church founder) said that Abel's ordination had been declared null and void by his uncle personally. Prior to this statement, he had denied any connection between the temple and priesthood ban and Joseph Smith. From this point on, many statements on the priesthood restriction were attributed to Joseph Smith; all such statements had actually been made by Brigham Young. The church taught that the ban originated with Joseph Smith, with the First Presidency declaring it so in 1947.

In 2013, the church issued a statement saying the ban seemed to have started with Brigham Young instead of Joseph Smith.

== History during racial restrictions ==
=== Before 1847 ===
During the time Joseph Smith, founder of the Latter Day Saint movement (1830–1844), was the leader, there were no official racial policies established in the Church of Christ. Black people were welcomed as members of the church and as evidence of the lack of official policy, in 1836, two black men were ordained priests: Elijah Abel and Walker Lewis. Before 1847 a handful of other black men were ordained to the priesthood. That same year, Abel went on to become a member of the Quorum of the Seventy and received a patriarchal blessing. Although there was no official policy, there is evidence that some black men were denied the priesthood during the Missouri period in order to appease enslavers in the area.

Some researchers have suggested that the actions of Joseph T. Ball and William McCary led to Young's decision to adopt the priesthood ban in the LDS Church.

==== Joseph T. Ball ====
A native of Massachusetts, Joseph T. Ball was good friends with William Smith (Joseph Smith's younger brother). Because of his close connection to Smith, he began to engage in polygamy without the approval of Brigham Young. Although he continued to be involved in the practice of polygamy, he served as the branch president in Boston for a time, making him the first black person to preside over an LDS congregation. In August 1845, Ball was separated from the church because Young found out about his previous involvement with polygamy.

==== William McCary ====
Because of events that transpired in both Cincinnati, Ohio, and Winter Quarters, Nebraska, McCary lost the favor of Young. McCary was a half-African American convert who, after his baptism and ordination to the priesthood, began to claim to be a prophet and the possessor of other supernatural gifts. At one point, he also claimed to be Adam of the Bible. He was excommunicated for apostasy in March 1847 and expelled from Winter Quarters. After his excommunication, McCary began attracting Latter Day Saint followers and instituted plural marriage among his group, and he had himself sealed to several white wives.

McCary's behavior angered many of the Latter Day Saints in Winter Quarters. Researchers have stated that his marriages to his white wives most likely had some influence on Young's decision to institute the priesthood and temple bans on black people. A statement from Young to McCary in March 1847 suggested that race had nothing to do with priesthood eligibility, but the earliest known statement about the priesthood restriction from any Mormon leader (including the implication that skin color might be relevant) was made by apostle Parley P. Pratt, a month after McCary was expelled from Winter Quarters. Speaking of McCary, Pratt stated that because he was a descendant of Ham, he was cursed with regards to the priesthood.

=== 1847–1880 ===
In 1847, Brigham Young became the second president of the LDS Church. Like many during that time, Young promoted the discrimination of black people. On February 13, 1849, an early statement by Young about the history of the priesthood ban in the LDS Church was made. The statement was given in response to Lorenzo Snow's inquiry about how redemption would come about with regards to black people. Young responded by mentioning the Curse of Cain and said that a similar hierarchy of power that was put in place on Earth because of the curse would remain in the afterlife. (Note: Young said that "the curse remained upon them because Cain cut off the lives of Abel, to prevent him and his posterity getting ascendancy over Cain and his generations, and to get the lead himself, his own offering not being accepted of God, while Abel's was. But the Lord had cursed Cain's seed with Blackness and prohibited them the priesthood that Abel and his progeny might yet come forward and have their dominion, place, and blessings in their proper relationship with Cain and his race in the world to come.") Young would make many similar remarks during the rest of his presidency.

==== 1879 meeting at the Smoot residence ====
On May 31, 1879, a meeting was held at the residence of Provo mayor Abraham O. Smoot to discuss the conflicting versions of Joseph Smith's views on black men and the priesthood, in response to Elijah Abel's petition to be sealed to his recently deceased wife. Abel, a black male convert to the church, had held the priesthood since 1836, and was now requesting an opportunity to enter the temple. President of the Quorum of the Twelve Apostles John Taylor, his secretary L. John Nuttall, mayor Smoot, apostle Brigham Young Jr. (son of the late prophet), and Zebedee Coltrin were in attendance. According to Nuttall, who detailed the meeting in his journal, Coltrin and Smoot made statements about all they could recollect Joseph Smith having ever said about black men and the priesthood.

John Taylor recounted a story he had remembered, in which Coltrin had at one time remarked that black people should not have the priesthood, to which Smith had responded with the account of the Apostle Peter's vision in Acts 10, in which he was commanded by God to "not call any man common or unclean" and to teach the Gentiles despite being a Jew himself, implying that black men should have the priesthood. However, Coltrin denied that this conversation had ever taken place. The recorded minutes of the meeting do not make it clear where Taylor originally heard the story.

Smoot, a Southerner from a line of enslavers, continued his practice of it in Utah. While a slaveholder of the South, he "once refused," writes W. Kesler Jackson, "to hand out campaign literature for Joseph Smith's bid for the [U.S.] presidency because part of Smith's platform included a denunciation of slavery and a plan for compensated emancipation" Smoot stated that he, Thomas B. Marsh, Warren Parrish, and David W. Patten had asked Joseph Smith in 1836 and 1838 if black men could have the priesthood. Joseph had told them that, while black people could be baptized, including those who were enslaved (but solely with their enslaver's consent), they could not hold the priesthood (it remains unclear, however, whether Smith was speaking regarding black individuals still in bondage). According to Nuttall, Coltrin and Smoot both wrote down their respective accounts during the course of the meeting and signed their names to them. The brethren later adjourned but would, following a brief recess, resume their discussion within a few days' time.

Some scholars of Mormon history describe the recollected statements given at the Smoot home in 1879 as "apocryphal", (Note: Stories considered by some to be "apocryphal" in nature continue to persist in collective memory, not only within Mormon culture generally (as the same may hold true in other faiths), but also as drawn from Elijah Abel's life specifically. These stories include the much-repeated anecdote that Elijah lived for a time with Joseph Smith and his family at the Prophet's Nauvoo "home" — which, if the tale holds merit, most likely refers to the Joseph Smith log Homestead near the Mississippi river shore. There is also the story that Elijah was present at the Mansion House bedside of the Prophet's father at the time of the elder Smith's death in 1840 (which death was the result of lingering complications stemming from the Commerce, Illinois Malaria epidemic of 1839-40). However, this last oft-quoted tradition (Arave, 2002) appears actually to carry some validity by virtue of Abel's well-documented "undertaker" role at Nauvoo in providing caskets for the bodies of the dead (and perhaps even interment services). A degree of credence is lent to the tale also by the "paternal" connection Elijah shared with his patriarch, who in 1836 laid his hands upon Abel's head and pronounced a most cherished "patriarchal blessing" upon the young elder.) or, collectively, as "an artifact [...] recorded forty-five years after the fact." In his biography of Abel, W. Kesler Jackson states that the two accounts given touching upon the doctrinal "priesthood and race" question contradict not only each other but also other historical records, just as the "facts" surrounding the actual priesthood ordination of Elijah Abel have long been contradictory, remaining for many years, until only recently, in a rather confused state.

=== 1880–1950 ===
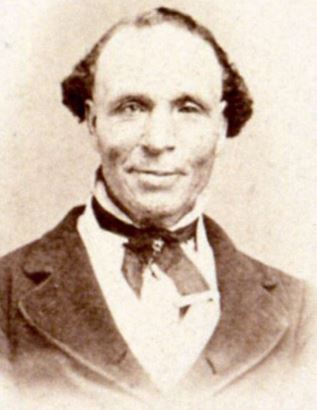
Elijah Abel was a black man given the priesthood during Smith's lifetime.

Under John Taylor's presidency (1880–1887), there was confusion in the church regarding the origin of the racial restrictions. Elijah Abel, an African American, after all had been ordained to the priesthood in the days of Joseph Smith. Apostle Joseph F. Smith argued that Abel's priesthood had been declared null and void by Joseph Smith, though this seems to conflict with Joseph F. Smith's teachings that the priesthood could not be removed from any man without removing that man from the church. Zebedee Coltrin and Abraham O. Smoot provided conflicting testimony of whether or not Joseph Smith stated that Abel was allowed hold the priesthood, though the veracity of their testimony is doubted. From this point on, many statements on the priesthood restriction were attributed to Joseph Smith; all such statements had actually been made by Brigham Young.

In 1947 the First Presidency, consisting of George Albert Smith, J. Reuben Clark, and David O. McKay, in a private communication with Dr. Lowry Nelson, where Dr. Nelson questioned whether "there is no irrevocable church doctrine on this subject [of black people and the priesthood]" the First Presidency stated:

The basic element of your ideas and concepts seems to be that all God's children stand in equal positions before Him in all things.

Your knowledge of the Gospel will indicate to you that this is contrary to the very fundamentals of God's dealings with Israel dating from the time of His promise to Abraham regarding Abraham's seed and their position vis-a~vis God Himself. Indeed, some of God's children were assigned to superior positions before the world was formed. We are aware that some Higher Critics do not accept this, but the Church does.

Your position seems to lose sight of the revelations of the Lord touching the preexistence of our spirits, the rebellion in heaven, and the doctrines that our birth into this life and the advantages under which we may be born, have a relationship in the life heretofore.

From the days of the Prophet Joseph even until now, it has been the doctrine of the Church, never questioned by any of the Church leaders, that the Negroes are not entitled to the full blessings of the Gospel.

Furthermore, your ideas, as we understand them, appear to contemplate the intermarriage of the Negro and White races, a concept which has heretofore been most repugnant to most normal-minded people...

Later, reflecting on this exchange with the First Presidency, Dr. Nelson would say, "I believe I was the first Mormon to protest the church policy with regard to blacks in a letter to the First Presidency of the church in 1947", and in 1953 published the article "Mormons and the Negro", saying that "This was the first [time] the non-Mormon world knew of this policy, and it was widely publicized through the Negro press."

In 1949, the First Presidency under the direction of George Albert Smith made a declaration which included the statement that the priesthood restriction was divinely commanded and not a matter of church policy. The declaration goes on to state that the conditions in which people are born on Earth are affected by their conduct in the premortal existence, although the details of the principle are said not to be known. It then says that the privilege of mortal existence is so great that spirits were willing to come to earth even though they would not be able to possess the priesthood. The mentioning of the curse of Cain began during this time period and took the place of previous justifications for the priesthood ban. The older arguments included the idea that black people were not as valiant in the pre-mortal life and that they had "inherent inferiority".

=== 1951–1977 ===
In 1954, church president David O. McKay taught: "There is not now, and there never has been a doctrine in this church that the negroes are under a divine curse. There is no doctrine in the church of any kind pertaining to the negro. We believe that we have a scriptural precedent for withholding the priesthood from the negro. It is a practice, not a doctrine, and the practice someday will be changed. And that's all there is to it."

In 1969, church apostle Harold B. Lee and member of the First Presidency Alvin R. Dyer blocked the LDS Church from rescinding the racial restrictions. The idea that a unanimous decision through revelation from God was needed to change the policy was and is a widespread belief among LDS church leaders. Although many desired a change in the racial policy, top leaders said they continued waiting for revelation concerning the matter.

David O. McKay told several people about his struggles with the restrictions, including Mildred Calderwood McKay, Marion D. Hanks, Lola Gygi Timmins, and Richard Jackson. Jackson quotes McKay as saying: "I'm badgered constantly about giving the priesthood to the Negro. I've inquired of the Lord repeatedly. The last time I did it was late last night. I was told, with no discussion, not to bring the subject up with the Lord again; that the time will come, but it will not be my time, and to leave the subject alone."

On December 15, 1969, members of the First Presidency, Hugh B. Brown and N. Eldon Tanner (President McKay was 96 years old and incapacitated at that time, dying the next month), released a First Presidency Statement, "Letter of First Presidency Clarifies Church's Position on the Negro" stating:

From the beginning of this dispensation, Joseph Smith and all succeeding presidents of the Church have taught that Negroes, while spirit children of a common Father, and the progeny of our earthly parents Adam and Eve, were not yet to receive the priesthood, for reasons which we believe are known to God, but which He has not made fully known to man.

Our living prophet, President David O. McKay, has said, "The seeming discrimination by the Church toward the Negro is not something which originated with man; but goes back into the beginning with God….

Revelation assures us that this plan antedates man's mortal existence, extending back to man's pre-existent state.

In her book, Contemporary Mormonism, Claudia Bushman describes the pain that was caused by the racial restrictions of the church. This struggle was felt both to black worshipers, who sometimes found themselves segregated and ostracized, and white members who were embarrassed by the exclusionary practices and who occasionally apostatized over the issue.

In 1971, three African-American Mormon men petitioned then–church president Joseph Fielding Smith to consider ways to keep black families involved in the church and also re-activate the descendants of black pioneers. As a result, Smith directed three apostles to meet with the men on a weekly basis until, on October 19, 1971, an organization called the Genesis Group was established as an auxiliary unit of LDS Church to meet the needs of black Mormons. The first president of the Genesis Group was Ruffin Bridgeforth, who also became the first black Latter Day Saint to be ordained a high priest after the priesthood ban was lifted later in the decade.

Harold B. Lee, president of the church, stated in 1972: "For those who don't believe in modern revelation there is no adequate explanation. Those who do understand revelation stand by and wait until the Lord speaks .... It's only a matter of time before the black achieves full status in the Church. We must believe in the justice of God. The black will achieve full status, we're just waiting for that time."

Although not refuting his belief that the restrictions came from the Lord, apostle Spencer W. Kimball acknowledged in 1963 that it could have been brought about through an error on man's part. In 1963, he said, "The doctrine or policy has not varied in my memory. I know it could. I know the Lord could change his policy and release the ban and forgive the possible error which brought about the deprivation."

==== 1970s white LDS opposition to ban ====
In the 1970s some white church members protested against teachings and policies excluding black members from temple ordinances and the priesthood. For instance, three members, John Fitzgerald, Douglas A. Wallace, and Byron Marchant, were all excommunicated by the LDS Church in the 1970s for publicly criticizing these teachings (in the years 1973, 1976, and 1977 respectively). In 1976, Wallace, a high priest in the Church ordained a black man, Larry Lester, as an Aaronic priest in an effort to force the LDS church to review its doctrines. The ordination was declared void because Wallace had not received prior authorization for the ordination. The next day, he attempted to enter the general conference to stage a demonstration. He was then legally barred from the following October conference, and his house was put under police surveillance during the subsequent April 1977 conference at the request of the LDS church and the FBI. Marchant was excommunicated for signaling the first "opposed" vote in modern church history during the sustaining of the church president in that conference. His vote was motivated by the temple and priesthood ban. He had also received previous media attention from a 1974 lawsuit that changed the church's policy banning even non-Mormon black Boy Scouts from acting as patrol leaders.

Other white members who publicly opposed some church teachings and policies around black people included Grant Syphers and his wife, who were denied access to the temple over their objections, with their San Francisco bishop stating that "Anyone who could not accept the Church's stand on Negroes ... could not go to the temple." Their stake president agreed and they were denied the temple recommend renewal. Additionally, Prominent LDS politician Stewart Udall (then acting as the United States Secretary of the Interior) wrote a strongly worded public letter in 1967 criticizing church racial restrictions. to which he received hundreds of critical response letters, including ones from apostles Delbert Stapley and Spencer Kimball.

== Racial restrictions end in 1978 ==
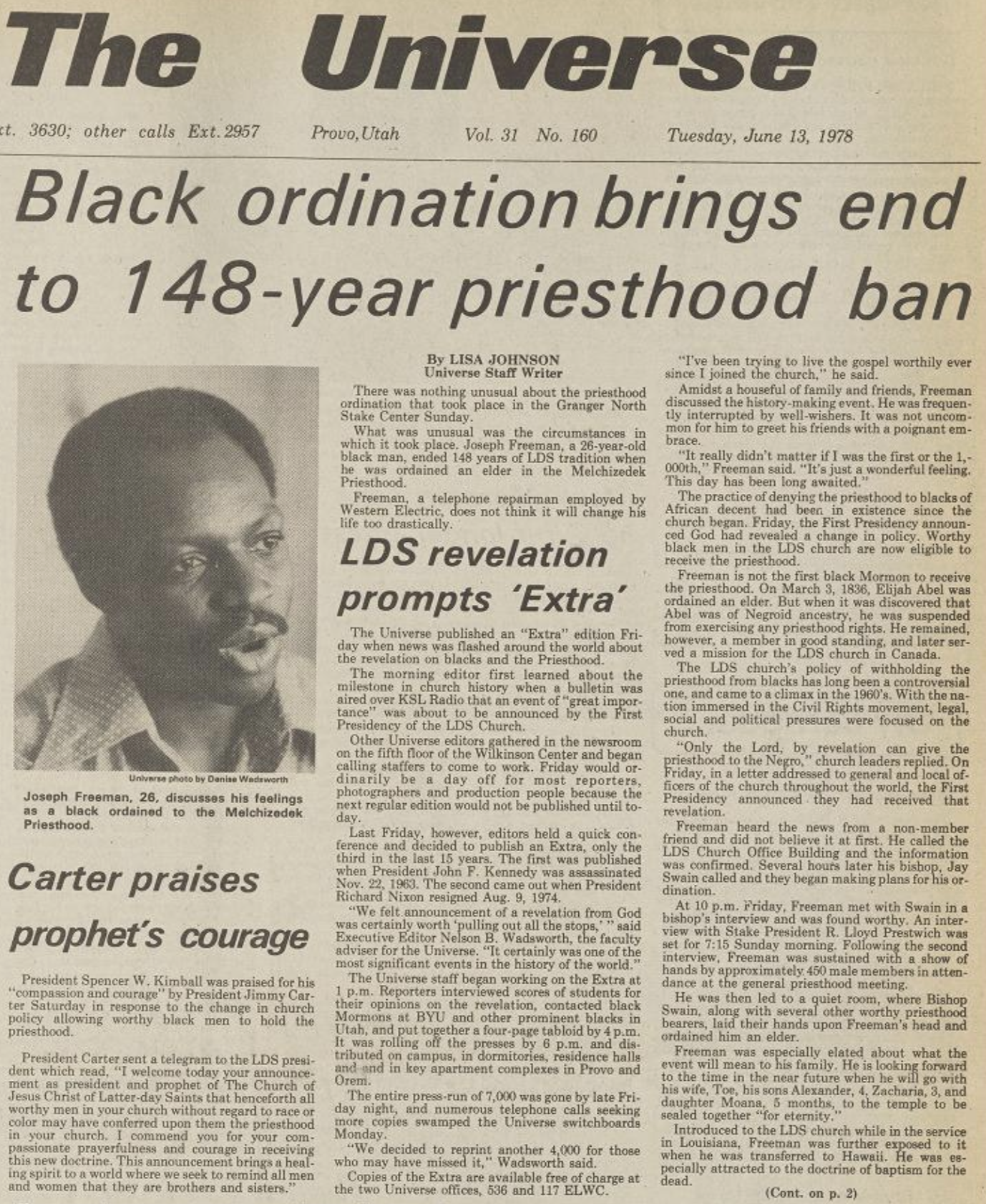
June 13, 1978 edition of BYU student newspaper The Universe about the end of the racial restrictions

In the 1970s, LDS Church president Spencer W. Kimball took General Conference on the road, holding area and regional conferences all over the world. He also announced many new temples to be built both in the United States and abroad, including one temple in São Paulo, Brazil. The problem of determining priesthood eligibility in Brazil was thought to be nearly impossible due to the mixing of the races in that country. When the temple was announced, church leaders realized the difficulty of restricting persons with African descent from attending the temple in Brazil.

On June 8, 1978, the First Presidency released to the press an official declaration, now a part of Doctrine and Covenants, which contained the following statement:

He has heard our prayers, and by revelation has confirmed that the long-promised day has come when every faithful, worthy man in the church may receive the Holy Priesthood, with power to exercise its divine authority, and enjoy with his loved ones every blessing that follows there from, including the blessings of the temple. Accordingly, all worthy male members of the church may be ordained to the priesthood without regard for race or color. Priesthood leaders are instructed to follow the policy of carefully interviewing all candidates for ordination to either the Aaronic or the Melchizedek Priesthood to insure that they meet the established standards for worthiness.

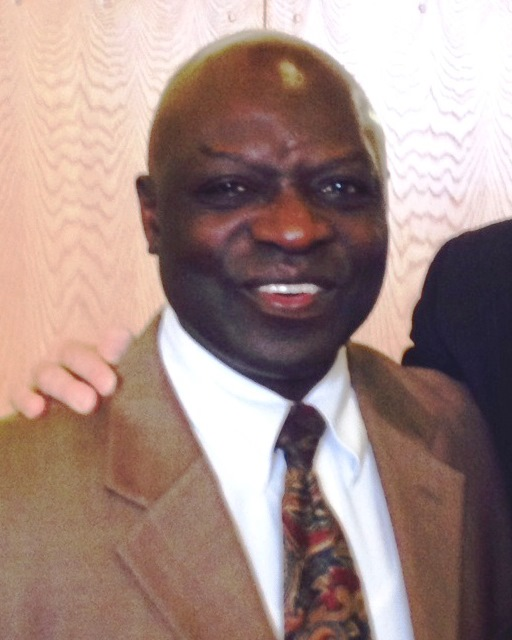
Joseph Freeman Jr. was the first black man to receive the priesthood after the ban was lifted in 1978.

According to first-person accounts, after much discussion among the First Presidency and the Quorum of the Twelve Apostles on this matter, they engaged the Lord in prayer. According to the writing of Bruce R. McConkie, "It was during this prayer that the revelation came. The Spirit of the Lord rested upon us all; we felt something akin to what happened on the day of Pentecost and at the Kirtland Temple. From the midst of eternity, the voice of God, conveyed by the power of the Spirit, spoke to his prophet. The message was that the time had now come to offer the fullness of the everlasting gospel, including celestial marriage, and the priesthood, and the blessings of the temple, to all men, without reference to race or color, solely on the basis of personal worthiness. And we all heard the same voice, received the same message, and became personal witnesses that the word received was the mind and will and voice of the Lord." Immediately after the receipt of this new revelation, an official announcement of the revelation was prepared, and sent out to all of the various leaders of the Church. It was then read to, approved by, and accepted as the word and will of the Lord, by a General Conference of the Church in October 1978. Succeeding editions of the Doctrine and Covenants were printed with this announcement canonized and entitled "Official Declaration 2".

Apostle Gordon B. Hinckley (a participant in the meetings to reverse the ban), in a churchwide fireside said, "Not one of us who was present on that occasion was ever quite the same after that. Nor has the Church been quite the same. All of us knew that the time had come for a change and that the decision had come from the heavens. The answer was clear. There was perfect unity among us in our experience and in our understanding."

The announcement about the removal of the priesthood ban was issued to the public in the weekly Church News supplement to the Deseret News, which also included admonitions from Kimball not to "cross racial lines in dating and marrying".

On June 11, 1978, three days after the announcement of the policy changes, Joseph Freeman, a member of the church since 1973, became the first black man to be ordained to the office of elder in the Melchizedek priesthood since the ban was lifted, while several others were ordained into the Aaronic priesthood that same day.

Later in 1978, McConkie called to repentance all those who questioned the changes with regards to the temple and priesthood bans. He went on to clarify that previous statements made by himself and other church leaders on the subject were to be forgotten and that the focus of the gospel should be on current teachings. (Note: Bruce R. McConkie said, "There are statements in our literature by the early brethren which we have interpreted to mean that the Negroes would not receive the priesthood in mortality. I have said the same things, and people write me letters and say, "You said such and such, and how is it now that we do such and such?" And all I can say to that is that it is time disbelieving people repented and got in line and believed in a living, modern prophet. Forget everything that I have said, or what President Brigham Young or President George Q. Cannon or whomsoever has said in days past that is contrary to the present revelation. We spoke with a limited understanding and without the light and knowledge that now has come into the world.... We get our truth and our light line upon line and precept upon precept. We have now had added a new flood of intelligence and light on this particular subject, and it erases all the darkness and all the views and all the thoughts of the past. They don't matter any more .... It doesn't make a particle of difference what anybody ever said about the Negro matter before the first day of June of this year." Bruce R. McConkie, 1978. All Are Alike Unto God, A SYMPOSIUM ON THE BOOK OF MORMON, The Second Annual Church Educational System Religious Educator's Symposium, August 17–19, 1978.)

Critics of the LDS Church state that the church's 1978 reversal of the racial restrictions was not divinely inspired as the church claimed, but simply a matter of political convenience, as the reversal of restrictions occurred as the church began to expand outside the United States into countries such as Brazil. These countries have ethnically mixed populations, and the reversal was announced just a few months before the church opened its new temple in São Paulo, Brazil.

The 1978 Declaration on Priesthood was an announcement by leaders of the Church of Jesus Christ of Latter-day Saints (LDS Church) that reversed a long-standing policy excluding men of black African descent from ordination to the denomination's priesthood and both black men and women from priesthood ordinances in the temple. Leaders stated it was a revelation from God.

Beginning in the 1850s, individuals of black African descent were prohibited from ordination to the LDS Church's priesthood—in other cases held by all male members who meet church standards of spiritual "worthiness"—and from receiving temple ordinances such as the endowment and celestial marriage (sealing). (Note: There were a handful of exceptions to this rule, such as some descendants of Elijah Abel, the first black Latter-day Saint to hold priesthood office. See Newell G. Bringhurst (2006), "The 'Missouri Thesis' Revisited: Early Mormonism, Slavery, and the Status of Black People" in Newell G. Bringhurst and Darron T. Smith, Black and Mormon (Urbana: University of Illinois Press) p. 30) LDS Church presidents Heber J. Grant and David O. McKay are known to have privately stated that the restriction was a temporary one, and would be lifted at a future date by a divine revelation to a church president.

In 2013, the LDS Church posted an essay about race and the priesthood.

=== Background ===
Men of black African descent were permitted to hold the priesthood in the early years of the Latter Day Saint movement, when Joseph Smith was alive. After Smith died, Brigham Young became leader of the LDS Church and many were excluded from holding the priesthood. This practice persisted after Young's death, and was maintained until 1978.

=== Events leading up to 1978 ===
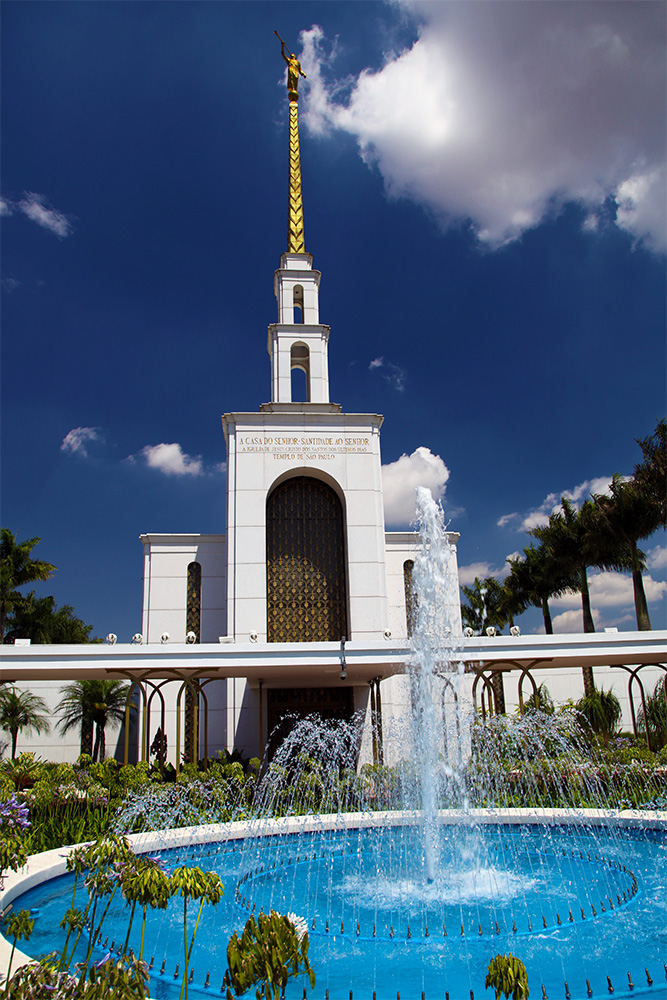
LDS temple in São Paulo, Brazil

In the decades leading up to the 1978 change, it became increasingly difficult for the church to maintain its policy on Africans and the priesthood. The difficulties arose both from outside protests and internal challenges encountered as the membership grew in far away areas of the world outside of the predominantly white Utah. Internal challenges in administering the priesthood ban were mainly due to the difficulty in determining which peoples were of African ancestry in areas such as Brazil, the Philippines and Caribbean and Polynesian Islands as well as shortages of available people for local church leadership positions in areas with a predominantly black population such as Nigeria or the Dominican Republic.

The majority of the protests against the policy coincided with the rise of the civil rights movement in the United States during the 1960s. In 1963, Hugh B. Brown made a statement on civil rights during General Conference in order to avert a planned protest of the conference by the NAACP. During the late 1960s and 1970s, black athletes at some universities refused to compete against teams from church owned Brigham Young University. A protest in 1974 was in response to the exclusion of black scouts to become leaders in church sponsored Boy Scout troops.

In the 1960s, an effort was made to establish a church presence in Nigeria where many natives had expressed interest. Church leaders found it difficult to make progress in establishing the church in that region without a change in the priesthood policy. Issues regarding possible expansion in Nigeria were considered in correspondence between the South African Mission and church general authorities from as early as 1946. LDS Church leaders in the Caribbean, notably in the Dominican Republic (described at the time as 98% black), had expressed the difficulty of proselytizing efforts in the region due to priesthood restrictions.

In 1969, during a weekly meeting the apostles voted to overturn the priesthood ban. However, Harold B. Lee, a senior apostle at the time, was not present due to travel. When he returned he made the argument that the ban could not be overturned administratively but rather required a revelation from God. Lee called for a re-vote, which did not pass.

On March 1, 1975, LDS Church president Spencer W. Kimball announced plans to build a temple in São Paulo, Brazil. Before the 1978 ban removal, not only were men of black African descent denied ordination to the priesthood, but men and women of black African descent were also excluded from performing most of the various ordinances in the temple. Determining priesthood and temple eligibility in Brazil was problematic due to the considerable intermarriage between Amerindians, Europeans, and Africans since 1500, and high uncertainty in tracing ancestral roots. Furthermore, in the Brazilian culture, racial identification had more to do with physical appearance and social class than blood lines. The cultural differences in understanding race created confusion between the native Brazilians and the American missionaries. When the temple was announced, church leaders realized the difficulty of restricting persons with various bloodlines from attending the temple in Brazil.

During the first half of the 20th century, most church members and leaders believed the priesthood ban had originated with church founder Joseph Smith. Because of this belief, church leaders were hesitant to overturn the ban. Scholars in the 1960s and 1970s found no evidence of the prohibition before Brigham Young. This evidence made it easier for Kimball to consider making a change.

==== Softening of the policy ====
Prior to the complete overturning of the priesthood ban, several administrative actions were taken to soften its effect.

Before David O. McKay visited the South Africa mission in 1954, the policy was that any man desiring to receive the priesthood in the mission was required to prove a lack of African ancestors in his genealogy. Six missionaries were tasked with assisting in the necessary genealogical research but even then it was often difficult to establish lack of African ancestry. McKay changed the policy to presume non-African ancestry except when there was evidence to the contrary. This change allowed many more people to be ordained without establishing genealogical proof.

Four years later, McKay gave permission for Fijians to receive the priesthood despite their dark skin color. Thus, the priesthood ban was restricted to those people who were specifically of African descent. In 1967, the same policy that was used in South Africa was extended to cover Brazilians as well. In 1974, black people were allowed to serve as proxies for baptisms for the dead.

=== The 1978 ban reversal ===
In the years prior to his presidency, Spencer W. Kimball kept a binder of notes and clippings related to the issue. In the first years of his presidency, he was recorded as frequently making the issue one of investigation and prayer. In June 1977, Kimball asked at least three general authorities—apostles Bruce R. McConkie, Thomas S. Monson, and Boyd K. Packer—to submit memos "on the doctrinal basis of the prohibition and how a change might affect the Church", to which McConkie wrote a long treatise concluding there were no scriptural impediments to a change. During 1977, Kimball obtained a personal key to the Salt Lake Temple for entering in the evenings after the temple closed, and often spent hours alone in its upper rooms praying for divine guidance on a possible change. On May 30, 1978, Kimball presented his two counselors with a statement he had written in longhand removing all racial restrictions on ordination to the priesthood, stating that he "had a good, warm feeling about it."

On June 1, 1978, following the monthly meeting of general authorities in the Salt Lake Temple, Kimball asked his counselors and the ten members of Quorum of the Twelve Apostles then present (Note: Mark E. Petersen was in Ecuador on an assignment and Delbert L. Stapley was in the hospital receiving medical care.) to remain behind for a special meeting. Kimball began by describing his studies, thoughts, and prayers on removing the restriction and on his growing assurance that the time had come for the change. Kimball asked each of the men present to share their views, and all spoke in favor of changing the policy. After all present had shared their views, Kimball led the gathered apostles in a prayer circle to seek final divine approval for the change. As Kimball prayed, many in the group recorded feeling a powerful spiritual confirmation. Bruce R. McConkie later said: "There are no words to describe the sensation, but simultaneously the Twelve and the three members of the First Presidency had the Holy Ghost descend upon them and they knew that God had manifested his will .... I had had some remarkable spiritual experiences before ... but nothing of this magnitude." cited in L. Tom Perry described: "I felt something like the rushing of wind. There was a feeling that came over the whole group. When President Kimball got up he was visibly relieved and overjoyed." Gordon B. Hinckley later said: "For me, it felt as if a conduit opened between the heavenly throne and the kneeling, pleading prophet of God who was joined by his Brethren."

The church formally announced the change on June 9, 1978. The story led many national news broadcasts and was on the front page of most American newspapers, and in most largely LDS communities in Utah and Idaho telephone networks were completely jammed with excited callers. The announcement was formally approved by the church at the October 1978 general conference, and is included in LDS Church's edition of the Doctrine and Covenants as Official Declaration 2.

=== Ban lift presented at general conference ===
On September 30, 1978, during the church's 148th Semiannual General Conference, the following was presented by N. Eldon Tanner, First Counselor in the First Presidency:

In early June of this year, the First Presidency announced that a revelation had been received by President Spencer W. Kimball extending priesthood and temple blessings to all worthy male members of the Church. President Kimball has asked that I advise the conference that after he had received this revelation, which came to him after extended meditation and prayer in the sacred rooms of the holy temple, he presented it to his counselors, who accepted it and approved it. It was then presented to the Quorum of the Twelve Apostles, who unanimously approved it, and was subsequently presented to all other General Authorities, who likewise approved it unanimously.

On that day, the general conference unanimously voted to accept the policy changes "as the word and will of the Lord."

=== Ramifications ===
Following the ban reversal, black male members were allowed to be ordained to the priesthood. Black members and their spouses regardless of race were allowed to enter the temple and undergo the temple rituals, including celestial marriages. Black members could be adopted into a tribe of Israel through a patriarchal blessing. Black members were also allowed to serve missions and hold leadership positions. Proselytization restrictions were removed, so missionaries no longer needed special permission to teach black people, converts were no longer asked about African heritage, and marks were no longer made on membership records indicating African heritage.

=== Statements after the ban reversal ===
Later in 1978, apostle Bruce R. McConkie said:

There are statements in our literature by the early brethren which we have interpreted to mean that the Negroes would not receive the priesthood in mortality. I have said the same things, and people write me letters and say, "You said such and such, and how is it now that we do such and such?" And all I can say to that is that it is time disbelieving people repented and got in line and believed in a living, modern prophet. Forget everything that I have said, or what President Brigham Young or President George Q. Cannon or whomsoever has said in days past that is contrary to the present revelation. We spoke with a limited understanding and without the light and knowledge that now has come into the world.... We get our truth and our light line upon line and precept upon precept. We have now had added a new flood of intelligence and light on this particular subject, and it erases all the darkness and all the views and all the thoughts of the past. They don't matter any more.... It doesn't make a particle of difference what anybody ever said about the Negro matter before the first day of June of this year.

On the topic of doctrine and policy for the race ban lifting the apostle Dallin H. Oaks stated in 1988, "I don't know that it's possible to distinguish between policy and doctrine in a church that believes in continuing revelation and sustains its leader as a prophet. ... I'm not sure I could justify the difference in doctrine and policy in the fact that before 1978 a person could not hold the priesthood and after 1978 they could hold the priesthood." In 2013, the LDS Church posted an essay on the priesthood ban, stating that the ban was based more on racism than the will of God. The essay places the origin of the ban on Brigham Young, arguing there was no evidence any black men were denied the priesthood during Joseph Smith's leadership. The essay also disavowed theories promoted in the past including "that black skin is a sign of divine disfavor or curse, or that it reflects actions in a premortal life; that mixed-race marriages are a sin; or that blacks or people of any other race or ethnicity are inferior in any way to anyone else."

=== Official Declaration 2 ===
Official Declaration 2 is the canonized formal 1978 announcement by the church's First Presidency that the priesthood would no longer be subject to restrictions based on race or skin color. The declaration was canonized by the LDS Church at its general conference on September 30, 1978, through the process of common consent. Since 1981, the text has been included in the church's Doctrine and Covenants, one of its standard works of scripture. It is the most recent text that has been added to the LDS Church's open canon of scripture. The announcement that was canonized had previously been announced by a June 8, 1978, letter from the First Presidency, which was composed of Spencer W. Kimball, N. Eldon Tanner, and Marion G. Romney.

Unlike much of the Doctrine and Covenants, Official Declaration 2 is not itself presented as a revelation from God. However, its text announces that Jesus Christ "by revelation has confirmed that the long-promised day has come when every faithful, worthy man in the Church may receive the holy priesthood." Thus, it is regarded as "the official declaration of the revelation." No text of the revelation from God has been released by the church, but it is common for adherents to refer to the "revelation on the priesthood" in describing the changes wrought by the announcement and canonization of Official Declaration 2.

=== Modern disavowal of previously given reasons for restrictions ===
Sometime between 2014 and 2015, the LDS Church published an essay titled "Race and the Priesthood". As part of that essay, the church officially stated that the reasons for the previous racial restrictions were unknown, and officially disavowed the racist explanations for the policy, but did not disavow the restrictions themselves. As part of the 40th anniversary celebration of the ban reversal, Dallin H. Oaks said that, "the Lord rarely gives reasons for the commandments and directions He gives to His servants," but acknowledged the hurt that the restrictions caused before they were rescinded, and encouraged all church members to move past those feelings and focus on the future. As of 2019 the LDS Church has not apologized for its race-based policies and former teachings.

== After the restrictions' lifting (1978 to 2013) ==
Since the 1978 ban reversal, the church has made no distinctions in policy for black people, but it remains an issue for many black members of the church. Alvin Jackson, a black bishop in the LDS Church, puts his focus on "moving forward rather than looking back." In an interview with Mormon Century, Jason Smith expressed his viewpoint that the membership of the church was not ready for black people to have the priesthood in the early years of the church, because of prejudice and black enslavement. He drew analogies to the Bible where only the Israelites have the gospel.

In a 1997 TV interview, President Gordon B. Hinckley was asked whether the church was wrong to deny the priesthood. He responded, "No, I don't think it was wrong. It, things, various things happened in different periods. There's a reason for them."

In April 2006 in a general conference talk President Gordon B. Hinckley, the president of the LDS Church, had called racism "ugly" and a sin that any guilty of needed to repent from.

In 1995, black church member A. David Jackson asked church leaders to issue a declaration repudiating past doctrines that denied various privileges to black people. In particular, Jackson asked the church to disavow the 1949 "Negro Question" declaration from the church Presidency which stated that "the attitude of the church with reference to negroes ... is not a matter of the declaration of a policy but of direct commandment from the Lord ... to the effect that negroes ... are not entitled to the priesthood."

The church leadership did not issue a repudiation, and so in 1997 Jackson, aided by other church members including Armand Mauss, sent a second request to church leaders, which stated that white Mormons felt that the 1978 changes resolved everything, but that black Mormons react differently when they learn the details. He said that many black Mormons become discouraged and leave the church or become inactive. "When they find out about this, they exit... You end up with the passive African Americans in the church."

Other black church members think giving an apology would be a "detriment" to church work and a catalyst to further racial misunderstanding. African American church member Bryan E. Powell says, "There is no pleasure in old news, and this news is old." Gladys Newkirk agrees, stating, "I've never experienced any problems in this church. I don't need an apology. ... We're the result of an apology." The large majority of black Mormons say they are willing to look beyond the previous teachings and remain with the church in part because of its powerful, detailed teachings on life after death.

Church president Hinckley told the Los Angeles Times: "The 1978 declaration speaks for itself ... I don't see anything further that we need to do." Apostle Dallin H. Oaks said:

It's not the pattern of the Lord to give reasons. We can put reasons to commandments. When we do we're on our own. Some people put reasons to [the ban] and they turned out to be spectacularly wrong. There is a lesson in that .... The lesson I've drawn from that, I decided a long time ago that I had faith in the command and I had no faith in the reasons that had been suggested for it .... I'm referring to reasons given by general authorities and reasons elaborated upon [those reasons] by others. The whole set of reasons seemed to me to be unnecessary risk taking .... Let's [not] make the mistake that's been made in the past, here and in other areas, trying to put reasons to revelation. The reasons turn out to be man-made to a great extent. The revelations are what we sustain as the will of the Lord and that's where safety lies.

== 2013 to present ==
On December 6, 2013, the LDS Church published an essay entitled "Race and the Priesthood" on its official website. The essay stated that "there is no evidence that any black men were denied the priesthood during Joseph Smith's lifetime," but that the priesthood restrictions were first publicly introduced by Brigham Young, stating the racism of the era that influenced his thinking. The essay went on to declare that "Today the Church disavows the theories advanced in the past that black skin is a sign of divine disfavor or curse, or that it reflects actions in a premortal life that mixed-race marriages are a sin; or that blacks or people of any other race or ethnicity are inferior in any way to anyone else. Church leaders today unequivocally condemn all racism, past and present, in any form."

While the essay was approved by the First Presidency, it was not written by them. As of 2015, it has never been mentioned, alluded to, or footnoted in speeches by LDS authorities at the faith's biannual General Conferences. Many members remain unaware of the essays and some hold to racist beliefs that had been taught in the past.

According to Richard Bushman, a Mormon historian, the essay removes the revelatory significance of the ban. He states that it requires a reorientation of Mormon thinking, since "it brings into question all of the prophet's inspiration." Critics argue that it could call into question other teachings of the prophets they say are commands from God.

Although the priesthood restrictions existed historically, the LDS Church reports continued significant growth in church membership in Africa, with growth from 318,947 members in 2010 to 578,310 in 2018. As of 2019, there are two church general authorities of African descent, and another general authority of Melanesian (Fijian) descent.

In response to a 2016 survey of self-identified Mormons, over 60 percent expressed that they either know (37 percent) or believe (25.5 percent) that the priesthood/temple ban was God's will, with another 17 percent expressing that it might be true, and 22 percent saying they know or believe it is false.

== See also ==
- Black people and early Mormonism
- Black people and patriarchal blessings
- Criticism of the LDS Church
- Interracial marriage and the LDS Church
- Mormonism and Pacific Islanders
- Mormon teachings on skin color
- Native American people and Mormonism
