= Lynching of William Harvey =

Murder of Black man in Salt Lake City, Utah

William Harvey
- Born: Circa 1848
- Died: August 25, 1883 (aged 34–35); Salt Lake City, Utah
- Cause of death: Lynching at State Street and 100 South Street
- Burial place: Outside the Salt Lake City Cemetery
- Other name: Sam Joe
- Occupation: Shoeshiner

William "Sam Joe" Harvey (c. 1848 – August 25, 1883) was a 35-year-old Black US Army veteran who was accused of killing the Salt Lake City police chief Andrew H. Burt on August 25, 1883. Upon arrest Harvey was severely kicked and beaten by the police. A mob of up to 2,000 White people formed in front of the city jail, and the officers handed him over to them. The mob hanged him there then dragged his body for several blocks down State Street.

== See also ==
- List of lynching victims in the United States
- Murder of Thomas Coleman
- Lynching of Robert Marshall
