= Lynching of Robert Marshall =

1925 Murder of Black man in Utah

Robert Marshall
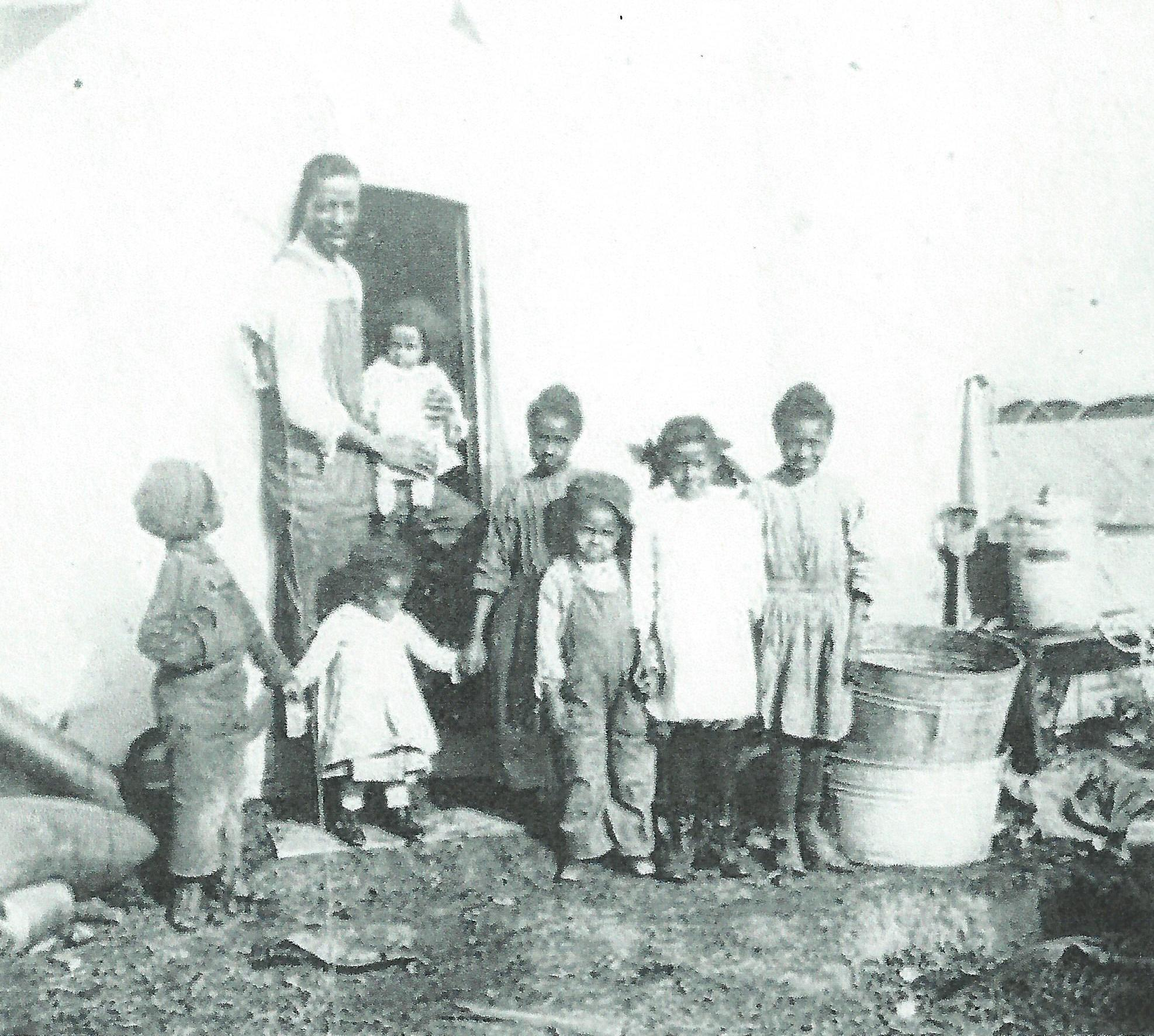
- Marshall in Ludlow, Colorado a few years before his death
- Born: Circa 1885; Arkansas
- Died: June 18, 1925 (aged 39–40); Castle Gate, Utah
- Cause of death: Lynching
- Other names: Bob
- Occupation: Coal miner

Robert "Bob" Marshall (1885 - June 18, 1925) was an African American itinerant coal miner from Arkansas. On June 18, 1925, Marshall was lynched by the Ku Klux Klan for allegedly killing a white guard in Carbon County, Utah.

== Background ==
Marshall was believed to have shot James Milton Burns, a watchman for Utah Fuel Company, at Castle Gate on June 15, 1925. The murder particularly affected the little town of Price, Utah, given its brutality: Burns was shot five times, beaten on the head with a revolver, and kicked in the head. Nobody witnessed Burns' murder but Robert Marshall ended up being identified as the man fleeing from the scene by two to three children who were playing nearby. A search party was then organized by Carbon County sheriff Ray Deming to find Marshall. One hundred and fifty men searched for him during the night without finding him. On June 16, 1925, James Milton Burns died as a result of his injuries, which only reinforced the tensions within the city, but also in the police department, and resulted in a manhunt which lasted for almost two days.

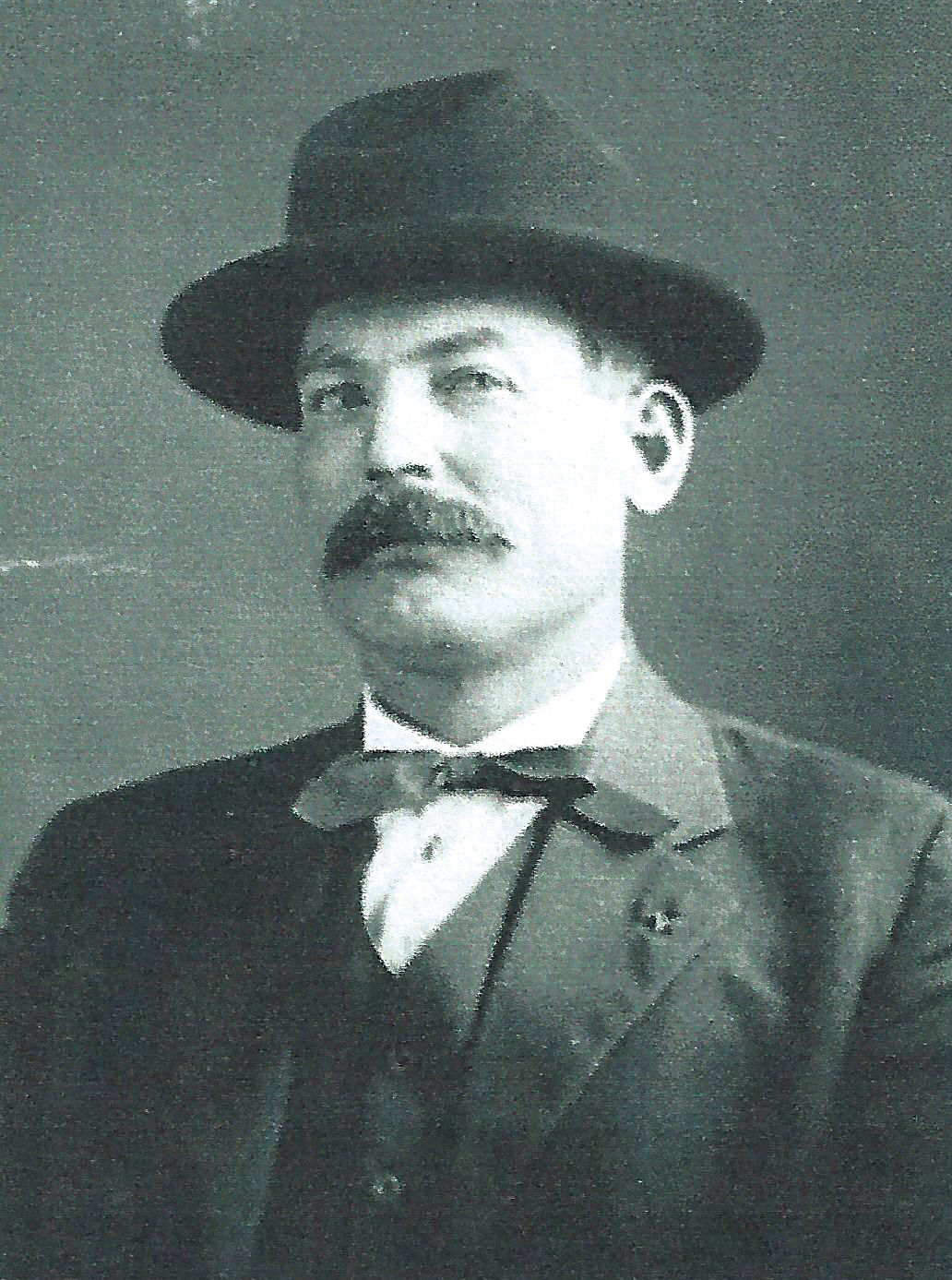
James Milton Burns

During the night, on June 17, 1925, Marshall found refuge in his cabin, which he was sharing with a fellow black miner, George Gray. The next morning, on June 18, while Marshall was sleeping, Gray went to the Utah Fuel Company headquarters in Castle Gate and informed them that Marshall had got back to the cabin the night before.

Shortly after, around 9:30 AM, and under the orders of Deputy Sheriff Henry East, Robert Marshall was arrested by a nine-man posse.

== Lynching ==
After being arrested, Marshall was being escorted by car to the Carbon County Courthouse at Price, where he was to put in jail pending the filing of charges against him for the murder of Burns. The citizens of Price had been informed of Marshall's arrest, and up to a thousand men, women, and children gathered, waiting for him and preparing for what they called the "necktie party."

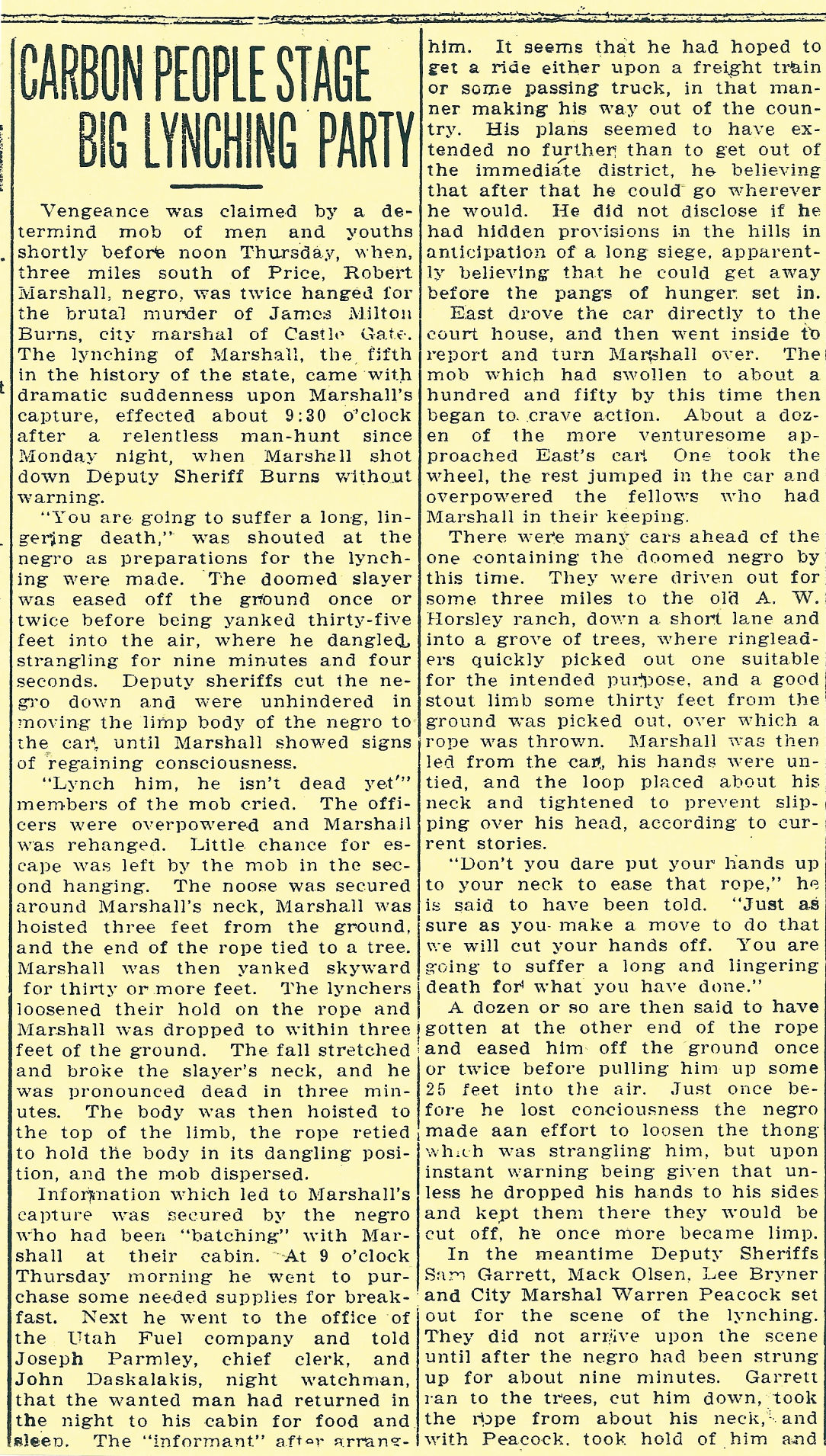
Newspaper article reporting Robert Marshall's lynching

Marshall's escort was quickly informed by Sheriff Deming that a lynch mob was forming in town. Once the officers and Marshall reached town, they were stopped by a lynch crowd in front of the courthouse. Marshall was not led inside of the courthouse and Deputy Sheriff East left him inside the car, which was then commandeered by members of the crowd. A procession of "at least a hundred cars" led Marshall to a tall cottonwood tree on the Critchlow farm, east of Price, where he was hanged.

Ten minutes later, three deputies arrived at the scene and got Marshall on the ground. The crowd quickly realized that he was still breathing and hanged him a second time. Marshall's neck broke and he died instantly.

== Aftermath ==
After Marshall's death, an investigation was carried out by District Attorney Fred W. Keller and County Attorney Oliver K. Clay. Though Sheriff Deming and his deputies aimed at not revealing the identities of the lynchers, five warrants were issued on June 20, 1925, charging Charlie Atwood, barber; Joseph Golding, proprietor of Golding Brothers Vulcanizing Works; George O'Neill, barber; Morgan King, Price city electrician; and Henry East, deputy sheriff of Castle Gate and special agent for Utah Fuel Company at Castle Gate. All five were charged for pulling up the rope. On June 21, six other people were charged for being accomplices. The "Carbon County Eleven," were charged with the account of first degree murder and were put in jail. It was well known that all 11 of those charged, along with James Burns himself, were members of the Ku Klux Klan.

During their time in jail, the eleven alleged lynchers were praised and celebrated for Marshall's murder. On June 30, 1925, The Salt Lake Telegram reported: "The prisoners have been the idols of Carbon County citizens since they have been incarcerated in the county jail, according to the sheriff's officers, citizens in sympathy with the alleged lynchers made pilgrimages from various sections of the county and brought foodstuffs, delicacies and candy to the prisoners during the past ten days."

Men Held for Lynching Are out on Bond, Salt Lake Telegram, June 30, 1925

Under the pressure of Governor George Dern and State Attorney General Harvey Cluff, District Attorney Fred W. Keller and County Attorney Oliver K. Clay decided to summon a grand jury instead of proceeding to a trial. On June 30, 1925, the Carbon County Eleven were released on bail. The grand jury opened on July 28, 1925, and even though all one hundred and twenty five witnesses of the lynching knew the identity of the killers, none of them testified. On August 28, 1925, the Grand Jury concluded that there was not sufficient evidence to convict the Carbon County Eleven, and they were released.

After the verdict, local newspaper the Sun ran a front-page editorial headlined "All is well that ends well" before proclaiming "If these eleven men are in any danger of severe punishment this community is not awake to such a condition. And there is a fast growing a feeling that is about time that the matter was closed up." Later on, the editor explained: "The general sentiment of the folks of Carbon county is that even were the men under accusation the actual perpetrators of the lynching there was little to be gained by carrying the matter to a point where they would be severely dealt with."

== Significance ==
Today, Robert Marshall's lynching is known as the "Last Lynching of the American West." In 1998, a gravestone was dedicated to Robert Marshall and was inscribed with "Robert Marshall. Lynched June 18, 1925. A Victim of Intolerance. May God Forgive."

In 2005, the United States Senate adopted Resolution 39, a resolution that not only referred to Robert Marshall's case, but also to all the victims of lynching around the United States. Resolution 39 was "A resolution apologizing to the victims of lynching and the descendants of those victims for the failure of the Senate to enact anti-lynching legislation." The upper chamber (1) "apologizes to the victims of lynching for the failure of the Senate to enact anti-lynching legislation"; (2) expresses the deepest sympathies and most solemn regrets of the Senate to the descendants of victims of lynching, the ancestors of whom were deprived of life, human dignity, and the constitutional protections accorded all citizens of the United States; and (3) remembers the history of lynching, to ensure that these tragedies will be neither forgotten nor repeated."

Robert Marshall's lynching still deeply impacts and divides the local community of Carbon County, a "county [that] is an anomaly in a state that is overwhelmingly anti-union, Republican and Mormon." The 1998 commemoration was extremely debated amongst Price citizens: Salt Lake City organizers argued that it was a ceremony of "reconciliation and forgiveness" whilst some others claimed it only twisted the knife in the wound and tried "to make a martyr out of a murderer." If it was later acknowledged by historians that Marshall did shoot Burns, his lynching, like all the others, represents yet another miscarriage of justice in the American system.

== See also ==
- Murder of Thomas Coleman
- Lynching of William Harvey
