= Lucy Celesta Stanton =

Lucy Stanton McCary (1816–1878) was a Mormon woman who married and followed William McCary during his time as a prominent member of the LDS community at Winter Quarters in Ohio. She played a prominent role during William McCary's apostasy and followed him during his excommunication and prophetic claims. Her relationship with William McCary influenced early Latter Day Saint policy and doctrine in regards to race, sexuality, and gender roles. Many scholars argue that the LDS Church's ban on interracial marriage and the ordination of peoples of African descent to the priesthood was influenced by Lucy Stanton's relationship with Milliam McCary and the events that followed in Winter Quarters Ohio.

== Early life ==
Lucy Stanton Bassett, also known as Lucy Celesta Stanton, also known as Laah Ciel Manatoi, was born in New York on December 28, 1816. Her father was Daniel Stanton and her mother was Clarinda Graves; Lucy grew up with seven siblings, five sisters and two brothers. Soon after Lucy was born, her and her family moved to Missouri. This move to the southern United States was in reaction to a treaty that was agreed upon by the Delaware Indians, a tribe of which the Stanton's were a part of (later in her life, Lucy Stanton would write about her opposition to forced relocation of Native Americans). The treaty, created in 1818 included the relocation of the Delaware tribe to the James Fork of the White River in Missouri.

In 1833 she married a man named Oliver Harmon Bassett. Around the year 1839 Lucy and her husband moved to Quincy, Illinois in Adams County with their three children. The first of their children was Solon Plumb Bassett born in 1834, next was Anna Clarinda Seraphine Bassett born in 1837, and last was Semera LaCelestine Roslin Bassett. In 1843 Lucy and her husband were divorced. Another treaty with the Delaware Indians required Lucy's family to move again. This time they moved close to the Kansas-Missouri border. It was here that Lucy Stanton met William McCary, an African American man, a former slave, and convert to the Church of Jesus Christ of Latter-Day Saints who had escaped from his master in his youth. In the time of early 1846 Lucy Stanton and William McCary got married. This marriage between a white woman and an African American man was frowned upon in the LDS community. The Church of Jesus Christ of Latter-day Saints famously had a ban on black Africans receiving the priesthood soon after this time and the fear of interracial marriages, such as Stanton's and McCary's, was seen as a big reason for that ban.

== Marriage to William McCary ==
While in Council Bluffs, Iowa, Lucy Stanton married William McCary, a skilled ventriloquist and musician in 1846. Her marriage to William McCary was not originally questioned on the bounds of church doctrine, as early church teachings did not restrict membership or marriage until shortly after McCary's excommunication. Shortly after her marriage, both Lucy and William both joined the Latter Day Saints in Winter quarters Nebraska in 1847.

== Achievements ==
A Thrilling Sketch of the Life of the Distinguished Chief Okah Tubbee

After her marriage to William McCary, Lucy Stanton was encouraged to write a narrative on the life of her husband. She was told to write this narrative by a man named Reverend Lewis Allen. Stanton wrote a sketch of McCary's life entitled A Thrilling Sketch of the Life of the Distinguished Chief Okah Tubbee (Okah Tubbee being the name that William McCary assumed when living among Native Americans). In the original publication of this narrative, Reverend Allen was identified as the only author. However, revised versions published soon after credited Lucy Stanton under her Native American name, Laah Ceil.

An 1852 version of this narrative was eventually published and it included more accounts written by Okah Tubbee himself. At the end of his narrative Okah Tubbee wishes to let Laah Ceil (Lucy Stanton) "speak for herself, for she does not like to hear me say that we made an engagement the first day, made an acquaintance the next, and was married so soon".

Stanton used this opportunity to write about her education and religious convictions as well as give her own account about the beginnings of her relationship with Okah Tubbee. She wrote about her travels with her husband and their advocation for the rights of Native Americans and their opposition to forced relocation; this was likely based on her and her family's experience with relocation in her childhood. Lucy Stanton and her husband's visits to various groups of Native Americans such as the Choctaw Indians in Alexandria were recorded in this document. This expanded version of Tubbee's life sketch also included Tubbee's accounts of his early life before his marriage to Lucy Stanton. During his solo travels Tubbee also visited the Creek and Seminole Indians with a message that whites "would never give up the chase until the Indian was no longer an inhabitant of that soil". This message was unwelcome to these Native American groups that Tubbee encountered.

Lucy Stanton's writing in this revised narrative also included an original poem as well as some letters and documents.

== Excommunication and spiritualism ==
During their time at winter quarters, William McCary began to claim various powers and spiritual authority that wasn't condoned or accepted by the LDS Church leadership, the most famous of these supposed gifts was the ability to appear as various characters from the Bible and Book of Mormon. Following McCary's excommunication for Apostacy, Lucy Stanton remained with him and followed him after leaving Winter Quarters. This expulsion resulted in Orson Hyde preaching a sermon against McCary and his claims, however many church members would continue to follow him and Lucy a short distance away from Winter Quarters. After leaving Winter quarters, Lucy and William both continue to gather more early Latter Day Saints to McCary's unique brand of Mormonism. Direct evidence of Lucy's complicity and influence over McCary's ideological doctrine rests in the reinstitution of plural marriage and sealing ceremonies that involved sex only between William and Lucy. It is difficult to tell exactly how much Lucy Stanton influenced the doctrinal aspects of McCary's theology, as no documents survive from either William or Lucy that describe its conception in any meaningful way.

== Effect on LDS doctrine ==
Scholars differ on exactly how much Lucy and William affected mainstream LDS Church doctrine, but many have theorized that the behavior of Lucy and William encouraged the priesthood ban on African Americans. In particular, his marriages to multiple white wives provoked disdain from several Latter Day Saints in Winter Quarters. Originally, Brigham Young assured William McCary that race was not an issue in the Church ("It's nothing to do with the blood for [from] one blood has God made all flesh, we have to repent [to] regain what we av lost — we av one of the best Elders an African in Lowell [referring to Walker Lewis]). Only one month after William and Lucy’s excommunication, Parly P. Pratt made the earliest known statement regarding a restriction of blacks receiving the priesthood made by a church leader.

The Church's rhetoric towards African Americans and the priesthood would only become more antagonistic during Lucy and William’s behaviors outside Winter quarters drew more and more women away from mainstream Mormonism. Speaking of William McCary, Pratt stated that he “was a black man that had the blood of Ham in him which lineage cursed as regards with priesthood”. Statements regarding Lucy Stanton specifically are unknown, but the cultural background under which Lucy and William are being written assumes a patriarchal leadership that William and lucy didn't follow to the same degree as other early Latter Day Saints.

While historians agree that multiple factors, both political and doctrinal, contributed to the LDS Church's policy towards ethnic minorities, specifically those of African descent, William McCarry is the earliest such man to be spoken out against by church leaders. The nature of the sexual practices William and Lucy engaged in with other church members at Winter Quarters provoked stern reaction from rank and file members of the organization, as the details of these practices were particularly forbidden by church leadership and believed to be the result of corrupted priesthood authority. In addition to this, because Lucy Stanton came from a particularly important and pious family in the early LDS Church, and her perceived apostate activity deeply grieved and concerned other members who feared the same fate for other own family members.

Scholars argue that because the second restriction on blacks and priesthood was temple marriages, church leaders, particularly Brigham Young, had William and Lucy's marriage in mind when making the decision as an attempt to prevent more pious women from doing the same as Lucy Stanton and their followers. At the same time, White skin became synonymous with righteousness, arguably driven by Lucy and William's example. After Brigham Young officially instituted the temple and priesthood ban in 1847 the LDS Church generally forbade people of African descent from holding the office of the priesthood or participating in temple rituals until 1978 when the Church would formally reverse this policy.

== Death ==
Lucy Celesta Stanton died in Springville, Utah in 1878.
