= William McCary =

African-American man expelled from the LDS Church (fl.1811-1854)

Warner "William" McCary (c. 1811 – after 1854) was an African American convert to Mormonism who was excommunicated from the Church of Jesus Christ of Latter-day Saints (LDS Church) in 1847 for claiming to be a prophet. Some researchers have suggested that McCary's actions led to the Church's subsequent policy of not allowing people of black African descent to hold the priesthood or participate in temple ordinances.

== Background ==
McCary was born as Warner McCary in Natchez, Mississippi, around 1810 or 1811 to an African American slave named Francis, or "Franky". Her master was a white carpenter from Pennsylvania named James McCary. She also had two older children, Kitty and Robert, who may have been James's biological children. Upon James McCary's death around 1813, his will emancipated Franky and the older children but declared Warner and his future offspring to "be held as slaves during all and each of their lives" in the service of his mother and siblings. In 1836, Warner escaped Natchez on a riverboat and went to New Orleans, where he worked at Leeds Foundry until 1840, as well as an occasional musician and cigar vendor. Around this time he married a white Mormon woman, Lucy Stanton Bassett, who claimed to be a Native American woman named Laah Ceil. She claimed her mother was Delaware Indian and father was Mohawk.

In his youth, McCary had begun using other names, including James Warner, William McCary, and Cary. He eventually adopted over a dozen aliases, many of which were Native American, including William Chubbee, William Chubbee King, Julius McCary, William McChubby, Okah Tubee, James Warner, and War'ne'wis Ke'ho'ke Chubbee.

Presenting himself as a Native American, McCary was helped in 1843 by local whites to get a permit as a free person of color in Mississippi. When he left in 1844, he toured various frontier and eastern cities as a musician and lecturer. During this time he briefly joined with Mormonism where he sparked racial controversy.

== Conversion to Mormonism ==
McCary arrived in Nauvoo, Illinois, in late 1845. He claimed he was a half-African American and half-Native American named Okah Tubbee and the "lost" son of Choctaw chief Mushulatubbee. McCary was also known as a skilled ventriloquist and musician. In Council Bluffs, Iowa, in February 1846, he was baptized into the Church of Jesus Christ of Latter-day Saints by apostle Orson Hyde, and he was probably ordained to the Melchizedek priesthood. Around this time, McCary also married Lucy Celesta Stanton, a white daughter of Daniel Stanton, a former high councilor and stake president. In the winter of 1846–1847, McCary joined the Latter Day Saints in Winter Quarters, Nebraska.

== Prophet and excommunication ==
While living in Cincinnati, McCary had claimed on various occasions to be Jesus and Adam, father of the human race. In 1847, as the Saints resided at Winter Quarters before continuing on to the Rocky Mountains, a seemingly penitent McCary had expressed to Brigham Young and members of the Quorum of the Twelve his anguish and confusion over his racial status, saying that he wished to be seen as "a common brother" despite being "a little shade darker," to which Brigham kindly reassured him: "We don't care about the color… It's nothing to do with blood, for of one blood has God made all flesh." President Young urged McCary to show genuine repentance before God, remarking that the Saints had but "to serve the Lord with all our hearts" and "repent [to] regain what we have lost."

Following this, the members of the Quorum of the Twelve—at Young's request—pooled together their private funds to assist McCary in securing a wagon and supplies to join the Saints in their westward trek. McCary, however, broke their trust and was promptly excommunicated. It was discovered that McCary had performed, within his own house, polygamous "sealings" that were clearly unauthorized. McCary had settled a short distance away from Winter Quarters and began attracting followers to his own brand of Mormonism. He instituted plural marriage among his followers, and had himself sealed to several white wives in a ceremony that consisted of sex with him and his first wife Lucy.

In the wake of McCary's scandal and excommunication, the members of the Twelve immediately distanced themselves from him while encouraging the Saints to do the same. McCary quickly left Winter Quarters and the surrounding settlements, fleeing to Missouri and eventually to Canada. Some residents of Cincinnati, Winter Quarters, and other townships had entertained McCary's teachings, including his promulgation of an "immediate consummation" sort of polygamous union, and upon whose adherents he was said to confer "priesthood blessings" using a "golden rod."

== Effect on policy of The Church of Jesus Christ of Latter-day Saints ==
McCary's behavior angered many of the Latter-Day Saints in Winter Quarters. Researchers have stated that his marriages to his white wives "played an important role in pushing the Mormon leadership into an anti-Black position" and may have prompted Brigham Young to institute the priesthood and temple ordinance ban on black people. A statement from Young to McCary in March 1847 suggested that up until that point, race had nothing to do with priesthood eligibility and the earliest known statement about blacks being restricted from the priesthood from any Mormon leader was made by apostle Parley P. Pratt a month after McCary was expelled from Winter Quarters. Speaking of McCary, Pratt stated that he "was a black man with the blood of Ham in him which linege was cursed as regards the priesthood".

After Brigham Young instigated the priesthood and temple ban in 1847, The Church of Jesus Christ of Latter-day Saints generally did not allow men of black African descent to hold the priesthood again until 1978.

== See also ==
- Black people and Mormonism
- Blacks and the Latter Day Saint movement
- Murder of Thomas Coleman
- Official Declaration—2
