= Timeline of changes to temple ceremonies in the LDS Church =

In the Church of Jesus Christ of Latter-day Saints (LDS Church)—Mormonism's largest denomination—there have been numerous changes to temple ceremonies in the church's over-200-year history. LDS Church temples are different from the publicly accessible meetinghouses designated for weekly services, but rather are places restricted only to members in good standing with a recommendation from their leaders. Temples are considered highly sacred by LDS adherents. In these temples, they perform rituals (termed ordinances), and are taught there that God has deemed temple ordinances as essential to achieving the theology's ultimate goal after death of exaltation (i.e. becoming like God). They are also instructed that a vast number of dead spirits exist in a condition termed spirit prison for whom (by proxy) when the temple ordinances are completed will have the option to accept these ordinances and be freed of their imprisonment. Temple ordinances are experienced by a living member of the Church for their own spiritual progression or vicariously ("by proxy") on behalf of a deceased individual.

Ordinances currently performed in LDS temples include:

- Baptism for the dead
- Confirmation on behalf of the dead
- Ordination to the Melchizedek priesthood on behalf of deceased men
- Washing and anointing (also known as the "Initiatory" ordinances)
- Endowment
- Sealing ordinances (for opposite-sex couples and any of their adopted or biological children) for time and all eternity
- Second anointing (also called the second endowment)

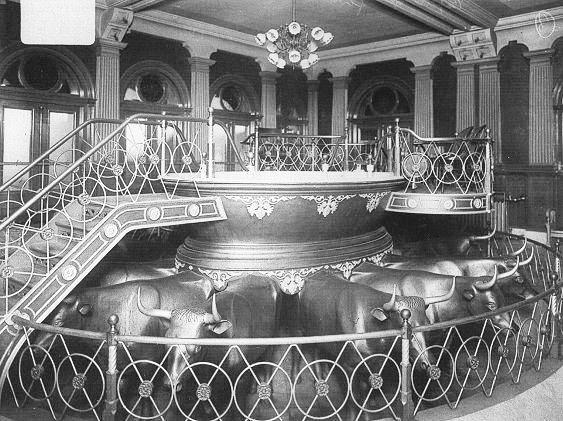
Baptismal font in the Salt Lake Temple c. 1912.

Previous rituals no longer performed in these temples include the following (ordered chronologically by year of discontinuation):

- Baptism for renewal of covenants (practiced 1842 to 1913)
- Baptism for health (practiced 1841 to 1922)
- Oath of vengeance (practiced 1845 to 1927)
- Penalties (practiced 1842 to 1990)
- Sealing ordinances for time only.

Below is a timeline of changes to these past and present LDS temple ordinances.

== Early 1800s ==
- 1831 – Smith "endowed" followers with power by ordaining them to the Melchizedek Priesthood.
- 1836 – By the mid-1830s, Smith was teaching that a further endowment was necessary, this time requiring the completion of the Kirtland Temple as a house of God where God could pour out his Holy Spirit. The Kirtland endowment included a ritual ceremony involving preparatory nude washings and anointings in a tub, followed by a gathering in the temple in which many reported spiritual gifts such as speaking in tongues and visions. Black church member Elijah Abel was allowed to participate in the Kirtland ceremonies, but no Black members participated in the Nauvoo temple ordinances during Smith's lifetime (1805–1844) or after, until the ban was lifted in 1978. Scholars disagree concerning whether Smith or his successor Young who formed the LDS Church introduced the Black temple ban.

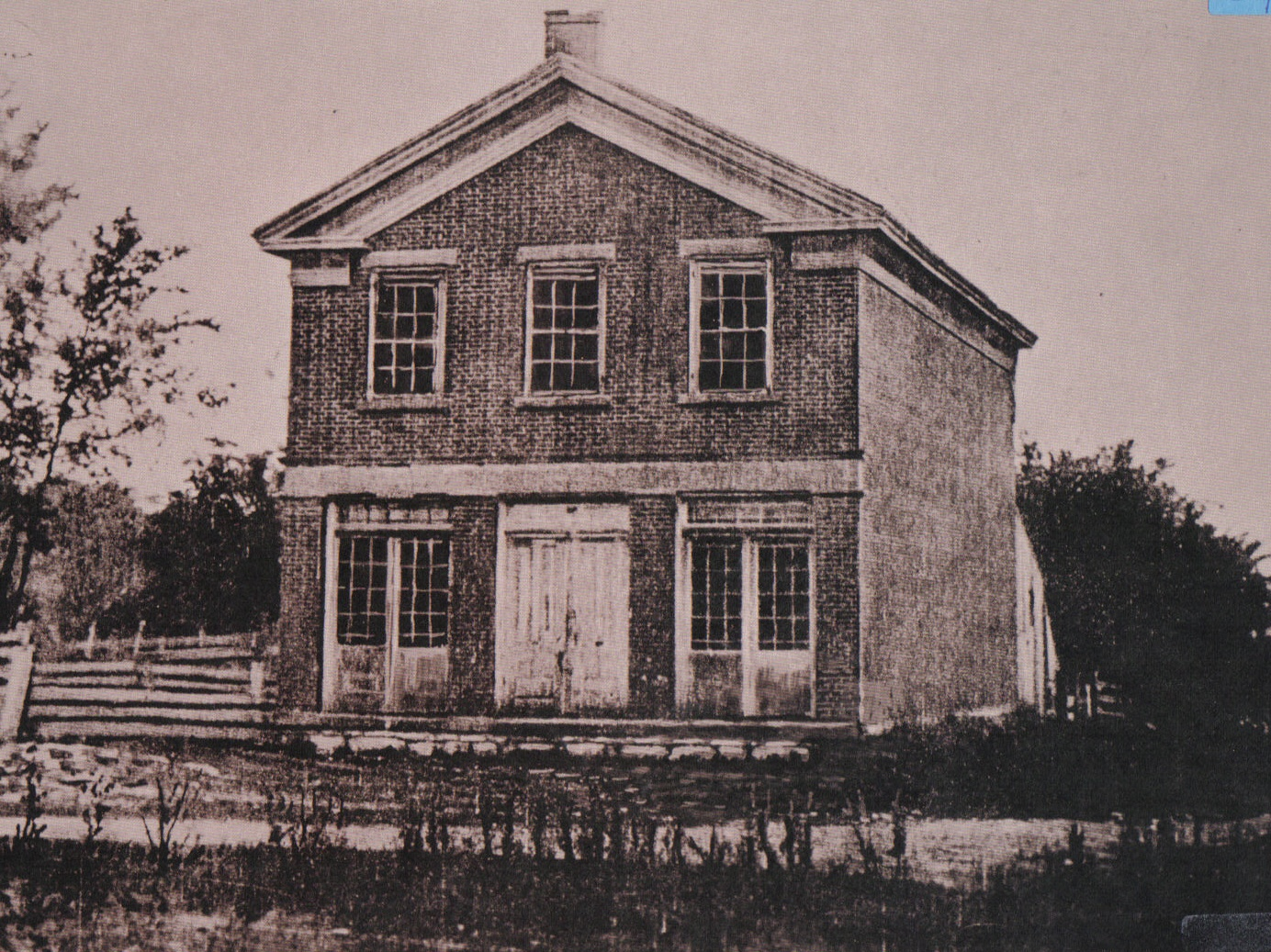
Original Red Brick Store c. 1840s where the first Nauvoo endowments were performed.

- 1840 – Baptisms for the dead began to be performed for the first time. They were initially performed outdoors in the Mississippi River.
- 1841 – The outdoor practice of baptisms for the dead was halted until a month later when they were first administered indoors in the Nauvoo Temple.
- 1842 – Joseph Smith prepared the second floor of his Red Brick Store, in Nauvoo, Illinois, to represent "the interior of a temple as circumstances would permit". The next day, May 4, he introduced the Nauvoo endowment ceremony to nine male associates. This close circle of adherents was expanded and later termed the Anointed Quorum. By the time of his death on June 27, 1844, it had more than 50 persons.
- 1843 – Women begin receiving the endowment. Per Wilford Woodruff, the endowment ceremony included a prayer for the Lord to take vengeance for all prophets in general who had been killed, which prayer was inspired by Revelation 6:9-10 (KJV).
- 1843 – Sealings were performed for the first time. Possibly even in 1842.
- 1843 – The second anointing was performed for the first time. The first recipients were Smith and one of his wives, Emma.

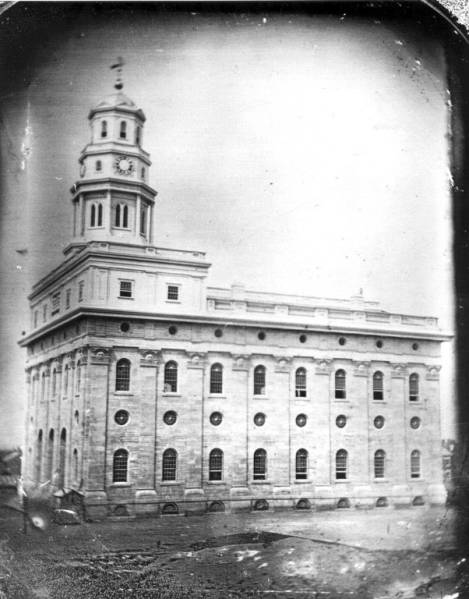
The Nauvoo Temple c. 1847

- 1845 – The Nauvoo endowment ceremony was introduced to the church at large in the Nauvoo Temple. A spacious hall in the temple's attic was arranged into appropriate ordinance "rooms" using canvas partitions. Potted plants were used in areas representing the Garden of Eden, and other areas were furnished appropriately, including a room representing the celestial kingdom. Over 5,500 persons received their endowments in this temple.

== Late 1800s ==
- 1852 – Between 1852 and 1978, most Black people were not permitted to participate in ordinances performed in the LDS Church temples, such as the endowment, celestial marriages, and family sealings. These ordinances are considered essential to enter the highest degree of heaven, so this meant that Black church members could not enjoy the full privileges enjoyed by other Latter-day Saints during the restriction. Non-Black spouses of Black people were also prohibited from entering temples. An exception to the temple ban for Black members was that (except for the complete temple ban period from the mid-1960s until the early 1970s under McKay) Black members had been allowed a limited use recommend to act as proxies in baptisms for the dead.

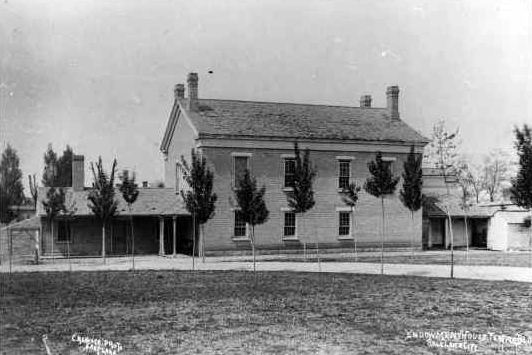
The Endowment House stood in Temple Square, Salt Lake City, Utah from 1855 to 1889.

- 1855 – The first building specifically designed for conducting temple rites with ordinance rooms was constructed and called the Endowment House.
- 1870s – Second anointings began to be performed vicariously for deceased members of the church.

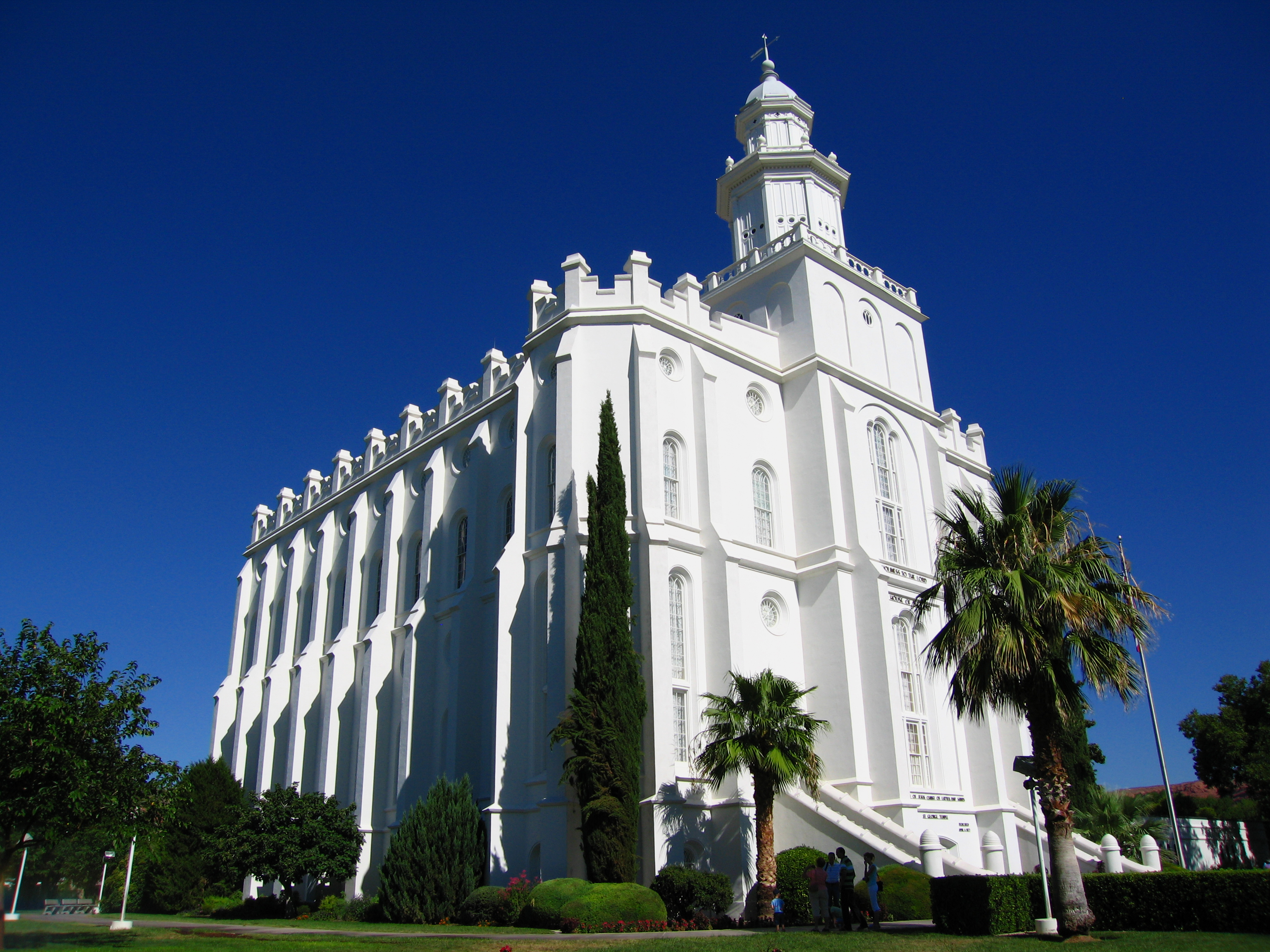
The St. George Temple

- 1877 – Shortly after the dedication of the St. George Temple, Young became concerned about the possibility of variations in the ceremony within the church's temples and so directed the majority of the text of the endowment to be written down. This document became the standard for the ceremony thereafter.
- 1877 – Young began including the Adam–God doctrine (the belief that Adam is God) in a new "lecture at the veil" during the endowment ceremony.
- 1877 – The first endowments for the dead were performed.
- 1893 – Minor alterations are made to the endowment ceremony.

== Early 1900s ==
- 1902 – The Adam–God doctrine was removed from the endowment ceremony.

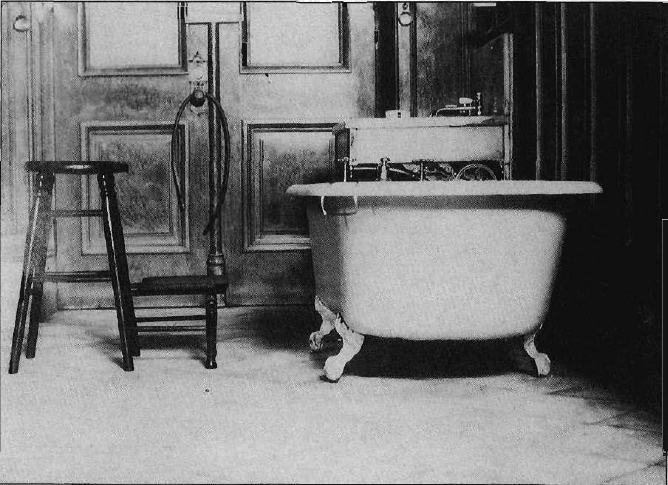
Full washing and anointing ceremonies in a bathtub like this one in the Salt Lake Temple were discontinued in the 1920s.

- 1920s – A shield begins to be used to partially cover the participants during parts of the washing and anointing previously involving nudity, and the actual washing in a bath tub was discontinued in favor of a symbolic washing while seated.
- 1921 – Abstinence from tobacco and from drinking coffee, tea, alcohol became a requirement for participation in temple ceremonies.
- 1922 – Church president Heber J. Grant discontinued the practice of baptisms for health in the church.

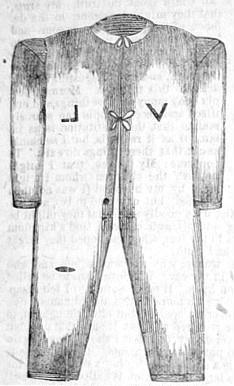
Before 1923, all temple garments had full-length sleeves and legs like the one depicted here.

- 1923 – While wrist- and ankle-length temple garments continued to be required for temple ceremonies, shorter garments that only went to the elbow and knees were approved for use outside the temple walls.
- 1927 – The oath of vengeance was removed from the endowment.
- 1936 – An explanation of the garment symbols is added to the endowment.
- 1945 – The endowment is administered in a language other than English for the first time.

== Late 1900s ==
- 1953 – The first film versions of the endowment ceremony were used. A scene with lava from the Disney movie "Fantasia" was used in part of the endowment presentation depicting the creation of the earth.
- Mid-1960s – David O. McKay instituted a complete ban on Black people participating in any temple ritual.
- 1960's – Live-action endowments are phased out in most temples in favor of film versions.
- 1960's – The preacher's Protestant hymn in the endowment is discontinued.
- Late 1960's – Wording was removed from the endowment ceremony describing Satan as having black skin.
- Early 1970s – The complete ban on Black people in temples ceremonies was partially lifted so they could once again participate in baptisms for the dead again.
- 1975 – The requirement for wrist and ankle length garments for in-temple use is removed.
- 1978 – The temple ban on Black people participating in most temple ceremonies was fully removed.

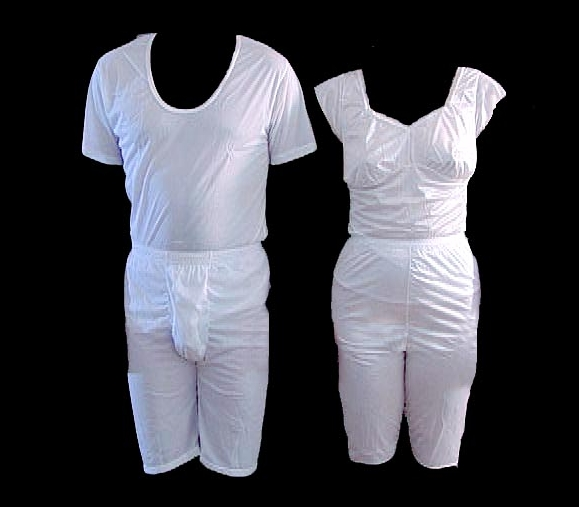
In 1979, two-piece temple garments like those shown here began to be permitted for recipients of the washing and anointing ceremony.

- 1979 – Two-piece temple garments began to be permitted for recipients of the washing and anointing ceremony.
- 1990 – The penalties and their oaths were removed from the endowment. The administration of the five points of fellowship at the veil is also removed. The recitation of the Adamic language phrase "Pay Lay Ale" is removed from the prayer circle at the altar. Women no longer covenant to obey their husbands. The preacher character is eliminated from the endowment ceremony. The lecture at the veil is discontinued. Wording faulting Eve for the Fall and God telling Eve that Adam "shall rule over thee" is removed.

== 2000s ==
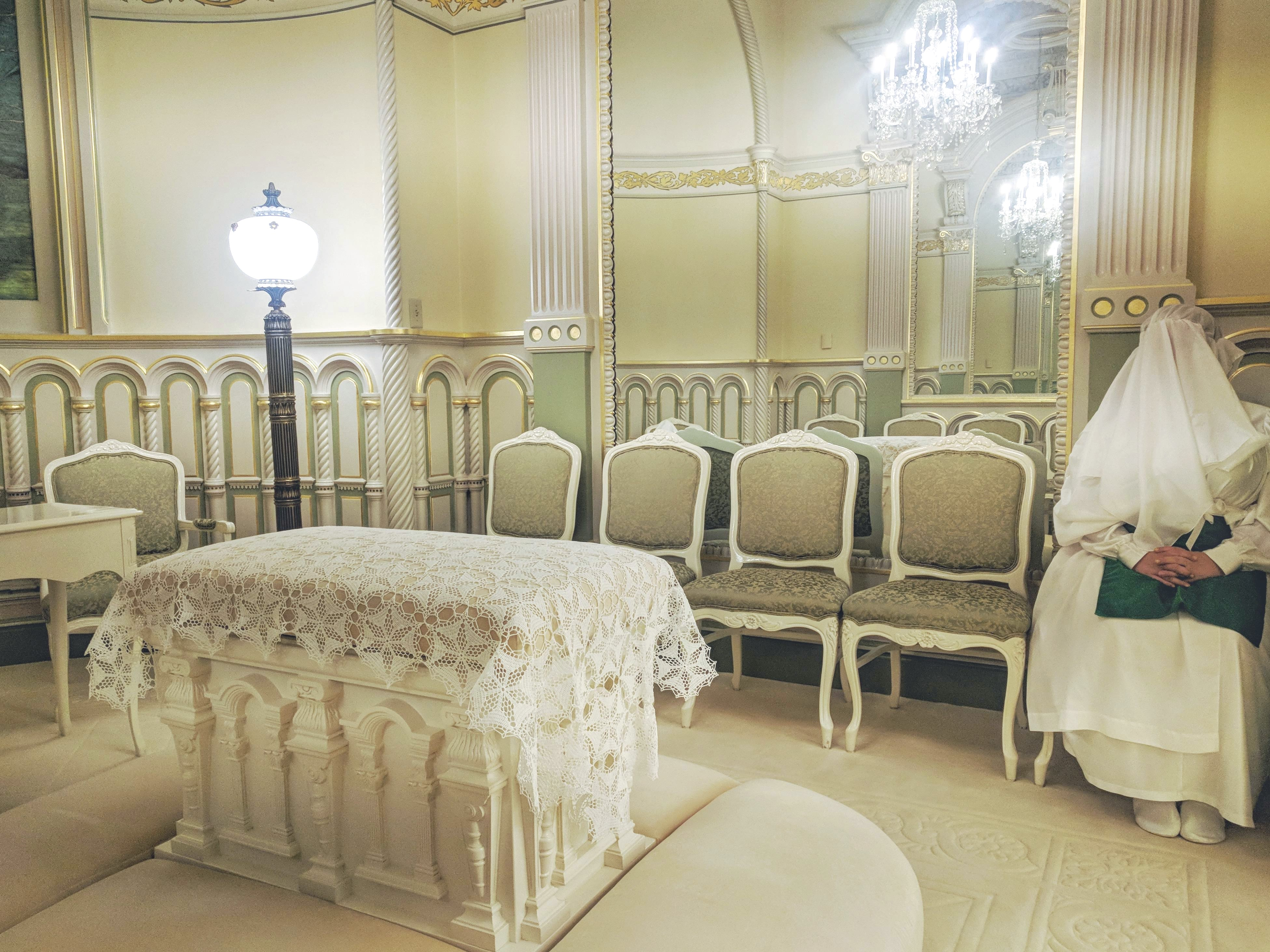
A woman in white and green ceremonial temple garb showing the veil positioning used at times in endowment ceremony before 2019.

- 2005 – The partially nude portions of the washing and anointing are ended as participants begin the ceremony already wearing the temple garments. The water and oil are applied only to the head instead of various parts of the body (e.g. the breast and loins).
- 2008 – Participants are no longer asked to stand while making covenants in the endowment.
- 2019 – Endowment wording where women were previously urged to be a priestess "unto her husband," while men were promised they will be priests to God was altered, and more lines were added for Eve. Additionally, women were no longer required to cover their faces with the veil during certain portions of the ceremony.
- 2020 – The temple clothing was modified by simplifying the design of the robe and veil, removing the tie for the cap and veil, removing the cap's plastic insert, and using a more durable fabric for the robe, cap, sash, and envelope.
- 2023 – The parts where participants each gave the token (a form of handshake) was removed such that the only touching happened at the end of the ceremony. Additionally, the ceremony now opens with a list of the five covenants that individuals will be making in the temple during the ceremony before asking if participants want to leave or remain. A ritual performance was added depicting the War in Heaven in the premortal life. The ordinance was streamlined with less clothing changes and sitting and standing. There is no longer a live witness couple at the altar. The warning to participants to avoid loud laughter and light-mindedness was removed.

== See also ==
- Mormonism and Freemasonry
- Timeline of LGBTQ Mormon history
- Timeline of teachings on evolution in the LDS Church
- Timeline of teachings on homosexuality in the LDS Church
