= Endowment House =

Latter-day Saint religious building

Coordinates: 40°46′16″N 111°53′37″W

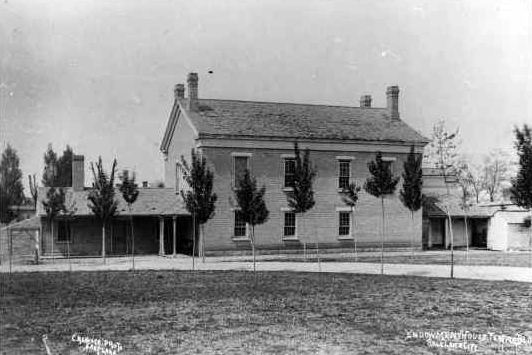
The Endowment House that stood on Temple Square, Salt Lake City, Utah.

The Endowment House was an early building used by the Church of Jesus Christ of Latter-day Saints (LDS Church) to administer temple ordinances in Salt Lake City, Utah Territory. From the construction of the Council House in 1852, Salt Lake City's first public building, until the construction of the Endowment House, the members of the LDS Church used the top floor of the Council House for administering temple ordinances. When this arrangement proved impractical, Brigham Young directed Truman O. Angell, architect of the Salt Lake Temple, to design a temporary temple. Completed in 1855, the building was dedicated by Heber C. Kimball and came to be called the Endowment House after the endowment ceremonies that were conducted inside it.

== Appearance ==
The Endowment House stood on the northwest corner of Temple Square. Initially, it was a two-story adobe building, 44 by 34 feet (13 by 10 m), with a single-story 20-foot (6.1 m) extension on its north side. In 1856, another extension was added on its south side and a baptistry on its west side.

Inside, the Endowment House was the first building designed specifically for administering temple ordinances. Earlier buildings used for such purposes—such as Joseph Smith’s Red Brick Store in Nauvoo; the Nauvoo Temple; and the Council House—only had temporary canvas partitions. The Endowment House had ordinance rooms later found in some temples: a creation room; a garden room; a world room; a celestial room; and sealing rooms. In 1856, William Ward painted the walls of the creation room to represent the Garden of Eden, the first such temple mural. It was one of the first buildings in Utah to have indoor bathrooms.

== Uses ==
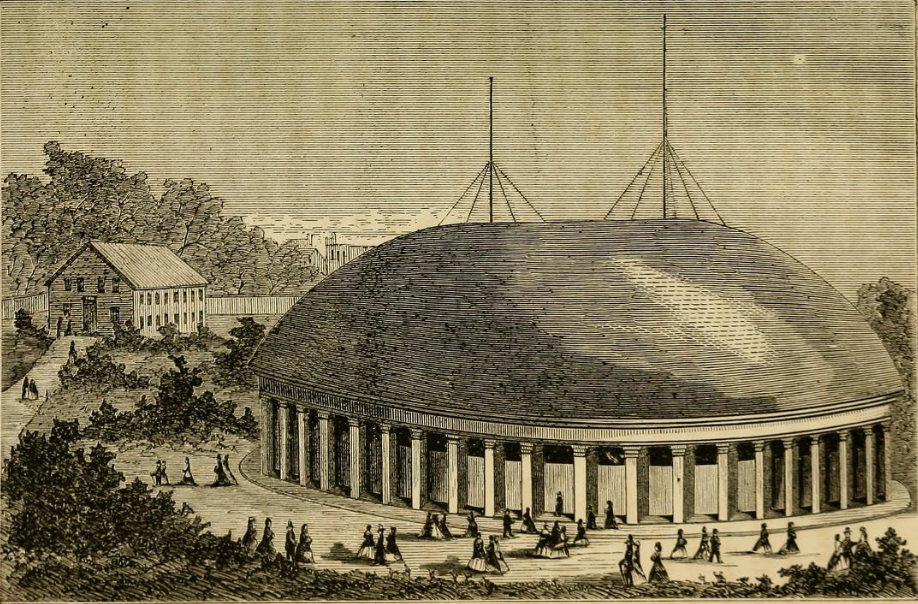
The Endowment House as situated on Temple Square ca 1870. The Endowment House is in the background on the left, behind the Tabernacle.

The Endowment House was used primarily for performing temple ordinances. From 1857 to 1876, the baptismal font was used to perform 134,053 baptisms for the dead. Between 1855 and 1884, 54,170 persons received their washings and anointings and endowments. Between 1855 and 1889, 68,767 couples were sealed in marriage—31,052 for the living and 37,715 for the dead.

LDS Church members did not consider the Endowment House a temple, and not all temple ordinances were performed there. Brigham Young explained, "We can, at the present time [1873], go into the Endowment House and be baptized for our dead, receive our washings and anointings, etc. ... We also have the privilege of sealing women to men without a Temple ... but when we come to other sealing ordinances, ordinances pertaining to ... sealing children to their parents, being sealed for our forefathers, etc., they cannot be done without a temple". Hence, there were no sealing of children nor endowments for the dead performed in the Endowment House. These ordinances were first administered in Utah's first temple, in St. George, in 1877.

The Endowment House was also used for other purposes, including prayer circles, settings apart, and instructing missionaries before their departure, as well as meetings of the various church leaders, such as the First Presidency and Quorum of the Twelve Apostles.

== Demolition ==
The Endowment House was demolished in November 1889 as a part of a plan to employ hundreds of Mormon migrant workers so that they could register to vote in Salt Lake City elections after Church authorities, led by Brigham Young Jr., ordered it razed.

However, the LDS Church has claimed since the 1890 Manifesto that the Endowment House was demolished in protest of a polygamous marriage performed there in 1889, supposedly without official sanction. Almost three years after the passage of the Edmunds–Tucker Act, in October 1889, Wilford Woodruff announced that he had not endorsed any new plural marriages inside the United States since April 6 of that year, when he became President of the Church. This statement was made in response to the September 26 arrest of a Mormon man who had married a plural wife in the Endowment House on April 8, 1889; Woodruff claimed not to know who had performed or endorsed the marriage, although he could easily have checked the records and likely he or Abraham H. Cannon endorsed it himself.

== Other Endowment Houses ==
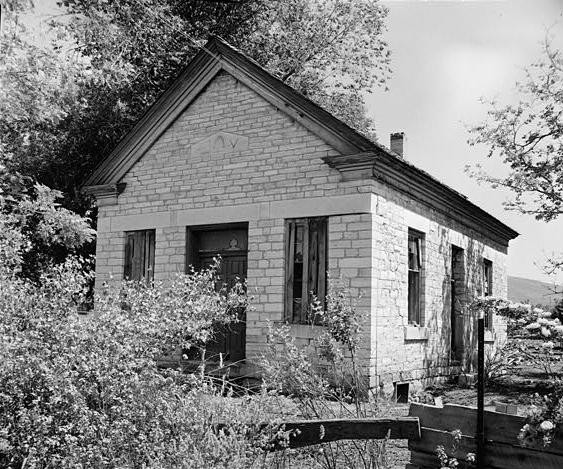
Building currently known as the "Endowment House", Spring City, Utah.

The Endowment House at Salt Lake City may not have been the only non-temple structure used for administering temple ordinances in Utah. One of these is a building known as the "Endowment House" in Spring City, Utah, built by Orson Hyde. The building is still standing at 63 West 300 South. Local records indicate that this building was a Relief Society hall. It is unclear whether it was ever used to administer temple ordinances.

== See also ==
- Adam-ondi-Ahman
- Council House (Salt Lake City)
- Holy of Holies (LDS Church)
- List of historic sites of The Church of Jesus Christ of Latter-day Saints
- Sacred Grove (Latter Day Saint movement)
- Temple (LDS Church)
