= Good Neighbor policy (LDS Church) =

Policy of the Church of Jesus Christ of Latter-day Saints

The Good Neighbor policy is the 1927 reform of the Church of Jesus Christ of Latter-day Saints (LDS Church) that removed any suggestion in church literature, sermons, and ordinances that its members should seek vengeance on US citizens or governments, particularly for the assassinations of its founder Joseph Smith and his brother, Hyrum.

The church gave no official name to this process, but after it was implemented, some Mormon-history commentators began referring to it as the church's "Good Neighbor" policy and took the name from US President Franklin Roosevelt's foreign policy, the Good Neighbor policy.

== Changes in temple ordinances ==
In 1919, shortly after he became the president of the LDS Church, Heber J. Grant appointed a committee to review the content of ordinances performed in LDS Church temples. The committee completed its work in 1927 and recommended to Grant that the oath of vengeance be removed from the temple endowment ceremony. The oath of vengeance required participants to agree to be bound by the following oath:

"You and each of you do covenant and promise that you will pray and never cease to pray to Almighty God to avenge the blood of the prophets upon this nation, and that you will teach the same to your children and to your children's children unto the third and fourth generation."

On February 15, 1927, apostle George F. Richards, acting on behalf of the First Presidency and Quorum of the Twelve Apostles, notified the presidents of the church's six temples that "all reference to retribution" was to be removed from the endowment ceremony and that the oath of vengeance was no longer to be administered. He also added that "all reference to avenging the blood of the Prophets" should be omitted from the prayer given in the temples' prayer circles.

== Changes in church literature ==
In 1927, the church also moved to change similar references in church literature. For example, since 1844, Latter-day Saints had sung the hymn "Praise to the Man" as a tribute to Joseph Smith. Part of the second stanza read, "Long shall his blood, which was shed by assassins, / Stain Illinois, while the earth lauds his fame" a reference to Joseph's murder by a mob in Carthage after the Illinois Governor reneged on his promise to provide Joseph protection. In its 1927 hymnal, the church substituted "Stain Illinois" with "Plead unto heav'n".
