= Prayer in Mormonism =

For members of the Church of Jesus Christ of Latter-day Saints (LDS Church), prayer is a means of communicating with God. Such communication is considered to be two-way, with the praying individual both expressing thoughts to God and receiving revelation, or communication from God, in return. As such, individuals who pray privately often include time to listen and ponder, during or after a prayer is uttered. Communication from God is received through the Holy Ghost, which speaks to the mind and heart of an individual. Prayer is one of the central teachings of the church, and adherents believe that they are commanded to pray often. The LDS Church teaches that humankind has been commanded to pray since its first generation. There are no restrictions as to who can pray, and the LDS Church teaches that all should pray and that God hears and listens to all prayers. Members are taught to begin to pray from a young age, and young children are sometimes asked to offer public prayers. Individuals who are not members of the LDS Church are also encouraged to pray both publicly and privately.

== Form ==
Partially because prayer is considered to be a conversation with God, personal prayers are not memorized, and "vain repetitions" are discouraged. Nonetheless, prayers do have a general form: they are addressed to God the Father and offered in the name of Jesus Christ. Members believe that God, whom they believe is their Heavenly Father, desires to bless them, and that Jesus Christ, whom they believe to be the only begotten son of God in the flesh, advocates before God on their behalf. Prayers are not offered to anyone other than God the Father.

The LDS Church teaches English speaking members to use "special language" when praying, including "the pronouns thee, thou, thy, and thine instead of you, your, and yours" to indicate respect; members are taught that "prayers should be simple, direct, and sincere" and that "our Heavenly Father, who loves all of his children, hears and answers all prayers, however phrased." Some members of the LDS Church have publicly expressed difficulty in accepting the use of antiquated pronouns.

Other than addressing God the Father, using specific preferred language for English speakers, and praying in the name of Jesus Christ, what is said during prayer depends on the individual's needs, wants, or desires. Prayers may be of any length in duration. Prayer is an opportunity to express gratitude for blessings received, to request additional blessings, to counsel with God, or to otherwise converse with God. It is tradition that prayers are concluded with the word "amen." Though frequently offered kneeling down with folded arms, Latter-day Saint prayers are not given facing in a particular direction and may be offered kneeling, sitting, or standing at any time of the day or night.

Members are taught to pray with faith and with real intent, which means to pray believing to receive and with the intention to act in accordance with any direction received from God through prayer. Though blessings are requested through prayer, prayer is to be an opportunity to align the individual's will with God's, not to seek to change God's will. Thus, prayers are often filled with questions, and praying members frequently use prayer to seek to know what blessings God would have them request. Believing that God knows all and makes his will known to individuals, members use prayer to counsel with God about life decisions.

== Use ==
Prayers are offered privately, in families, and in public. Private prayers can be expressed both vocally or silently through thoughts. Individuals are commanded to pray always, directing their thoughts to God, and personal prayers are frequently offered in the morning, before meals, and at night. Latter-day Saints are promised that if they pray righteously before activities, such activities will be for their benefit.

Group prayers, whether in the family or in public, are offered vocally. One individual is selected as the voice of the prayer. There are no restrictions or traditions as to who should pray, and even small children are selected to pray in family and other group settings. The individual selected as voice offers the prayer on behalf of all present, and others in the group say "amen" at the conclusion of the prayer, which signifies "That is my prayer too."

Families typically offer prayers together before family meals, in the morning, at night, and to start or end family events, such as family home evenings. Families are also encouraged to pray together to seek answers to questions or other divine counsel. In these scenarios, those participating in the prayer will each listen for an answer from God and then discuss with the rest of the family.

Outside the family, public prayers are offered at the beginning and end of virtually all Church functions or gatherings of Church members. For example, prayers are offered at the beginning and/or end of sacrament meetings, leadership meetings, trainings, conferences, and Sunday School. Outside of official Church functions, prayers are frequently offered at barbecues, service activities, camp-outs, or any other event at which members gather.

== Prayer in Latter-day Saint teachings ==
The LDS Church teaches that prayer is listened to and answered by God and that God commands that his children pray to him. It teaches prayer can provide inspiration, revelation, healing, wisdom and understanding, hope, charity, discernment, strength to resist temptation, forgiveness from sins, compassion, solace from grief, peace, and abilities beyond normal capacities.

The Bible, the Book of Mormon, the Doctrine and Covenants, and the Pearl of Great Price all teach the importance of prayer and how to pray to God. The Book of Mormon encourages believers to "cry unto him for mercy; for he is mighty to save .... Cry unto him over the crops of your fields, that ye may prosper in them" and that "your hearts be full, drawn out in prayer unto him continually for your welfare, and also for the welfare of those who are around you." The Book of Mormon teaches that faithful prayer always includes living as one has prayed by serving and helping others, so that the prayer is not in vain or hypocritical. Alma also teaches, "Counsel with the Lord in all thy doings, and he will direct thee for good; ... let thy heart be full of thanks unto God; and if ye do these things, ye shall be lifted up at the last day."

== Prayer circles ==
As part of the LDS Church's temple endowment ceremony, participants conduct a prayer circle, which Joseph Smith called the "true order of prayer". The ritual involves one person offering a prayer while surrounded by a circle of participants. The members of the circle repeat the words of the prayer. Until 1978, prayer circles were also performed outside of temples.

== See also ==
- First Vision
- Prayer circle (Mormonism)
- Revelation (Latter Day Saints)#Personal revelation
