= Penalty (Mormonism) =

Punishments for breaking temple oath of secrecy

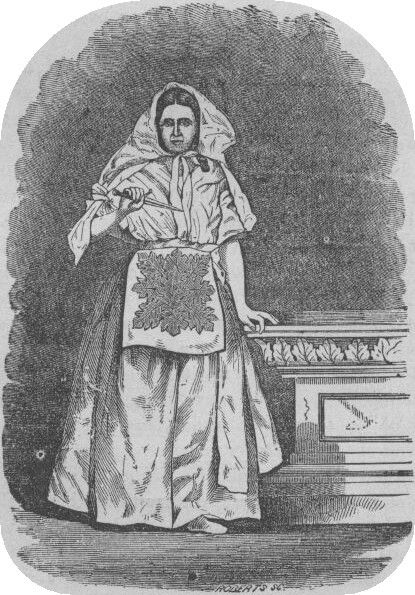
Woman in temple clothing c. 1870s, depicted with a knife symbolically referenced in the penalty to allow ones body to "be cut asunder and all your bowels gush out."

In Mormonism, a penalty is a specified punishment for breaking an oath of secrecy after receiving the Nauvoo endowment ceremony. Adherents agreed they might be submitted to execution in specific ways should they reveal certain phrases and gestures from the ceremony called tokens (handshakes), names (verbal passwords), signs (gestures), and penalties (motion gestures of execution). In the penalty portion of the ceremony participants each symbolically enacted three of the methods of their execution: throat slitting, heart removal, and disembowelment. These penalties were first instituted by Joseph Smith in 1842, and further developed by Brigham Young after Smith's death. The penalties were similar to oaths made as part of a particular rite of Freemasonry practiced in western New York at the time the endowment was developed. During the 20th century, the largest Mormon denomination, the Church of Jesus Christ of Latter-day Saints (LDS Church), gradually softened the graphic nature of their penalties, and in 1990, removed them altogether from its version of the ceremony. Other fundamentalist Mormon denominations continue to have the penalties as part of their temple oaths.

== Original oaths ==
On May 4, 1842, Joseph Smith instituted the endowment ritual in his Red Brick Store in Nauvoo, Illinois to some of his closest circle of adherents later termed the Anointed Quorum. At three different stages of the endowment, participants were asked to take an oath of secrecy regarding the ceremony.

=== Oaths ===
The following oaths were made while promising not to reveal each token's name, sign, or penalty:

1. Throat: "Should I do so [reveal any of the secrets], I agree that my throat may be cut from ear to ear, and my tongue torn out by its roots."
2. Heart: "Should we do so, we agree that our breasts may be torn open, our hearts and vitals torn out and given to the birds of the air and the beasts of the field."
3. Bowels: "Should you do so, you agree that your body may be cut asunder and all your bowels gush out."

=== Enactment ===
Artist's depiction of the gestures associated with each penalty which simulate the slitting of the throat (left-most image), heart, and bowels with the participant's hand representing a knife

Each of the described penalties was accompanied by gestures known as the "execution of the penalty" which had the oath taker simulate the actions described in the oath.

1. Throat: The participant placed his or her right hand palm-down with the thumb extended and the tip of the thumb just under the left ear. The gesture was made by drawing the tip of the thumb swiftly across the throat until the thumb was just under the right ear then dropping the hand and arm quickly to the side of the participant's body.
2. Heart: The participant placed his or her hand in a cup form over the left breast. The gesture was made by pulling the hand swiftly across the breast then quickly dropping the hand and arm to the side of the participant's body.
3. Bowels: The participant placed his or her right hand palm-down with the thumb extended and the tip of the thumb on the left of the torso just above the left hip. The gesture was made by drawing the thumb swiftly across the stomach until the thumb was just above the right hip and the hand and arm were quickly dropped to the side of the participant's body.

=== Similar Masonic oaths ===
The oaths and their accompanying gestures resembled certain oaths performed in a particular Freemasonry tradition in western New York at the time, in which participants promised:

1. Oath of an "Entered Apprentice Mason" (Throat): "I will … never reveal any part or parts, art or arts, point or points of the secret arts and mysteries of ancient Freemasonry. . . binding myself under no less penalty than to have my throat cut across, my tongue torn out by the roots" "This is given by drawing your right hand across your throat, the thumb next to your throat."
2. Oath of a "Fellow Craft Mason" (Heart): "I … most solemnly and sincerely promise and swear, that I will not give the degree of a Fellow Craft Mason to anyone of an inferior degree nor to any other being in the known world … binding myself under no less penalty than to have my left breast torn open and my heart and vitals taken from thence … to become a prey to the wild beasts of the field and vulture of the air". "The sign is given by drawing your right hand-flat with the palm of it next to your breast across your breast from the left to the right side with some quickness and dropping it down by your side."
3. Oath of a "Master Mason" (Bowels): "I … most solemnly and sincerely promise and swear in addition to my former obligations that I will not give the degree of a Master Mason to any of an inferior degree nor to any other being in the known world … binding myself under no less penalty than to have my body severed in two in the midst and divided to the north and south, my bowels burnt to ashes". "The Penal Sign is given by putting the right hand to the left side of the bowels, the hand open with the thumb next to the belly and drawing it across the belly and letting it fall; this is done tolerably quick. This alludes to the penalty of the obligation: 'Having my body severed in twain,' etc.".

== Modifications and removal ==
Beginning in 1919, LDS Church president Heber J. Grant appointed a committee charged with revising the endowment ceremony which was done under the direction of apostle George F. Richards from 1921 to 1927. Among the changes instituted was a modification of the oaths. While the gestures remained unchanged, the church removed the explicit descriptions of the three methods of execution and replaced them with the phrase, "rather than do so, I would suffer my life to be taken." In April 1990, the LDS Church eliminated the oaths and the gestures from the endowment.

== Confusion with other practices ==
These penalty oaths and the oath of vengeance are often confused. The oath of vengeance—a promise to pray for justice for the murders of Joseph Smith and his brother Hyrum—was removed from the endowment in 1927 as part of the church's "Good Neighbor" policy, and the penalty oaths were removed in 1990. The penalty oaths are also frequently confused with the concept of blood atonement.

== Continued practice by Mormon fundamentalists ==
Some groups within the Mormon fundamentalist movement continue to practice the endowment without modification. These groups still participate in these oaths when performing the endowment. Some of the denominations that continue to perform the original endowment include the Fundamentalist Church of Jesus Christ of Latter-Day Saints, the Apostolic United Brethren, and the True and Living Church of Jesus Christ of Saints of the Last Days.

== Depictions and discussion ==
Numerous individuals and works have referenced the temple penalties and their manner of execution. The 2022 Hulu series Under the Banner of Heaven (set in the 1980s) depicted the throat-slicing gesture of the pre-1990 LDS endowment ceremony. Author and former Brigham Young University professor Brian Evenson wrote a depiction of the penalties in a novel, and stated "any book that spoke in any detail about the relationship of Mormon culture to violence needed to acknowledge the connection of the temple ceremony to violence." In her autobiographical Secret Ceremonies, the American journalist Deborah Laake discusses the temple penalties.

Writer J. Aaron Sanders stated that the temple penalties were a form of blood atonement. Author Peter Levenda linked Smith's introduction of the Masonic blood oaths into the temple endowment as a step towards later threats of blood atonement for other perceived crimes in Utah territory. Wallace Stegner wrote “It would be bad history to pretend that there were no holy murders in Utah and ... no mysterious disappearances of apostates". Historian Juanita Brooks stated that violent enforcement of religious oaths was a "literal and terrible reality" advocated by Brigham Young "without compromise".

In March 1857, church elder William R. Parrish decided to leave Utah with his family when he "grew cold in the faith" and had his throat slit near his Springville, Utah home.

== See also ==
- Mormonism and violence
- Criticism of Mormonism
