= Council of Friends =

Type of advisory organization described by Joseph Smith

The Council of Friends was an organization described by Joseph Smith in early 19th-century Mormon theology. He viewed the organisation as being part of a world government which would guide and direct the Kingdom of God (Zion) on earth during the end times as a theodemocracy.

== Vision ==
Smith envisioned this council as serving in an advisory capacity to both the Priesthood authorities of his church and a Council of Fifty. This group of three organizations was expected to rule as a world government just prior to the Millennium. As advisers, the Council of Friends would serve as the base of the governing body, but possessed no real political power. Although claims to priesthood authority preceded the official organization of Smith's church in 1830, and a Council of Fifty was organized on March 11, 1844, no Council of Friends was ever organized by Smith.

== Mormon fundamentalism ==
The concept of a Council of Friends or Priesthood Council is central to the Mormon fundamentalist theology developed by Lorin C. Woolley and others in the late 1920s, wherein it was said to consist of seven "High Priest Apostles" holding higher authority than the Quorum of the Twelve of the Church of Jesus Christ of Latter-day Saints (LDS Church). Early fundamentalists believed that the council had been restored in secret by Joseph Smith before the LDS Church itself, and dated back to the time of Adam. Various Mormon fundamentalist leaders were said to have been members of the Council at one time. When fully organized, Woolley taught that the Council would function as the presidency of a larger, seventy-one member Sanhedrin.

The authority of the Council of Friends pertained to the Priesthood and not to the church, early Mormon fundamentalists. Most members of the original members of the Council of Friends had been excommunicated from the LDS Church. They felt that its existence gave them the right to continue solemnizing plural marriages even after LDS Church President Wilford Woodruff's 1890 Manifesto discountenancing the practice.

== See also ==
- Anointed Quorum
