= Endowment (Mormonism) =

Temple ceremony in Mormonism

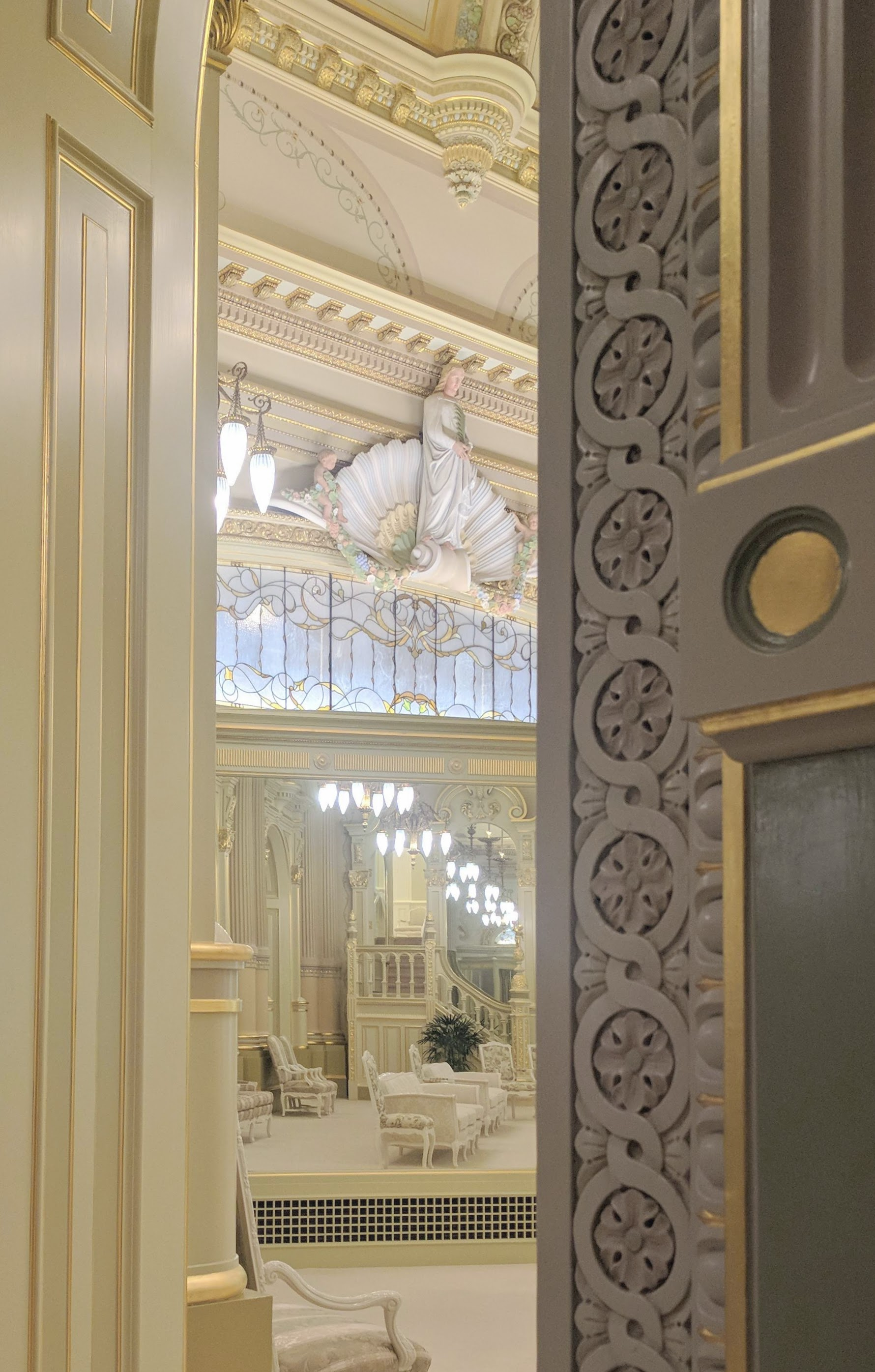
The celestial room in temples like the Salt Lake Temple shown here represents the highest level of heaven in LDS theology, and is reached after passing the testing portion of the endowment ceremony.

In Mormonism, the endowment usually refers to the first endowment, which is a two-part ordinance (ceremony) designed for participants to become kings, queens, priests, and priestesses in the afterlife. In the first part, participants take part in a scripted reenactment of the Biblical creation and fall of Adam and Eve. The ceremony includes a symbolic washing and anointing, and receipt of a "new name" which they are not to reveal to others except at a certain part in the ceremony, and the receipt of the temple garment, which Mormons then are expected to wear under their clothing day and night throughout their life. In the second part, participants are taught symbolic gestures and passwords considered necessary to pass by angels guarding the way to heaven, and are instructed not to reveal them to others. As practiced today in the Church of Jesus Christ of Latter-day Saints (LDS Church), the endowment also consists of a series of covenants (promises to God) that participants make, such as a covenant of consecration to the LDS Church. All LDS Church members who choose to serve as missionaries or participate in a celestial marriage in a temple must first complete the first endowment ceremony.

The other, and much less common, endowment (usually called the second anointing or second endowment), is considered the pinnacle ordinance of the temple, and is jointly given to a husband and wife couple to ensure salvation, guarantee exaltation, and confer godhood. Recipients of the second anointing are anointed as kings, queens, priests, and priestesses, whereas in the first endowment they are only anointed to become those in the future as long as they follow specified covenants. The second anointing is only given to a select group, and its existence is not widely known among the general membership.

The endowment as practiced today was instituted by founder Joseph Smith in the 1840s with further contributions by Brigham Young and his successors. The ceremony is performed in Latter Day Saint temples, which are dedicated specifically for the endowment and certain other ordinances sacred to Mormons, and are open only to Mormons who meet certain requirements. There was a brief period during the construction of the Salt Lake Temple where a small building referred to as the Endowment House was used to administer the endowment ordinance. The endowment is currently practiced by the LDS Church and several denominations of Mormon fundamentalism. The LDS Church has altered the ceremony throughout its history.

A distinct endowment ceremony was also performed in the 1830s in the Kirtland Temple, the first temple of the broader Latter Day Saint movement, which includes other smaller churches such as the Community of Christ. The term "endowment" thus has various meanings presently, historically, and within other branches of the Latter Day Saint movement.

In the LDS Church, about two-thirds of US members reported having current authorization from their local leadership to participate in temple ordinances in a 2012 survey. Estimates show that fewer than half of converts to the LDS Church ultimately undergo the first endowment ceremony, and young people preparing for missions account for about one-third of "live" endowments (as contrasted with proxy endowments for the deceased). The less common second endowment had been administered 15,000 times by 1941, but has become less frequent in modern times.

== Previous Latter Day Saint endowments ==
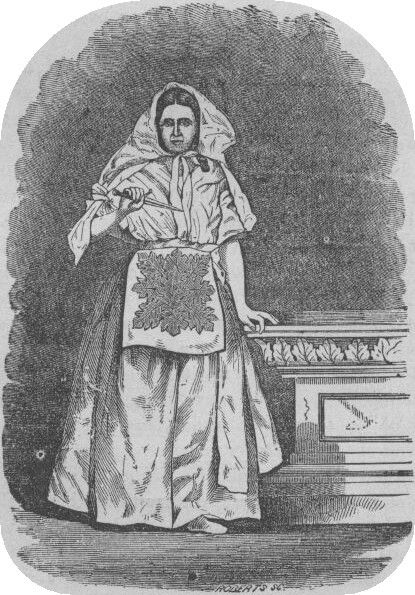
Woman's endowment clothing circa the 1870s, from an illustration in Mark Twain's Roughing It.

The meaning and scope of the term endowment evolved during the early Latter Day Saint movement, of which Mormonism is a part. The term derives from the Authorized King James Version, referring to the spiritual gifts given the disciples of Jesus on the day of Pentecost, in which they were "endowed with power from on high," Christians generally understand this endowment to refer to the gift of the Holy Spirit, which the Latter Day Saints believe is given at the Confirmation ceremony. In 1831, however, Smith began teaching that the elders of the church needed to be further "endowed with power from on high" in order to be effective proselytizers. He therefore gathered the elders together at a general conference in June 1831 and "endowed" them with this power by ordaining them to the High Priesthood. (Note: Smith said God would call the elders of the church together in Kirtland in a general conference and "pour out [his] Spirit upon them in that day they assemble themselves together". Smith told one adherent that "at the conference meeting he [would] be ordained unto power from on high". Elders at the conference were ordained for the first time to the high priesthood, and the official church history states that during this conference, "the authority of the Melchizedek priesthood was manifested and conferred for the first time upon several of the Elders". The editor of this history believed this was a mistake, because it would not be consistent with the then-common Mormon belief that the priesthood had been conferred prior to the church's founding in 1830. Ordination "consisted [of] the endowment—it being a new order—and bestowed authority". Many of the Saints "have been ordained to the High Priesthood, or the order of Melchizedek; and profess to be endowed with the same power as the ancient apostles were".)

By the mid-1830s, Smith was teaching that a further endowment was necessary, this time requiring the completion of the Kirtland Temple as a house of God where God could pour out his Holy Spirit. (Note: Sources identifying the location of the temple in Kirtland. Stating in this building the Lord "design[ed] to endow those [he] had chosen with power on high". Referring to the Kirtland endowment as a "greater endowment".) Upon the completion of the Kirtland Temple after three years of construction (1833–1836), the elders of the church gathered for this second promised endowment in early 1836. The Kirtland endowment included a ritual ceremony involving preparatory washings and anointings with oil, followed by a gathering in the temple in which many reported spiritual gifts such as speaking in tongues and visions.

=== The Nauvoo endowment ===
==== Overview ====
The Nauvoo endowment consists of two phases: (1) an initiation, and (2) an instructional and testing phase. The initiation consists of a washing and anointing, culminating in the clothing of the patron in a "Garment of the Holy Priesthood", which is thereafter worn as an undergarment.

The instructional and testing phase of the endowment consists of a scripted reenactment of Adam and Eve's experience in the Garden of Eden (performed by live actors—called officiators; in the mid-20th century certain portions were adapted to a film presentation). The instruction is punctuated with oaths, symbolic gestures, and a prayer around an altar, and at the end of instruction, the initiate's knowledge of symbolic gestures and key-words is tested at a "veil."

==== Introduction ====
On May 3, 1842, Joseph Smith prepared the second floor of his Red Brick Store, in Nauvoo, Illinois, to represent "the interior of a temple as circumstances would permit". The next day, May 4, he introduced the Nauvoo endowment ceremony to nine associates. (Note: These nine were: Associate President and Patriarch to the Church Hyrum (Joseph Smith's brother); first counselor in the First Presidency, William Law; three of the twelve apostles, Brigham Young, Heber C. Kimball and Willard Richards; Nauvoo stake president, William Marks; two bishops, Newel K. Whitney and George Miller; and a close friend, Judge James Adams of Springfield, Illinois.) (Note: Concerning the day's activities, Smith recorded: "[T]he communications I made to this council were of things spiritual, and to be received only by the spiritual minded: and there was nothing made known to these men but what will be made known to all the Saints of the last days, so soon as they are prepared to receive, and a proper place is prepared to communicate them, even to the weakest of Saints: therefore let the Saints be diligent in building the Temple.")

Throughout 1843 and 1844 Smith continued to initiate other men, as well as women, into the endowment ceremony. By the time of his death on June 27, 1844, more than 50 persons had been admitted into the Anointed Quorum, the name by which this group called themselves.

==== The Nauvoo endowment and Freemasonry ====
There are many similarities between Smith's endowment ceremony and certain rituals of Freemasonry, particularly the Royal Arch degree. These specific similarities included instruction in various signs, tokens, and passwords, and the imposition of various forms of the penalties for revealing them. The original wording of the penalties, for example, closely followed the graphic wording of the Masonic penalties.

According to the predominant view by historians, Smith used and adapted material from the Masonic rituals in creating the endowment ceremony. All of those first initiated by Smith on May 4, 1842, were longstanding or recent Masons: James Adams was the Deputy Grand Master of the Masonic Grand Lodge of Illinois; Newell K. Whitney, George Miller and Heber C. Kimball had previously been Lodge Masters; Smith's brother, Hyrum, had been a Mason since 1827; and the remaining five participants (Law, Marks, Young, Richards, and Smith himself) had been initiated as Freemasons just weeks before the meeting. However, none of these Masons ever charged Smith with breaking any of Masonry's oaths or revealing its secrets. In contrast to those that believe Smith simply copied these rituals to advance his own religion, one Mormon historian has noted that these Masonic parallels confirmed to these men "the breath of the restoration impulse and was evidence of Smith's divine calling".

The LDS Church has never commented officially on these similarities, although certain features of the two rituals have been called "analogous" by one official Church Historian and the apostle Jeffrey R. Holland stated in a BBC interview that endowment ordinance vows to secrecy are "similar to a Masonic relationship." (Note: LDS Church general authority and historian B. H. Roberts stated that the Masonic ritual was "analogous, perhaps, in some of its features" to the obligations and covenants of the Endowment.) The LDS Church apostle John A. Widtsoe downplayed the similarities, arguing that they "do not deal with the basic matters [the endowment] but rather with the mechanism of the ritual." One LDS Church educator, however, was censured in the 1970s by the Church Educational System for arguing that the endowment ceremony had a dependent relationship with the rituals of freemasonry.

Some within the LDS Church, particularly Smith's contemporaries, have expressed the view that the endowment was given anciently by God in its original form at the Temple of Solomon, but that the form of the ritual degenerated into the form used by Freemasons. Heber C. Kimball clearly supported this position: "We have the true Masonry. The Masonry of today is received from the apostasy which took place in the days of Solomon and David. They have now and then a thing that is correct, but we have the real thing."

=== Later modifications by the LDS Church ===
After Smith officiated in Brigham Young's endowment in 1842 Smith told him, "Brother Brigham, this is not arranged perfectly; however we have done the best we could under the circumstances in which we are placed. I wish you to take this matter in hand: organize and systematize all these ceremonies". Young did as Smith directed, and under Young's direction the Nauvoo endowment ceremony was introduced to the church at large in the Nauvoo Temple during the winter of 1845–1846. A spacious hall in the temple's attic was arranged into appropriate ordinance "rooms" using canvas partitions. Potted plants were used in areas representing the Garden of Eden, and other areas were furnished appropriately, including a room representing the celestial kingdom. Over 5,500 persons received their endowments in this temple.

Young introduced the same ceremony in the Utah Territory in the 1850s, first in the Endowment House and then in the St. George Temple. During this period the ceremony had never been written down, but was passed orally from temple worker to worker. Shortly after the dedication of the St. George Temple, and before his death in 1877, Young became concerned about the possibility of variations in the ceremony within the church's temples and so directed the majority of the text of the endowment to be written down. This document became the standard for the ceremony thereafter. Also in 1877, the first endowments for the dead were performed in the St. George Temple.

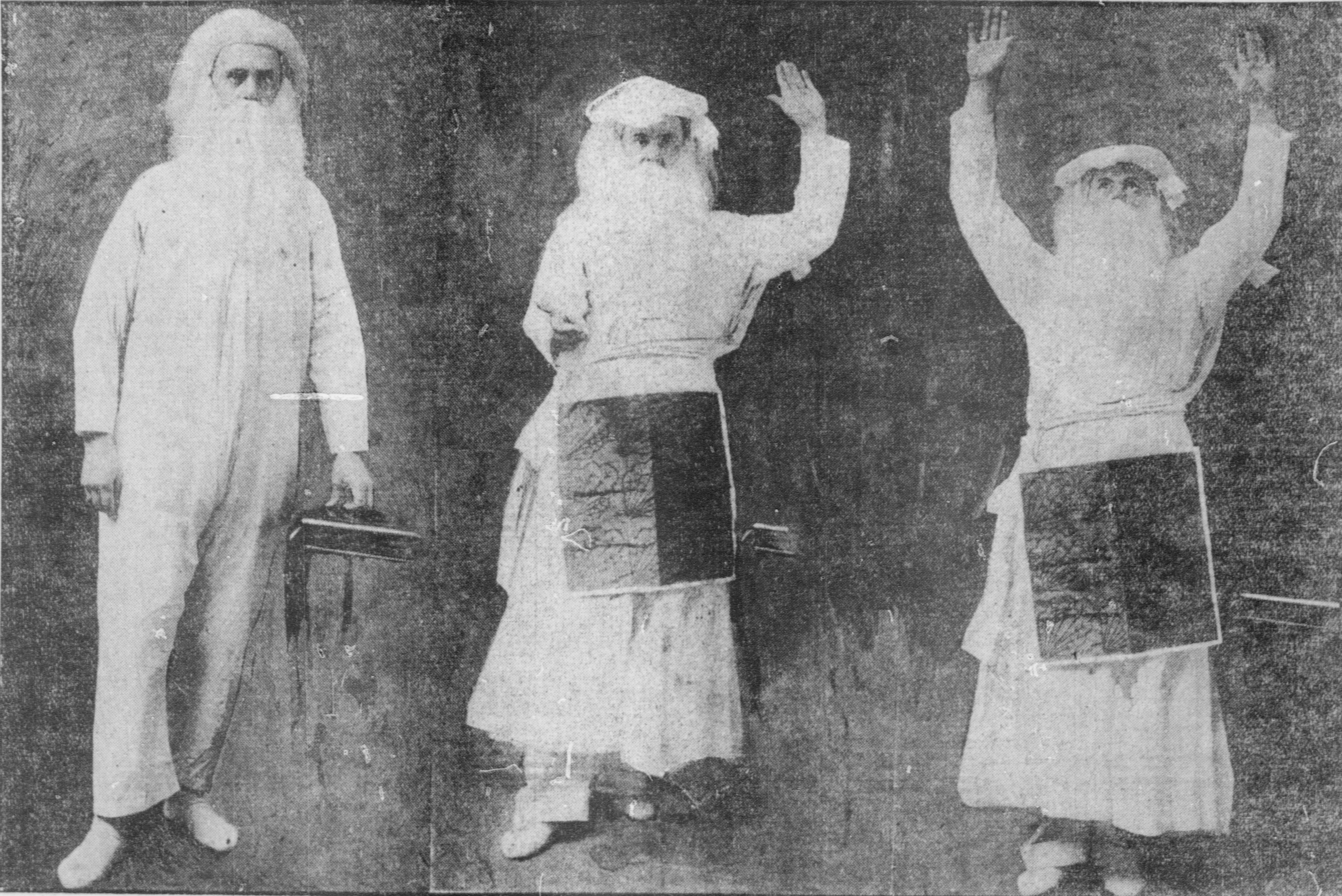
Public exposure of the endowment due to the 1904–1907 US Reed Smoot hearings include this photo from a Washington, D.C. newspaper depicting a man in temple clothing performing some of the ceremony's ritual arm and hand motions called "signs".

In 1893, minor alterations in the text were made in an attempt to bring uniformity to the ceremony as administered in the temples. Between 1904 and 1906, the temple ceremony received very public scrutiny during the 1904 Senate investigation of LDS Apostle and U.S. Senator, Reed Smoot. Of particular concern to senators was the ceremony's "law of vengeance", in which, during the hearings, it was revealed that participants took an oath of vengeance to pray that God would "avenge the blood of the prophets on this nation". The "prophets" were Joseph and Hyrum Smith, and "this nation" was the United States.

Beginning in 1919, church president Heber J. Grant appointed a committee charged with revising the ceremony, which was done under the direction of Apostle George F. Richards from 1921 to 1927. Richards received permission to write down the previously unwritten portions of the ceremony. Among his revisions was the elimination of the "law of vengeance". Previous versions of the ceremony into the 1880s also had the representative of the Lord cut the symbols in the garments with a knife through the veil, with one source suggesting an early version cut into the knee of the participant to create a scar. The committee also removed the violent language from the penalty portions of the ceremony. Prior to 1927, participants made an oath that if they ever revealed the secret gestures of the ceremony, they would be subject to the following:

my throat [...] be cut from ear to ear, and my tongue torn out by its roots
our breasts [...] be torn open, our hearts and vitals torn out and given to the birds of the air and the beasts of the field
your body [...] be cut asunder and all your bowels gush out.
[changed to] different ways in which life may be taken.

Each temple president received a "President's Book" with the revised ceremony ensuring uniformity throughout the church's temples.

The first filmed versions of the endowment were introduced in the 1950s, by a committee headed by Gordon B. Hinckley. That change was initiated by church president David O. McKay as a way of providing the instruction simultaneously in different languages, an innovation made necessary by the construction of the Bern Switzerland Temple, the church's first temple in Europe. As of 2005, ceremonies in all but two (Salt Lake Temple and Manti Temple) of the church's 128 operating temples are presented using the filmed version.

In 1990, further changes included the elimination of all blood oaths and penalties. These penalties, representing what the member would rather suffer than reveal the signs given them in the ceremony, were symbolized by gestures for having the throat cut, the breast cut open, and the bowels torn out. Changes also included the elimination of the five points of fellowship, the role of the preacher, and all reference to Lucifer's "popes and priests" were dropped.

The ceremony was also changed to lessen the differences in treatment between men and women. Women no longer are required to covenant to obey their husbands, but instead must covenant only to follow their husbands as their husbands follow God. Also, Eve is no longer explicitly blamed for the Fall or told that Adam "shall rule over thee". The lecture at the veil was also cut.

In the temple endowment, women were previously urged to be a priestess "unto her husband," while men were promised they will be priests to God. In January 2019, that topic was removed from the endowment process, in accordance with other changes that included more lines for Eve in their ritual performance of the Book of Genesis. Also in 2019, a letter from the church's First Presidency stated that "Veiling an endowed woman's face prior to burial is optional." It had previously been required. The letter went on to say that such veiling, "may be done if the sister expressed such a desire while she was living. In cases where the wishes of the deceased sister on this matter are not known, her family should be consulted."

The Church announced in 1988 that 100 million vicarious endowments had been performed on behalf of deceased persons.

== Modern endowment as practiced by the LDS Church ==
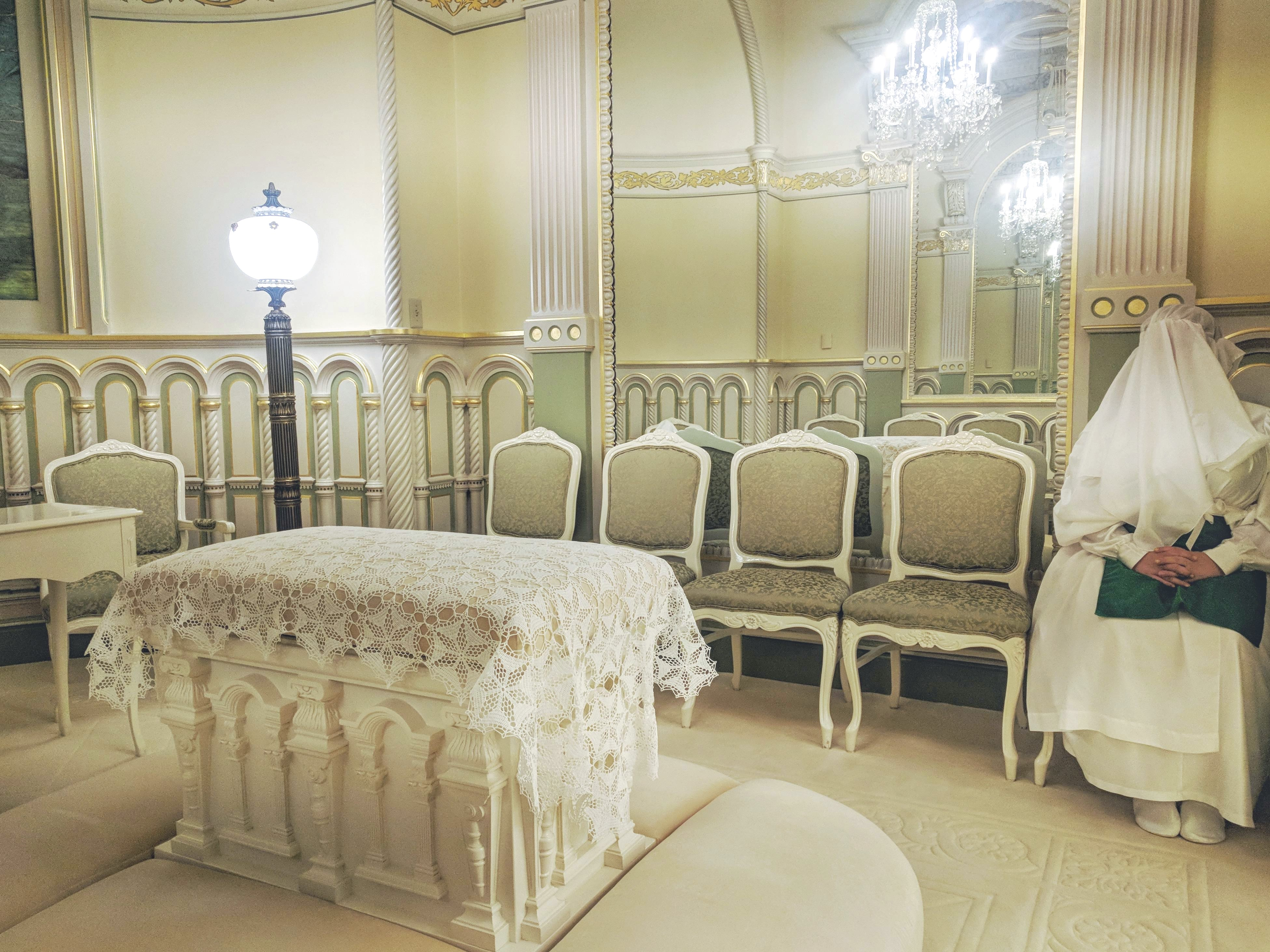
A woman in the ceremonial temple garb used during the modern LDS endowment and sealing marriage ceremonies. For men, a cap and pants are worn instead of a veil and dress.

The most well-known Mormon endowment ceremony is that performed by the LDS Church in its temples. This ceremony is open only to members of the church deemed worthy and given a "temple recommend" by their priesthood leaders after one or more personal interviews. It comprises four parts:

1. An initiatory composed of the preparatory ordinances of washing and anointing
2. An instructional portion with lectures and representations
3. The making of covenants (i.e. oaths)
4. A testing of knowledge

=== The initiatory ===
The "initiatory" is a prelude to the endowment proper, similar to Chrismation, and consists of:

1. Instruction
2. Symbolic washing and anointing ordinances
3. Being clothed in the temple garment
4. Receiving a "new name" in preparation for the endowment.

Preceded only by sealings in 1831, washing and anointing ceremonies are perhaps the earliest practiced temple ordinances for the living since the organization of the LDS Church. There is evidence that these ordinances have been performed since 1832 when they were first practiced in the Whitney Store as part of the School of the Prophets, and were subsequently implemented in the Kirtland endowment.

As part of the endowment ceremony, the ordinance of washing and anointing symbolizes the ritual cleansing of priests that took place at Israel's Tabernacle, Solomon's Temple, and the Second Temple, later known as Herod's Temple. The washing symbolizes being "cleansed from the blood of this generation," and being anointed to become "clean from the blood and sins of this generation."

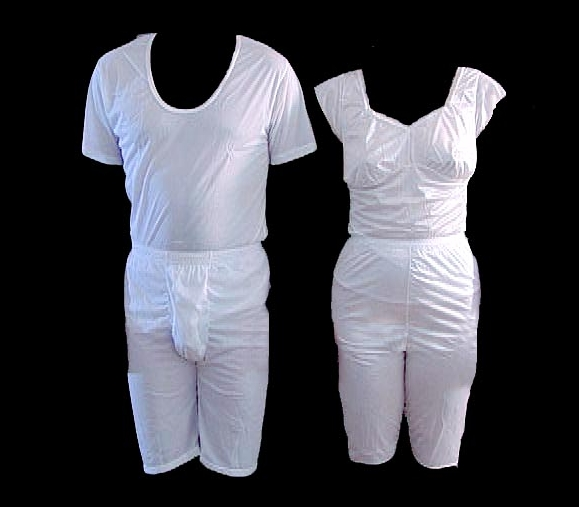
The temple garment underwear Mormons wear daily after receiving them during their initiatory ceremony

After the washing and anointing, the patron is given the temple garment, formally called the "Garment of the Holy Priesthood". This garment represents the "coats of skins" given to Adam and Eve in the Garden of Eden.

Similar ordinances are performed for the living and the dead in LDS temples, where men are:

- Ordained to the priesthood (for the dead only, since a man coming to the temple for his own endowment would have previously received his Melchizedek priesthood ordination)
- Washed with water (which only involves a cursory sprinkling of water)
- Blessed to have the washing sealed
- Anointed with oil
- Blessed to have the anointing sealed
- Clothed in holy garments

Women receive the same ordinances, except for the ordination. As the final part of the initiatory, the patron is given a new name, which is a key word used during the ceremony. In general, this name is only known to the person to whom it is given; however, an endowed LDS woman reveals her name to her endowed husband (but not vice versa). (Note: In support of this practice, the LDS church cites a verses from the Bible referring to a "white stone" with "a new name written" thereon.)

=== The instructional portion ===
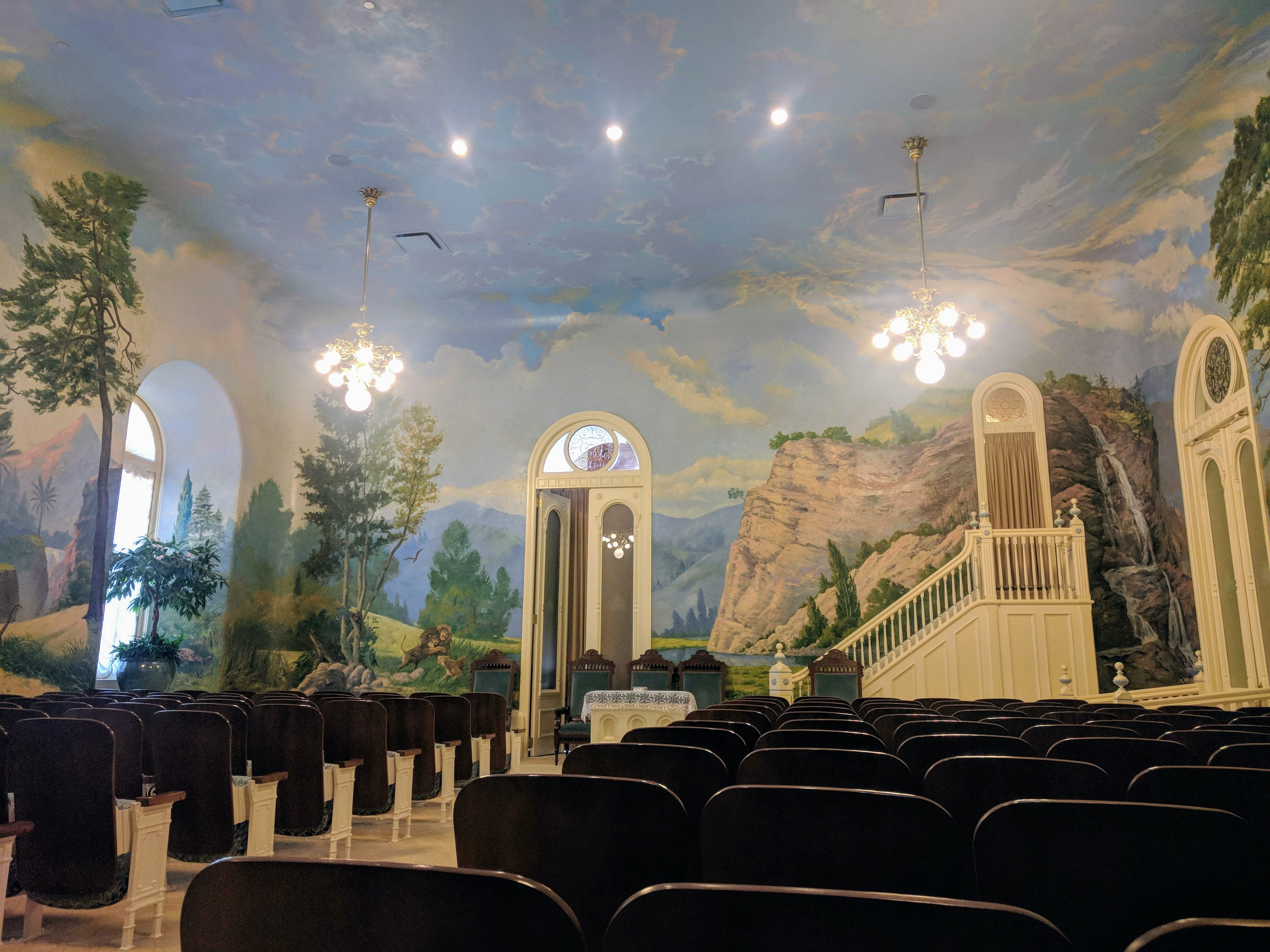
The Telestial Room of the Salt Lake Temple, where part of the instruction occurs

The endowment focuses on LDS belief in a plan of salvation and changes to the ceremony in 2023 included more discussion of Jesus. Parts of the doctrine of the plan of salvation explained include:

- The eternal Nature of God, of Jesus Christ, and their divinity
- The pre-mortal existence and eternal nature of man (mankind lived with God before mortal life)
- The reality of Satan, who is Jesus' and Adam's rebellious spirit brother
- The fall of Adam and the reasons for mortality, trials, and blessings
- The Atonement of Jesus Christ, and the need for the Atonement
- The relationship of grace, faith, and works
- Death, the literal resurrection, and qualifying for one of the three kingdoms of glory (or Outer Darkness)
- The need for personal righteousness, covenant keeping, and love of God and fellow man
- That Heavenly Father loves humanity as his children and wants people to become like he is, to receive joy
- The sanctity and eternal nature of the family

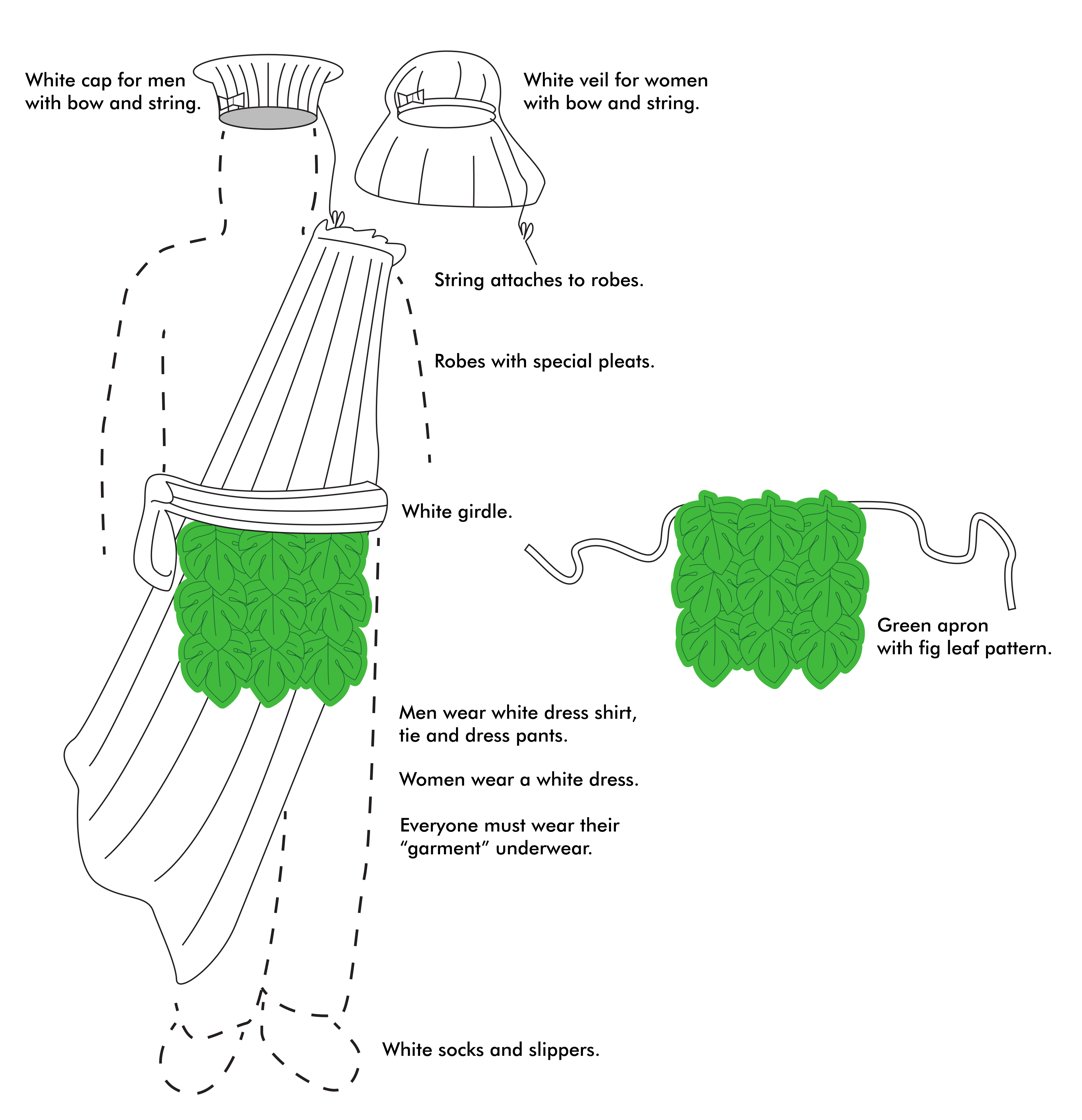
Participants wear the white temple clothing – cap or veil, robe, sash, green apron, and slippers.

Participants makes gestures that are known as "signs"

The endowment is often thought of as a series of lectures where Latter-day Saints are taught about the creation of the world, the events in the Garden of Eden, what happened after Adam and Eve were cast out of the Garden into the "telestial world", and the progression of righteous individuals through "terrestrial" laws to one of the kingdoms of glory and exaltation.

During the ceremony, Latter-day Saints are dressed in temple clothes or temple robes, are taught in ordinance rooms about various gospel laws (including obedience, chastity, sacrifice and consecration) and make covenants to obey these laws. The early Mormon leader Brigham Young taught that participants are given "signs and tokens" that "enable you to walk back to the presence of the Father, passing the angels who stand as sentinels" and gain eternal exaltation. At the end of the ceremony, the participant is "tested" at the veil on their knowledge of what they were taught and covenanted to do, and then admitted into the celestial room, where they may meditate and pray, but are discouraged from lingering.

=== Covenant portion ===
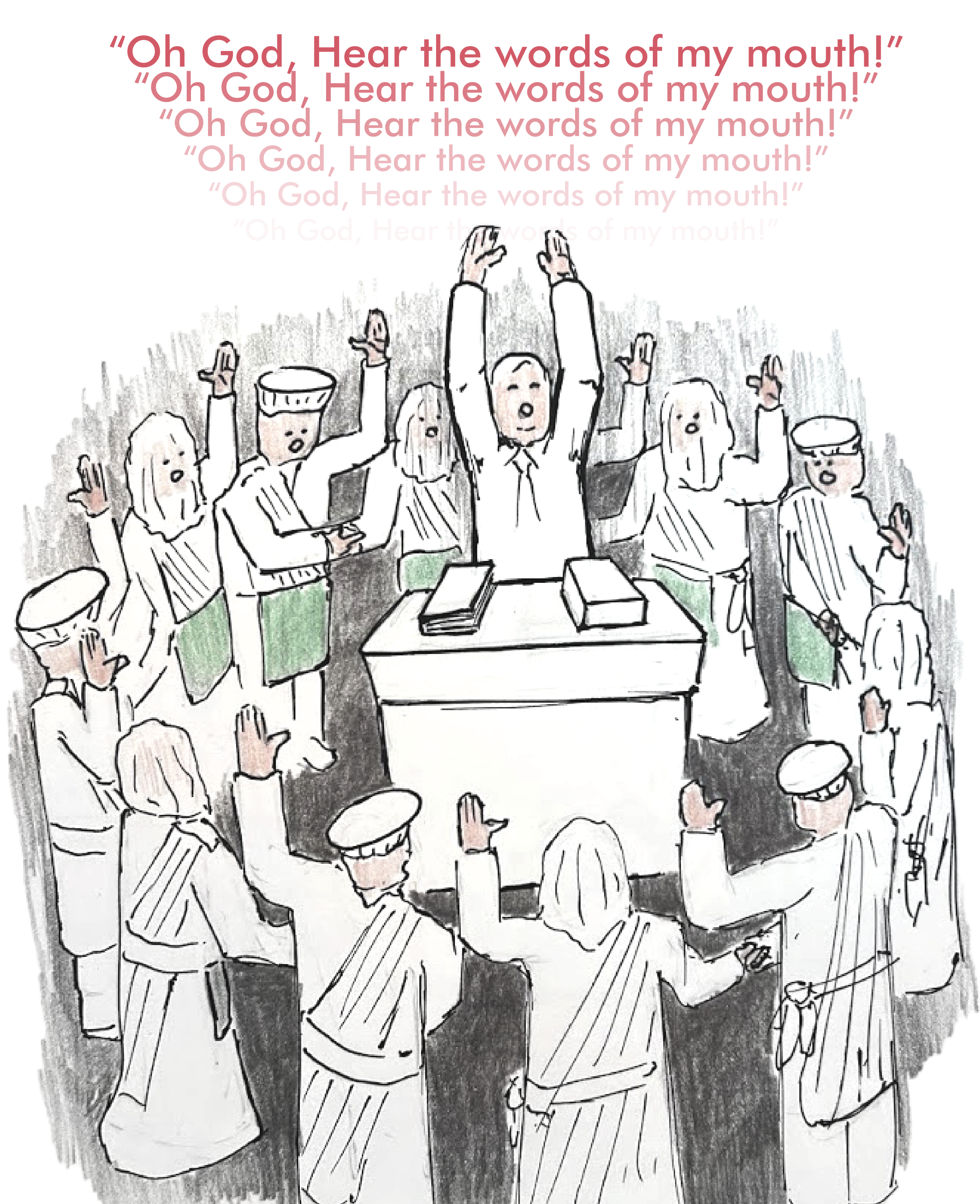
Depiction of the prayer circle around the altar at the conclusion of the covenant portion of the endowment which uses the names and signs.

The LDS Church defines a covenant as a sacred promise one makes to God. (Note: The church's Bible Dictionary states that a covenant is, "Sometimes denot[ing] an agreement between persons (1 Sam. 23:18) or nations (1 Sam. 11:1); more often between God and man; but in this latter case it is important to notice that the two parties to the agreement do not stand in the relation of independent and equal contractors. God in his good pleasure fixes the terms, which man accepts. The same word is sometimes rendered 'testament.' The gospel is so arranged that principles and ordinances are received by covenant placing the recipient under strong obligation and responsibility to honor the commitment. Thus the severe consequences to Ananias and Sapphira, who deliberately broke their covenant and lied unto God (Acts 5:1–11).")

The temple ceremony involves entering into five covenants:

1. Law of Obedience, which includes striving to keep God's commandments.
2. Law of Sacrifice, which means doing all that is possible to support the Lord's work and repenting with a broken heart and contrite spirit.
3. Law of the Gospel, which refers to the higher law that Jesus Christ taught, including baptism, repentance, and being sanctified by the Holy Ghost.
4. Law of Chastity, which means having sexual relations only with the person to whom an individual is legally and lawfully married, according to God's law.
5. Law of Consecration, which means dedicating time, talents, and everything the Lord has blessed an individual with to build up the church.

The promise given in the ceremony is that those who remain faithful will be endowed "with power from on high." At the conclusion of the covenant portion of the ceremony a prayer circle around the altar is conducted using all the tokens' names, and signs.

=== Testing portion ===
Artist's depiction of the four "tokens" or secret handshakes enacted in the testing portion of the endowment; from left to right these are: 1st token of the Aaronic priesthood, 2nd token of the Aaronic priesthood, 1st token of the Melchizedek priesthood (sign of the nail), and 2nd token of the Melchizedek priesthood (patriarchal grip).

At the end of the endowment ceremony the participant is tested at a physical veil by a man representing the Lord on the signs and tokens just learned. Before 1990 at the veil the participant also put their arm around and pressed their cheek, shoulders, knees and feet against the person through the veil in what was called "the five points of fellowship."

=== Requirements for participation ===
The endowment is open only to members of the Church who have a valid "temple recommend." To be eligible to receive a temple recommend, one must be deemed worthy by church leadership and have been a member of the LDS Church for at least one year. A male member of the church must hold the Melchizedek priesthood to participate in the endowment. A temple recommend is signed by the person receiving the recommend, a member of the person's bishopric and a member of the stake presidency, who each perform a personal, one-on-one "worthiness interview." Persons seeking a recommend to attend the temple for the first time and receive their endowment will generally meet with their bishop and stake president.

==== Ineligible groups of members ====
Some members of the church were historically or are currently ineligible for the temple endowment. For about 130 years (between 1847 and 1978) all LDS endowment-related temple ordinances were denied to all Black women and men in a controversial temple racial restriction. As of 2023, all temple ordinances including the endowment continue to be denied for any lesbian, gay, or bisexual person who is in a same-sex marriage or homosexual sexual relationship. Transgender individuals who gender transition (even if just by changing their name, pronouns and gender presentation by clothing and hairstyle) are also barred from temple ordinances as of 2020. These restrictions have received criticism from both outside, and inside the LDS church.

=== Held sacredness and perceived secrecy ===
In the modern endowment ceremony, recipients explicitly agree to a "covenant of non-disclosure" to keep some content such as the ceremony's signs and tokens (and formerly penalties) confidential. The remainder of the ceremony carries with it no covenants of secrecy. Most Latter-day Saints are generally unwilling to discuss specific details of the ceremony, and have been instructed by top church leaders that the only place where the temple ceremonies should be discussed, even amongst faithful members, is within the temple. The apostle David A. Bednar said temple ceremonies are "not secret; they're sacred." Many Mormons hold the making of these covenants to be highly sacred, and believe that details of the ceremony should be kept from those deemed insufficiently righteous.

==== Penalties ====
Depiction of the pre-1990 penalty gestures in the endowment ceremony which pantomimed the slitting of the throat (left-most image), heart, and bowels.

Prior to revisions in 1990, the LDS Church's version of the endowment included penalties which were specified punishment for breaking an oath of secrecy after receiving the Nauvoo endowment ceremony. Adherents promised they would submit to execution in specific ways should they reveal certain contents of the ceremony. In the ceremony participants each symbolically enacted three of the methods of their execution. (Note: In 1990 the LDS Church removed the "penalty" portions of the ceremony.) Aspects of the ceremony held confidential have been published in various sources, unauthorized by the LDS Church.

==== Historical organizational statements on confidentiality ====
Official church publications have consistently stated that temple ceremonies are confidential and not to be discussed outside the temple. In 1904, B. H. Roberts declared in testimony to the United States Senate that certain aspects of the endowment ceremony were intended to be "secret from the world". This information includes, in the initiation and instructional/testing phases of the endowment ceremony, certain names and symbolic gestures called tokens and signs. (Note: This idea has been repeated over time with statements reiterated by ElRay L. Christiansen in 1973, apostle Boyd K. Packer in 2002, and in the church's official online newsroom among others.)

In 2021, the online versions of the General Handbook the specific covenants made during the endowment have been enumerated. Since that publication, the covenants made and their doctrinal implications have been discussed in more public forums including the publication of an article listing the covenants made and explaining their significance.

==== Perceived implications of confidentiality policy ====
Some Mormons have suggested that the reluctance to discuss the endowment encourages attacks and unauthorized exposés by evangelical Christians and others, and therefore advocate a more transparent attitude toward the ceremony.

=== LDS comparisons of modern endowment to ancient practices ===
The church's stance is that the endowment is of ancient origin, revealed from the earliest time to the biblical Adam. Publications by LDS adherents find parallels between the endowment and ancient traditions. The LDS Church temple is referred to as a "house of learning" by Mormons since it is a "kind of educational environment teaching by action and educating through ritual." The endowment ordinance, as presented in LDS temples, has been referred to as a "ritual drama" presented in a "theatrical setting". Comparative studies of the art, architecture, and rituals found in Mormonism, such as the endowment, reveal parallels to early Catholic and Jewish traditions.

The Testament of Levi discusses ancient ceremonies and clothing that LDS scholar Blake Ostler compares to the modern LDS endowment. (Note: Testament of Levi, 8:2-10 says: "And I saw seven men in white clothing, who were saying to me, 'Arise, put on the vestments of the priesthood, the crown of righteousness, the oracle of understanding, the robe of truth, the breastplate of faith, the miter for the head, and the apron for prophetic power.' Each carried one of these and put them on me and said, 'From now on be a priest, you and all your posterity.' The first anointed me with holy oil and gave me a staff. The second washed me with pure water, fed me by hand with bread and holy wine, and put on me a holy and glorious vestment. The third put on me something made of linen, like an ephod. The fourth placed [...] around me a girdle which was like purple. The fifth gave me a branch of rich olive wood. The sixth placed a wreath on my head. The seventh placed the priestly diadem on me and filled my hands with incense, in order that I might serve as priest for the Lord God.") Some LDS scholars have suggested that Jewish temple initiation was later merged with early Christian baptismal initiation sometime after the destruction of the Second Temple. By the fourth century CE, Christian baptism had adopted a more complex set of rituals accompanying it, including washing ceremonies, physical anointing with oil, being signed with a cross on the forehead, and receiving white garments and a new name, all which paralleled the Jewish initiation for priests and kings. St. Cyril of Jerusalem, in his Catechetical Lectures, related the anointing with oil at baptism with the anointing of a priest and king in the Old Testament, suggesting that the initiate actually became a priest and king in Christ.

The general theme of ascension through multiple gates or veils of heaven is found all throughout early Jewish, Christian, Muslim, and other Near Eastern religious writings, as well as in the Bible. Early works often describe angels and other sentinels which are set at these points, and several of these state that the ascending individual would be required to give specific signs and names to the sentinels in order to pass through the veil. The descriptions of key words, signs, and tokens being presented to the sentinels of the veils of heaven are particularly prevalent in old Gnostic Christian and Mandaean writings, and in Jewish lore. In one of the Nag Hammadi texts, Jesus promises that those who accept him would pass by each of the gates of heaven without fear and would be perfected in the third heaven. The Coptic Book of 1 Jeu describes Jesus instructing the apostles in the hand-signs, names, and seals that they must use before the guardians of heaven would remove the veils of heaven to allow them passage. 3 Enoch also describes the names and seals given to the angels.

The Latter Day Saint temple garment is usually compared by Mormon scholars with the "linen breeches" (michnasayim/mikhnesei bahd) and the "coat of linen" (kuttoneth) that ancient Israelite priests were commanded to wear. According to the Talmud, worn-out undergarments and priestly sashes were burned, being used as torch wicks in the temple. The temple garment has been compared to the modern tallit katan, a religious undershirt of Orthodox and ultra-Orthodox Judaism. Both the temple garments in Mormonism and the tallit katan are meant to be worn all day under regular clothing as a constant reminder of the covenants, promises, and obligations the wearer is under. Latter-day Saint scholars interpret a biblical scripture in Luke as instructing the apostles to wait for both the pouring out of the Spirit on the day of Pentecost and the endowment ceremony before going out to evangelize.
