= Adam and Eve in Mormonism =

View of the LDS church on Adam and Eve

The Church of Jesus Christ of Latter-day Saints (LDS Church) teaches that Adam and Eve were the first man and the first woman to live on the earth and that their fall was an essential step in the plan of salvation. Adam in particular is a central figure in Mormon cosmology. Latter Day Saints scripture most notably applies the Mormon concept of divine pre-existence to Adam to state that Adam and Michael are one and the same, having taken on a mortal form after his victory in the War in Heaven.

== Identity of Adam and Eve ==
According to LDS Church teachings, all people born on the earth lived with God the Father and Jesus Christ in a pre-mortal life. Adam and Eve were "among our Father's noblest children" and they were "foreordained" to be the parents of the human race. In the pre-mortal life, Adam was the archangel Michael. As Michael, Adam "led the forces of God against the armies of Lucifer" in the War in Heaven. LDS Church scripture provides no information about Eve prior to her earth life, but it is believed that "she must have been a choice daughter of God."

In the LDS Church's temple endowment, it is taught that Adam is Michael and that he assisted Jehovah in the creation.

== In the Garden of Eden ==
Adam and Eve's bodies were created by God the Father and Jesus Christ and were placed in the Garden of Eden, which Joseph Smith taught was located in or near Jackson County, Missouri. When they were created, their bodies were not mortal and they could not die or have children, and they did not know right from wrong.

Adam and Eve were married by God in Eden, and he commanded them to have children. God told them they could eat of any tree in the garden except for the tree of the knowledge of good and evil, and that the day they ate the fruit from that tree they would die. Adam was made “lord or governor of all things on earth, and at the same time [enjoyed] communion … with his Maker, without a veil to separate between.”

== Fall ==
Satan tempted Adam and Eve to eat of the prohibited fruit. Eve yielded to temptation and ate of the fruit; when Adam learned that Eve had done so, he ate the fruit too.

Because they ate of the forbidden fruit, Adam and Eve underwent the "fall". As God had promised, the bodies of Adam and Eve became mortal and they became subject to physical death, as well as sickness and pain. Erastus Snow taught that the fruits of the Earth literally made Adam and Eve's bodies mortal. They also underwent "spiritual death": they were separated from the presence of God by being cast out of the Garden of Eden. Due to the fall, Adam and Eve also learned the difference between good and evil and became capable of having children, as God had originally commanded.

=== Positive interpretation of the fall ===
Unlike some Christians, Latter-day Saints generally do not see the fall of Adam and Eve as a serious sin or as an overwhelmingly negative event. Rather, the fall is viewed as "a necessary step in the plan of life and a great blessing to all of us. Because of the Fall, we are blessed with physical bodies, the right to choose between good and evil, and the opportunity to gain eternal life. None of these privileges would have been ours had Adam and Eve remained in the garden." Latter-day Saint scripture reports that Adam and Eve later rejoiced that they had chosen to partake of the fruit, and the Book of Mormon teaches that the fall was necessary for humankind to exist and for them to develop and eventually experience joy, which is the ultimate purpose of existence: "Adam fell that men might be; and men are, that they might have joy." Furthermore, the LDS version of the fall of Adam and Eve emphasizes the fall was a part of God's plan: "But behold, all things have been done in the wisdom of him who knoweth all things," as God had "foreordained" and prepared Jesus Christ to be slain "from the foundation of the world" in order to redeem mankind from the fall. In the early church, the idea that Eve's promised hardships were passed on to all women was commonly accepted. Valerie Cassler argues that God's description of her future hardships was not a curse, but a natural consequence that comes from living in a world with opposites.

The fall of Adam and Eve as viewed by Latter-day Saints denies the concept of original sin. They instead believe that "little children are whole, for they are not capable of committing sin; wherefore the curse of Adam is taken from them in [Jesus Christ]." Joseph Smith also stated that "men will be punished for their own sins, and not for Adam’s transgression." Latter-day Saint doctrine holds firm that through repentance, Adam and Eve were eventually forgiven of their transgression in Eden.

== Post-fall lives ==
Latter-day Saint scripture teaches that Adam and Eve had "sons and daughters" after the fall, including Cain, Abel, and Seth. Adam and Eve worshiped God, offered animal sacrifices, and were taught by an angel about Jesus Christ. Latter-day Saint doctrine teaches that the "coats of skins" Adam and Eve received were to remind them of the coming of Jesus Christ who, through the atonement, would "cover their sins". Adam is believed to be "the world's first Christian," as well as the first prophet. Adam was taught the plan of salvation, was baptized in water in the name of Jesus Christ, received the gift of the Holy Ghost, and was given the Melchizedek priesthood. Adam ordained his descendants to the priesthood.

Three years prior to his death, Adam and his righteous posterity gathered in the valley of Adam-ondi-Ahman in present-day Daviess County, Missouri, where Adam and Eve had settled after being expelled from the Garden of Eden. At this meeting, Adam bestowed his last blessing on his descendants. The premortal Jesus Christ appeared as the unembodied God Jehovah at the meeting to bless Adam and Adam uttered prophecies, which are said to have been recorded by Enoch. Adam died when he was 930 years old.

== Visions and prophecies about Adam and Eve ==
Some presidents of the LDS Church report to have had visions of Adam and Eve. In 1836, Joseph Smith said that he saw Adam in the celestial kingdom and in 1918 Joseph F. Smith said that he saw Adam and Eve in the world of spirits when Jesus visited there between his death and resurrection. Joseph Smith also said that the voice of Adam was heard near the Susquehanna River "detecting the devil when he appeared as an angel of light".

Joseph Smith prophesied that Adam would one day return to Adam-ondi-Ahman "to visit his people". Thousands will attend this meeting with Adam, which will be prior to and in preparation of the Second Coming of Jesus. Adam is believed to be the "Ancient of Days" prophesied of in the Book of Daniel. At the Second Coming, Adam will "sound his trump", which will signal the resurrection of the dead. At the end of the millennial rule of Christ, Adam will lead the forces of good against Satan in the final "battle of the great God", also known as the battle of Gog and Magog.

One LDS Church apostle has suggested that it may have been Adam who was sent as the angel Michael to "strengthen" Jesus when he was praying in the Garden of Gethsemane during his passion.

== Adam–God doctrine ==
Several early leaders of the LDS Church taught that Adam was God because he was the father of the human race. This doctrine was taught several times by Brigham Young during general conferences and was supported by other high-ranking leaders of the church. However, the Adam–God doctrine never gained wide support by the church as a whole. Some members and critics of the church claimed that Young was declaring Adam to be God the Father. This specific interpretation was later repudiated by church president Spencer W. Kimball.

== See also ==
- Mormon views on evolution
- Original sin according to The Church of Jesus Christ of Latter-day Saints
- Tree of life (biblical)
