= Oath of vengeance =

Past Mormon temple ritual promising to pray for divine retribution

In Mormonism, the oath of vengeance (or law of vengeance) was part of the endowment ritual of the Church of Jesus Christ of Latter-day Saints (LDS Church) implemented in 1845. Participants swore an oath to pray for God to avenge the blood of prophets. The term prophets was not explicitly clarified in reported wording of the oath, but many sources have reported it referred to the brothers Joseph and Hyrum Smith, who were killed by a mob the year before Smith's primary successor, Brigham Young, reportedly added the oath. The oath was part of the LDS endowment Temple (Latter Day Saints) ceremony for over 80 years (1845–1927).

The officiant of the ritual reportedly enjoined the participants as follows: "You and each of you do covenant and promise that you will pray and never cease to pray to Almighty God to avenge the blood of the prophets upon this nation, and that you will teach the same to your children and to your children's children unto the third and fourth generation." Participants swore to keep the oath a secret under penalty of execution as part of the temple penalties.

== Incorporation into the Nauvoo endowment ==
The oath of vengeance is understood by some modern historians to have been added to the Nauvoo endowment under the direction of Brigham Young by 1845 in the Nauvoo Temple, soon after the 1844 death of Joseph Smith. Such historians posit that participants agreed to be bound by the following oath:

You and each of you do covenant and promise that you will pray and never cease to pray to Almighty God to avenge the blood of the prophets upon this nation, and that you will teach the same to your children and to your children's children unto the third and fourth generation.

According to Smith's youngest brother William Smith the wording of the oath taken in the Nauvoo temple was in part, "You do solemnly swear ... that you will avenge the blood of Joseph Smith on this nation, and teach your children ... and carry out hostilities against this nation, and to keep the same intent a profound secret now and forever." The prophets believed by many to be referenced are Joseph and Hyrum Smith, who were killed by a mob in 1844 while jailed in Carthage, Illinois. The nation is likewise believed by many to be the United States. The existence of the oath was confirmed in an 1889 Salt Lake City meeting of the First Presidency in which they discussed "the propriety of ... more fully explaining the instructions to pray for the avenging the blood of the prophets in the Endowments."

Such historians further posit that the oath entered the endowment when many Mormons yearned for retribution for the murder of their church's founders. At least one member felt the oath to include a personal obligation that "if he had ever met any of those who had taken a hand in that massacre he would undoubtedly have attempted to avenge the blood of the martyrs." One source states members understood the oath to require only prayer.

The prayer to which endowed members obligated themselves took place in at least some cases as part of the prayer circle ceremony, which was also part of the endowment but was often performed separately.

In contrast, Wilford Woodruff (the fourth President of the LDS Church) stated that this oath had been a part of the temple endowment ceremony for years prior to the assassinations of Joseph and Hyrum (Wilford received his own endowment in December 1843); rather than being inspired by the deaths of Joseph and Hyrum, Woodruff stated that this prayer was inspired by two verses in Revelation 6 of the New Testament:

Reporter—One of the aims of the proceedings now going on in court is to prove that there is something antagonistic to the government in the "Mormon" Endowments. What about that charge? President Woodruff—I have already said that there is nothing of that kind in any part or phase of "Mormonism." I ought to know about that as I am one of the oldest members of the Church. A good deal is being made of a form of prayer based upon two verses in the sixth chapter of the Revelations of St. John, as contained in the New Testament. It relates to praying that God might avenge the blood of the prophets. An attempt has, I see, been made to connect this with avenging the death of Joseph and Hyrum Smith, and to have reference to this nation. It can have no such application, as the Endowments were given long before the death of Joseph and Hyrum Smith, and have not been changed. This nation or government has never been charged by the "Mormon" people with the assassination of Joseph and Hyrum Smith, as it is well known the murder was the act of a local mob disguised.

== Removal from Endowment ==
Beginning in 1919, LDS Church president Heber J. Grant appointed a committee charged with revising the endowment ceremony, which was done under the direction of apostle George F. Richards from 1921 to 1929. Richards revised the ceremony to eliminate the oath of vengeance, and the revision was formally implemented in 1927.

== Eyewitness accounts ==
Heber C. Kimball, a member of the Quorum of the Twelve Apostles of the LDS Church, described the oath of vengeance in his diary on December 21, 1845.

Increase and Maria Van Duesen, a married couple, describe their participation in the oath of vengeance in the Nauvoo Temple on January 29, 1846.

Ann Eliza Young, former wife of LDS Church president Brigham Young, described, in her autobiography, her experience taking the oath of vengeance.

A woman known only as "Mrs G.H.R." attended an endowment ceremony in September 1879 in Salt Lake City, Utah Territory. She provided the information for a Salt Lake Tribune article detailing the endowment ceremony. In it, she described the oath of vengeance.

In 1889, several members of the LDS Church that had emigrated from other countries applied for citizenship to the United States. Their loyalty to the United States was called into question due to rumors of oaths taken during the endowment ceremony. The following testimonies are found in the transcripts of those court proceedings.

Abraham H. Cannon, a member of the Quorum of the Twelve Apostles of the LDS Church, wrote in his diary, December 6, 1889, the description his father, apostle George Q. Cannon, gave of the oath of vengeance.

During the Reed Smoot hearings, December 1904, in sworn testimony in front of the United States Senate, several witnesses described the oath of vengeance.

== Relation to other Mormon "blood" doctrines ==
Symbolic penalties in the LDS Church temple ceremony, which were discontinued church-wide in 1990, depicted "throat-slitting and disemboweling gestures as signs that they [would] not reveal" the sacred things taught in the temple endowment ordinance. Symbolic penalties were common as teaching methods in the 1800s in oath-bound societies (e.g., Freemasonry, etc.), and were inspired in the Church not only by such societies but also by Biblical and Book of Mormon texts.

The oath of vengeance is related to blood atonement in that both require capital punishment for sins regarded as unusually heinous. In early Mormonism, repentance for crimes such as murder or adultery, where restitution is not possible, involved personal sacrifice in order to make redemption possible through the atonement of Jesus Christ. Blood atonement was preached as a method of personal redemption, preferably voluntary, that could reinstate the possibility of salvation.
