= Anointed Quorum =

The Anointed Quorum, also known as the Quorum of the Anointed, or the Holy Order, was a select body of men and women who Joseph Smith initiated into Mormon temple ordinances at Nauvoo, Illinois, which gave them special standing in the early Latter Day Saint movement. Beginning in May 1842, Smith gave this group, which ultimately numbered over sixty persons, their washings and anointings and endowments in the upper floor of his Red Brick Store on Water Street, as well as in a few private residences in the city. Most couples, but not all, also received their Second Anointing. Members typically referred to their meetings, which were held usually every two weeks, as prayer circles, because prayer played an important role in the group's religious activities.

Nearly all members of the Anointed Quorum were important leaders and their wives in the church or community, including the First Presidency and Quorum of the Twelve Apostles. After Smith's death in June 1844, members of the Anointed Quorum continued to meet under the direction of Brigham Young, even admitting additional persons to the group. As the Nauvoo Temple neared completion during 1845, they prepared the building's upper floor for the administration of ordinances. Between December 1845 and February 1846, the Anointed Quorum extended the same rituals they had received from Smith to over 5,000 men and women living in the vicinity of Nauvoo.

After the Mormons left Nauvoo in 1846, the Anointed Quorum ceased to exist as an organized group. The Anointed Quorum dealt essentially with spiritual and sacerdotal matters, but it was never an official administrative body of the church.

== Members ==
The following individuals were members of the Anointed Quorum (spouses are listed together and plural marriage relationships are indicated):

Name	Notes
James Adams	Lawyer and close friend of Joseph Smith.
Harriet Denton Adams	Wife of James Adams
Almon W. Babbitt	First secretary and treasurer of the Territory of Utah, and a member of the Council of Fifty.
Louisa Beaman	Plural wife of Joseph Smith
John Milton Bernhisel	The original delegate of the Utah Territory in the United States House of Representatives (1851–1859, 1861–1863) and a member of the Council of Fifty.
Reynolds Cahoon	Member of the Presiding Bishopric and one of the inaugural members of the Council of Fifty.
Thirza Stiles Cahoon	Wife of Reynolds Cahoon
William Clayton	Member and Clerk of the Council of Fifty.
Margaret Moon Clayton	Wife of William Clayton
Alpheus Cutler	Member of the Council of Fifty. After the succession crisis, he became the 1st President of The Church of Jesus Christ (Cutlerite).
Lois Lathrop Culter	Wife of Alpheus Cutler
Elizabeth Davis Durfee	Plural wife of Joseph Smith
Harriet Page Wheeler Decker	
Joseph Fielding	Member of the Council of Fifty, brother of Mary Fielding, the second wife of Hyrum Smith, and an uncle of Joseph F. Smith, the sixth president of the church.
Hannah Greenwood Fielding	Wife of Joseph Fielding
Olive Grey Frost	Plural wife of Joseph Smith
John P. Greene	Member of the Council of Fifty and the chief of police in Nauvoo, Illinois in 1844. Greene supervised the destruction of the press of the Nauvoo Expositor which set in motion a chain of events that eventually led to the death of Joseph Smith.
Charles Hyde	
Orson Hyde	A member and President of the Quorum of the Twelve Apostles, and a member of the Council of Fifty.
Marinda Nancy Johnson Hyde	Wife of Orson Hyde and a plural wife of Joseph Smith
Zina Dianatha Huntington Jacobs	3rd General President of the Relief Society. Zina was a plural wife of Joseph Smith and later Brigham Young
Heber C. Kimball	Member of the Quorum of the Twelve Apostles, First Counselor in the First Presidency, and a member of the Council of Fifty.
Vilate Murray Kimball	Wife of Heber C. Kimball
Helen Mar Kimball	Plural wife of Joseph Smith
Joseph C. Kingsbury	
Sarah Ann Whitney Kingsbury	Wife of Joseph C. Kingsbury and a plural wife of Joseph Smith and later Heber C. Kimball
Mary Elizabeth Rollins Lightner	Plural wife of Joseph Smith
William Law	Second Counselor in the First Presidency to Joseph Smith. After his excommunication for apostasy, Law published the Nauvoo Expositor, the destruction of which set in motion a chain of events that eventually led to the death of Joseph Smith.
Jane Silverthorne Law	Wife of William Law
Cornelius P. Lott	A member of the Council of Fifty and a Danite leader.
Permelia Darrow Lott	Wife of Cornelius P. Lott
Amasa Lyman	Member of the Quorum of the Twelve Apostles, counselor in the First Presidency, and a member of the Council of Fifty.
Mary L. Tanner Lyman	Wife of Amasa M. Lyman
William Marks	First counselor in the First Presidency of the Reorganized Church of Jesus Christ of Latter Day Saints and a member of the Council of Fifty.
Rosannah Robinson Marks	Wife of William Marks
George Miller	Second Bishop of the Church and member of the Council of Fifty.
Mary Catherine Fry Miller	Wife of George Miller
Ruth Moon	Plural wife of William Clayton
Isaac Morley	First Counselor to the Bishop of the Church and member of the Council of Fifty.
Lucy Gunn Morley	Wife of Isaac Morley
Fanny Young Murray	
Joseph B. Noble	
Mary A. Beaman Noble	Wife of Joseph B. Noble.
John E. Page	Member of the Quorum of the Twelve Apostles, and a member of the Council of Fifty.
Mary Judd Page	Wife of John E. Page
Orson Pratt	An original member of the Quorum of Twelve Apostles, member of the Council of Fifty and Official church historian.
Parley P. Pratt	An original member of the Quorum of Twelve Apostles, member of the Council of Fifty.
Mary A. F. Pratt	Wife of Parley P. Pratt and a plural wife of Joseph Smith
W. W. Phelps	A church printer, editor, and songwriter, scribe to Joseph Smith, and a member of the Council of Fifty.
Sally Waterman Phelps	Wife of W. W. Phelps
Levi Richards	Served as a physician for Joseph Smith and a member of the Council of Fifty.
Willard Richards	Second Counselor in the First Presidency, member of the Quorum of the Twelve Apostles, Official church historian, and a member of the Council of Fifty.
Jennetta Richards Richards	Wife of Willard Richards
Sidney Rigdon	Counselor in the First Presidency of Church of Jesus Christ of Latter Day Saints and a member of the Council of Fifty. After the Succession Crisis he became President of the Church of Jesus Christ of the Children of Zion.
Lucy Decker Seely	Plural wife of Brigham Young
Sylvia P. Sessions	Plural wife of Joseph Smith
Agnes Coolbrith Smith	Plural wife of Joseph Smith
George A. Smith	First Counselor in the First Presidency, member of the Quorum of the Twelve Apostles, Official church historian, and a member of the Council of Fifty.
Bathsheba W. Smith	4th General President of the Relief Society and wife of George A. Smith.
Hyrum Smith	Brother of Joseph Smith, Assistant President of the Church, Presiding Patriarch, Apostle, Counselor in the First Presidency, and a member of the Council of Fifty.
Mary Fielding Smith	Wife of Hyrum Smith
John Smith	Uncle of Joseph Smith, 4th Presiding Patriarch, Assistant Counselor in the First Presidency, and a member of the Council of Fifty.
Clarissa Lyman Smith	Wife of John Smith
Lucy Mack Smith	Mother of Joseph Smith and author of Biographical Sketches of Joseph Smith, the Prophet, and His Progenitors for Many Generations.
Joseph Smith	Founder of the Latter Day Saint movement.
Emma Hale Smith	Wife of Joseph Smith and 1st President of the Female Relief Society of Nauvoo.
Samuel H. Smith	One of the younger brothers of Joseph Smith, and one of the Eight Witnesses.
William Smith	One of the younger brothers of Joseph Smith, member of the Quorum of the Twelve Apostles, 3rd Presiding Patriarch (LDS Church), and a member of the Council of Fifty. After the Succession Crisis he became Petitioner for Patriarchate (RLDS Church).
Eliza R. Snow	2nd General President of the Relief Society. Plural wife of Joseph Smith and Brigham Young
Orson Spencer	Member of the Council of Fifty and 1st President of the University of Utah
Catherine Curtis Spencer	Wife of Orson Spencer
John Taylor	3rd President of The Church of Jesus Christ of Latter-day Saints
Leonora Cannon Taylor	Wife of John Taylor
Mercy Fielding Thompson	
Newel K. Whitney	First Bishop of the Church and a member of the Council of Fifty.
Elizabeth Ann Smith Whitney	Wife of Newel K. Whitney.
Lyman Wight	Member of the Quorum of the Twelve and a member of the Council of Fifty. After the Succession Crisis he became President of the Church of Christ(Wightite)
Wilford Woodruff	4th President of The Church of Jesus Christ of Latter-day Saints
Phoebe Carter Woodruff	First wife of Wilford Woodruff.
Lucien Woodworth	
Phebe Watrous Woodworth	Wife of Lucien Woodworth
Brigham Young	2nd President of The Church of Jesus Christ of Latter-day Saints
Mary Ann Angell Young	Wife of Brigham Young
Joseph Young	Brother of Brigham Young, one of the First Seven Presidents of the First Quorum of the Seventy, and a member of the Council of Fifty.
Jane A. Bicknell Young	Wife of Joseph Young

== See also ==
- Council of Fifty
- Council of Friends
