= Temple garment =

Undergarments used by adherents of the Latter Day Saint movement

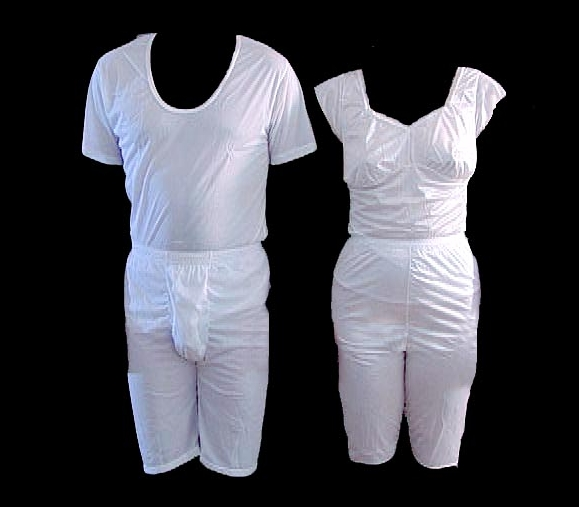
Post-1979 two-piece temple garments end just above the knee for both sexes. Women's garments have cap sleeves with either a rounded or sweetheart neckline. Male tops are available in T-shirt styles.

A temple garment, also referred to as garments, the garment of the holy priesthood, or Mormon underwear, is a type of underwear worn by adherents of the Latter Day Saint (LDS) movement after they have taken part in the endowment ceremony. Garments are required for any individual who previously participated in the endowment ceremony to enter a temple. The undergarments are viewed as a symbolic reminder of the covenants made in temple ceremonies and are seen as a symbolic and/or literal source of protection.

The garment is given as part of the washing and anointing portion of the endowment, and is worn under the temple robes during the endowment and sealing (i.e. LDS marriage) ceremonies. The temple garment is worn primarily by members of the Church of Jesus Christ of Latter-day Saints (LDS Church) and by members of some Mormon fundamentalist churches. Adherents consider them to be sacred and inappropriate for public display. Anti-Mormon activists have occasionally publicly displayed or defaced temple garments to express their opposition to the LDS Church.

== Purpose ==
Scholars of Latter-day Saint material culture have described the temple garment as serving both devotional and identity-forming functions. Worn beneath ordinary clothing, it serves as a reminder of temple covenants and helps reinforce religious identity and commitment.

The nature of the protection believed to be afforded by temple garments is ambiguous and varies between adherents. Researchers who interviewed a sample of Latter-day Saints who wear the temple garment reported that virtually all wearers expressed a belief that wearing the garment provided "spiritual protection" and encouraged them to keep their covenants. Some of those interviewed "asserted that the garment also provided physical protection, while others seemed less certain of any physical aspect to protection." In Mormon folklore, tales are told of Latter-day Saints who credit their temple garments with helping them survive car wrecks, fires, and natural disasters.

In 2014, the LDS Church released an explanatory video online that showed photographs of both temple garments and the outer clothing used in temple worship. The video states that there "is nothing magical or mystical about temple garments."

== Sanctity among members ==
To members of the LDS Church, the temple garment represents the sacred and personal aspects of their relationship with God. Church president Joseph F. Smith taught that the garment was to be held as "the most sacred of all things in the world, next to their own virtue, next to their own purity of life." For this reason, most church members feel uncomfortable discussing the garment in a casual or disrespectful manner. Some church leaders have compared the garment to the clerical vestments worn by clergy of other churches. Church leaders have publicly discussed the above principles and beliefs in general terms since the mid-1840s. Many Latter-day Saints view the garment associated with the temple rites as sacred. Some church members have criticized the sale of garments on online auction sites. Members are instructed not to dispose of old or torn garments by throwing them in the trash, but rather to cut them to pieces with scissors, or burn them instead.

== Garment origins and evolution ==
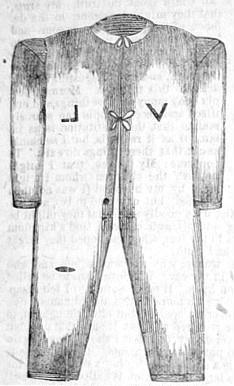
Temple garment circa 1879

The garment as first described in the 1840s was a one-piece undergarment extending to the ankles and the wrists, resembling a union suit, (Note: Note that the union suit postdates the temple garment by at least two decades, as the first union suit was patented in the United States in 1868. The union suit originated during the 19th-century women's clothing reform, and soon gained popularity among men as well.) with an open crotch and a collar. It was made of unbleached cotton and was held together with ties in a double knot. Most garments were home-made.

=== Garment markings ===
The original garment had four marks that were snipped into the cloth as part of the original Nauvoo endowment ceremony. These marks were a reverse-L-shaped symbol on the right breast, a V-shaped symbol on the left breast, and horizontal marks at the navel and over the right knee. These cuts were later replaced by embroidered or screen-printed symbols.

The marks in the garments are sacred symbols. The V-shaped symbol on the left breast was referred to as "The compass", while the reverse-L-shaped symbol on the right breast was referred to by early church leaders as "The Square".

According to a description by church president John Taylor in 1883, the "Square" represents "the justice and fairness of our Heavenly Father, that we will receive all the good that is coming to us or all that we earn, on a square deal", and the "Compass" represents "the North Star". In addition to the Square and Compass, Taylor described the other symbols as follows: the collar represented the idea that the Lord's "yoke is easy and [his] burden is light", or the "Crown of the Priesthood"; the double-knotted strings represented "the Trinity" and "the marriage covenant"; the navel mark represents "strength in the navel and marrow in the bones"; and the knee mark represents "that every knee shall bow and every tongue confess that Jesus is the Christ".

In 1926, LDS Church apostle David O. McKay offered an updated description that was later incorporated into the church's endowment ceremony. According to McKay's explanation, the "mark of the Compass" represents "an undeviating course leading to eternal life; a constant reminder that desires, appetites, and passions are to be kept within the bounds the Lord has set; and that all truth may be circumscribed into one great whole"; the "mark of the Square" represents "exactness and honor" in keeping the commandments and covenants of God; the navel mark represents "the need of constant nourishment to body and spirit"; and the "knee mark" represents "that every knee shall bow and every tongue shall confess that Jesus is the Christ". Unlike Taylor, McKay did not describe the symbolism of the collar or the tie-strings because those elements of the garment had been eliminated in 1922.

=== Garment color ===
In 1893, the church expressed an official preference for white garments, which has since become the standard color, with the exception of military garments. Members of the military can submit regulation military T-shirts of any color to the church for custom addition of the symbolic markings. While sand-colored or "coyote tan" garments were once available, the church's preferred supplier no longer manufactures them.

=== Design ===
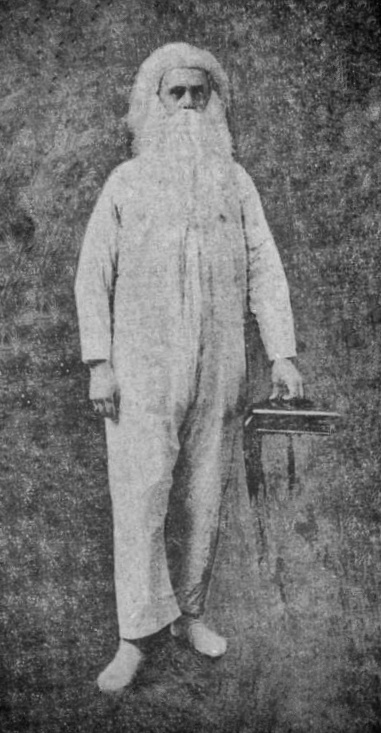
Pre-1923, union-suit style temple garment in a 1904 newspaper photograph.

For several decades after its introduction in the 1840s, the original 19th-century union-suit style was accepted within Mormon doctrine as being unalterable. In 1906, church president Joseph F. Smith characterized as a "grievous sin" any attempt, in the name of changing fashion trends, to modify the 1840s garment pattern, which he characterized as "sacred, unchanged, and unaltered from the very pattern in which God gave them." However, while the original pattern of the garment is still in use by some Mormon fundamentalists, the LDS Church has updated the original pattern, which the fundamentalists denounce.

In 1923, a letter from church president Heber J. Grant to stake and temple presidents, stated that after careful and prayerful consideration the First Presidency and Quorum of the Twelve Apostles of the LDS Church had unanimously decided that specific modifications would be permitted to the garments: sleeves could end at the elbow; legs could be shortened to just below the knee; and buttons could be used instead of strings. The collar was eliminated and the open crotch closed. Other changes were made after 1923 which shortened the sleeves and legs further and eliminated buttons.

In the 1930s, the LDS Church built Beehive Clothing Mills, which was responsible for manufacturing and selling garments. This led to a more standardized design. During this time women's garments were one-piece designs that ended just above the knees and had a cap sleeve. In 1979, the First Presidency announced two-piece garments becoming available in February 1980 and members generally accepted the change. Today, garments are made in both styles with a variety of different fabrics. Feminine styles are sold with either a rounded or a sweetheart neckline with cap sleeves, with sweetheart necklines usually following the line of the bra. There are also two styles of necklines for men.

Endowed church members can purchase garments through church distribution centers worldwide, through the mail, and online. They are sold at a moderate price that is assumed to be near cost. To purchase temple garments, members must have received their temple endowment. To purchase garments online, they must provide their membership record number. Endowed members can find their membership record number on their temple recommend or by obtaining a copy of their Individual Ordinance Summary.

As late as 1977, church members were instructed they could make their own garments with the approval of their local leaders. As of 2010, the official documentation of church institutional policies known as Handbook 2: Administering the Church states that, of both garments and temple clothing in general, only temple aprons may be hand made, and only then using "the approved apron embroidery and sewing kit that is available through Church Distribution Services."

In the 21st century, the church has further updated and made changes to the temple garments for men and women. This has included basic changes in manufacturing to make the garments more wearable and changes to fabric, such as incorporating spandex for a tighter fit. In 2021, the lace at the hem of the women's garment was removed. In 2024, a large change was announced to the cut of both men's and women's garment, which included the removal of the sleeves for certain hot climates. This change has been celebrated by women in the church in the hope that it makes the garments more suitable to modern needs and less restrictive, but some still see it as an attempt to control what women are allowed to wear.

== LDS Church teachings ==
In the church's General Handbook, leaders are instructed to tell members they should wear garments throughout their lives, and that they should not alter them. In the temple recommend interview, members are asked if they wear the garment as instructed in the temple. Members are told that they should not partially or completely remove any portion of the garment to participate in activities that can "reasonably be done with the garment worn properly beneath the clothing".

Garment wearers are also instructed that they should not adjust garments or wear them in a way that would accommodate the wearing certain styles of clothing. This includes uncovering areas of the body that would normally be covered by the garment, such as the shoulders and lower thighs. Prior to the disposal of old garments, members are instructed to cut out the markings on them.

== Biblical references and LDS scholarship ==
The temple garment is usually identified by Mormon scholars with the sacred "linen breeches" (michnasayim/mikhnesei bahd) and the "coat of linen" (kuttoneth) that ancient Israelite priests were commanded to wear, as referenced in Exodus 28:39-43.

Additionally, the temple garment has been compared to the modern tallit katan, a sacred undershirt of Orthodox and ultra-Orthodox Judaism. Both the temple garment and the tallit katan are meant to be worn all day under regular clothing as a constant reminder of the covenants, promises, and obligations the wearer is under.

== Use in protests ==
Some church opponents have used public occasions, like the biannual church conferences, to publicly mock and parody the wearing of temple garments. During the October 2003 LDS Church General Conference, some anti-Mormon demonstrators outside the LDS Conference Center reportedly spat and stomped on garments in view of those attending the conference. A scuffle broke out between a protester and two members of the church who attempted to take the garments from him. To avoid a repeat of the conflict, the municipality of Salt Lake City used new protest buffer zones for the April 2004 conference.

== See also ==
- Christian head covering
- Cilice – Coarse garment important to Christianity, worn for penance
- Head covering for Jewish women – Wig or half-wig worn by some married Orthodox Jewish women
- Hijab – Islamic head covering for women
- Kacchera – Sikh religious undergarment
- Sedreh – Undergarment worn by Zoroastrians
- Tallit katan - a Jewish undergarment
