= Washing and anointing =

Temple ordinance practice in Mormonism

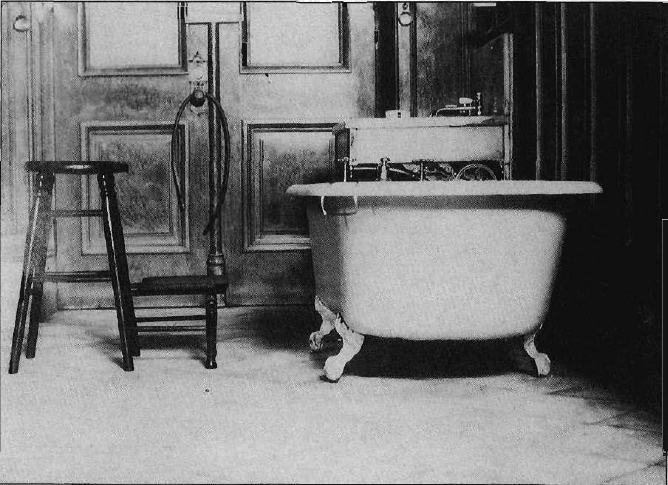
One of ten washing and anointing rooms of the Salt Lake Temple of the Church of Jesus Christ of Latter-day Saints circa 1911.

Washing and anointing is a Latter-day Saint practice of ritual purification. It is a key part of the temple endowment ceremony as well as the Second Anointing ceremony practiced by the Church of Jesus Christ of Latter-day Saints (LDS Church) and Mormon fundamentalists. It was also part of the female-only healing rituals among Latter-day Saints until at least the 1940s.

In preparation for the temple endowment, a person, generally over the age of 18, is sprinkled with water, then anointed with perfume or oil as a cleansing before God. Once washed and anointed, the participant is dressed in the temple garment, a symbolic white undergarment. The ordinance performed by the authority of the Melchizedek priesthood, and by an officiator of the same sex as the participant, is "mostly symbolic in nature, but promis[es] definite, immediate blessings as well as future blessings," contingent upon continued righteous living. These ordinances of washing and anointing are referred to often in the temple as "initiatory ordinances" since they precede the endowment and sealing ordinances.

Like other temple ordinances, washings and anointings are also conducted on behalf of deceased individuals as a type of "vicarious ordinance".

The LDS Church states the origins of these rituals can be traced back to the biblical period, where anointings were used to sanctify individuals and objects, while washings were used for ritual purification. The LDS Church introduced washings and anointings in the Kirtland Temple in 1836, before revising the rituals in Nauvoo, Illinois in 1842. The modern LDS Church only performs these rites in temples set apart and dedicated for sacred purposes according to a January 19, 1841 revelation that Joseph Smith stated was from Jesus Christ.

Washing and anointing also plays a key role in the Second Anointing ritual practiced by the LDS Church, in which participants are anointed as a "priest and king" or a "priestess and queen", and are sealed to the highest degree of salvation in LDS theology. This is the most secretive ritual practiced by Latter-day Saints, and most church members are unaware of its existence.

== History ==
=== Old Testament period ===
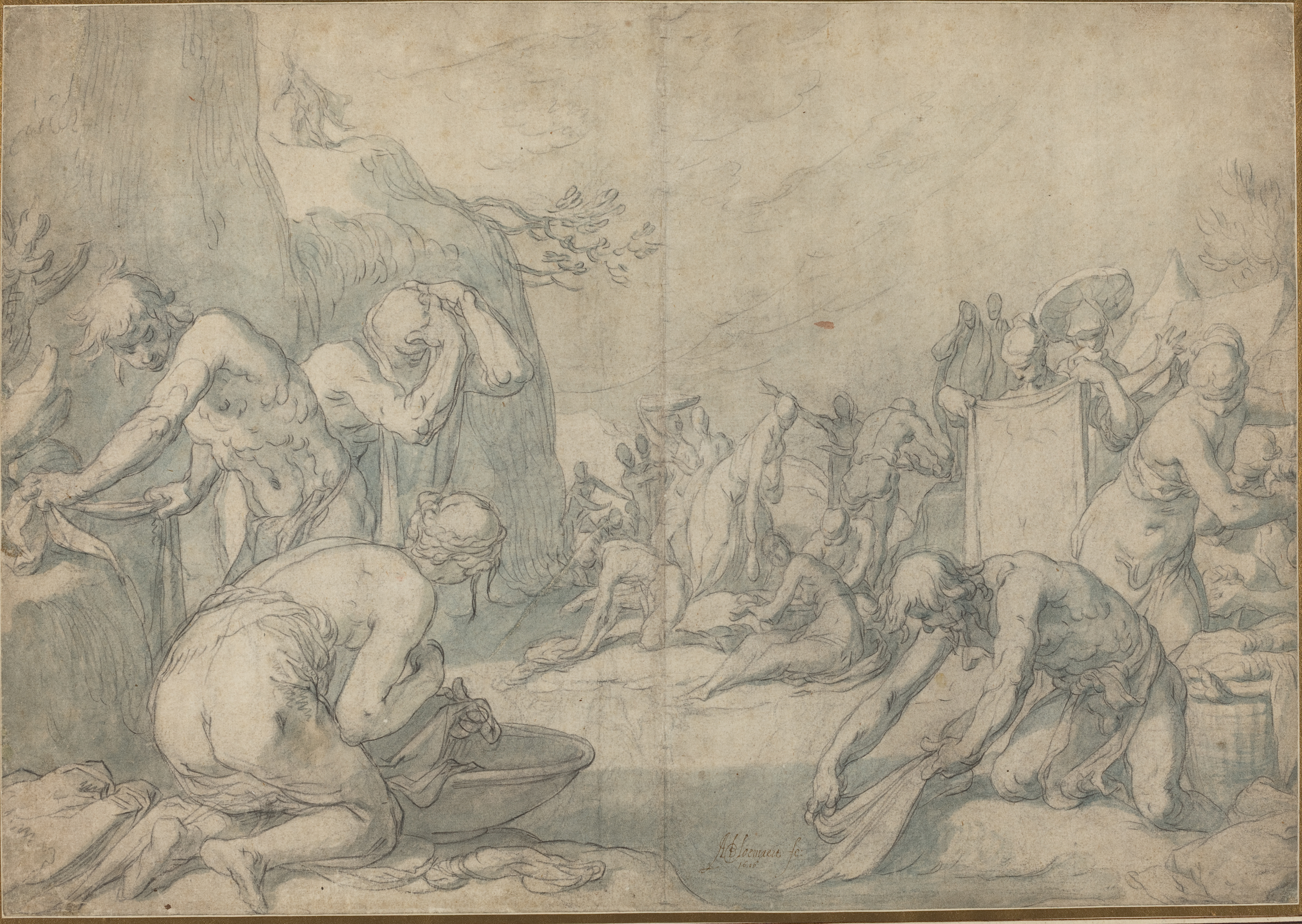
Abraham Bloemaert, Ritual Washing of the Israelites, 1606, NGA 56692

Ritual anointings were a prominent part of religious rites in the biblical world. Recipients of the anointing included temple officiants (e.g., Aaron), prophets (e.g., Elisha), and kings (e.g., Jehu, Solomon). In addition, sacral objects associated with the Israelite sanctuary were anointed. Of equal importance in the religion of the Israelites were ablutions (ceremonial washings). To ensure religious purity, Mosaic law required that designated individuals receive a ritual washing, sometimes in preparation for entering the temple.

=== New Testament period ===
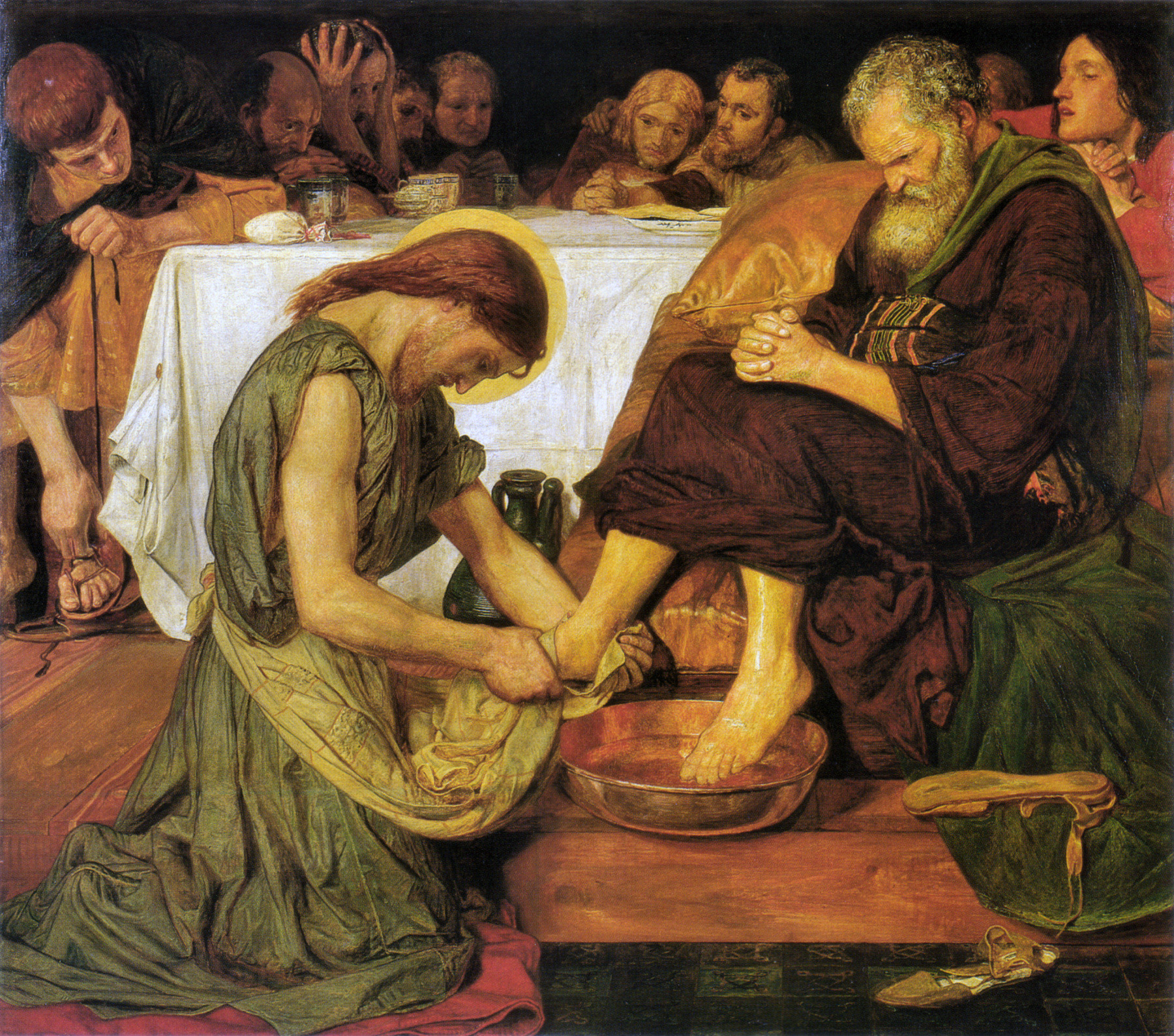
Jesus washing Peter's feet. Painted by Ford Madox Brown.

In the New Testament Jesus washes his disciples' feet prior to his crucifixion. Joseph Smith published his own version of these New Testament passages, adding new materials which said, "Now this was the custom of the Jews under their law; wherefore, Jesus did this that the law might be fulfilled."

Cleansing rituals such as tevilah and netilat yadayim have existed in Judaism for millennia. However, rabbinical scholars argue that these rituals served the purpose of removing impurity after activities that would make one "impure" such having contact with a corpse, or bodily discharge of a sick person.

Smith's claim that the foot-washing was part of Jewish "law" is not supported by historical sources.

=== Kirtland period ===
As the Latter Day Saints were completing their first temple in Kirtland, Ohio, founder Joseph Smith led many of the prominent male church members in a pre-endowment ritual patterned after similar washings and anointings described in the Bible. This ritual took place over several days, beginning on 21 January 1836 in the attic of a printing office.

These ritual meetings were opened by Joseph Smith praying, speaking, and even singing in tongues. Each participant washed their own hands, faces, and feet with water. After this, Joseph "girded himself with a towel" and personally washed the feet of each participant, wiping them with the towel. When he reached his father Joseph Smith Sr., he asked his father for a blessing before he would wash his father's feet. Smith Sr. placed his hands upon Joseph's head, "pronouncing upon his head that he should continue in his Priests office untill Christ come."

Soon after the temple's dedication on 27 March 1836, about 300 Latter Day Saint men participated in a further ritual washing of feet and faces.

=== Nauvoo period ===
Several years later, after Latter Day Saints moved to Nauvoo, Illinois, Smith revised the washing and anointing rituals as part of the new Nauvoo endowment. On 4–5 May 1842, nine prominent male church members were inducted into this endowment ceremony in the upper story of Smith's store. The first woman (Smith's first wife, Emma) was inducted into the endowment ceremony on 28 September 1843.

As the washings and anointings were practiced in Nauvoo, men and women were taken to separate rooms, where they disrobed and, when called upon, passed through a canvas curtain to enter a tub where they were washed from head to foot while words of blessing were recited. Then oil from a horn was poured over the head of the participant, usually by another officiator, while similar words were repeated. As part of the ceremony, participants were ordained to become kings and queens in eternity. Men performed the ritual for men, and women performed the ritual for women. Also, as part of the ceremony, participants were given a new name and a ritual undergarment in which symbolic marks were snipped into the fabric.

=== Early-Utah period ===
After the Latter Day Saints left Nauvoo, women continued to administer washings and anointings in their homes as well as in temples. The in-home rituals were part of a practice of administering to the sick. These washings and anointings were encouraged by church leaders of the time including Brigham Young. In one instance Ezra T. Benson called on women who were ordained to wash and anoint to get rid of a disease affecting the Cache Valley. This practice of washing and anointing in the home was curtailed in the 1880s and by the April 1921 general conference, the consensus was that blessings performed by Melchizedek Priesthood holders should be sought whenever possible. In 1946, Joseph Fielding Smith sent a letter to Belle S. Spafford saying these washings and anointings were discouraged.

== Use in LDS female healing rituals ==
Historically, Latter-day Saint women performed special washings and anointings to heal the sick and afflicted. Joseph Smith officially sanctioned female healing in 1842. This practice continued in the LDS Church until at least the 1940s. A sick person was washed, anointed with oil, and given a priesthood blessing by the "laying on of hands".

One of the first recorded female healings took place at the Relief Society meeting on April 19, 1842. Sarah Cleveland and Elizabeth Ann Whitney, who were counselors in the Relief Society Presidency, administered to Abigale Leonard "for the restoration of health." Minute notes also indicate that Sister Martha Sessions may have laid her hands on Eliza R. Snow to give her a blessing during this meeting.

In the following Relief Society meeting, on April 28, 1842, Joseph Smith said that anyone who has faith can give priesthood blessings to heal the sick. Smith said that God had sanctioned female healing by the laying on of hands and that anyone who disagreed should "hold their tongues."

Brigham Young and Ezra T. Benson encouraged women to perform these healing rituals at home. However, by the April 1921 general conference the consensus was that healings should only be performed by Melchizedek Priesthood holders (who are exclusively male).

In 1946, Joseph Fielding Smith sent a letter to Belle S. Spafford, the General Relief Society President at the time, discouraging the practice of female healing, indicating that it was likely still happening at this time.

== Administration ==
In response to a commandment to gather the saints and to build a house "to prepare them for the ordinances and endowments, washings, and anointings", these ordinances were introduced in the Kirtland Temple on January 21, 1836. These modern rites are now only performed for LDS Church members in temples set apart and dedicated for sacred purposes, according to a January 19, 1841 revelation that Joseph Smith stated was from Jesus Christ.

== Symbolic interpretations ==
Many symbolic meanings of washings and anointings are traceable in the scriptures. Ritual washings (Heb. 9:10) symbolize the cleansing of the soul from sins and iniquities. They signify the washing-away of the pollutions of the Lord's people (Isa. 4:4). Psalm 51:2 expresses the human longing and divine promise: "Wash me thoroughly from mine iniquity, and cleanse me from my sin". The anointing of a person or object with sacred ointment represents sanctification and consecration, so that both become "most holy" unto the Lord. In this manner, profane persons and things are sanctified in similitude of the messiah (Hebrew "anointed one"), who is Christ (Greek "anointed one").

== See also ==
- Anointed Quorum
- Second anointing
