= Prayer circle (Mormonism) =

Latter-day Saint sacred ritual

In Mormonism, a prayer circle, also known as the true order of prayer, is a ritual established by Joseph Smith that some Mormons believe is a more potent method of prayer that can lead to receiving greater blessings and revelation from God. The ritual involves forming a circle of participants around a person who offers a prayer, usually at an altar in a Temple. The members of the circle repeat the words of the prayer.

Mormon prayer circles were once organized by local congregations on a monthly schedule, but in the late 1970s were restricted only to temples.

== Origin ==
Prayer circles were common in the Protestant revivals of the Second Great Awakening that Smith or other early LDS leaders likely witnessed or engaged in. Ritual circles were also practiced in Freemasonry, to which Smith had been initiated in 1842 by Abraham Jonas. Early Mormons may have practiced Protestant-type prayer circles at least as early as 1833 during the early phase of School of the Prophets, according to Zebedee Coltrin's recollection.

On May 4, 1842, Smith met with nine other men and performed the first endowment ceremony. It is not clear whether this ceremony included a prayer circle. However, prayer circles became the main purpose of meetings of the Anointed Quorum beginning on May 26, 1843. Women were first included in the ceremony on September 28, 1843.

== In the Church of Jesus Christ of Latter-day Saints ==
After Smith's death in 1844, the Church of Jesus Christ of Latter-day Saints (LDS Church) continued to practice prayer circles in its temples. In addition, local stake and ward prayer circles were organized and conducted until May 3, 1978, when the church's First Presidency announced that all prayer circles should be discontinued except those performed in a temple as part of the endowment. The reason for this change is not known, but could have resulted in part from the growth of the LDS Church, and the fact that prayer circles were usually organized by a member of the First Presidency or the Quorum of the Twelve Apostles. Only members who had received the endowment could participate in prayer circles outside of the temple.

LDS Church prayer circles were described in Sunstone magazine:

Dressed in temple clothing, circle members sang, prayed, bore testimonies, and listened to brief sermons. Led by the stake president, the group would then stand together in a large circle and rehearse parts of the endowment ceremony. A prayer roll would be placed on an altar and a prayer would be offered in behalf of the stake's needy and afflicted.

== Within Mormon fundamentalism ==
Amongst some Mormon fundamentalists, such as the Apostolic United Brethren, prayer circles within temples, endowment houses, and homes are still common.

== See also ==
- Prayer in Mormonism
