= Mormon temple controversies =

In the Latter Day Saint movement, also called Mormonism, a temple is a building dedicated to being a house of God and is reserved for special forms and rites of worship. Practices surrounding the temple and worship inside have long attracted criticism and controversy. In particular, the Church of Jesus Christ of Latter-day Saints (LDS Church), by far the largest extant denomination of the movement, has experienced significant controversy regarding its temples and worship practices within them.

== Restrictions on entrance ==
Richard and Joan Ostling, and Hugh F. Pyle state that the LDS Church's policy on temple admission is unreasonable, noting that even relatives cannot attend a temple marriage unless they are members of the church in good standing. The Ostlings, the Institute for Religious Research, and Jerald and Sandra Tanner say that the admission rules are unreasonable because admission to the temple requires that a church member must first declare that they pay their full tithe before they can enter a temple. The Mormonism Research Ministry calls this "coerced tithing" because church members that do not pay the full tithe cannot enter the temple and thus cannot receive the ordinances required to receive the highest order of exaltation in the next life.

Temple ordinances have historically been unavailable to some members. For about 130 years (between 1847 and 1978) all LDS endowment-related temple ordinances were denied to all Black people in a controversial race-based policy. As of 2023, all temple ordinances are unavailable to lesbian, gay, or bisexual people who are in a same-sex marriage or homosexual sexual relationship and to all transgender individuals who are transitioning or have transitioned. These restrictions have also garnered criticism from both outside, and inside the LDS church.

== Baptism for the dead ==
The church teaches that a living person, acting as proxy, can be baptized by immersion on behalf of a deceased person. Floyd C. McElveen and the Institute for Religious Research state that verses to support baptism for the dead are not justified by contextual exegesis of the Bible. In 2008, the Vatican issued a statement calling the practice "erroneous" and directing its dioceses to keep parish records from the Genealogical Society of Utah which is affiliated with the LDS Church.

Some Jewish groups criticized the LDS Church in 1995 after discovering that vicarious baptisms for the dead for victims of the Holocaust had been performed by members of the church. After that criticism, church leaders put a policy in place to stop the practice, with an exception for baptisms specifically requested or approved by victims' relatives. Jewish organizations again criticized the church in 2002, 2004, 2008, and 2012 stating that the church failed to honor the 1995 agreement. The LDS Church says it has put institutional safeguards in place to avoid the submission of the names of Holocaust victims not related to Mormon members, but the sheer number of names submitted makes policing the database of names impractical.

== Endowment ceremony ==
Jerald and Sandra Tanner allege that Joseph Smith copied parts of the Mormon temple endowment ceremony from Masonic rituals (such as secret handshakes, clothing, and passwords), and that this undermines the church's statement that the rituals were divinely inspired. The Tanners also point to the fact that Joseph Smith was himself a Freemason prior to introducing the endowment rituals into Mormonism.

The Tanners criticize the church's revision of the temple endowment ceremony over the years, saying that revisions were made to obscure provocative practices of the early church.

FAIR, a Latter-day Saint apologetic organization, acknowledges changes to the endowment ceremony and points out that (according to Joseph Fielding Smith) Joseph Smith told Brigham Young the ceremony was "not arranged perfectly" and challenged him to organize and systemize it, which Young continued to do throughout his presidency, though how this instruction relates to more modern changes is unclear.

== Spire heights and local zoning controversies ==
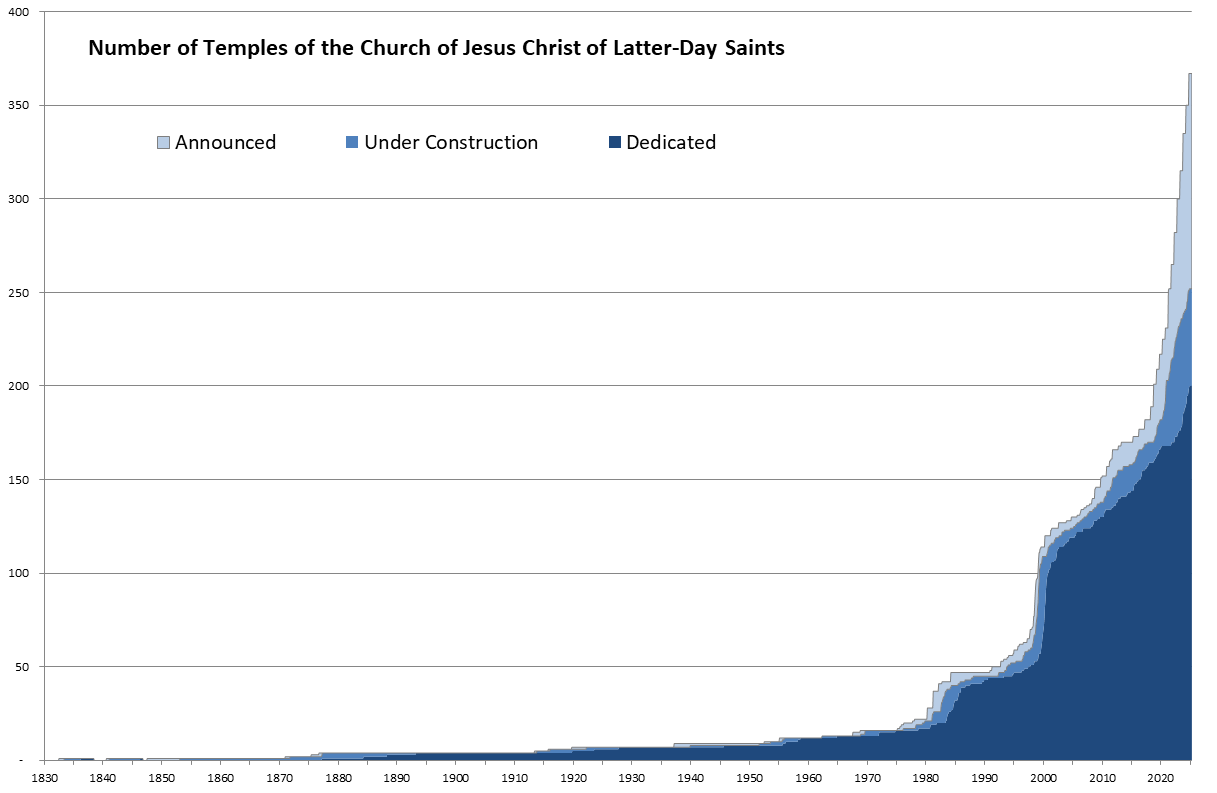
Chart of temple construction as of November 2024

Disputes over the height, light pollution, and traffic congestion of temples has increased as the LDS Church plans and begins construction on increasing numbers of temples.

The temple in Cody, Wyoming was opposed by local residents due to its location in a residential area, its 101-foot spire, and its 24-hour bright exterior lighting. In 2024, a residents' group sued to halt temple construction, but the courts sided with the church.

In 2024 and 2025, a planned temple in Fairview, Texas became the point of controversy for similar reasons. Original plans had called for a 173-foot steeple in a residential zone. The city's standard residential height limit is 35 feet; no separate zoning ordinances exist for buildings of different types. Eventually, city officials gave approval for a temple with a 120-foot spire; the mayor stated "we were worried about being sued [by the LDS Church if the temple was not approved.] ... The cost of paying for our lawyers and the staff time would be just outrageous for us."

Other similar disputes have occurred over planned temple sites in Heber City, Utah; Tucson, Arizona; and Lone Mountain, Nevada.

== Fundamentalist groups ==
In 2017, the Fundamentalist Church of Jesus Christ of Latter Day Saints (FLDS Church) was accused of ritualistic sex abuse and rape in its temples, on altar-like beds. Similar allegations had been raised in 2008.

== See also ==
- List of temples of The Church of Jesus Christ of Latter-day Saints
- Timeline of changes to temple ceremonies in the Church of Jesus Christ of Latter-day Saints
- Good Neighbor policy (LDS Church)
- Penalty (Mormonism)
- Second anointing#Controversy and criticism
