= The Church of Jesus Christ of Latter-day Saints in Sweden =

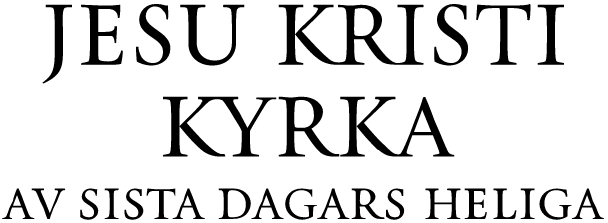
- (Logo in Swedish)

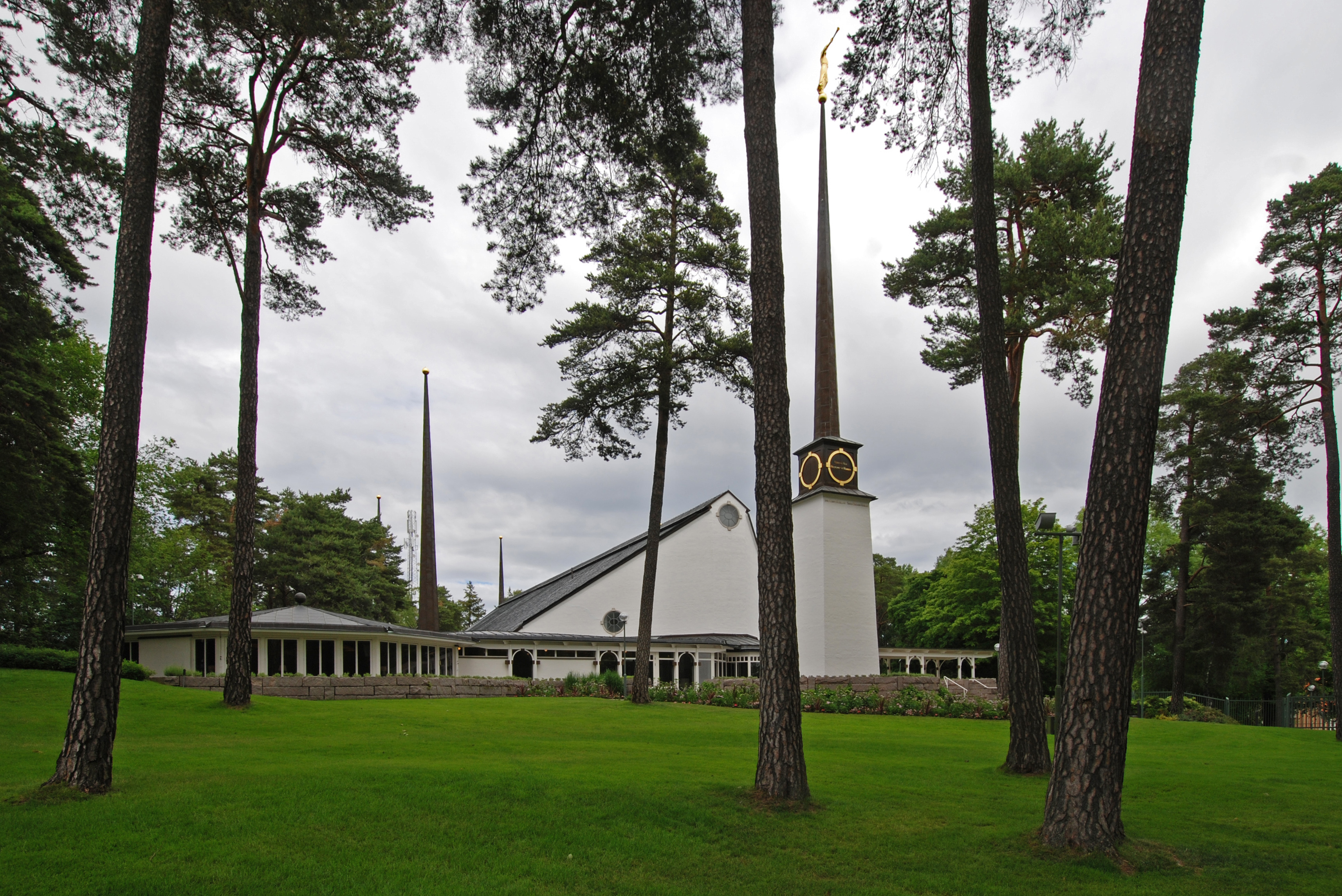
- The Stockholm Sweden Temple
- Area: Europe North
- Members: 9,569 (2025)
- Stakes: 4
- Districts: 1
- Wards: 25
- Branches: 13
- Total Congregations: 38
- Missions: 1
- Temples: 1 operating
- FamilySearch Centers: 38

The Church of Jesus Christ of Latter-day Saints (LDS Church) (Swedish: Jesu Kristi Kyrka av Sista Dagars Heliga), headquartered in Salt Lake City, Utah, has been in Sweden since 1850.

== History ==
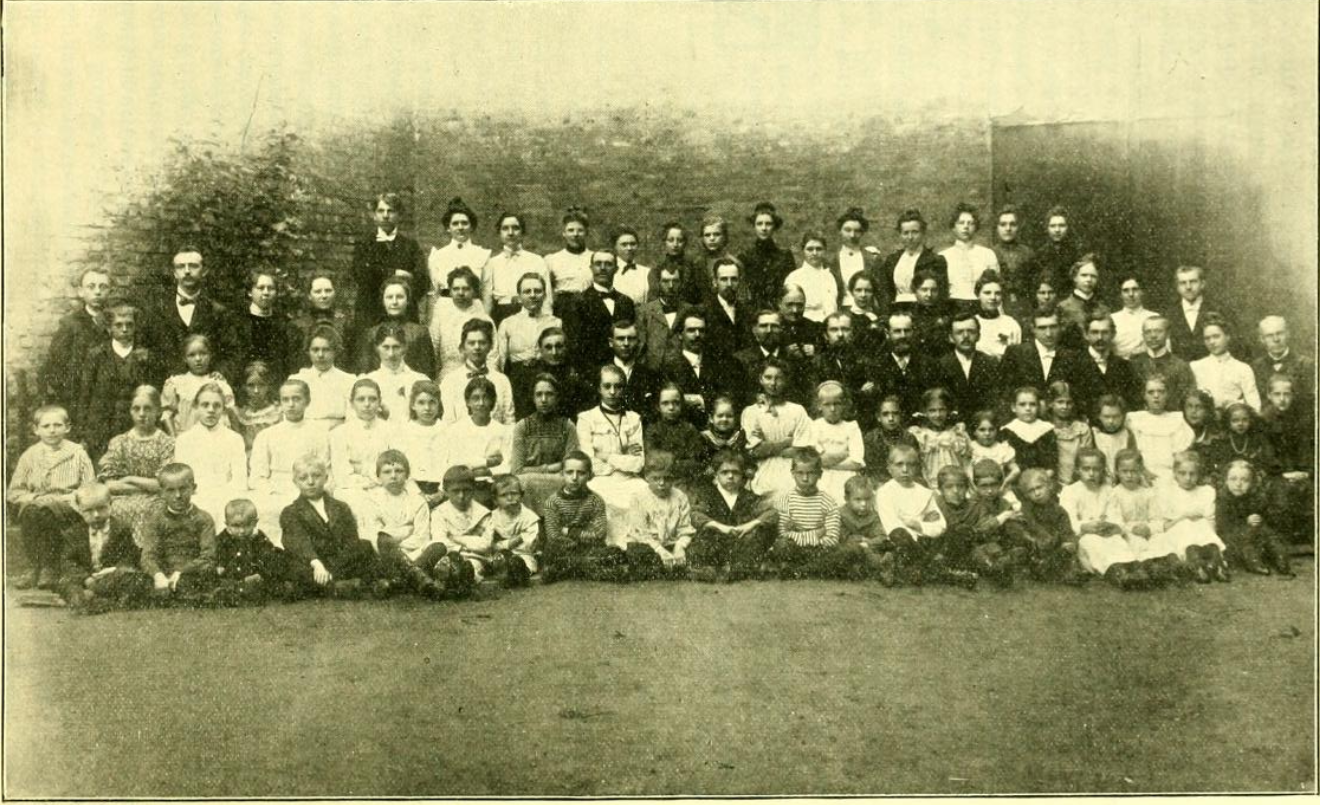
Sunday School in Oslo ca 1902

Membership
Year	Members
1930	1,854
1940	1,614
1950	1,483
1960	2,569
1970	4,722
1980	6,888
1989*	7,700
1999	8,587
2009	8,966
2019	9,649
2025	9,569
*Membership was published as an estimate or rounded number. Source: Windall J. Ashton; Jim M. Wall, Deseret News, various years, Church Almanac Country Information: Sweden

The Book of Mormon was translated into Swedish in 1878. As with many other Scandinavian converts, Swedish LDS were encouraged to emigrate to the US and build up "Zion" there; these included the ancestors of a previous church president, Thomas S. Monson, whose grandfather, Nels Monson (born Torhamn), emigrated at the age of 16. This depleted local numbers for a number of decades, until in the late twentieth century, this policy was discontinued, and a temple built within the country itself.

As of 2021, the LDS Church counted its number of members in Sweden to be just above 9,528, divided into 5 regional units with a total of 40 congregations. This was an increase in membership from 2014, which was 9,463. The Church also maintains one temple in the country, the Stockholm Sweden Temple, in Västerhaninge.

=== The Swedish Rescue ===
Around 2010, a number of Swedish members of the LDS Church, including former area seventy Hans Mattsson, began to doubt the veracity of the church. Marlin K. Jensen, a church general authority, and historian Richard E. Turley Jr. soon after conducted a fireside, an informal church meeting, at the Västerhaninge Chapel in Stockholm, Sweden, on November 28, 2010. The audio was surreptitiously recorded and sparked much discussion and interest in the blogosphere.

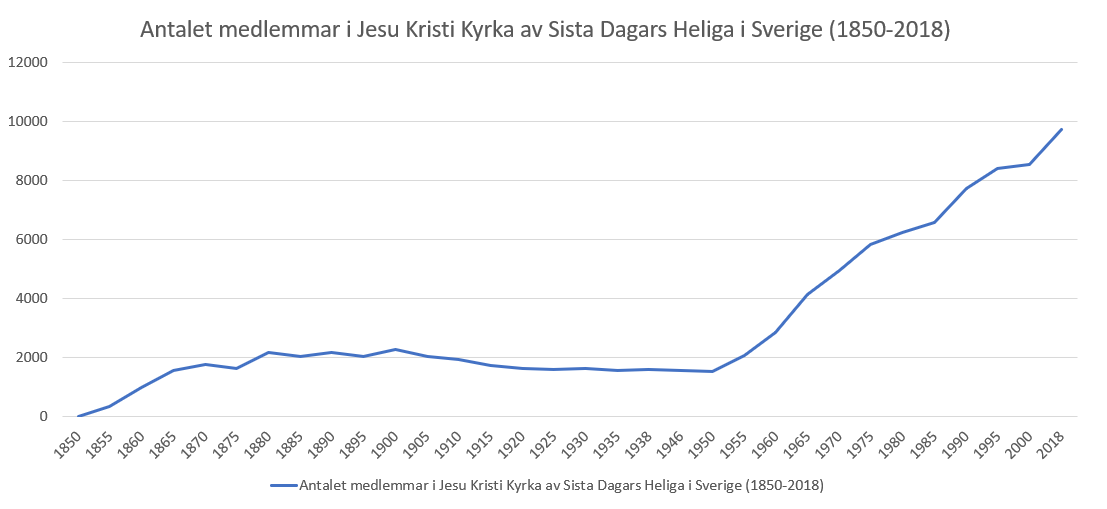
Membership history of the LDS Church in Sweden

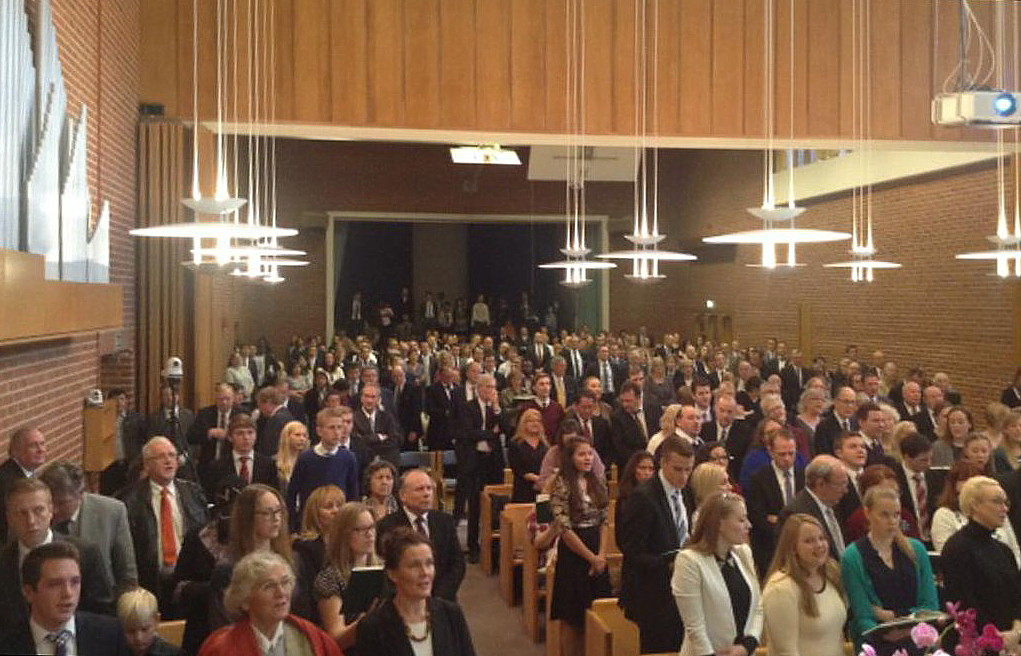
Service in Gubbängen in 2015

== Stakes ==
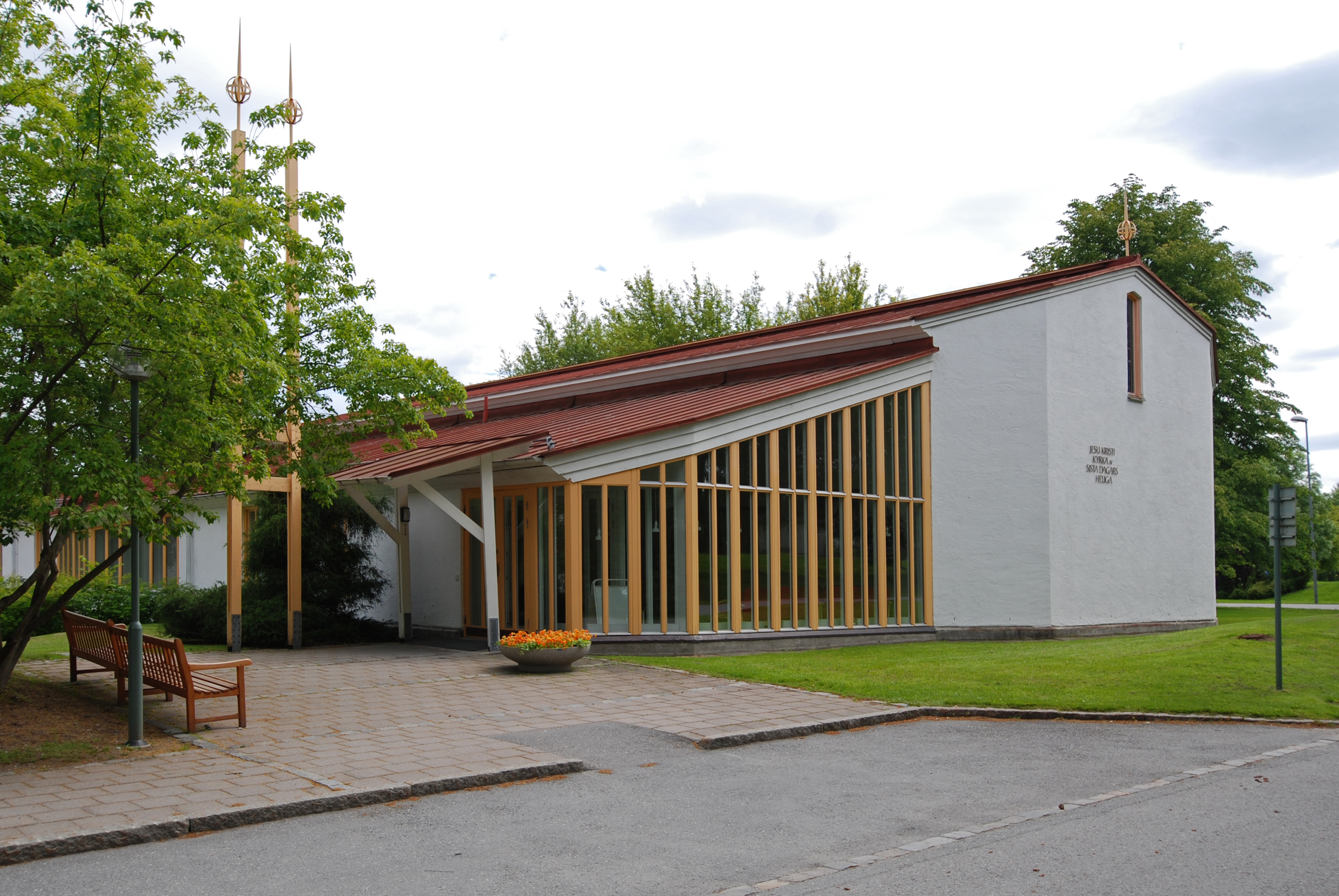
A meetinghouse next to the Stockholm Sweden Temple

As of May 2026, the following stakes were located in Sweden:

Stake	Organized	Temple
Göteborg Sweden Stake	20 Nov 1977	Stockholm Sweden
Malmö Sweden Stake	1 Sep 1996	Copenhagen Denmark
Stockholm Sweden Stake	20 Apr 1975	Stockholm Sweden
Stockholm Sweden South Stake	20 Aug 1995	Stockholm Sweden
Umeå Sweden District	1 Jan 1960	Stockholm Sweden

== Missions ==
- Sweden Stockholm Mission: On June 15, 1905, the Swedish Mission was organized from the Scandinavian Mission, which was renamed the Danish-Norwegian Mission. When established, the mission covered Sweden, Finland, Russia and northern Germany, with Petter Matson as its president. It has since been split among other missions, reducing the area of the mission to only Sweden.

== Temples ==
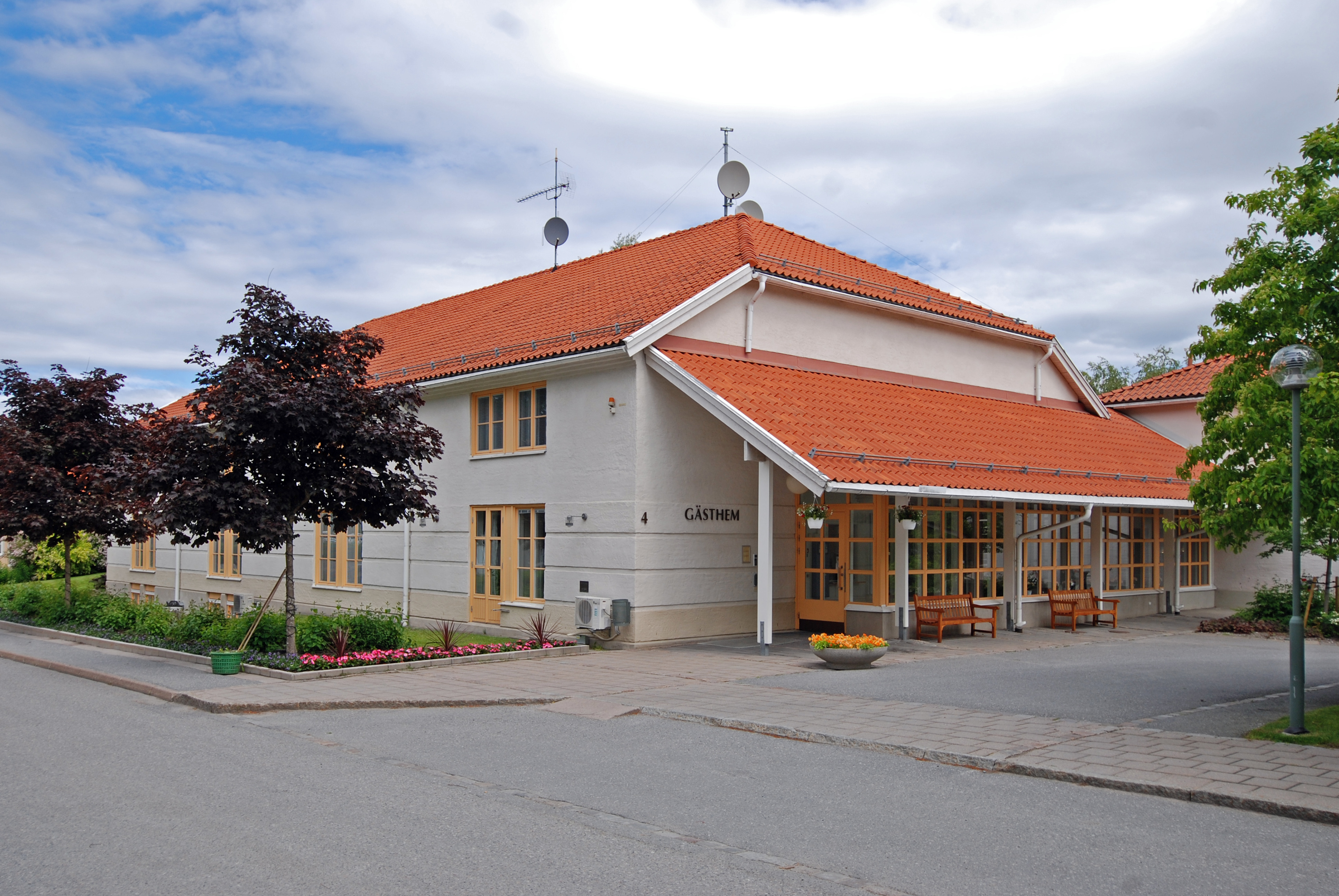
A guest house for the Stockholm Sweden Temple

34. Stockholm Sweden Temple (Closed for renovation); Official website; News & images	
Location: Announced: Groundbreaking: Dedicated: Size: Style:	Västerhaninge, Sweden; 1 April 1981 by Spencer W. Kimball; 17 March 1984 by Thomas S. Monson; 2 July 1985 by Gordon B. Hinckley; 31,000 sq ft (2,900 m^{2}) on a 4.47-acre (1.81 ha) site Modern adaptation of six-spire design - designed by John Sjostrom and Church A&E Services

== See also ==
- Religion in Sweden
