= Stockholm Sweden Temple =

Temple in Sweden operated by The Church of Jesus Christ of Latter-day Saints

- Closed for renovation
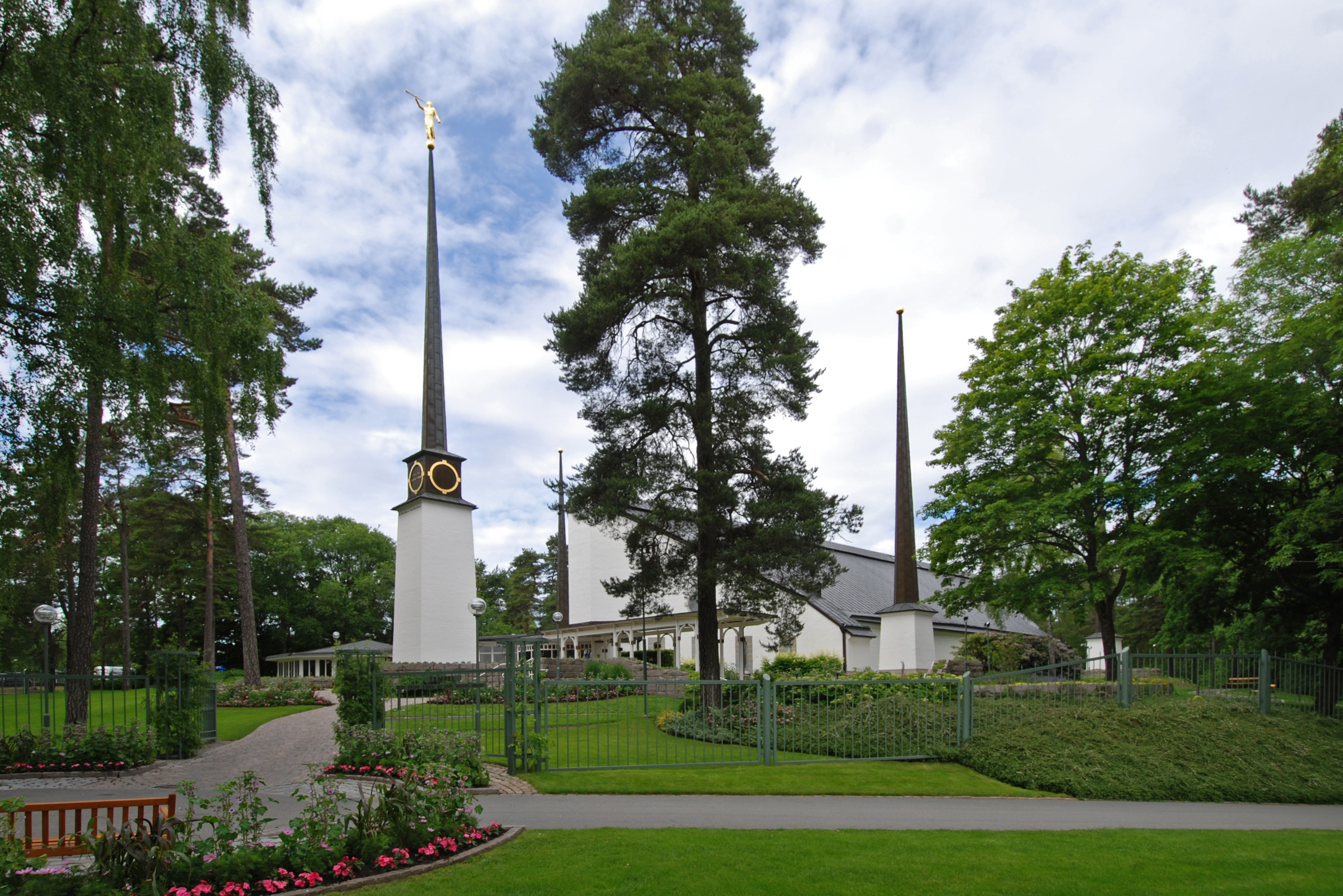
- The temple in June 2017.
- Interactive map of Stockholm Sweden Temple
- Number: 34
- Dedication: 2 July 1985, by Gordon B. Hinckley
- Site: 4.47 acres (1.81 ha)
- Floor area: 31,000 ft^{2} (2,900 m^{2})
- Height: 112 ft (34 m)
- Official website • News & images

Church chronology
← Freiberg Germany Temple	Stockholm Sweden Temple	→ Chicago Illinois Temple

Additional information
- Announced: 1 April 1981, by Spencer W. Kimball
- Groundbreaking: 17 March 1984, by Thomas S. Monson
- Open house: 10–22 June 1985
- Designed by: John Sjostrom and Church A&E Services
- Location: Västerhaninge, Sweden
- Coordinates: 59°7′28.83360″N 18°6′33.03719″E
- Exterior finish: Masonry exterior with copper roof
- Design: Modern adaptation of six-spire design
- Baptistries: 1
- Ordinance rooms: 4 (stationary)
- Sealing rooms: 3
- Clothing rental: Yes

The Stockholm Sweden Temple (Swedish: Templet i Stockholm) is a temple of the Church of Jesus Christ of Latter-day Saints in Västerhaninge, a suburb south of Stockholm, Sweden. Opened in 1985, it became the church's first temple in Scandinavia, and the 34th in operation worldwide. Following years of frost-inflicted damage to the structure, the temple was closed in 2023 and subsequently demolished. As of 2024, a new temple structure is currently being constructed on the same site. Prior to its closure, the temple was serving members in Sweden, Norway, and Latvia.

Swedish architect John Sjöström collaborated with the church's architectural staff to design the original temple, which included six spires, a masonry exterior, and a copper roof, with a gold-leafed statue of the angel Moroni atop the tallest spire. 16,366 square feet (1,520.5 m^{2}) of space inside the temple featured four ordinance rooms, three sealing rooms, and a baptistry. The reconstructed temple is to be of similar design, although its size will be increased to approximately 31,000 square feet (2,900 m^{2}).

The 4.47-acre (1.81 ha) wooded site also features a guesthouse for patrons, and includes a portion of the Åby Grave Field, where archaeological excavations prior to construction of the temple uncovered hundreds of Iron Age graves.

== History ==
Church president Spencer W. Kimball announced construction of the temple on 1 April 1981, during a press conference at Temple Square. Following the announcement, a local committee made visits to 17 communities (all located within 30 minutes travel time by rail from Stockholm) to explore potential sites for the temple. The committee then made a recommendation of two locations to the church's First Presidency, which selected the site at Västerhaninge in Haninge Municipality, 13 miles (21 km) south of Stockholm. Local residents generally welcomed the temple project, changing the name of the street on which the temple would be located to Tempelvägen ("The Temple Road") and renaming three of the city blocks as the "Temple," the "Genealogist" and the "Chapel."

A groundbreaking ceremony took place on 17 March 1984, presided over by Thomas S. Monson of the Quorum of the Twelve Apostles. Following construction, a public open house was held from 10–22 June 1985, with approximately 47,000 attending. This exceeded expectations and resulted in more than 1,200 referrals from those wanting to learn more about the church.

Prior to its dedication, Lutheran Bishop Krister Stendahl toured the building and reflected in a Swedish newspaper that "to experience their joy and pride over the beauty of the temple warms one's heart." He described it as a place built "to the glory of God" and rejoiced with church members over their new house of worship.

The temple was dedicated by Gordon B. Hinckley during 11 sessions held 2–4 July 1985. Four of the dedicatory sessions were translated into Swedish, three into Finnish, two into Norwegian and two into Danish. During the first session, Hinckley described the event as the most significant day in the history of the church in Scandinavia. To celebrate the dedication, the Swedish postal service issued a special commemorative stamp cancellation featuring the angel Moroni, available in a postal trailer parked near the temple.

On 29 July 1988, a bomb exploded outside a side door at the temple, causing minor damage but no injuries. Local authorities stated footprints at the site indicated several people planted the bomb, perhaps juveniles.

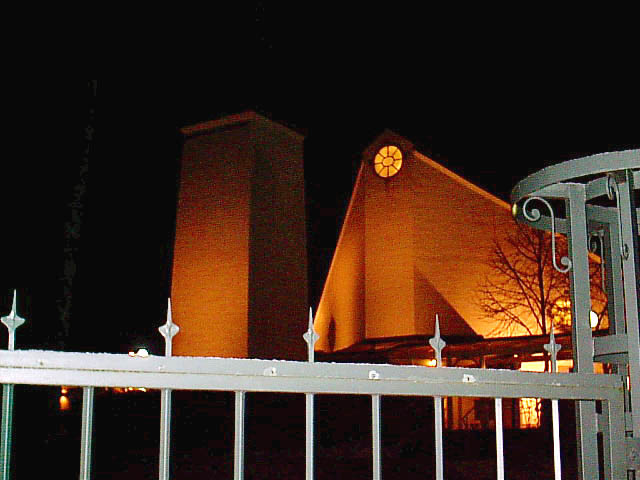
The temple in February 2003

On 23 August 1995, the temple grounds were visited by King Carl XVI Gustaf and Queen Silvia as part of a modern Eriksgata, a royal tour based on a 13th century tradition. Church members, missionaries, Boy Scouts and Young Women lined the walkway, singing and waving flags, as Thomas S. Monson and local church leaders led the royal couple around the site. During the visit, Monson presented gifts to the king and queen, including a family history to Queen Silvia. He also commented on the love of scouting that both him and the king shared, with the two being prior recipients of the Bronze Wolf Award. A plaque on the temple grounds commemorates this event.

=== 2020s replacement ===
In September 2022, the church announced the temple would close the following year to allow for extensive renovations and reconstruction, which would nearly double the temple's square footage. Temple operations shut down beginning 26 March 2023.

While preparing to renovate the temple, the church discovered several issues with the structure that could not be repaired, most notably, its foundation was not constructed below the frost line and heaving over the decades had caused cracking. This resulted in replacing, rather than simply renovating the building. Demolition of the original temple began in earnest in January 2024.

== Design and architecture ==
The original temple was designed by Swedish architect John Sjöström, in collaboration with the church's architectural department, who worked to harmonize its exterior with the historic architecture of the area. The structure included an adaptation of the church's six-spire design, with the tallest spire rising to 112 feet (34 m) and featuring a gold-leafed angel Moroni statue at its top. The exterior walls were finished in masonry, with a copper roof, and a cobblestone path led to the temple's front entrance. Inside the temple's 16,366 square feet (1,520.5 m^{2}) were four ordinance rooms, three sealing rooms, and a baptistry.

The reconstructed temple will be of similar design, with two ordinance rooms inside. The structure will be slightly longer and wider than the original, and a basement will be included with space for mechanical and workshop areas; this will increase its size to approximately 31,000 square feet (2,900 m^{2}).

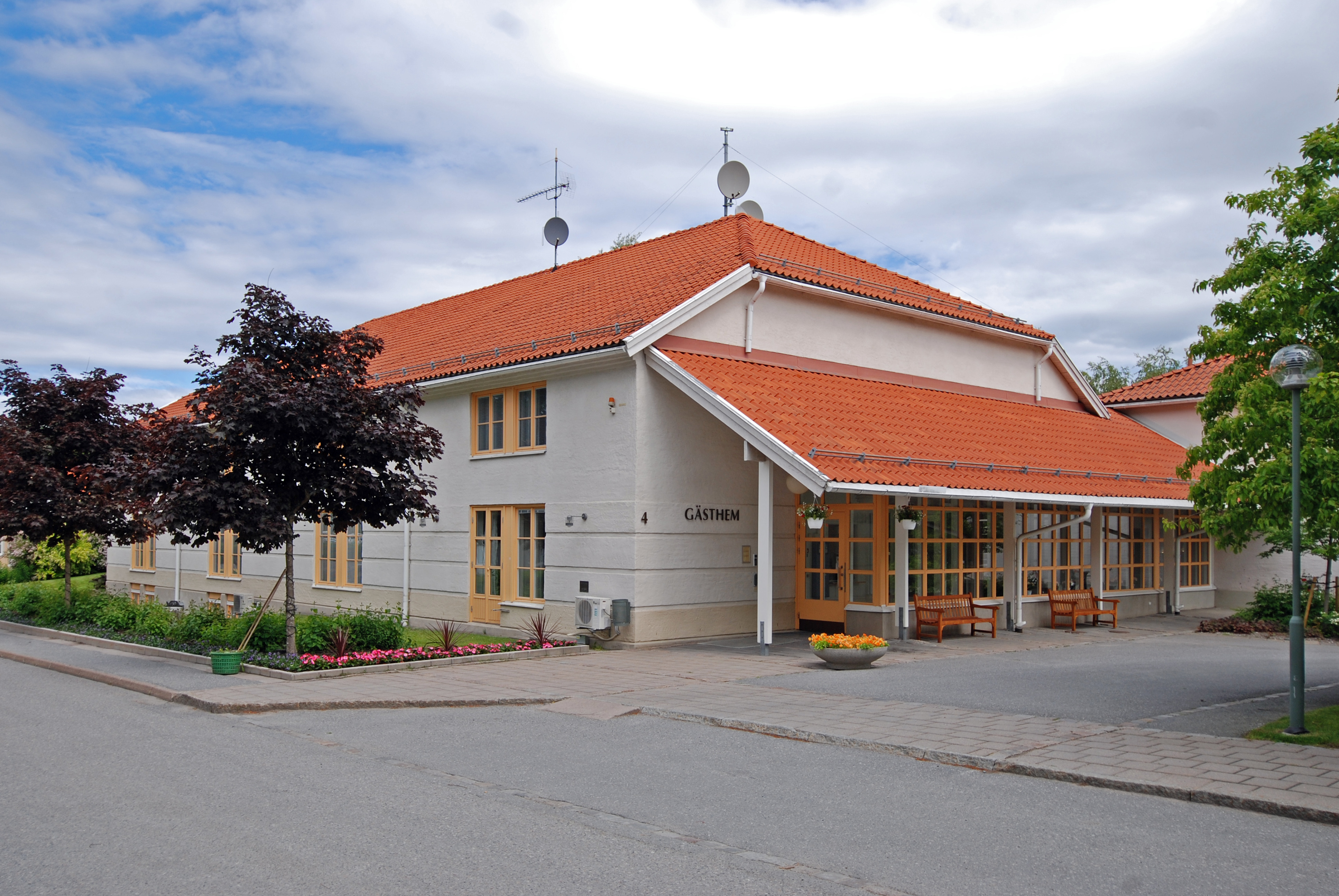
The temple's guesthouse

The temple grounds comprise a 4.47-acre (1.81 ha) wooded site in Västerhaninge, about 13 miles (21 km) southeast of central Stockholm. A guesthouse located on the grounds provides accommodations for up to 120 patrons.

== Temple presidents ==
The church's temples are directed by a temple president and matron, each typically serving for a term of three years. The president and matron supervise the ceremonies and ordinances that take place within the temple, along with overseeing the physical building. Serving from 1985 to 1988, John Langeland was the first president. As of 2021, Bo C. Bertilson is the president, with Nancy L. Bertilson serving as matron.

== Admittance ==
After the public open house was held, the temple was dedicated by Gordon B. Hinckley in July 1985. As temples are revered as sacred space, participation in the dedication and entrance into the temple afterwards is limited to church members with a current temple recommend. At its closure in 2023, the temple was serving members in Sweden, Norway, and Latvia.

== Site archaeology ==
The temple was built on a part of the ancient Åby Grave Field (Swedish: Åbygravfältet). During 1982–1983, an archaeological excavation of the future temple grounds was carried out. Hundreds of gravesites, most of which contained cremations and were marked by stones laid out in intricate patterns, were discovered. The graves dated primarily from the Pre-Roman and Roman Iron Ages, with the latest dated circa 100–200 CE. In 2000, directly across Tempelvägen from the temple grounds, the remains of a pentagon-shaped structure were excavated. These remains were described in the media as an ancient Norse temple. The sites of the ancient and modern temples are only 165 feet (50 m) apart.

== See also ==
- Comparison of temples of the Church of Jesus Christ of Latter-day Saints
- List of temples of the Church of Jesus Christ of Latter-day Saints
- List of temples of the Church of Jesus Christ of Latter-day Saints by geographic region
- Temple architecture (Latter-day Saints)
- The Church of Jesus Christ of Latter-day Saints in Sweden
