= Second anointing =

Rare Latter-day Saint ordinance

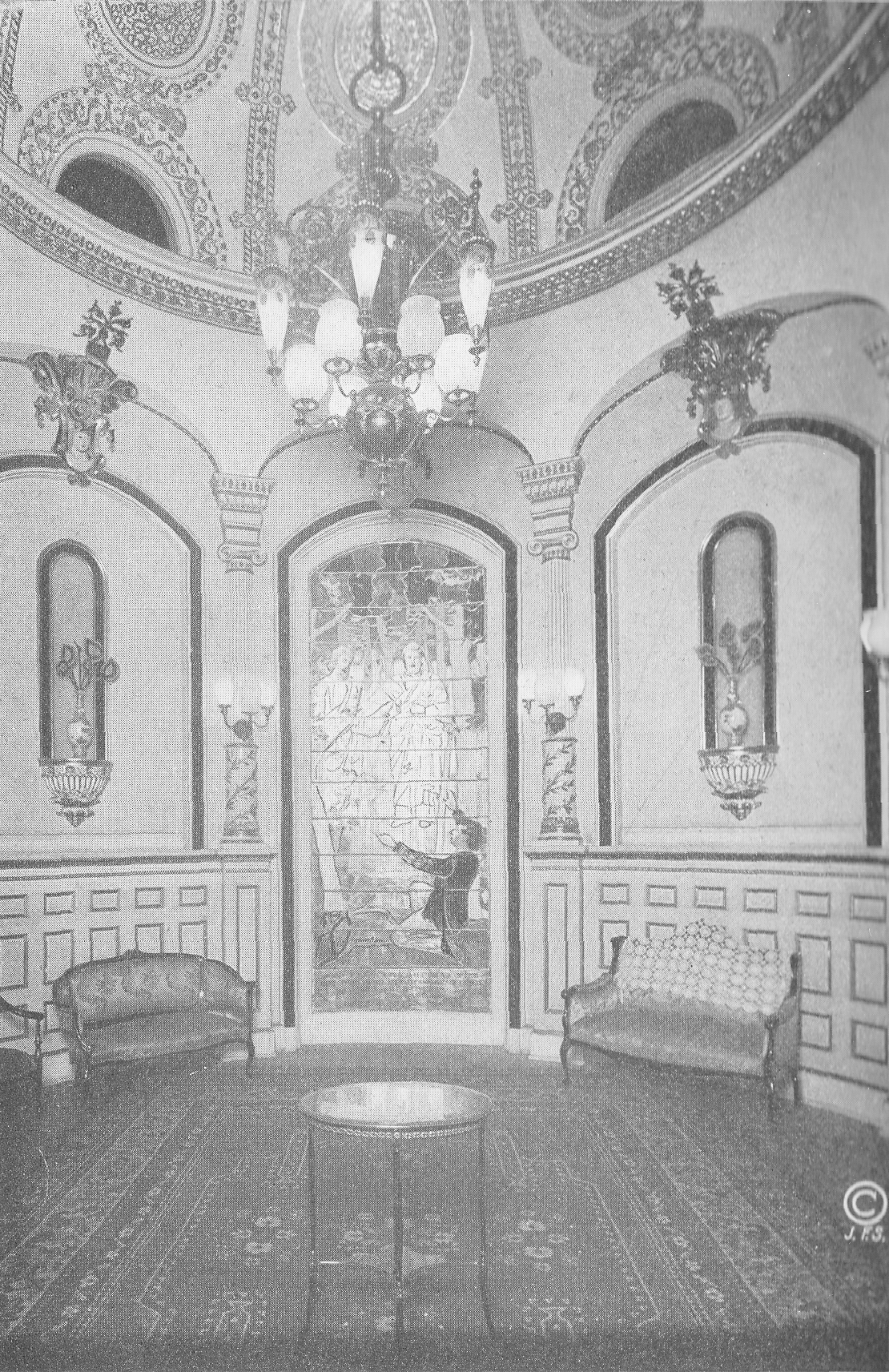
Holy of Holies in the Salt Lake Temple, a room where second anointings have taken place.

In the Latter Day Saint movement, the second anointing, or second endowment, is the pinnacle ordinance of the temple and an extension of the endowment ceremony. Joseph Smith taught that the function of the ordinance was to ensure salvation, guarantee exaltation, and confer godhood. In the ordinance, a participant is anointed as a "priest and king" or a "priestess and queen", and is sealed to the highest degree of salvation available in Mormon theology.

In the Church of Jesus Christ of Latter-day Saints (LDS Church), Mormonism's largest denomination, the ordinance is currently only given in secret to select couples whom top leaders say God has chosen. The LDS Church regularly performed the ceremony for nominated couples from the 1840s to the 1920s, and continued less regularly into the 1940s. By 1941, about 15,000 second anointings had been performed for the living, and over 6,000 for the dead. The practice became much less common thereafter, but has continued into modern times. Most modern LDS adherents are unaware of the ritual's existence. Instructors in the church's institutes of religion are told, "Do not attempt in any way to discuss or answer questions about the second anointing" [emphasis in the original]. The ordinance is also performed by many Mormon fundamentalist groups. However, it is not performed by denominations such as the Community of Christ, who historically did not practice the Nauvoo endowment ceremony.

== History ==
=== Under Smith (1842–1844) ===
==== First performance of the ritual ====
Joseph Smith introduced the Nauvoo endowment in 1842, but stated that his work in establishing the "fullness of the priesthood" was not yet complete. In August 1843, church apostle Brigham Young stated that "[i]f any in the Church had the fullness of the priesthood, he did not know it". Young understood that the "fullness of the priesthood" involved an anointing as "king and priest", with the actual kingdom to be given after resurrection. The first time a Second Anointing was performed was on September 28, 1843, when Smith and one of his wives, Emma, received it. During Smith's lifetime, the second anointing was performed on at least 20 men and 17 women. Historian Gary James Bergera stated that the ordinance functioned as a de facto marriage sealing, though recipient Alpheus Cutler (founder of the Cutlerite branch of Mormonism) and two of his five wives (Abigail Andrews and Sally Cox) who also received the ordinance were not sealed at the time. Additionally, Orson Pratt and Parley P. Pratt received the ordinance without their wives. Many of the Anointed Quorum and Council of Fifty received their second anointing under Smith. About 40% of all male recipients of the ordinance in Smith's lifetime were in polygamous marriages.

=== LDS practice under Young (1842–1877) ===
After Smith's death, and the subsequent succession crisis, Young became leader for the majority of Smith's adherents. In January 1846, he began administering the second anointing in the nearly completed Nauvoo Temple. Young re-administered the ordinance to many of those who had received it under Smith, and he delegated his authority to others, who performed nearly 600 second anointings (some to polygamous unions) before the temple was closed on February 7, 1846. After migration to the Salt Lake Valley, records do not show the administration of further LDS second anointings for two decades (until 1866). Beginning in the 1870s, second anointings began to be performed vicariously for dead members of the church.

=== LDS practice under Taylor and after (1877–1950) ===
In the 1880s, church president John Taylor was concerned that too many second anointings were being performed, and he instituted a series of procedural safeguards, requiring recommendation by a stake president, and a guideline that the ordinance "belonged particularly to old men". In 1901, church president Lorenzo Snow further limited accessibility to the ordinance by outlining stringent criteria for worthiness.

By 1918, over 14,000 second anointings had been performed for the living and the dead. During the administration of church president Heber J. Grant in the 1920s, the frequency of second anointings was dramatically reduced. Stake presidents at the local congregation level were no longer permitted to recommend candidates for the ordinance; rather, recommendations could only be made by higher-ranking leaders in the Quorum of Twelve Apostles. By 1941, just under 15,000 second anointings had been performed for the living, and just over 6,000 for the dead. The church has not allowed historians to have access to second anointing records subsequent to 1941; therefore, the current frequency of second anointings is unknown. It is known that in 1942, 13 of the church's 32 general authorities had not received the second anointing. In 1949, one apostle wrote the rite had been "practically discontinued".

=== Modern LDS practice ===
Second anointings continue to be practiced in the modern-day church. The modern Latter-Day Saint practice is kept absolutely secret and is only given to a very small number of adherents, usually after a lifetime of loyal service to the church. One British former stake president and former area executive secretary, Tom Phillips, said his spouse and he had received the ordinance before his public disaffiliation. According to historian D. Michael Quinn, both of the late church presidents Spencer W. Kimball (president from 1973–1985) and Russell M. Nelson (president from 2018–2025) received their second anointing in 1974; Nelson alluded to this experience in his 1979 autobiography.

=== Eligibility ===
Some members of the church were historically or are currently ineligible for the second anointing ordinance. All candidates for the rite cannot be single and must be temple married before receiving it, and between 1847 and 1978 all LDS endowment-related temple ordinances including the second anointing were denied to all members with Black ancestry. All temple ordinances continue to be denied for non-heterosexual couples and transgender couples as of 2025.

=== Confidentiality ===
The ordinance is currently only given confidentially to select couples, and most current LDS adherents are unaware of the ritual's existence. Additionally, church class instructors are emphatically told not to discuss the ceremony at all. Historically, the church's newspaper openly discussed the rite's occurrence in print, and at least one obituary from a largely LDS Utah city mentioned the ordinance in 1909. In response to a researcher publishing an academic article on the topic in the 1980s the church banned him from future access to its historical archives and increased restrictions on public access. In 1978 Mark Hofmann forged a handwritten document purporting to be a historical description of the secret ordinance and sold it to Utah State University.

== Ceremony ==
Part of the ceremony consists of a feet washing similar to a Bickertonite Latter Day Saint feet washing shown here.

According to 19th-century journal entries and contemporary sources, the LDS second anointing ceremony consists of three parts:

1. Prayer and Washing – First the couple and an officiator or two participate in a prayer circle (conducted by the husband) in a dedicated temple room, and then a male officiator washes only the husband's feet.
2. Anointing – Next the officiator anoints the husband as a king and priest to God, and then anoints the wife as a queen and priestess to her husband. For example, the following words were used by Heber C. Kimball during the second anointing of Brigham Young in the Nauvoo temple in 1846: "Brother Brigham Young, I pour this holy consecrated oil upon your head and anoint thee a king and a priest of the most high God, over the Church of Jesus Christ of Latter-day Saints and unto all Israel. ... And I seal thee up unto eternal life, that thou shalt come forth in the morn of the first resurrection ... and thou shalt attain unto the eternal Godhead and receive a fulness of joy, and glory, and power; and that thou mayest do all things whatsoever is wisdom that thou shouldst do, even if it be to create worlds and redeem them."
3. Washing of the Husband – Later, the wife symbolically prepares her husband for his death and resurrection as his priestess by washing and anointing the husband's feet and then laying her hands on his head to give a blessing. This portion of the ceremony was historically done at home, in a room dedicated by the husband. Elder Hans Mattsson and his wife Birgitta described that they were led into a private room that would normally be used for the Temple endowment, where a bowl of water and towel were prepared for Birgitta to wash Hans' feet and give him a Priesthood blessing.

Before 1846 the woman was also anointed as a "priestess unto God," but Brigham Young changed the ceremony and readministered the rite such that the wife would now be a "queen and priestess unto thine husband." The woman would also be exalted through her husband instead of through God, but only if she "do[th] obey [her husband’s] counsel."

== Meaning and symbolism ==
=== First anointing meanings ===
The "first anointing" refers to the washing and anointing part of the endowment ceremony, in which a person is anointed to become a king and priest or a queen and priestess unto God. In the second anointing, on the other hand, participants are anointed as a king and priest, or queen and priestess. When the anointing is given, according to Brigham Young, the participant "will then have received the fulness of the Priesthood, all that can be given on earth." The "first anointing" promises blessings in the afterlife contingent on the patron's faithfulness, while the second anointing actually bestows those blessings.

=== Second anointing meanings ===
Church leaders have stated that those who participate in the second anointing ordinance have received the "fullness of the priesthood", their "calling and election made sure", their eternal temple marriage "sealed by the holy spirit of promise", and received the "more sure word of prophecy", "higher blessing," or "second endowment". According to prominent 20th-century LDS Church apostle Bruce R. McConkie, those who have their calling and election made sure "receive the more sure word of prophecy, which means that the Lord seals their exaltation upon them while they are yet in this life. ... [T]heir exaltation is assured."

The second anointing may have been intended to fulfill scriptural references to the "fulness of the priesthood", such as that in Doctrine and Covenants 124:28, a revelation by Joseph Smith commanding the building of a temple in Nauvoo, Illinois, in part, because "there is not a place found on earth that he may come to and restore again that which was lost unto you, or which he hath taken away, even the fulness of the priesthood" (emphasis added). LDS Church leaders have connected this ordinance with a statement by Peter in his second Epistle. In 2 Peter 1:10, he talks about making one's "calling and election sure," and further remarks, "We have also a more sure word of prophecy" (2 Peter 1:19). Smith referenced this process in saying, "When the Lord has thoroughly proved [a person], and finds that the [person] is determined to serve Him at all hazards, then the [person] will find his calling and election made sure".

Buerger notes that early interpretation of the second anointing seems very close to the Calvinist doctrine of predestination, with the belief that the rite's guarantees were "unconditional".

=== Feminine priestesshood ===
The second anointing is performed only on married, heterosexual couples. Some writers have argued that because of this, women who receive the second anointing (in which they are anointed as "priestesses") are ordained to the "fulness of the priesthood" in the same manner as their husbands. These scholars suggest that Smith may have considered these women to have, in fact, received the power of the priesthood, though not necessarily a specific priesthood office.

== Controversy and criticism ==
The ceremony has been criticized and viewed as controversial. One former member stated that learning of the elitism and secrecy around the second anointing started him questioning LDS church authority. A 1910 Salt Lake Tribune editor's criticism of LDS temple practices stated in a negative tone that one LDS leader who had received his "second anointings" prayed in 1867 for the damnation of all Americans.

Hans Mattsson, a former member of the area authority seventy, spoke publicly about his experience receiving the second anointing in the Frankfurt Temple.

== See also ==
- Anointed Quorum
- Sealing power
- Washing and anointing
