= Chicago Illinois Temple =

Temple of the LDS church

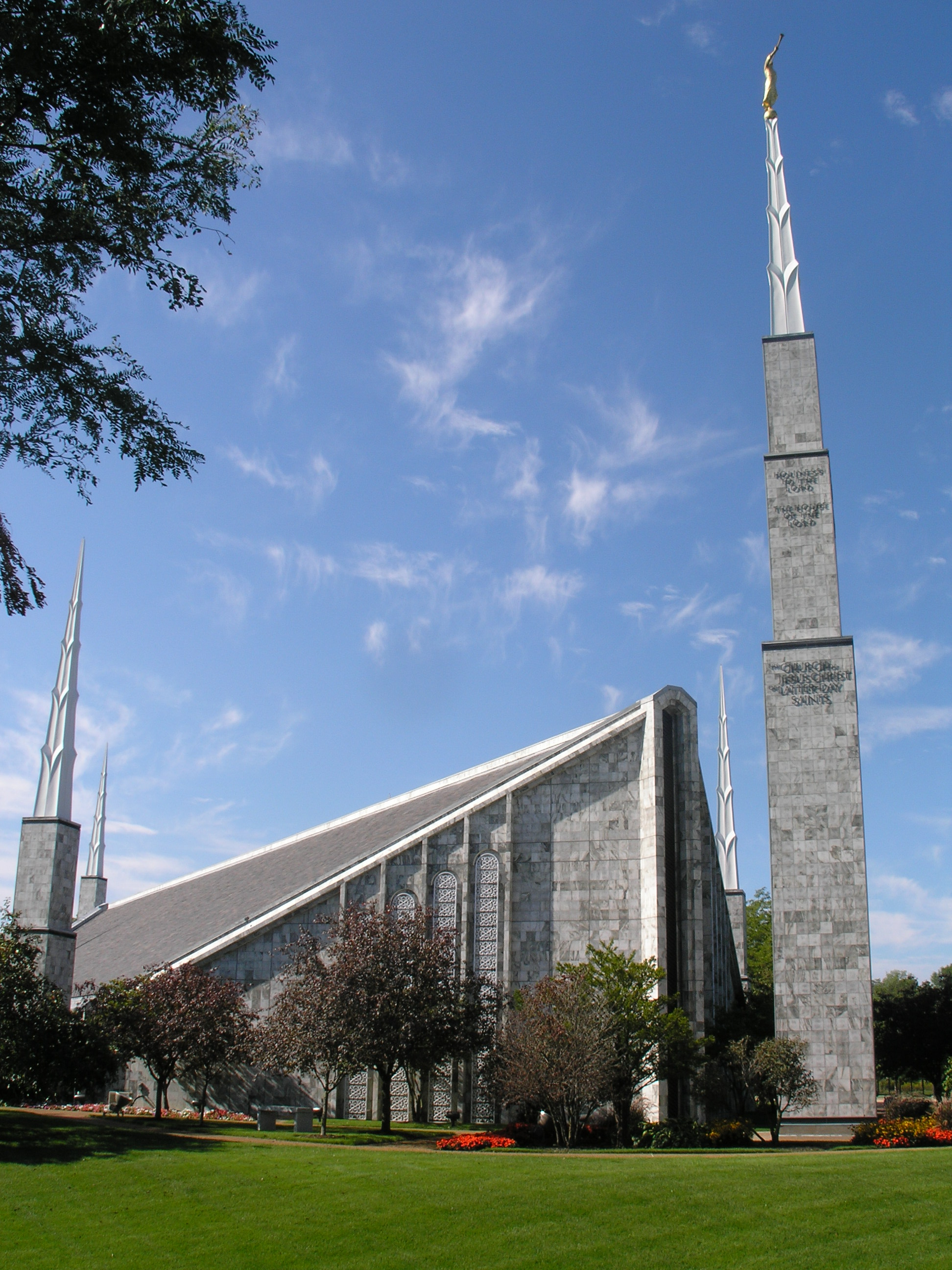
- Interactive map of Chicago Illinois Temple
- Number: 35
- Dedication: August 9, 1985, by Gordon B. Hinckley
- Site: 13 acres (5.3 ha)
- Floor area: 37,062 ft^{2} (3,443.2 m^{2})
- Height: 112 ft (34 m)
- Official website • News & images

Church chronology
← Stockholm Sweden Temple	Chicago Illinois Temple	→ Johannesburg South Africa Temple

Additional information
- Announced: April 1, 1981, by Spencer W. Kimball
- Groundbreaking: August 13, 1983, by Gordon B. Hinckley
- Open house: July 15 – August 3, 1985
- Rededicated: October 8, 1989, by Gordon B. Hinckley
- Current president: Richard DeVries
- Designed by: Wight & Co and Church A&E Services
- Location: Glenview, Illinois, United States
- Coordinates: 42°5′12.6″N 87°51′34.2″W
- Exterior finish: Temple granite
- Design: Modern adaptation of six-spire design
- Baptistries: 1
- Ordinance rooms: 5 (stationary)
- Sealing rooms: 3
- Notes: Rededication in 1989 was for the addition only

The Chicago Illinois Temple is the thirty-fifth temple of the Church of Jesus Christ of Latter-day Saints. It is the second of three church temples that have been built in Illinois (The first and the third being the original and rebuilt temples in Nauvoo). The intent to build the temple was announced during a press conference on April 1, 1981, by church president Spencer W. Kimball.

The temple has six detached spires and a statue of the angel Moroni. Designed by church architectural staff and local architecture firm Wight & Co, the structure is a sister temple to those in Boise, Idaho and Dallas, Texas. A groundbreaking ceremony, to signify beginning of construction, was held on August 13, 1983, conducted by Gordon B. Hinckley.

== History ==
The intent to construct the temple was announced by Spencer W. Kimball on April 1, 1981. Located in the Chicago suburb of Glenview, ground was broken on the site on August 13, 1983 by Gordon B. Hinckley, a member of the church's First Presidency. The structure itself was constructed in gray buff marble and its roof features gray slate. Architects used a new design, adapting the traditional six-spire design and adding modern motifs.

The construction of the temple faced some pushback from the community due to environmental concerns. Construction was eventually able to proceed. Construction of the temple also allowed local Latter-day Saints to contribute their means, talents, and time. This included children donating pennies, young women making dolls for the temple nursery, and women crocheting and tatting altar cloths. Many hours were donated in helping with the public open house, held July 15 – August 3, 1985, during which over one hundred thousand people toured the temple. Hinckley dedicated the temple on August 9, 1985.

Four years after the dedication, the temple was closed and expanded, which more than doubled its size. The temple now has a total of 37,062 square feet (3,443.2 m^{2}), five ordinance rooms, and three sealing rooms.

On December 24, 2008, a frozen sprinkler pipe burst in the ceiling, with water-damaged furniture, carpet and wood trim that all had to be replaced.

In 2020, like all the church's other temples, the Chicago Illinois Temple was closed in response to the COVID-19 pandemic.

== Design and architecture ==
The building has a modern architectural style, coupled with a traditional Latter-day Saint temple design. The temple's architecture reflects both the cultural heritage of the Chicago region and its spiritual significance to the church.

=== Site ===
The temple sits on a 13-acre plot, and the landscaping around the temple includes two water features. These elements are designed to provide a tranquil setting that enhances the sacred atmosphere of the site.

=== Exterior ===
The structure stands 112 feet tall, constructed with gray buff marble with a gray slate roof. The exterior is characterized by six detached spires and an angel Moroni statue, elements which were each chosen for their symbolic significance and alignment with temple traditions. The design incorporates elements that are reflective of both the local culture and church symbolism.

=== Interior ===
The interior features glass-paneled ceilings, ornamental marble, and chandeliers, centered around the celestial room, which is designed to create a spiritually uplifting environment. The temple includes five instruction rooms, three sealing rooms, a baptistry, and a celestial room, each designed for ceremonial use.

=== Symbols ===
The design uses elements representing Latter-day Saint symbolism, which provide deeper spiritual meaning to the temple's appearance and function. Symbolism is important to church members. One of the most visible symbolic elements of the temple is its six spires, used in the 1960s and 1980s to emulate the Salt Lake Temple, and the spires also symbolize the Aaronic and Melchizedek priesthoods.

== Renovations ==
The temple has undergone several renovations to preserve its structural integrity, update facilities, and enhance its spiritual and aesthetic appeal. The most significant renovation project commenced in 1988.

The renovations of the temple focused on several key areas, including expanding its interior. These changes were made to ensure the temple's compliance with contemporary building standards and to accommodate the evolving needs of church members. The renovations included the relocation of a central tower from the rear exterior to a foyer near the chapel.

The renovated temple was rededicated on October 8, 1989, by Gordon B. Hinckley.

== Temple presidents ==
The church's temples are directed by a temple president and matron, each serving for a term of three years. The president and matron oversee the administration of temple operations and provide guidance and training for both temple patrons and staff.

The first president of the Chicago Illinois Temple was Lysle R. Cahoon, with the matron being Betty Jane P. Cahoon. They served from 1985 to 1988. As of 2024, Jack D. Ward is the president, with Sharmon O. Ward serving as matron.

== Admittance ==
When construction was completed, the church held a public open house from July 15-August 3, 1985. The temple was then dedicated by Gordon B. Hinckley in 19 dedicatory sessions from August 9-13, 1985. Following the temple’s renovation period, it was rededicated by Gordon B. Hinckley on October 8, 1989. Like all the church's temples, it is not used for Sunday worship services. To members of the church, temples are regarded as sacred houses of the Lord. Once dedicated, only church members with a current temple recommend can enter for worship.

== See also ==
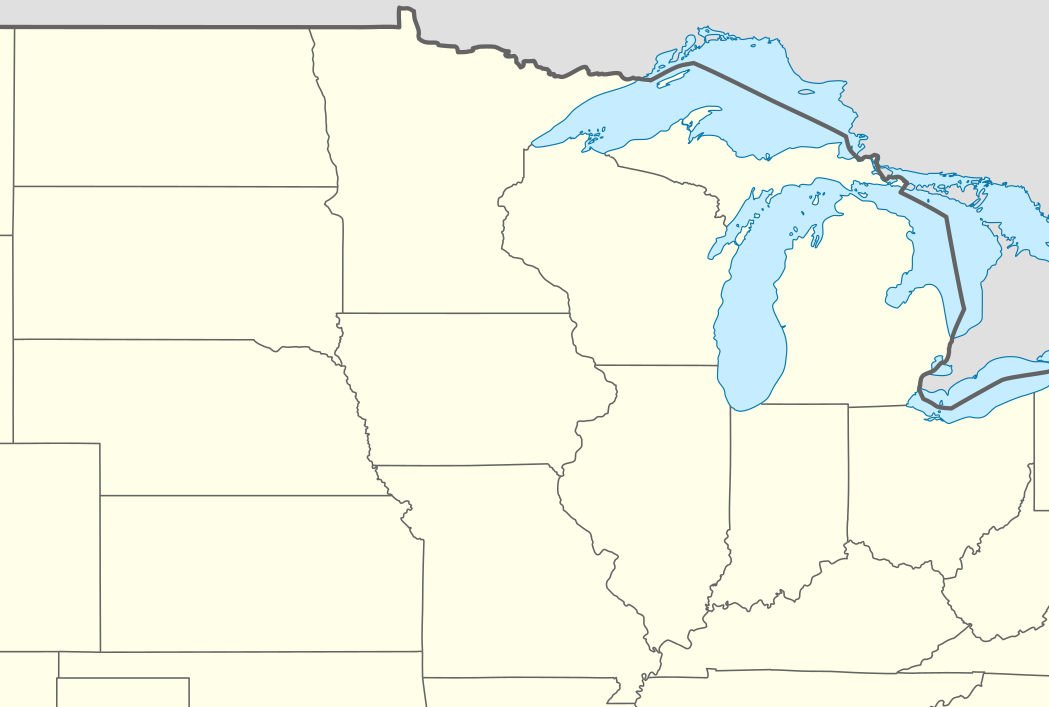
Temples in the United States Midwest
- = Operating
- = Under construction
- = Announced
- = Closed for renovation
- Comparison of temples of The Church of Jesus Christ of Latter-day Saints
- List of temples of The Church of Jesus Christ of Latter-day Saints
- List of temples of The Church of Jesus Christ of Latter-day Saints by geographic region
- Temple architecture (Latter-day Saints)
- The Church of Jesus Christ of Latter-day Saints in Illinois
