= Hans Mattsson =

Swedish Mormon leader

3rd Quorum of the Seventy of the Church of Jesus Christ of Latter-day Saints
- April 15, 2000 – May 1, 2005

Hans H. Mattsson is a former member of the Seventy in the Church of Jesus Christ of Latter-day Saints (LDS Church) in Europe.

Mattsson is one of the few members of the LDS Church to publicly discuss his experience receiving the Second Anointing ritual.

LDS historian Greg Prince described Mattsson as "the highest-ranking church official who has gone public with deep concerns" about the LDS Church.

== Biography ==
Mattsson was raised in the LDS Church. As a young man he served as a missionary, as is common in the LDS Church, and was assigned to the Central British Mission headquartered in Birmingham, England. There he learned English, despite some difficulty, and felt his religious convictions grow. After returning to Sweden he married Birgitta, a convert to the church, and they have five children.

Mattsson and his twin brother Leif were both called in senior positions as leaders in the LDS Church. First Hans, then Leif, served as stake presidents in Gothenburg, Sweden. In April 2000, Hans became the first Swede to serve as an area seventy. He held a secular job in technology marketing, but traveled widely in Europe at weekends, overseeing the church. He was released from the position of area seventy in April 2005 when he had heart surgery.

Members began asking Mattsson about criticisms that they had read on the Internet, including the many wives of church founder Joseph Smith, the authenticity of the Book of Abraham, and the exclusion of black people from the priesthood until 1978. Mattsson was dissatisfied with the answers that he in turn received from the church's highest authorities in 2010, and in 2013 he publicized his own doubts on John Dehlin's Mormon Stories Podcast and in the New York Times, stating that "I don’t want to hurt the church … I just want the truth."

In 2013, Mattsson and his wife moved to Spain for health reasons.

Mattsson again appeared on the Mormon Stories Podcast in 2018, where he and is wife Brigitta discussed their experience receiving the Second Anointing ritual.

== Public Discussion of the Second Anointing ==
Mattsson is one of the few Latter-day Saints to publicly discuss the Second Anointing ritual, the highest ordinance practiced in the Church.

Mattsson and his wife Birgitta appeared on the Mormon Stories Podcast in 2018 where they divulged details of this highly secretive ritual. During the ritual, which took place in the Frankfurt Temple, Mattsson had his feet washed by Elder M. Russell Ballard, before being anointed as a King and a Priest to the Most High God, and guaranteed salvation and godhood in the Celestial Kingdom. Then Elder Ballard anointed Mattsson's wife, Birgitta, to be a Queen and Priest, guaranteed the same salvation as her husband.

Then Mattsson and his wife went into a private room where his wife washed his feet again, and placed her hands on his head to give him a Priesthood blessing.

== Bibliography ==
- Mattsson, Hans; Hanke, Christina (2018). Sökte sanning, fann tvivel (in Swedish). CreateSpace Independent Publishing Platform. ISBN 9781722885755.
- Mattsson, Hans; Hanke, Christina (2018). Truth Seeking. Andersson & Isacson AB. ISBN 9789198412574. English edition of Sökte sanning, fann tvivel.
- "Truth Seeking with Hans and Birgitta Mattsson Pt. 2 - Mormon Stories #985". YouTube. 27 September 2018.
- "984-985: TRUTH SEEKING WITH HANS AND BIRGITTA MATTSSON". Mormon Stories. 27 September 2018.

== See also ==
- The Church of Jesus Christ of Latter-day Saints in Sweden
- Criticism of the Church of Jesus Christ of Latter-day Saints
- Second Anointing
