= Temple (LDS Church) =

Latter Day Saint movement place of worship

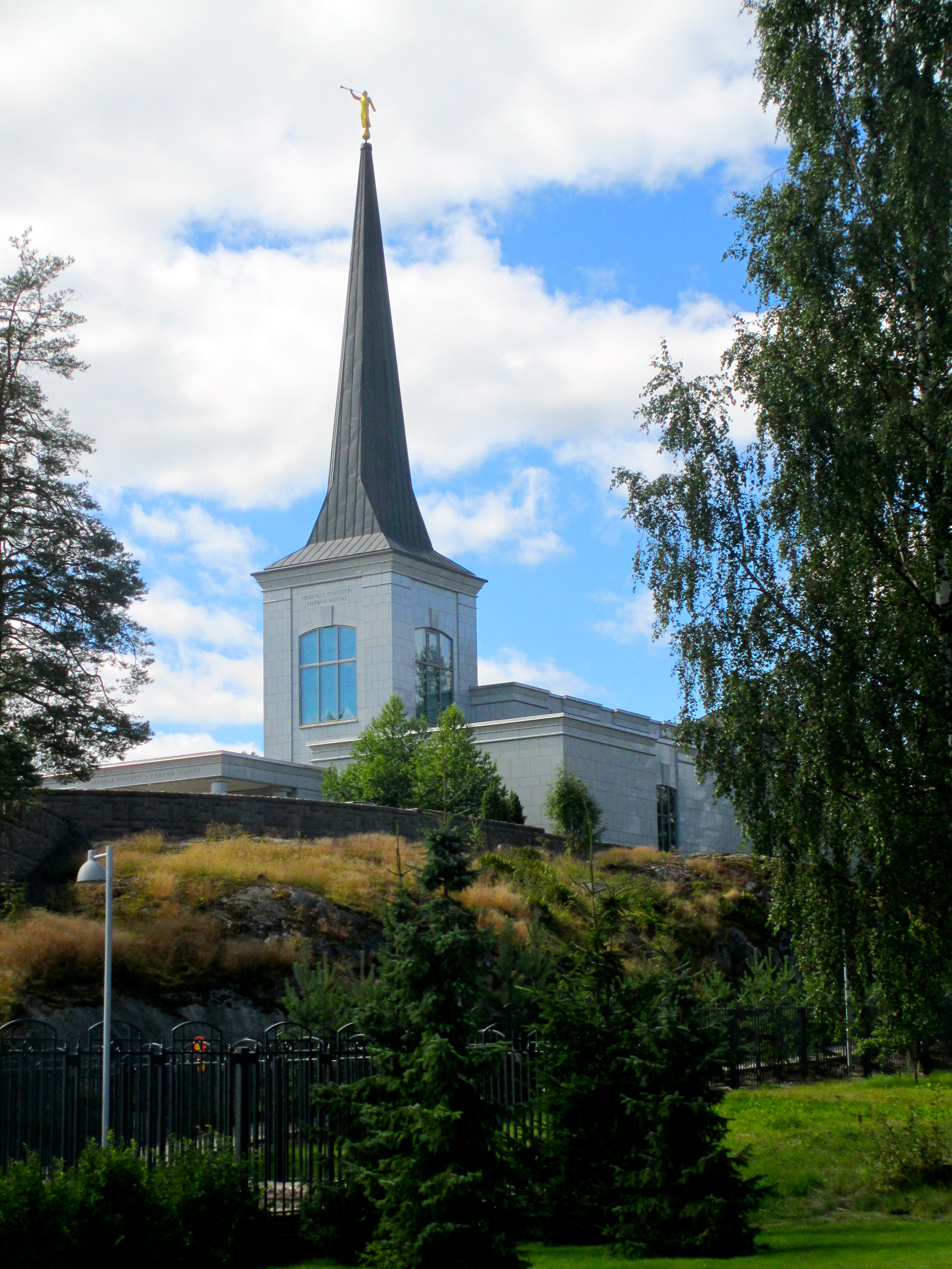
The Helsinki Finland Temple in the Karakallio district in Espoo, Finland

In the Church of Jesus Christ of Latter-day Saints (LDS Church), a temple is a building dedicated to be a House of the Lord. Temples are considered by church members to be the most sacred structures on earth.

Upon completion, temples are usually open to the public for a short period of time (an "open house"). During the open house, the church conducts tours of the temple with missionaries and members from the local area serving as tour guides, and all rooms of the temple are open to the public. The temple is then dedicated as a "House of the Lord", after which only members who are deemed "temple-worthy" by their congregational leaders are permitted entrance.

Temples are not churches or meetinghouses designated for public weekly worship services, but rather are places of worship open only to the faithful where certain rites of the church must be performed.

The LDS Church has 385 temples in various phases, which includes 224 dedicated temples (218 operating, 6 undergoing renovations), 11 with dedications scheduled, 55 under construction, 8 with groundbreaking ceremonies scheduled, and 87 others announced (not yet under construction). There are temples in many U.S. states, as well as in many countries across the world. Several temples are at historical sites of the LDS Church, such as Nauvoo, Illinois, Palmyra, New York, and Salt Lake City, Utah. The importance of temples is often emphasized in weekly meetings, and regular participation in "temple work" is strongly encouraged for all Latter-day Saints (LDS).

Within temples, members of the church make covenants, receive instructions, and perform sacred ceremonies and ordinances, such as baptism for the dead, washing and anointing (or "initiatory" ordinances), the endowment, and eternal marriage sealings. Ordinances are a vital part of the theology of the church, which teaches that they were practiced by the Lord's covenant people in all dispensations.

LDS temple construction reached an all-time high in 2000. As of March 2016, there are 150 operating temples.

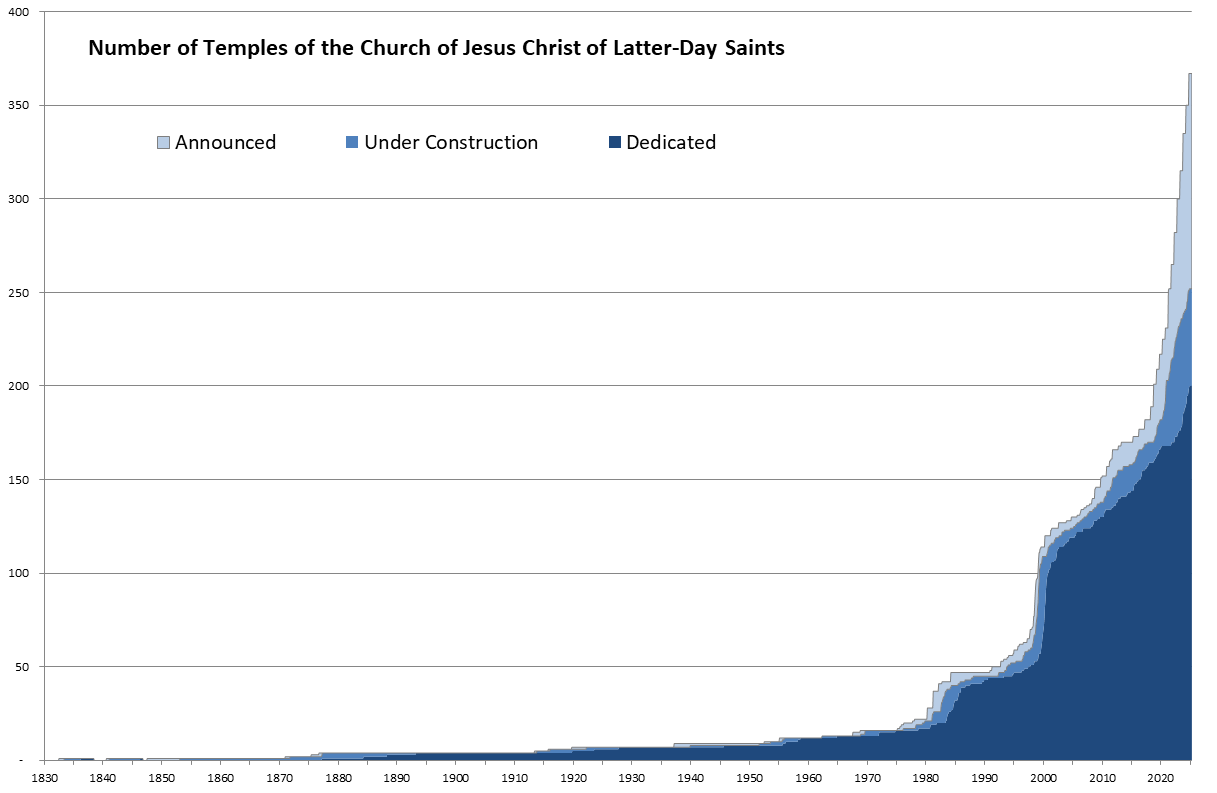
Chart of temple construction as of November 2024

== History ==
=== Biblical references ===
Latter-day Saints cite various Old Testament references to temple ordinances such as those found in Exodus 29:4–9, Exodus 28:2–43 and Leviticus 8:6–13. The words "HOLINESS TO THE LORD" can be found on LDS temples as referenced in Exodus 28:36.

Likewise the Tabernacle was considered a "portable temple" by the children of Israel in the Old Testament.

Worldwide Temples

=== Latter-day temples ===
The first Latter-day Saint temple ceremonies were performed in Kirtland, Ohio, but differed significantly from the endowment performed on the second floor of Joseph Smith's Red Brick Store in Nauvoo, Illinois, and the Nauvoo Temple. Kirtland ordinances included washings and anointings (differing in many ways from the modern portion) and the washing of the feet ordinance. For nearly four years, beginning in 1842, Smith's Red Brick Store functioned as a de facto temple—the site of the first washings, anointings, endowments, and sealings. In contrast, the grand edifice known as the Nauvoo Temple was in operation for only two months before the Latter Day Saints left Illinois for the West.

Preparations to initiate the first members of Smith's Quorum of the Anointed, or Holy Order, as it was also known, were made on May 3, 1842. The walls of the second level of the Red Brick Store were painted with garden-themed murals, the rooms fitted with carpets, potted plants, and a veil hung from the ceiling. All the while, the ground level continued to operate as Smith's general mercantile.

After the early events of the succession crisis, Brigham Young assumed control of the church's headquarters at Nauvoo, Illinois. While he and the rest of the Quorum of the Twelve made contingency plans for abandoning the city, he may have hoped that it would not prove necessary. For example, in early 1845, Young convened a conference at the Norwegian colony at Norway, Illinois, and announced a plan to build a Latter-day Saint town there with a temple for the use of the Norwegian Latter Day Saints.

Meanwhile, Young urged the Latter-day Saints in Nauvoo to redouble their efforts to finish the temple. By the end of 1845, the building was sufficiently finished to allow temple ordinances to be performed. Ordinances continued to be performed in early 1846 as the Mormons were forced to abandon the city. A small crew remained in the city and continued to work on the temple until April 30, 1846, when it was formally dedicated in a private ceremony by Joseph Young, the senior of the Seven Presidents of the Seventy. It was used for three months, then abandoned in late summer 1846. The completed temple was eventually destroyed by fire, and the remaining structure was later demolished by a whirlwind.

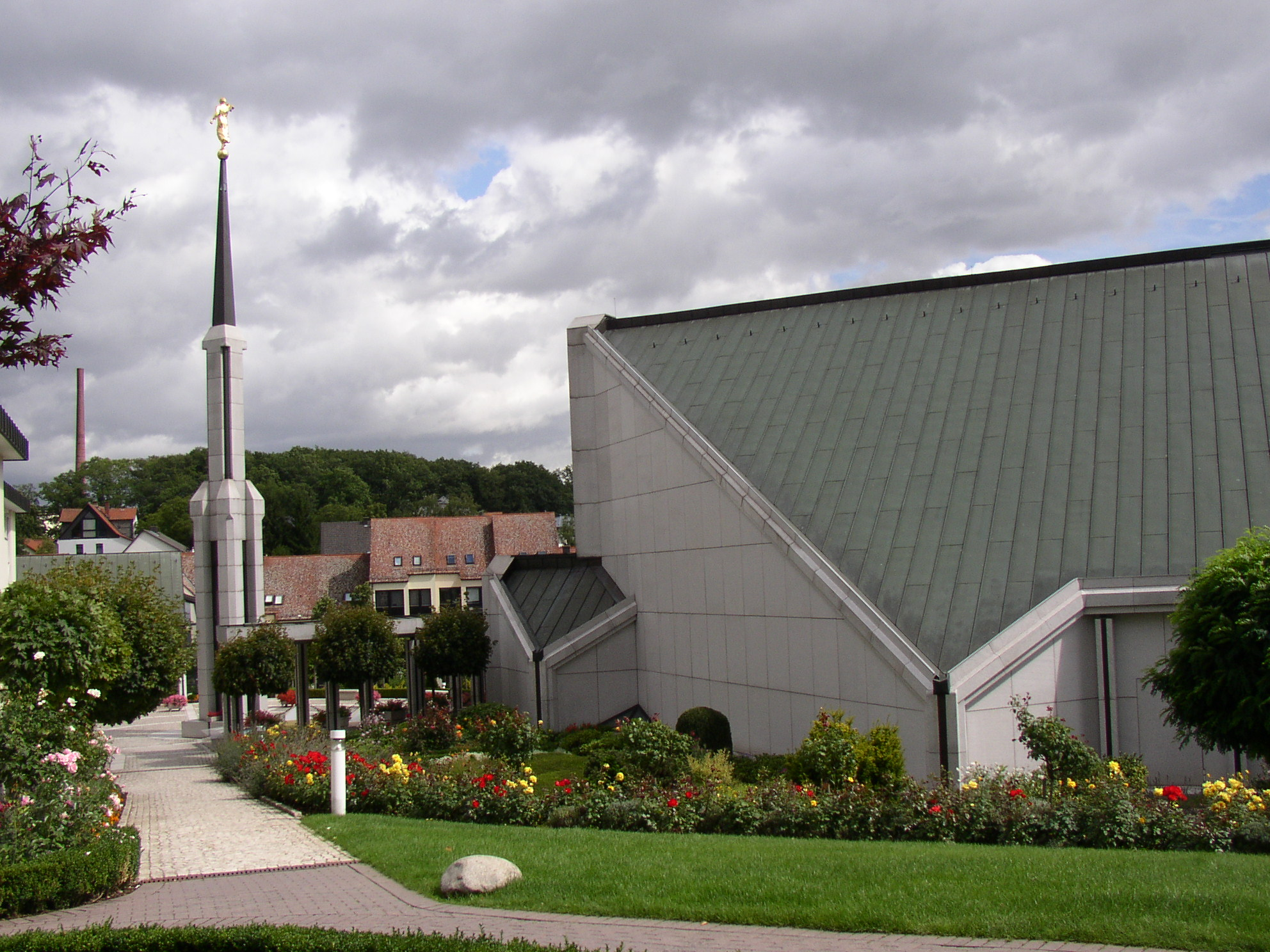
The Frankfurt Germany Temple

Upon reaching the Great Basin, Brigham Young began to build settlements based on the City of Zion plan and designated four of these to contain temples: Salt Lake City (1847), St. George (1871), Manti (1875), and Logan (1877). The St. George Temple was the first to be completed in 1877, followed by Logan (1884) and Manti (1888). The Salt Lake Temple took 40 years to complete because of various setbacks and delays. It was dedicated in 1893.

In the late 1880s and in 1890, a desire to continue the ordinance work in temples was a significant consideration preceding Wilford Woodruff's decision (announced in his Manifesto of September 1890) that the church would discontinue its practice of polygamy. In 1887 the US Congress passed the Edmunds–Tucker Act, which disincorporated the church and directed federal officials to begin seizing its assets, potentially including its temples. After a conversation with Woodruff, Marriner W. Merrill, at the time president of the Logan Temple, stated that the contemplated public announcement prohibiting additional polygamist unions was "the only way to retain the possession of our temples and continue the ordinance work for the living and dead which was considered of more importance than continuing the practice of plural marriage for the present."

Latter-day Saint temple building halted until the presidency of Joseph F. Smith, who announced two additional temples: Cardston, Alberta (1913), and Lāʻie, Hawaiʻi (1915). Cardston became the first Latter-day Saint temple dedicated outside of the United States. Smith broke with the previous tradition (established since Kirtland) of building temples with upper and lower courts. Temples previously had been ever larger, but the Laie Hawaii Temple was smaller than the Nauvoo Temple had been.

Both Cardston and Laie were dedicated under church president Heber J. Grant, as was a temple in Mesa, Arizona. George Albert Smith dedicated the next temple in Idaho Falls, Idaho. David O. McKay dedicated five additional temples including one in Bern, Switzerland—which was the first temple dedicated in Europe and the first temple to use film recording of the endowment rather than live actors. Joseph Fielding Smith dedicated a temple in Ogden, Utah, and Harold B. Lee dedicated its twin in Provo, Utah.

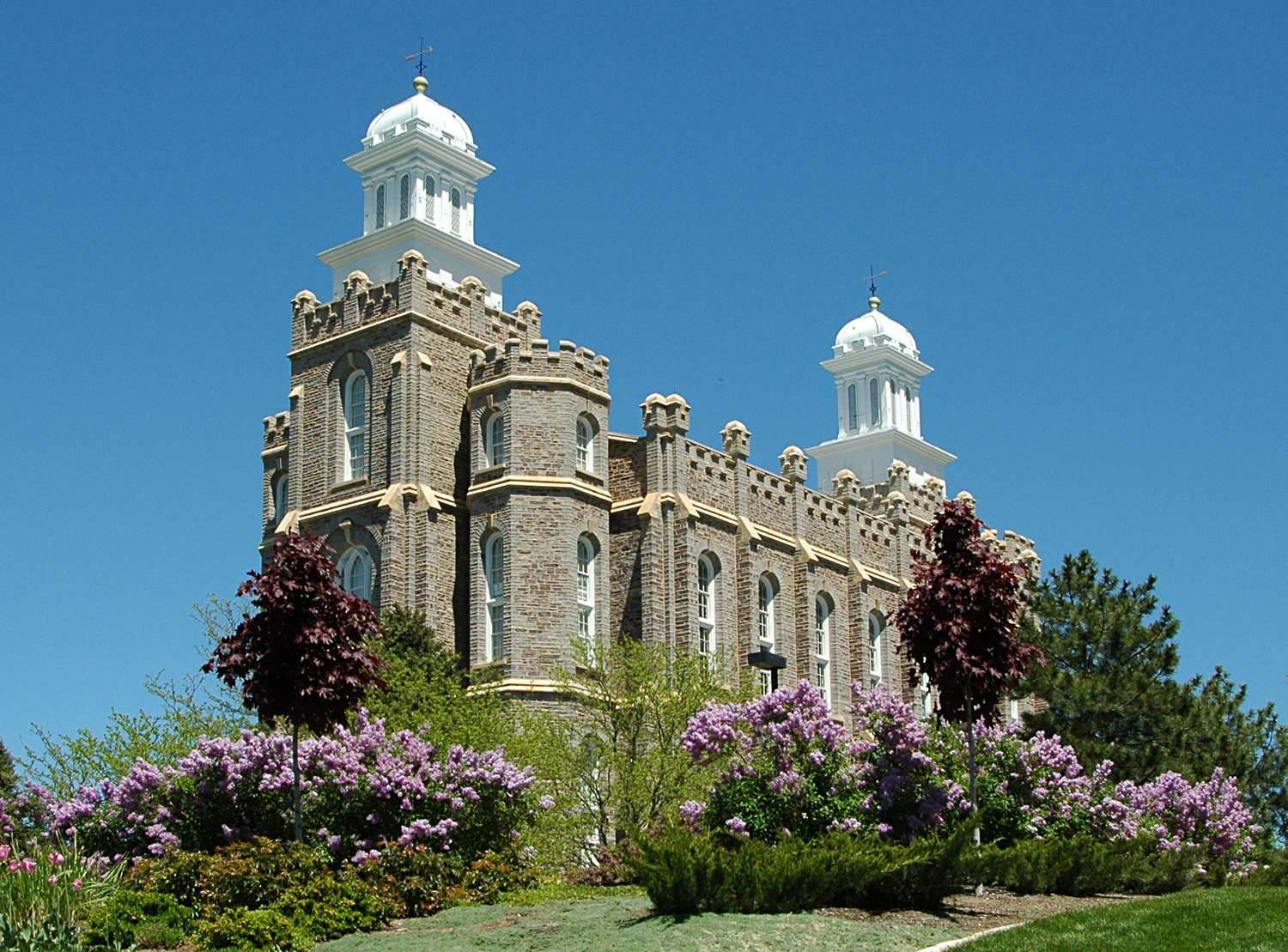
The Logan Utah Temple

Spencer W. Kimball began a plan to build many more smaller temples according to standardized plans. Twenty-one temples were dedicated during his presidency, including the tiny Papeete Tahiti Temple—which has a floorspace of less than 10,000 square feet (900 m^{2}). This trend has continued. Nine additional temples were dedicated in the presidency of Ezra Taft Benson and two in the brief presidency of Howard W. Hunter.

Under church president Gordon B. Hinckley, the church dedicated 77 temples. In 1997, Hinckley introduced a standardized, smaller temple plan designed to bring temple services to smaller or remote congregations at a reduced cost. The first of this new generation of temples was completed in 1998 with the Monticello Utah Temple. The original plan called for 6,800 square feet (630 m^{2}), later increased to 10,700 square feet (990 m^{2}). Subsequent revisions to the standard design further increased the size and complexity of the temples. The majority of the temples dedicated under Hinckley's tenure were of the smaller design. During Hinckley's administration, the temple in Nauvoo, Illinois was rebuilt, and is known as the Nauvoo Illinois Temple.

Hinckely's successor, Thomas S. Monson, dedicated 26 temples during his time as church president. His counselors in the First Presidency also dedicated a number of temples during Monson's administration.

As of October 2018, Monson's successor, Russell M. Nelson, has dedicated the Concepción Chile Temple. The LDS Church has 385 temples in various phases, which includes 224 dedicated temples (218 operating, 6 undergoing renovations), 11 with dedications scheduled, 55 under construction, 8 with groundbreaking ceremonies scheduled, and 87 others announced (not yet under construction). It has been suggested that recent temple construction represents an attempt by church leadership to “re-energize” congregations in the face of flat numerical growth.

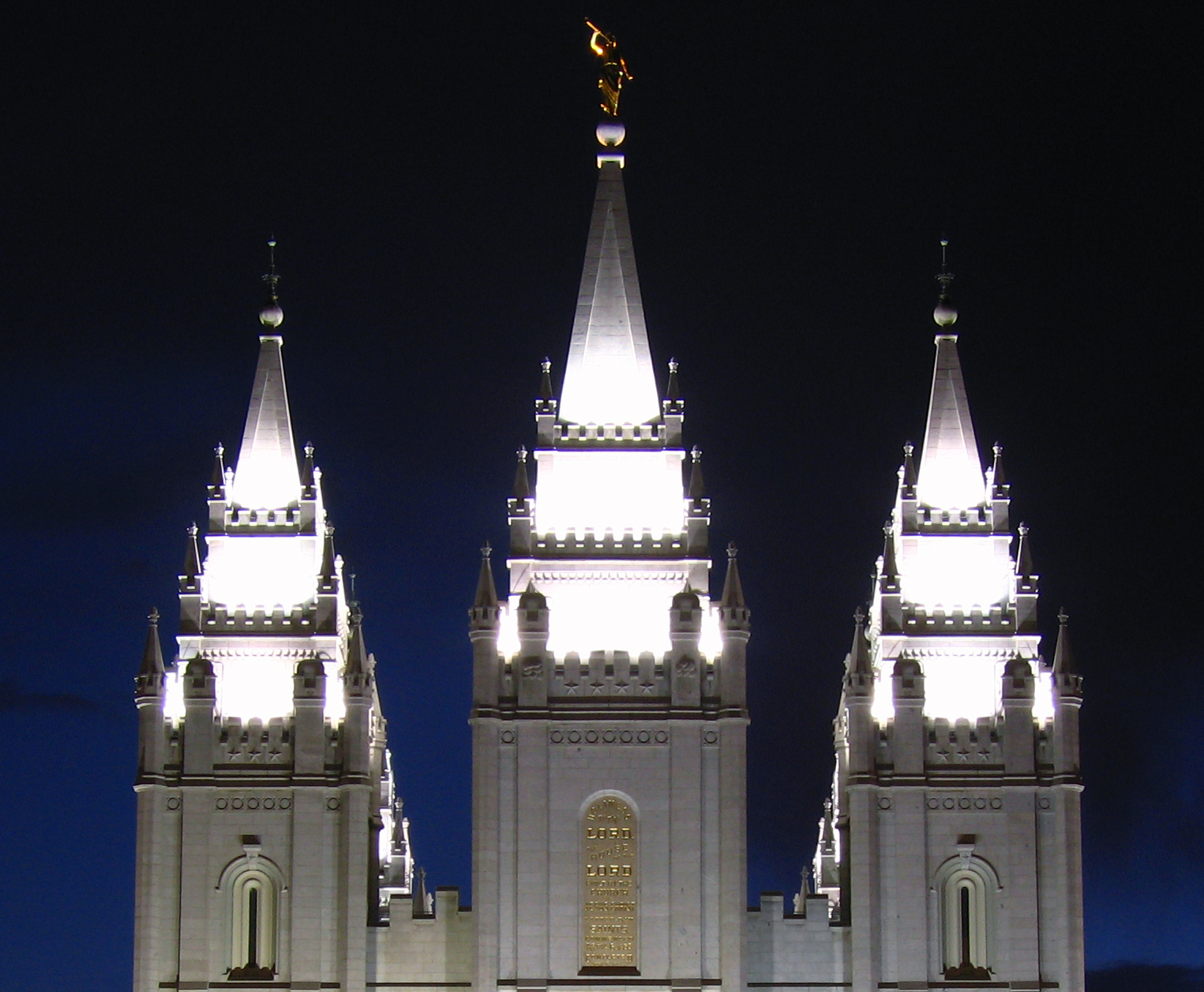
The spires of the Salt Lake Temple at night

== Symbolism in the temple ==
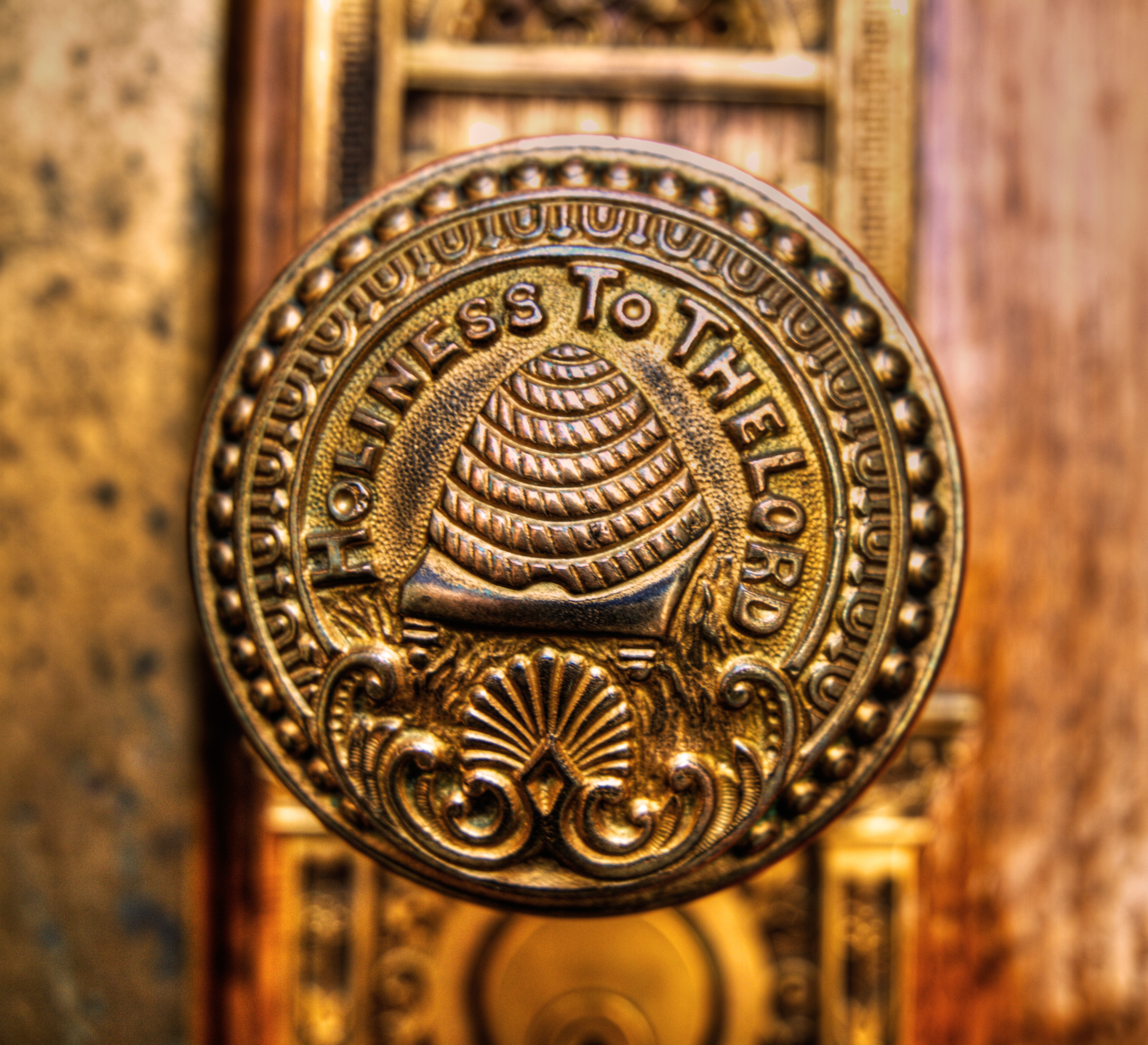
A doorknob of the Salt Lake Temple bearing an image of a beehive and carrying the inscription, "Holiness to the Lord"

Most temples are built facing east, the direction from which Jesus Christ is prophesied to return. The spires and towers on the east end of multi-spired temples are elevated higher than spires and towers on the west side for this same reason, and to represent the Melchizedek, or higher, priesthood.

Some temples, such as Salt Lake, Chicago, and Washington D.C., have triple spires on each side of the temple representing three different offices in both the Melchizedek and Aaronic priesthood.

A statue of the Angel Moroni stands atop many temples built after the Salt Lake Temple. The statue design represents the Latter-day Saint belief that Moroni was the angel spoken of in Revelation 14.

== Temple ordinances ==
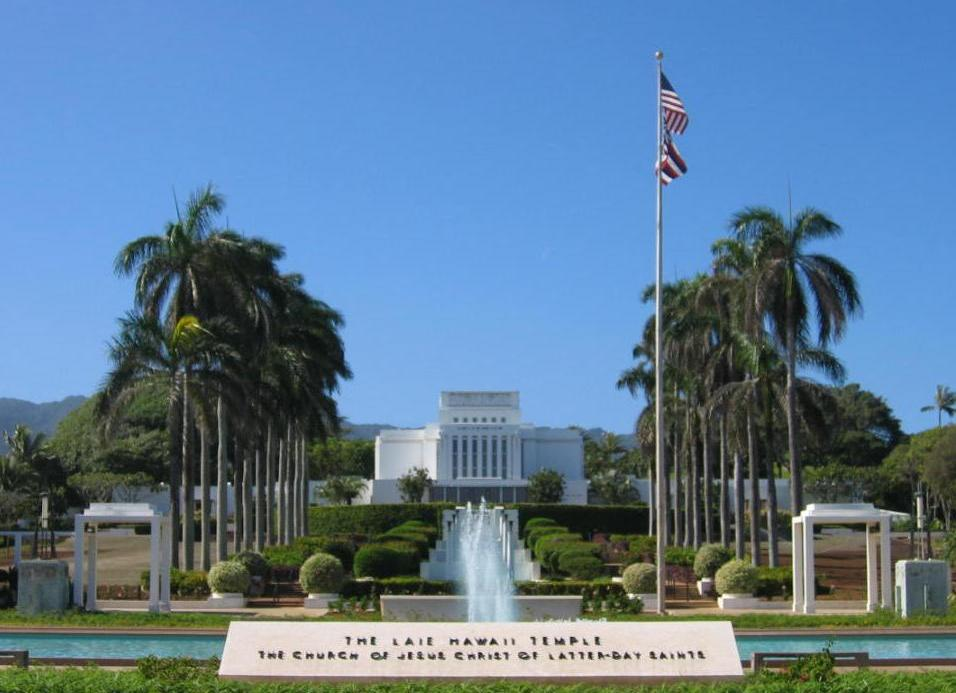
The Laie Hawaii Temple is the fifth oldest Latter-day Saint temple and the first built outside the North American continent. It is also one of three temples designed to look like Solomon's Temple in scripture and one of the few temples without spires.

LDS Church members perform rituals (termed ordinances) within temples. They are taught that temple ordinances are essential to achieving the condition of exaltation after the final judgment. They are also taught that a vast number of dead souls exist in a condition termed as spirit prison, and that a dead individual upon whom the temple ordinances are completed will have a chance to be freed of this imprisoning condition. In this framework ordinances are said to be completed on behalf of either the participant, or a dead individual the same sex as the participant ("on behalf of the dead" or "by proxy").

Ordinances performed in the temple include:

- Baptism and confirmation on behalf of the dead
- Melchizedek priesthood ordination on behalf of deceased men
- Washing and anointing (also known as the "Initiatory" ordinances)
- The endowment
- Sealing ordinances (for opposite-sex couples and for parents and their children)

Most ordinances are performed by proxy only on participants who have already completed the ordinance. Similarly, most ordinances are completed only one time for a participant in a lifetime and all subsequent temple ordinance participation is seen as acting for a dead individual. Baptism, confirmation, and priesthood ordination are usually performed in temples only when on behalf of the dead. The initiatory, endowment, and sealing ceremonies are today performed only within a temple.

The sealing ordinance can be performed on behalf of dead couples; so long as the two living participants are of opposite sex they need not be married. It is also performed on behalf of living couples who wish to be legally married. In this manner, the ordinance is typically performed as a celestial marriage, with the idea the marriage bond lasts after their death, or for "time and all eternity". A "time only" modification can be made to the ordinance, such as when the surviving widow of a celestial marriage wishes to legally remarry.

In addition to the ordinances listed above, 19th-century temples were host to other ordinances that are no longer practiced such as the baptism for health and baptism for renewal of covenants. In 1922, Heber J. Grant discontinued the practice of baptisms for health in the church. The second anointing is a rare, but currently practiced ordinance for live participants, and (less commonly) vicariously for deceased individuals, though, it is usually only given in absolute secrecy to a small number of members after a lifetime of service.

== Entrance requirements ==
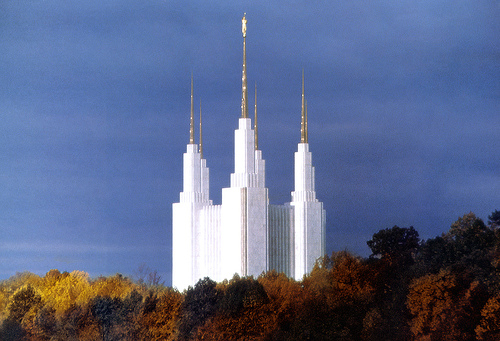
The Washington D.C. Temple is the 16th Latter-day Saint temple.

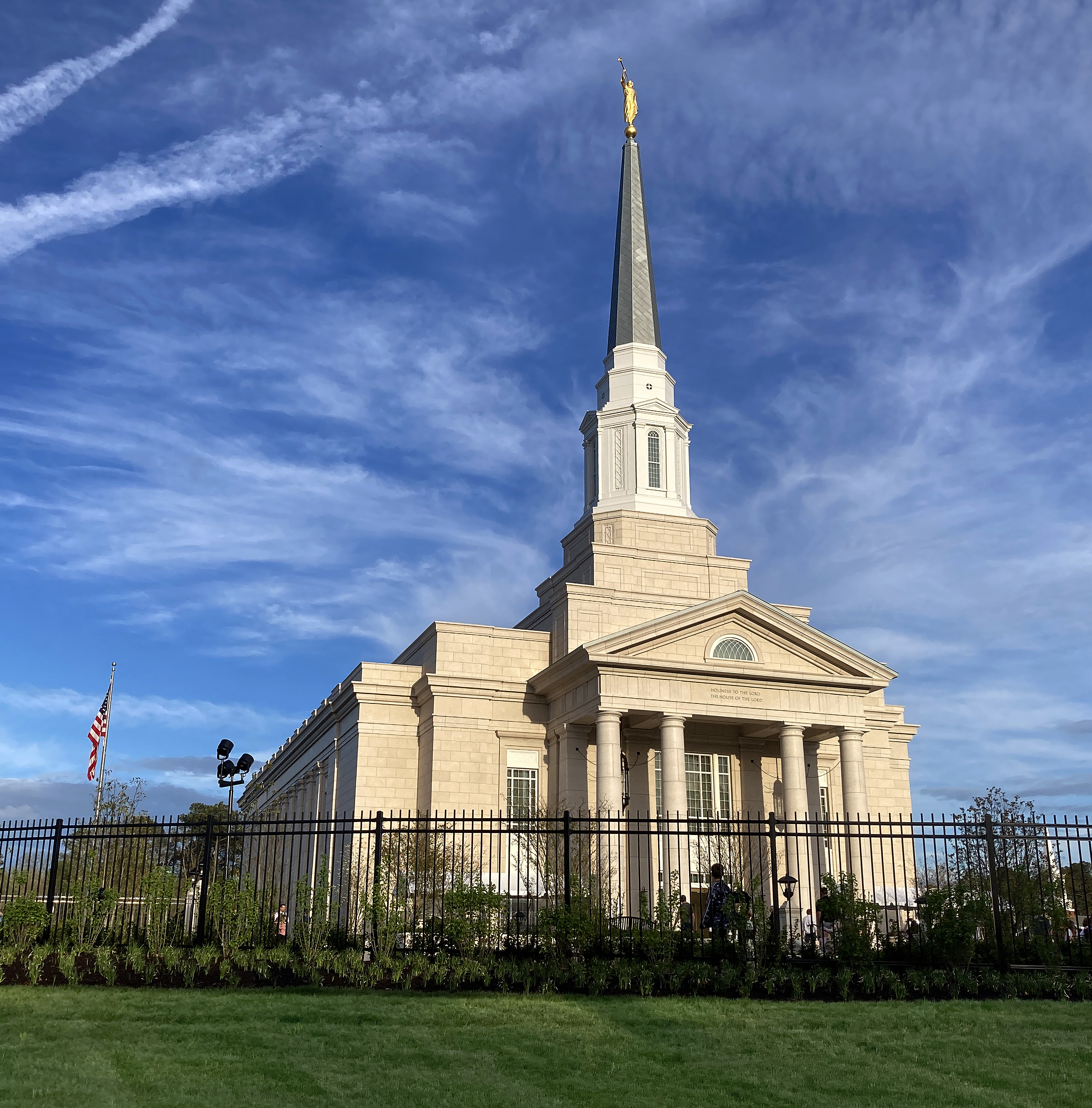
The Richmond Virginia Temple, completed in 2023

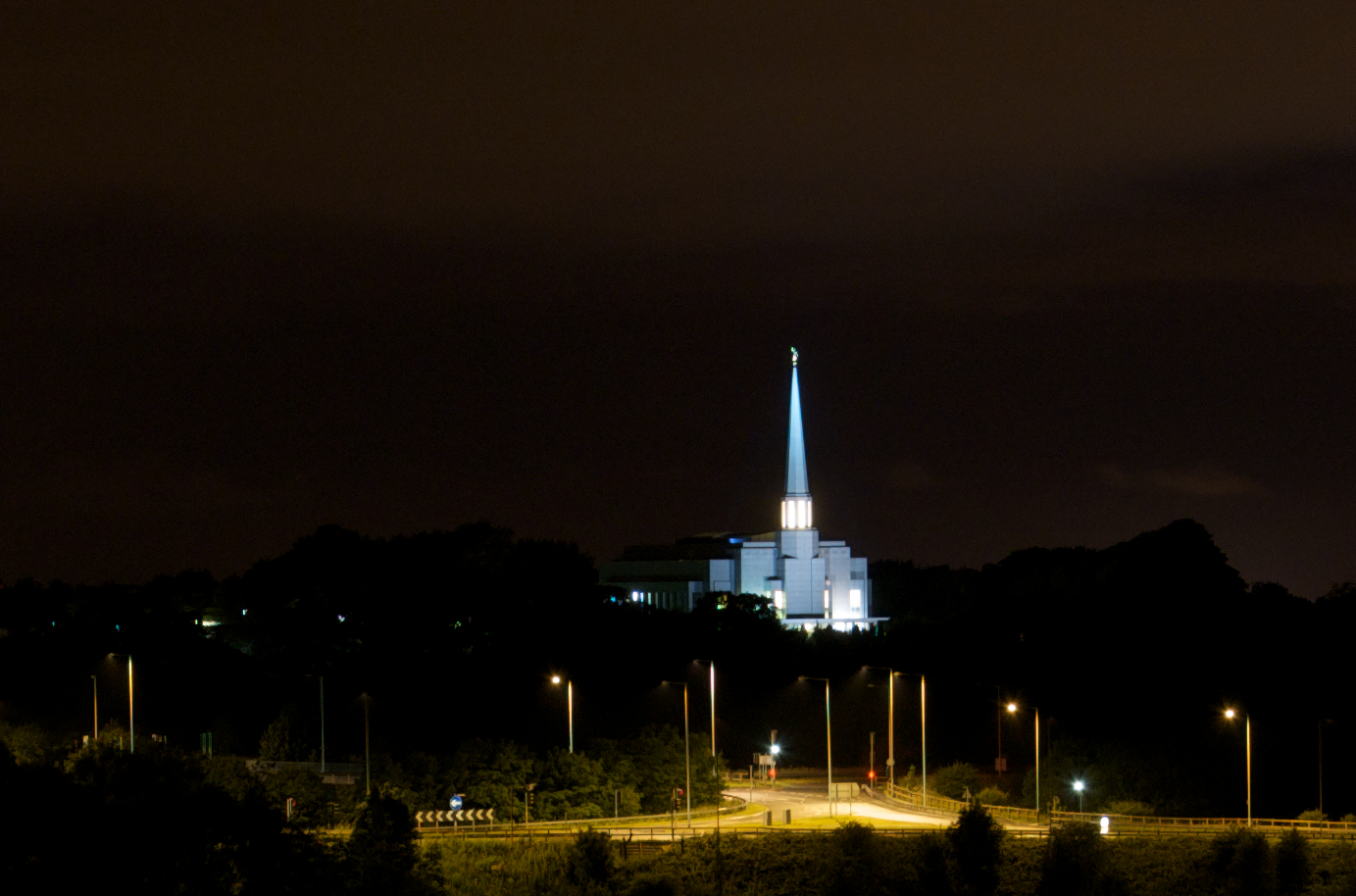
The Preston England Temple, located outside Chorley, Lancashire, England

The LDS Church booklet "Preparing to Enter the Holy Temple" explains that Latter-day Saints "do not discuss the temple ordinances outside the temples".

To enter the temple, an individual must be baptized, and after one year, may seek a temple recommend, which authorizes admission to the temple. The person is interviewed by their bishop, during which the candidate is asked a series of questions to determine worthiness to enter the temple. The individual is also interviewed by their stake president. The bishop and stake president sign the recommend, indicating their approval of that member's worthiness. The individual also signs the recommend, acknowledging the responsibility to remain eligible to hold the recommend. Most recommends are valid for two years.

=== Ineligible groups of members ===
Temple ordinances have historically been unavailable to some members. For about 130 years (between 1847 and 1978) all LDS endowment-related temple ordinances were denied to all Black women and men in a controversial race-based policy. As of 2023, all temple ordinances are unavailable to lesbian, gay, or bisexual persons who are in a same-sex marriage or homosexual relationship, and to all transgender individuals who are transitioning or have transitioned. These restrictions have also garnered criticism from both outside, and inside the LDS church.

=== Worthiness interview ===
To qualify for a temple recommend, an LDS Church member must faithfully answer the following questions which affirm the individual's belief in essential church doctrine, and adherence to essential church practices:

- Faith in and testimony of God the Father, Jesus Christ, and the Holy Ghost.
- Testimony of the atonement of Jesus Christ and his role as personal Savior and Redeemer.
- Testimony of the restoration of the gospel.
- Support of the President of the Church and his authority, and other general authorities and local church leaders.
- Moral cleanliness in thoughts and actions.
- Obeying the law of chastity.
- Following teachings of the church in public and private behavior with family members and others.
- Refraining from supporting or promoting any teaching, practice, or doctrine that conflicts with those of the church.
- Making a good faith effort to keep the Sabbath Day holy; attend meetings; prepare for and worthily partake of the sacrament; live life in accordance with the laws and commandments of the gospel.
- Honesty in everything.
- Paying a full tithe.
- Understanding and obeying the Word of Wisdom.
- Payment of and keeping current on child support or alimony, if applicable.
- If already received the endowment, keeping the covenants made in the temple and wearing the temple garment as instructed in the temple.
- Making a full confession of any serious sins to church leaders.
- Regarding oneself eligible to enter the temple and participate in ordinances therein.

=== History of interview questions ===
A list of questions were first introduced in 1857 and used to qualify whether an individual could enter the Endowment House, before the first temple in Utah was built. They reflected the context of the times, including questions about one's belief in polygamy, branding an animal that one did not own, and using another person's irrigation water.

Since then, the temple recommend questions have changed significantly, though less so in recent years.

- In 1996, the first question about a belief in God, Jesus Christ, and the Holy Ghost was split into three questions. A second question was modified to ask if the member sustained the First Presidency and Quorum of the Twelve as prophets, seers, and revelators. The question about wearing the garments was qualified, adding a clause about wearing them as instructed in the temple.
- In 1999, a simplified question about financial obligations was asked of all members, not just divorced members.
- In October 2019's general conference, church president Russell M. Nelson announced revisions to the temple recommend questions. In addition to some clarifications and streamlining, the question about the law of chastity now includes "striving for moral cleanliness" in thoughts and behavior. The question about attending church meetings was expanded to include a more general question about Sabbath observance.

=== Types of recommends ===
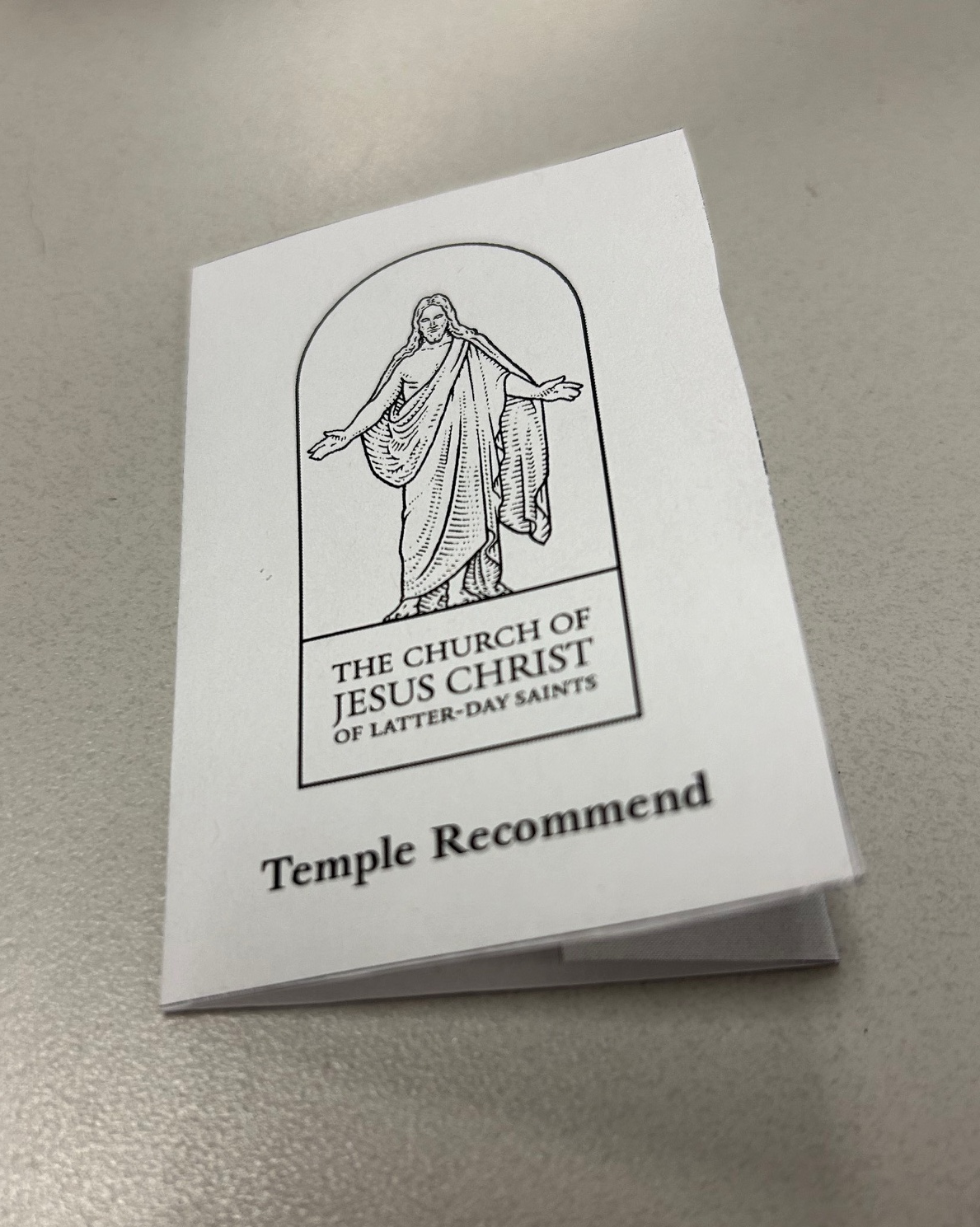
A limited-use temple recommend

The standard temple recommend authorizes a member who has been baptized at least one year prior to take part in all temple ordinances and is valid for two years. A temple recommend can either be in printed form or electronic through an app on a mobile device.

A recommend for living ordinances is given to individuals who are participating in the endowment for the first time, being sealed to a spouse, or anyone being married in the temple for time only. It may only be used in conjunction with a standard temple recommend.

A limited-use recommend is available to members who have not yet received their endowment or who have not been a member for one year. These may also be issued to a group for a single visit to the temple, to youth 11 and older, or to others for specific cases.

=== Emergency access ===
Those without recommends occasionally need to enter temples after dedication during fires, medical emergencies, or building inspections. They are escorted by temple personnel during such visits. Temples may offer introductory tours to new local firefighters and emergency medical technicians during regularly scheduled maintenance periods.

== Temple weddings ==
The LDS temple wedding is a process which culminates in the participation by the couple in a ritual called the sealing ordinance, which involves pronouncing the couple as having a permanent marriage bond which persists even beyond death. This ceremony, among others, is taught as being vital to an individual's and family's exaltation status, following the final judgment.

With the sealing ordinance being held inside a temple, only church members in good standing who have a valid temple recommend are permitted to attend the ceremony. In many nations outside the United States, a civil ceremony, where required by the law of the land, has been immediately followed by a temple sealing.

Converts to the church must wait a year after their own confirmation before entering the temple.

== See also ==
- Council House (Salt Lake City)
- Endowment House
- Holy of Holies (LDS Church)
- List of temples of The Church of Jesus Christ of Latter-day Saints
- Mormon temple controversies
- Mormonism and Freemasonry
