= Sealing power =

In Mormonism, the sealing power is the means whereby all "covenants, contracts, bonds, obligations, oaths, vows, performances, connections, associations, or expectations" attain "efficacy, virtue, or force in and after the resurrection from the dead."

== New Testament references ==
Christ refers to this power in Matthew 16:19 when he says to Peter: "And I will give thee the keys of the kingdom of heaven: and whatsoever thou shalt bind on earth shall be bound in heaven: and whatsoever thou shalt loose on earth shall be loosed in heaven."

This is later repeated in Matthew 18:18: "Verily I say unto you, Whatsoever ye shall bind on earth shall be bound in heaven: and whatsoever ye shall loose on earth shall be loosed in heaven."

== Restoration ==
This power is believed to have been held in Old Testament times by the prophet Elijah, and that he restored this power to Joseph Smith in the Kirtland Temple of the Church of the Latter Day Saints on April 3, 1836 in fulfillment of an Old Testament prophecy in Malachi 4:5-6: "Behold, I will send you Elijah the prophet before the coming of the great and dreadful day of the LORD: and he shall turn the heart of the fathers to the children, and the heart of the children to the fathers, lest I come and smite the earth with a curse."

== Marriage ==
An ordinance where the sealing power is clearly displayed is in marriage. A typical marriage ceremony includes the caveat "until death do you part", whereas marriages performed with the sealing power in a temple can exist beyond death and into heaven. These marriages are referred to as celestial marriages, and are for eternity, not just until death. In this instance, husbands and wives are referred to as being sealed to one another, and the children are sealed to their parents, making an "eternal family."

== See also ==
- Priesthood (Latter Day Saints)
- Second anointing
