= General authority =

Role and rank in the Church of Jesus Christ of Latter-day Saints

A general authority is a member of the highest levels of leadership within the Church of Jesus Christ of Latter-day Saints who has administrative and ecclesiastical authority over the church. A general authority's jurisdiction is church-wide, in contrast to the responsibilities of a local authority or an area authority, which relate to a particular area, unit, or department of the church. As a group, the general authorities are often referred to as "the Brethren." As of October 2025, the church listed 130 general authorities.

== Composition and distinction from general officers ==
By definition, general authorities are members of the church's priesthood. In order of precedence, the general authorities include the members of the following leadership organizations:

Organization	Membership	Title given to members (e.g., Title Smith or Title John J. Smith)	Tenure
First Presidency	President of the Church and his chosen counselors	President	President of the Church: Life; Counselors: Until own death, death of the President of the Church, or release at the discretion of the president
Quorum of the Twelve Apostles	12 apostles	Elder; president or acting president of the Quorum: President	Typically life; may be removed from Quorum to join First Presidency
Presidency of the Seventy	7 seventies, typically drawn from the First or Second Quorum of the Seventy	Elder	Variable (usually 5–8 years); until release at the discretion of the church president; may remain a member of the First or Second Quorum of the Seventy when released
First Quorum of the Seventy	Up to 70 seventies	Elder	Life; will typically be relieved of active duties and granted emeritus status around age 70
Second Quorum of the Seventy	Up to 70 seventies	Elder	Variable (usually 5–7 years); until release at the discretion of the church president
Presiding Bishopric	3 bishops: one presiding bishop and two counselors	Bishop	Variable (usually 9–12 years); until release at the discretion of the church president; will typically become a member of the First Quorum of the Seventy upon their release
Presiding Patriarch	Defunct (was 1 patriarch)	Elder	Defunct; Life; In 1979, Eldred G. Smith was released from active duties and given general authority emeritus status. A new presiding patriarch has not been called since his death in 2013.
Assistants to the Quorum of the Twelve Apostles	Defunct (was variable)	Elder	Defunct; All Assistants to the Twelve were added to the First Quorum of the Seventy in 1976 and the position was eliminated.

Not all church leaders with church-wide responsibility are considered general authorities. The general presidencies of the church's organizations, which are sustained as general officers of the church, but are not general authorities, include the general presidencies of the following organizations:

- Young Men
- Sunday School
- Relief Society
- Young Women
- Primary

The latter three groups are composed of women and represent the only three organizations in which women are given church-wide authority.

Also excluded from the definition of general authorities are members of the Third through the Twelfth Quorums of the Seventy, who are called area seventies and have responsibilities within a limited geographical area, not church-wide authority.

Until 2004, general leadership for the Sunday School and Young Men organizations had historically been filled by general authorities. However, in the church's April 2004 general conference, Thomas S. Monson, of the First Presidency, announced that "a recent decision [has been made] that members of the Quorums of the Seventy [will] not serve in the general presidencies of the Sunday School and Young Men."

Due to this change, no general organization presidencies are composed of general authority seventies. Rather, the general authorities remain active in general church committees and have less jurisdiction over local stakes. Generally, stake presidents now report to area seventies, who in turn report to area presidencies, which are usually composed of general authority seventies.

Typically, general authorities are given the sealing power, while general officers and area seventies are not.

== Tenure ==
A person is typically called to be a general authority or general officer by a member of the First Presidency or the Quorum of the Twelve. The president of the church and members of the Quorum of the Twelve are typically called for life, although there have been more than a dozen instances when an apostle has been released from his service in the Quorum of the Twelve due to disfellowshipment, excommunication, or resignation.

As with any calling in the church, general authorities and general officers serve "until they are released." In current church practice, men called to the First Quorum of the Seventy typically remain general authorities for life, but are granted emeritus status in the October following their seventieth birthday. Members of the Second Quorum of the Seventy are typically called for a period of five to seven years. When members of the Second Quorum are released, they are no longer general authorities of the church. When members of the Presiding Bishopric are released, they typically become members of the First Quorum of the Seventy and are therefore retained as lifetime general authorities, including later being granted emeritus status.

== Common consent ==
In the church's biannual general conferences, held in April and October, all the general authorities and general officers of the church are presented to the Latter-day Saints for a sustaining vote, in accordance with the church's interpretation of the principle of "common consent." This is a voluntary indication made by each member (usually by raising the right hand) that the member assents to be led by the individuals presented as general authorities and general officers. Members of the First Presidency and Quorum of the Twelve Apostles are always named by name, as are any persons being added or released from a position or any general authority or general officer moving from one organization to another (e.g., a member of the First Quorum of the Seventy being called to the Presidency of the Seventy). Otherwise, the general authorities and general officers of the church are simply sustained "as presently constituted".

This biannual procedure is dictated by church theology, which states that the church shall be governed by the common consent of its membership.

== See also ==
- Council on the Disposition of the Tithes
- List of general authorities of The Church of Jesus Christ of Latter-day Saints
