= Sealing (Mormonism) =

Latter Day Saint ordinance (ritual)

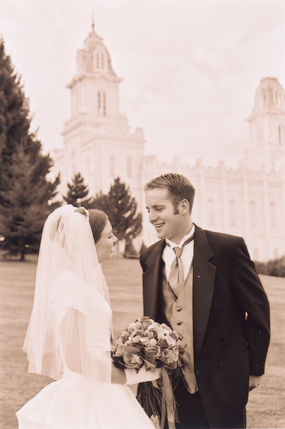
A couple following their marriage in the Manti Utah Temple.

Sealing is an ordinance (ritual) performed in Latter Day Saint temples by a person holding the sealing authority. The purpose of this ordinance is to seal familial relationships, making possible the existence of family relationships throughout eternity. Sealings are typically performed as marriages or as sealing of children to parents. They were performed prior to the death of Joseph Smith (the founder of the Latter Day Saint movement), and subsequently performed in the largest of the faiths that came from the movement, the Church of Jesus Christ of Latter-day Saints (LDS Church). LDS Church teachings place great importance on the specific authority required to perform these sealings. Church doctrine teaches that this authority, called the priesthood, corresponds to that given to Saint Peter in Matthew 16:19. This ritual may be performed by living people for themselves, and also by proxy for eligible dead people.

== Sealings ==
Faithful Latter Day Saints believe civil marriages are dissolved at death, but that a couple who has been sealed in a temple will be married beyond physical death and the resurrection if they remain faithful. This means that in the afterlife they and their family will be together forever. An illustrative difference in the marriage ceremony performed in the LDS Church's temples is the replacement of the words "until death do us part" with "for time and all eternity".

The LDS Church recognizes other monogamous, heterosexual marriages, both civil and religious, although they believe that such marriages will not continue after death because eternal marriages must be performed by priesthood authority. Eternal marriages are also performed vicariously for the deceased, of effect after receiving all other saving ordinances. As with sealings of living persons, they are sealed with their spouse and their children.

Couples who have children born to them before being sealed may have their children sealed to them afterwards. Couples who have children after being sealed need not have their children sealed to them in a separate ceremony. Children born to sealed parents are born in the covenant and are automatically sealed to their parents. Adopted children may be sealed to their adoptive parents once the adoption has been legally finalized.

The union of a sealed couple is regarded as valid only if both individuals have kept their religious covenants and followed Christ's teachings. Just as deceased individuals may refuse any temple ordinance (such as a sealing) done by proxy on their behalf, couples, parents, and children who were sealed to each other in life may refuse to accept a sealing of which they were a part. No one will be sealed to any one with whom they do not want to be sealed.

Only worthy members of the LDS Church, who hold current valid temple recommends, can attend and witness sealings. Non-member family and friends generally wait in the temple waiting room during the sealing ceremony.

Since the LDS Church rejects same-sex marriages, these unions are not performed in temples and are not recognized by the church.

== Ceremony and vows ==
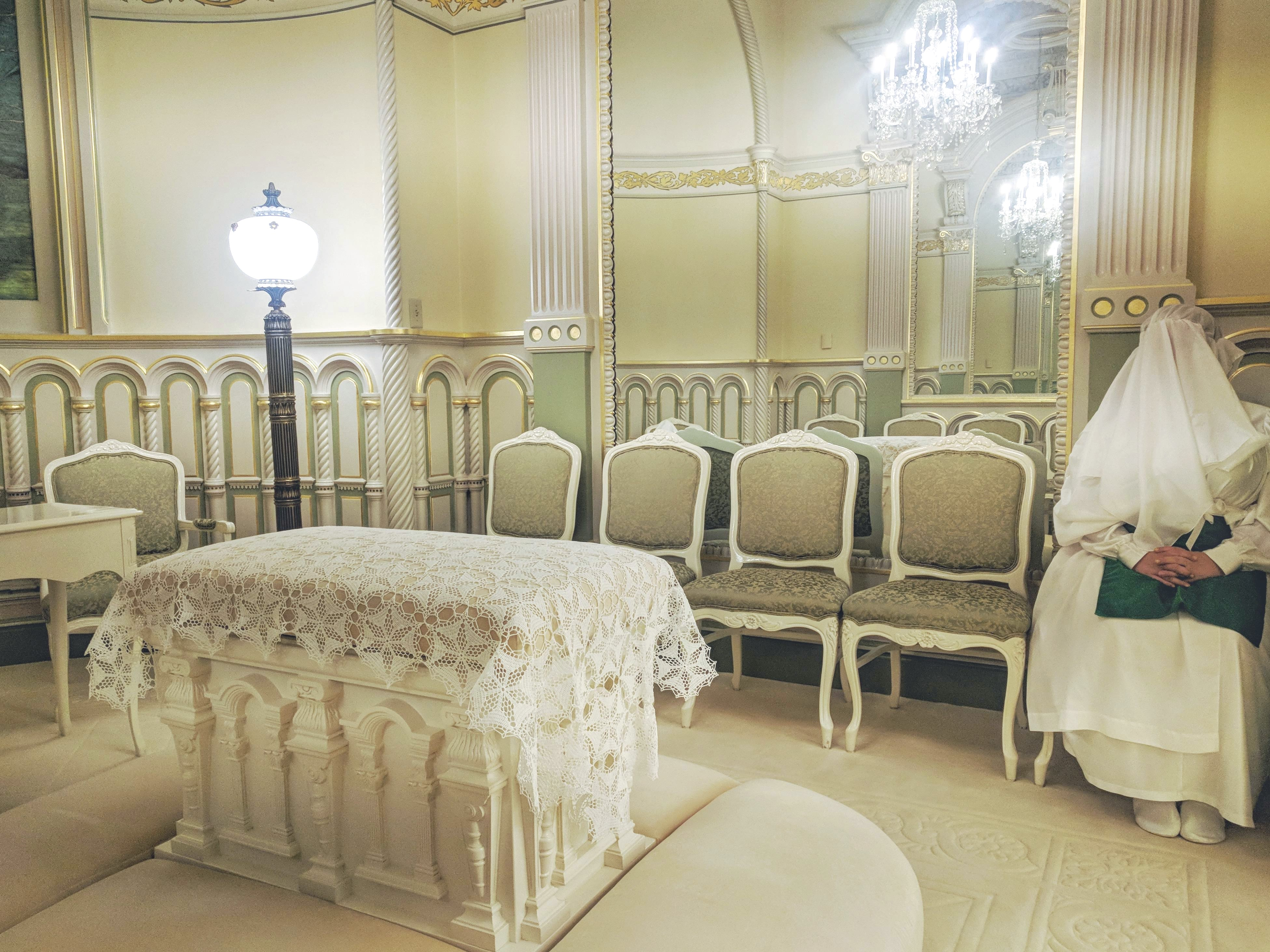
A woman in ceremonial temple clothing used during the wedding ceremony sits next to the sealing room altar over which the sealings are performed. The infinite reflection of the double mirrors is seen in the background.

A temple sealing for a living couple has the man and woman kneel on opposite sides of an altar in a temple sealing room while wearing ceremonial temple robes. They grasp each other's right hand while facing double mirrors that create an infinite reflection. The male sealer then reads the following vows to groom (and then repeats the same vows with the changes noted in parentheses) to which they are to respond "yes".

Brother [last name], do you take Sister [last name] by the right hand and receive her unto yourself to be your lawfully wedded wife (give yourself to him to be his lawfully wedded wife, and receive him to be your lawfully wedded husband), for time and all eternity, with a covenant and promise that you will observe and keep all the laws, rites, and ordinances pertaining to this holy order of matrimony in the new and everlasting covenant; and this you do in the presence of God, angels, and these witnesses of your own free will and choice?

They are then pronounced husband and wife and promised blessings.

== Civil recognition ==
Not all countries recognize marriages performed by clergy outside of the state religion. In these cases, temple marriages are not seen as legally binding, and a civil marriage must also be performed. In other cases, marriages must be performed in a public forum for any to witness or formally object. In such circumstances, government representatives or authorized clergy will perform the civilly-recognized public wedding prior to the temple sealing.

- In the United States and some other countries, bishops, stake presidents, and temple sealers have the civil authority to perform marriages. Marriages performed in the temple by a temple sealer are recognized by the government.
- In the United Kingdom the law requires that a marriage be performed at a public ceremony (the same also holds true for Austria). Since attendance at a temple sealing is restricted, a couple will be married locally by a person who is duly authorized to perform marriages. This person will usually be a registrar of marriages. The marriage can be performed at the local registrar's office, or in some cases at an LDS meetinghouse. Some bishops or branch presidents have been officially given the title of a deputy registrar, and as such are legally able to perform a civil ceremony in the meetinghouse. The couple will then travel to the nearest LDS temple (London or Preston) for their temple sealing.
- In Brazil, all marriages must be performed in the state in which the couple resides. Since not all Brazilian states have a temple within their boundaries, the couple may then have their sealing performed at the nearest temple upon completion of the civil marriage. Also, according to Brazilian law, the sealing is recognized by the government as long as it respects the requirements for a civil marriage.
- In several countries (e.g. Argentina, Mexico, Germany) all marriages are performed at the local municipality by a registrar who is duly authorized to perform marriages. The couple will then go to the temple to have the sealing ordinance performed.

In May 2019, the LDS Church removed a prior one-year waiting period of couples deemed to be worthy between civil and temple marriage. In countries where a civil ceremony is required before marriage, the couples must receive their sealing as soon as practical after the civil ceremony.

== Cancellation ==
Although a divorce dissolves a civilly recognized marriage, the church still recognizes a sealing as binding. A couple who has been sealed may request to have their sealing canceled, which generally only occurs under special circumstances, and is only granted by the church's president. Some refer to this informally as a "temple divorce", but the terminology designated by church leaders is "cancellation of a sealing". If a sealing is canceled, the sealing between them and any children remains in force, though the couple is no longer sealed. The sealing together of husband and wife and the sealing of children to parents are separate ordinances.

A cancellation typically follows after a civil divorce when a woman seeks to be sealed to another man. A man must apply for a sealing clearance to marry another woman after he has been civilly divorced, even if he has already received a cancellation of sealing.

== Legacy of plural marriage ==
It has been argued that the LDS Church's policy on sealings and cancellations reflect its doctrine of plural marriage. Although plural marriage is currently prohibited in the church, a man can be sealed to multiple women, in the case of widowers who are sealed to both their deceased and living wives. Additionally, men who are dead may be sealed by proxy to all women to whom they were legally married while alive. Recent changes in church policy also allow women to be sealed to multiple men, but only after both she and her husband(s) are dead.

LDS Church doctrine is not entirely specific on the status of men or women who are sealed by proxy to multiple spouses. There are at least two possibilities:

1. Regardless of how many people a man or woman is sealed to by proxy, they will only remain with one of them in the afterlife, and that the remaining spouses, who might still merit the full benefits of exaltation that come from being sealed, would then be given to another person in order to ensure each has an eternal marriage.
2. These sealings create effective plural marriages that will continue after death. There are no church teachings clarifying whether polyandrous relationships can exist in the afterlife, so some church members doubt whether this possibility would apply to women who are sealed by proxy to multiple spouses. The possibility for women to be sealed to multiple men is a recent policy change enacted in 1998. Church leaders have neither explained this change, nor its doctrinal implications. Proxy sealings, like proxy baptisms, are merely offered to the person in the afterlife.

== See also ==
- Celestial marriage
- Law of adoption (Mormonism)
- Marriage in The Church of Jesus Christ of Latter-day Saints
- Posthumous marriage: Mormonism
- Sealing power
- Sealing room

== General references ==
- Bergera, Gary James (2002), "The Earliest Eternal Sealings for Civilly Married Couples Living and Dead", Dialogue: A Journal of Mormon Thought, 35 (3): 41–66.
- Buerger, David John (1983), "The Fulness of the Priesthood": The Second Anointing in Latter-day Saint Theology and Practice", Dialogue: A Journal of Mormon Thought, 16 (1): 10–44, doi:10.2307/45225125, JSTOR 45225125
