= Mormonism =

Doctrine in the Latter Day Saint movement

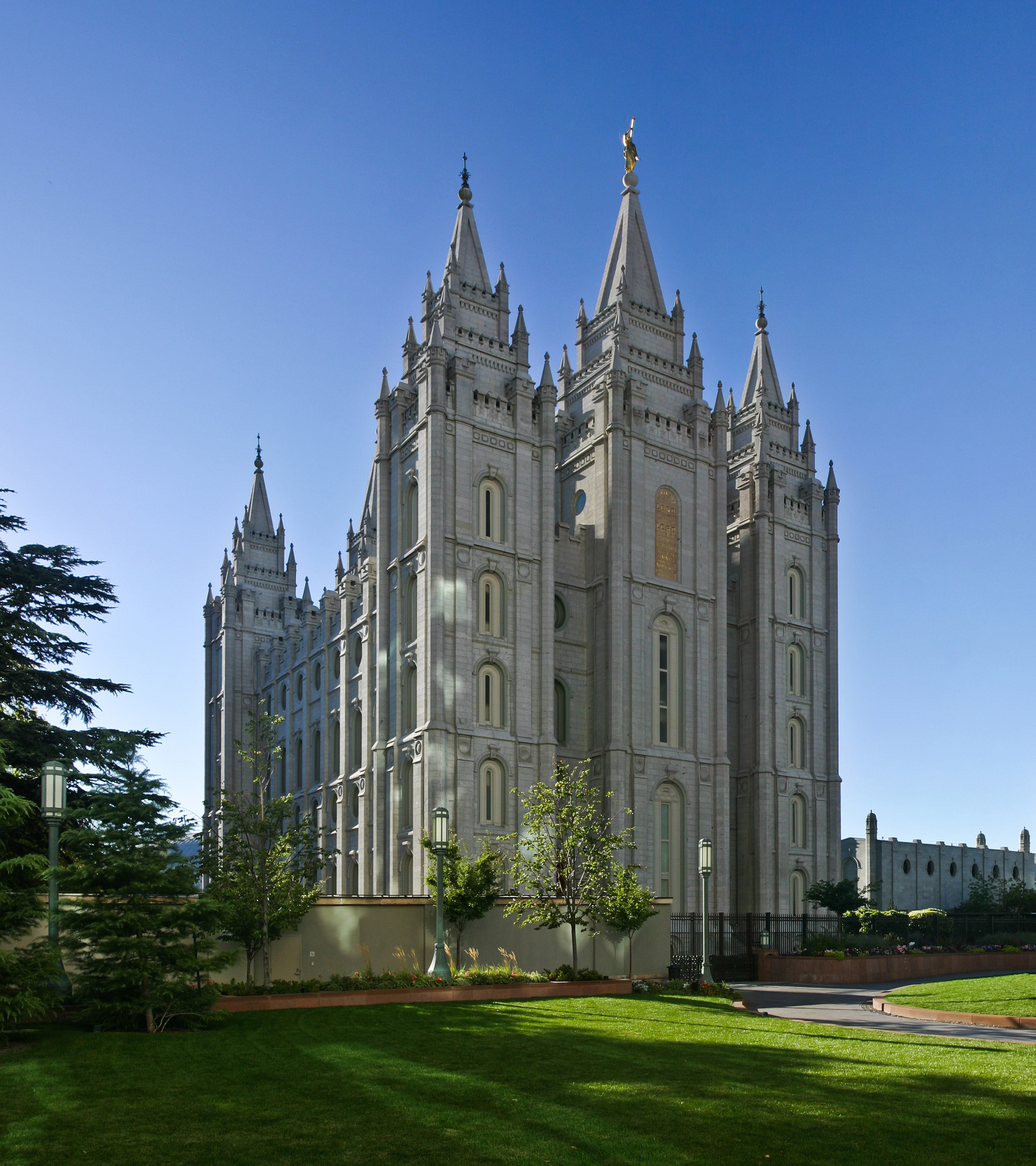
The Salt Lake Temple, a temple of the Church of Jesus Christ of Latter-day Saints in Salt Lake City, Utah

Mormonism is the theology and religious tradition of the Latter Day Saint movement of Restorationist Christianity started by Joseph Smith in Western New York in the 1820s and 1830s. As a label, Mormonism has been applied to various aspects of the Latter Day Saint movement, although since 2018 there has been a push from the Church of Jesus Christ of Latter-day Saints (LDS Church) to distance itself from this label.

A prominent feature of Mormon theology is the Book of Mormon, a 19th-century text which describes itself as a chronicle of early Indigenous peoples of the Americas and their dealings with God. Mormon theology combines mainstream Christian beliefs with modifications stemming from belief in revelations to Smith and other religious leaders. This includes the use of and belief in the Bible and other religious texts, including the Doctrine and Covenants and the Pearl of Great Price. Mormonism includes significant doctrines of eternal marriage, eternal progression, baptism for the dead, sexual purity, health, fasting, Sabbath observance, and formerly, plural marriage.

The theology itself is not uniform; as early as 1831, and most significantly after Smith's death, various groups split from the Church of Christ that Smith established. One source estimated over 400 denominations have sprung from founder Joseph Smith's original movement. Other than differences in leadership, these groups most significantly differ in their stances on polygamy, which the Utah-based LDS Church banned in 1890, and Trinitarianism, which the LDS Church does not affirm. The branch of theology which seeks to maintain the practice of polygamy is known as Mormon fundamentalism and includes several different churches. Other groups affirm Trinitarianism, such as the Community of Christ (formerly the Reorganized Church of Jesus Christ of Latter Day Saints), and describe their doctrine as Trinitarian Christian restorationist.

Cultural Mormonism is a term coined by cultural Mormons who identify with the culture, especially present in much of the American West, but do not necessarily identify with the theology.

== Historical overview ==
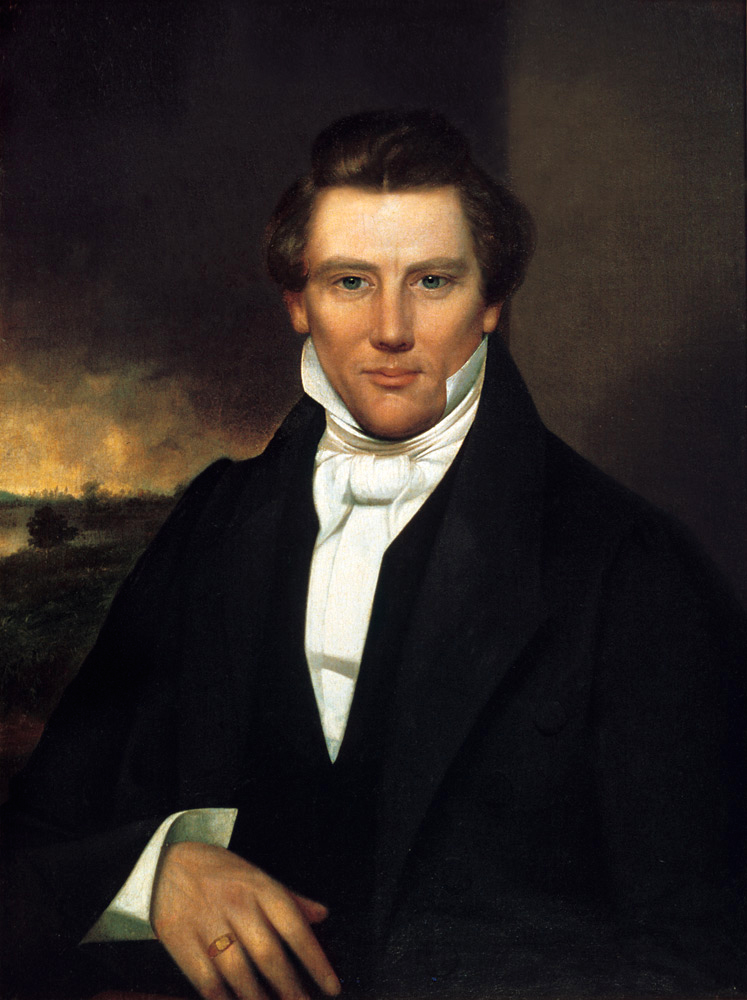
Joseph Smith, the founder of the Mormon movement.

The doctrines of Mormonism began with the farmboy Joseph Smith in the 1820s in Western New York during a period of religious excitement known as the Second Great Awakening. Smith, at 14 years old, was determined to find out which church taught the "true" doctrine of God. He believed that God existed, but was confused by what he believed to be contradictions in the beliefs of churches available to him. In Joseph Smith-History, he wrote: "While I was laboring under the extreme difficulties caused by the contests of these parties of religionists, I was one day reading the Epistle of James, first chapter and fifth verse, which reads: 'If any of you lack wisdom, let him ask of God, that giveth to all men liberally, and upbraideth not; and it shall be given him.'" After praying about which denomination he should join, Smith said he received a vision in the spring of 1820. Called the "First Vision", Smith said that God the Father and his son, Jesus Christ, appeared to him and instructed him to join none of the existing churches because they were all wrong. During the 1820s, Smith chronicled several angelic visitations, and was eventually told (by the angels) that God would use him to re-establish the "true Christian church."

In 1830 Smith published the Book of Mormon which he claimed to have translated from ancient writings found on golden plates. He said an angel first showed him the location of the plates in 1823, buried in a nearby hill. After obtaining the plates in 1827, Smith began dictating the text of the Book of Mormon in April 1828 with the assistance of Martin Harris and later Oliver Cowdery. After several interruptions, Smith completed the manuscript in June 1829. Smith said the plates were returned to the angel after he finished the translation.

The Book of Mormon claims to be a chronicle of early Israelites who left the Near East and traveled to the Americas. The book begins c. 600 BC with the departure from Jerusalem of the family of a prophet named Lehi, and their sailing to the Americas. It tells of people in the Americas (presumably Native Americans) with a belief in Jesus hundreds of years before his birth; their witnessing Jesus's personal visitation to them after his resurrection; and of their eventually losing Christianity after generations of wars and apostasy. According to Smith, the Book of Mormon and other revelations would be the means of establishing correct doctrine for a restored church. Smith began baptizing new converts in 1829, and formally organized the Church of Christ in 1830. Smith was seen by his followers as a modern-day prophet.

The early church encountered criticism and persecution from residents of Palmyra, New York and surrounding several towns when they began to organize. To avoid confrontation, Smith and the early church members, known as Mormons, moved West to Kirtland, Ohio, and Jackson County, Missouri where they hoped to establish a permanent New Jerusalem or City of Zion. However, they were expelled from Jackson County in 1833 and fled to other parts of Missouri. In 1838, fighting between the Missourians and Mormons resulted in the governor of Missouri issuing an "extermination order" against the Mormons, forcing them to flee the state. The displaced church relocated to Illinois where under Smith's direction, the church bought a small town, renamed it Nauvoo, and lived with a degree of peace and prosperity for a few years. However, tensions between Mormons and their neighbors again escalated. In 1844 Smith was killed by a mob, precipitating a succession crisis.

The largest group of Mormons, now called the Church of Jesus Christ of Latter-day Saints, followed Brigham Young as the new prophet and, under his direction, emigrated to what became the Utah Territory. There, the church began the open practice of plural marriage, a form of religious polygamy which Smith had instituted in Nauvoo. Polygamy became the faith's most sensational characteristic during the 19th century, and vigorous opposition by the United States Congress threatened the church's existence as a legal institution. Further, polygamy was also a major cause for the opposition to Mormonism in the states of Idaho and Arizona. In the 1890 Manifesto, church president Wilford Woodruff announced the official end of plural marriage.

Due to this formal abolition of plural marriage, several small groups broke from the LDS Church forming many smaller Mormon fundamentalist denominations. During the latter half of the 20th century the LDS Church grew rapidly, going from about 1.7 million members in 1960 to around 7.7 million members in 1990. Growth since then has slowed, and the church claimed a membership of 16 million in 2020.

== Theology ==
=== Nature of God ===
In orthodox Mormonism, the term God generally refers to the biblical God the Father, whom Latter Day Saints refer to as Elohim, and the term Godhead refers to a council of three distinct divine persons consisting of God the Father, Jesus (his firstborn Son, whom Latter Day Saints refer to as Jehovah), and the Holy Ghost. Latter Day Saints believe that the Father, Son, and Holy Ghost are three distinct beings, and that the Father and Jesus have perfected, glorified, physical bodies, while the Holy Ghost is a spirit without a physical body. Latter Day Saints also believe that there are other gods and goddesses outside the Godhead, such as a Heavenly Mother—who is married to God the Father—and that faithful Latter-day Saints may attain godhood in the afterlife. Joseph Smith taught that God was once a man on another planet before being exalted to Godhood.

This conception differs from the traditional Christian Trinity in several ways, one of which is that Mormonism has not adopted or continued to hold the doctrine of the Nicene Creed, that the Father, Son, and Holy Ghost are of the same substance or being. Also, Mormonism teaches that the intelligence dwelling in each human is coeternal with God. Mormons use the term omnipotent to describe God, and regard him as the creator: they understand him as being almighty and eternal but subject to eternal natural law which governs intelligences, justice and the eternal nature of matter (i.e. God organized the world but did not create it from nothing). The Mormon conception of God also differs substantially from the Jewish tradition of ethical monotheism in which elohim (אֱלֹהִים) is a completely different conception.

This description of God represents the Mormon orthodoxy, formalized in 1915 based on earlier teachings. Other currently existing and historical branches of Mormonism have adopted different views of god, such as the Adam–God doctrine and Trinitarianism.

=== Restoration ===
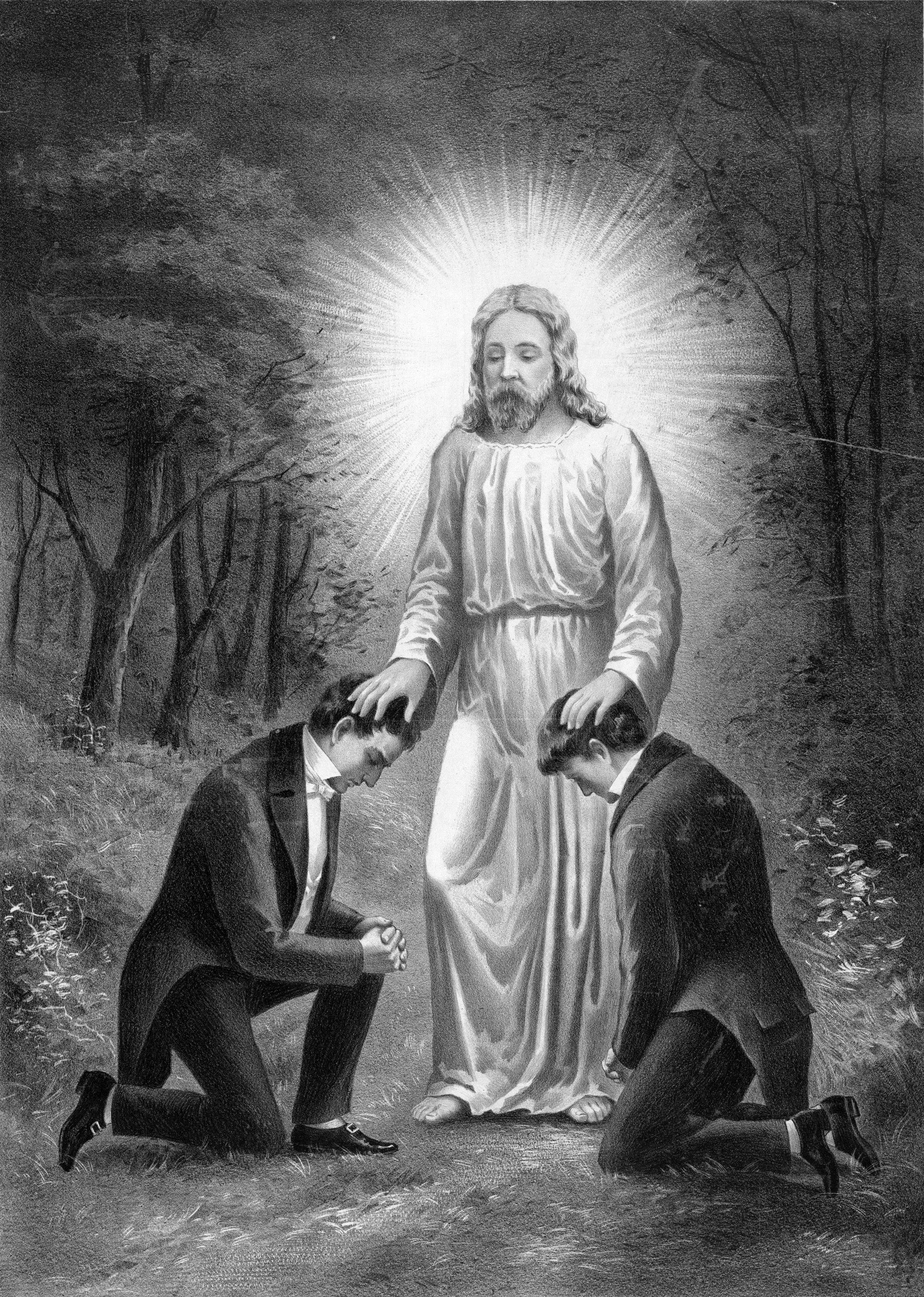
A depiction of Joseph Smith and Oliver Cowdery receiving priesthood authority from John the Baptist

Mormonism describes itself as falling within world Christianity, but as a distinct restored dispensation; it characterizes itself as the only true form of the Christian religion since the time of a "Great Apostasy" that began not long after the ascension of Jesus Christ. According to Mormons this apostasy involved the corruption of the pure, original Christian doctrine with Greek and other philosophies, and followers dividing into different ideological groups. Additionally, Mormons claim the martyrdom of the Apostles led to the loss of Priesthood authority to administer the Church and its ordinances.

Mormons believe that God re-established the 1st-century early Christian church as found in the New Testament through the restoration of Joseph Smith. In particular, Mormons believe that angels such as Peter, James, John, and John the Baptist appeared to Joseph Smith and others and bestowed various Priesthood authorities on them. Mormons thus believe that their Church is the "only true and living church" because divine authority was restored to it through Smith. In addition, Mormons believe that Smith and his legitimate successors are modern prophets who receive revelation from God to guide the church. They maintain that other Christian religions have a portion of the truth and are guided by the light of Christ.

=== Cosmology ===
Smith's cosmology is laid out mostly in Smith's later revelations and sermons—particularly the Book of Abraham, the Book of Moses, and the King Follett discourse. Mormon cosmology presents a unique view of God and the universe and places high importance on human agency. In Mormonism, life on earth is just a short part of an eternal existence. Mormons believe that in the beginning, all people existed as spirits or "intelligences" in the presence of God. In this state, God proposed a plan of salvation whereby they could progress and "have a privilege to advance like himself." The spirits were free to accept or reject this plan, and a "third" of them, led by Satan rejected it. The rest accepted the plan, coming to earth and receiving bodies with an understanding that they would experience sin and suffering.

In Mormonism, the central part of God's plan is the atonement of Jesus Christ. Mormons believe that one purpose of earthly life is to learn to choose good over evil. In this process, people inevitably make mistakes, becoming unworthy to return to the presence of God. Mormons believe that Jesus paid for the sins of the world and that all people can be saved through his atonement. Mormons accept Christ's atonement through faith, repentance, formal covenants or ordinances such as baptism, and consistently trying to live a Christ-like life.

According to Mormon scripture, the Earth's creation was not ex nihilo, but organized from existing matter. The Earth is just one of many inhabited worlds, and there are many governing heavenly bodies, including the planet or star Kolob, which is said to be nearest the throne of God.

=== America ===
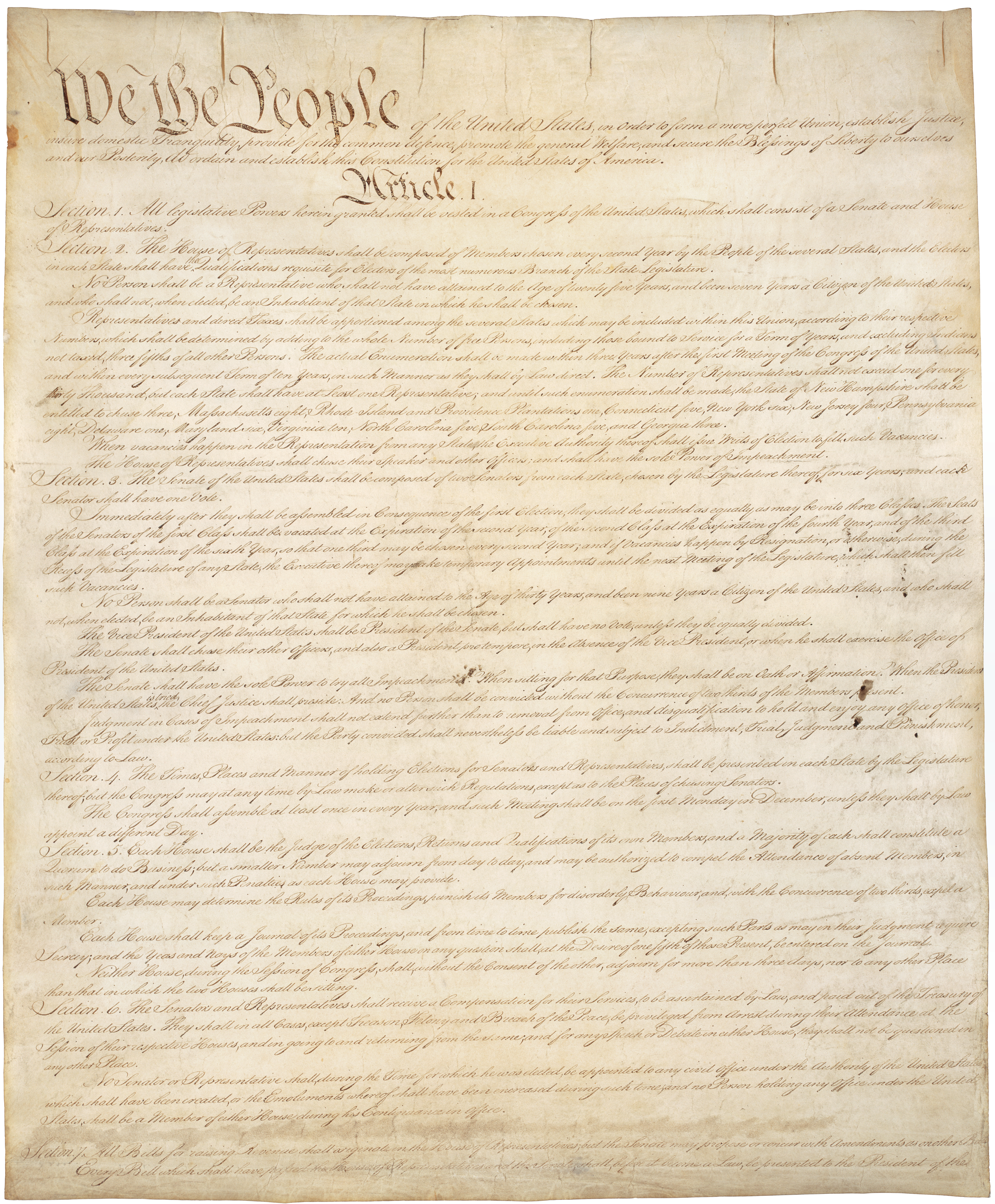
Mormons believe that the U.S. Constitution is the result of divine inspiration. Fundamentalists believe in the related White Horse Prophecy.

Mormon theology teaches that the United States is a unique place and that Mormons are God's chosen people, selected for a singular destiny. The Book of Mormon alludes to the United States as being the Biblical promised land, with the Constitution of the United States being divinely inspired, and argues that America is an exceptional nation.

In Upstate New York in 1823, Joseph Smith claimed to have had a vision in which the Angel Moroni told him about engraved golden plates buried in a nearby hill. According to Smith, he received subsequent instruction from Moroni and, four years later, excavated the plates and translated them from "reformed Egyptian" into English; the resultant Book of Mormon—so called after an ancient American prophet who, according to Smith, had compiled the text recorded on the golden plates—recounts the history of a tribe of Israelites, led by the prophet Lehi, who migrated from Jerusalem to the Americas in the 7th century BCE. In Mormonism, these Israelite tribes who migrated to the Americas centuries before the birth of Jesus Christ are considered to be among the ancestors of pre-Columbian Native Americans.

Joseph Smith argued that the millennial New Jerusalem was to be built in America (10th Article of Faith). In the Doctrine and Covenants, Smith records God as saying "it is not right that any man should be in bondage one to another. And for this purpose have I established the Constitution of this land, by the hands of wise men whom I raised up unto this very purpose, and redeemed the land by the shedding of blood" (D&C 101:79–80). To Mormons, this places America as the originator of religious liberty and freedom, while noting a need to expand these American values worldwide.

Although officially shunned by the LDS Church, fundamentalist Mormons believe in the White Horse Prophecy, which argues that Mormons will be called upon to preserve the Constitution as it hangs "by a thread".

=== Ordinances ===
In Mormonism, an ordinance is a religious ritual of special significance, often involving the formation of a covenant with God. Ordinances are performed by the authority of the priesthood and in the name of Jesus Christ. The term has a meaning roughly similar to the term sacrament in other Christian denominations.

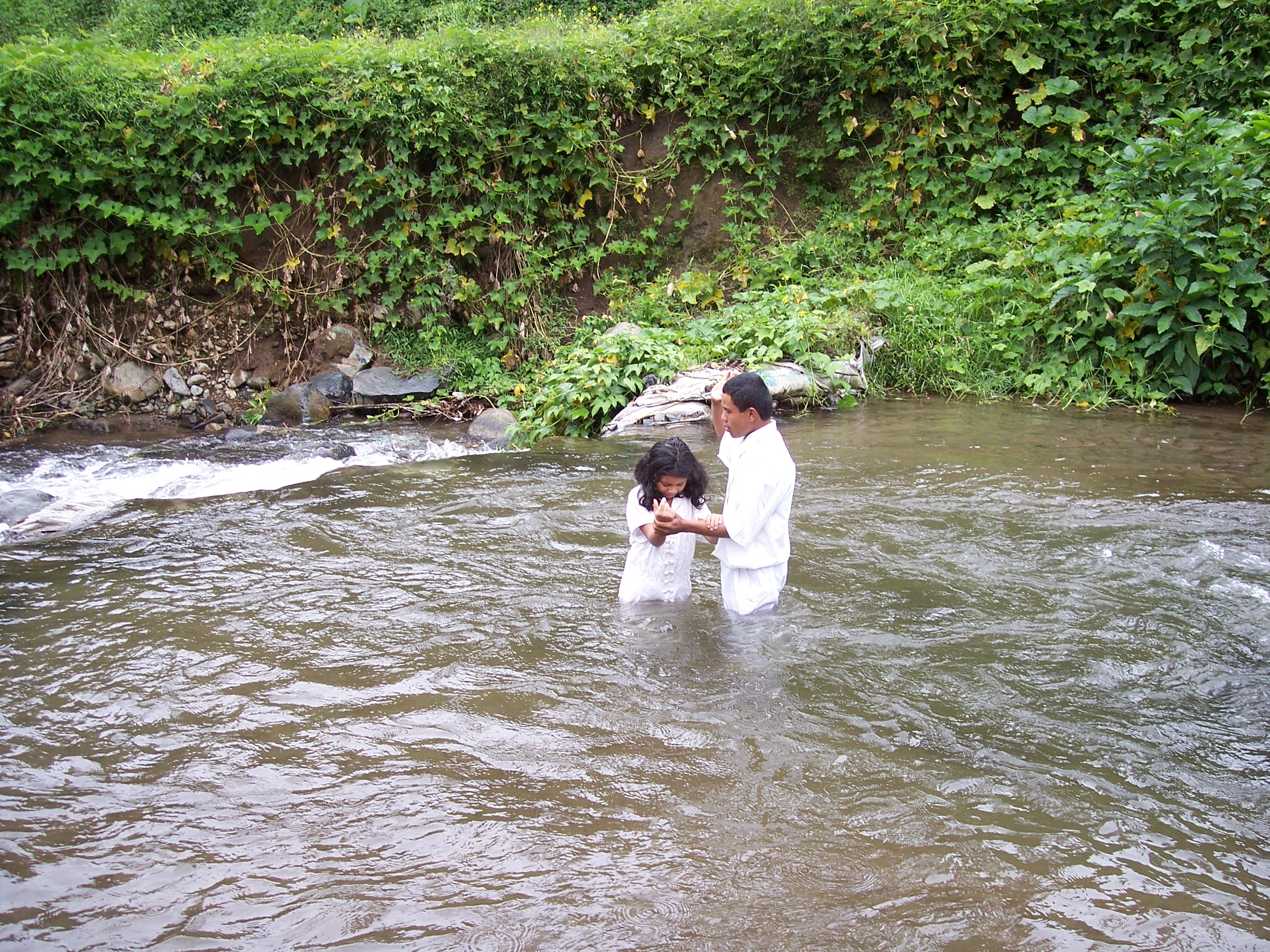
A young man baptizing a child into the LDS Church in Panama

Saving ordinances (or ordinances viewed as necessary for salvation) include: baptism by immersion after the age of accountability (normally age 8); confirmation and reception of the gift of the Holy Ghost, performed by laying hands on the head of a newly baptized member; ordination to the Aaronic and Melchizedek priesthoods for males; an endowment (including washing and anointing) received in temples; and marriage (or sealing) to a spouse.

Mormons also perform other ordinances, which include the Lord's Supper (commonly called the sacrament), naming and blessing children, giving priesthood blessings and patriarchal blessings, anointing and blessing the sick, participating in prayer circles, and setting apart individuals who are called to church positions.

In Mormonism, the saving ordinances are seen as necessary for salvation, but they are insufficient in and of themselves. For example, baptism is required for exaltation, but having been baptized does not guarantee any eternal reward. The baptized person is expected to obey God's commandments, repent of any sinful conduct subsequent to baptism, and receive the other saving ordinances.

Because Mormons believe that everyone must receive specific ordinances to be saved, Mormons perform ordinances on behalf of deceased persons. These ordinances are performed vicariously or by "proxy" on behalf of the dead. In accordance with their belief in each individual's "free agency", living or dead, Mormons believe that the deceased may accept or reject the offered ordinance in the spirit world, just as all spirits decided to accept or reject God's plan originally. In addition, these "conditional" ordinances on behalf of the dead are performed only when a deceased person's genealogical information has been submitted to a temple and correctly processed there before the ordinance ritual is performed. Only ordinances for salvation are performed on behalf of dead people.

=== Scripture ===
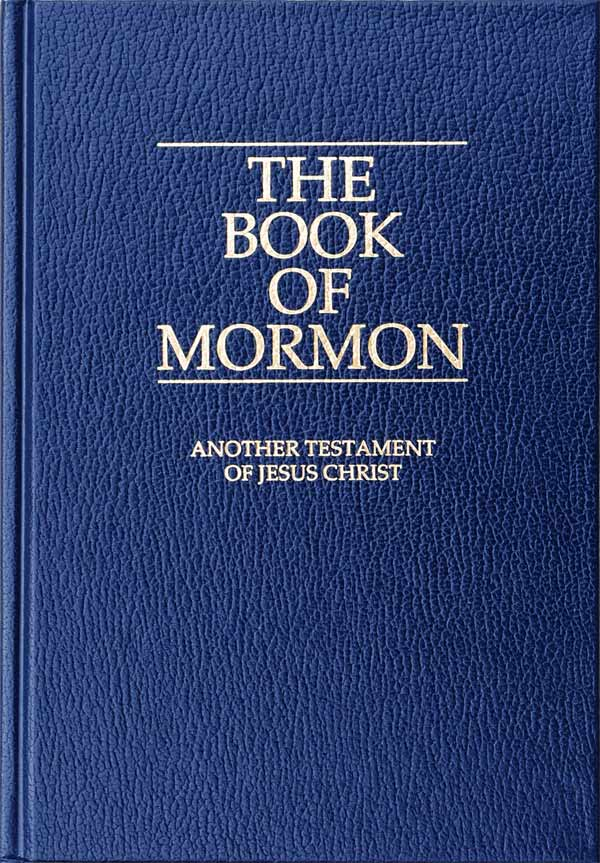
The Book of Mormon: Another Testament of Jesus Christ

Mormons believe in the Old and New Testaments, and the LDS Church uses the Authorized King James Version as its official scriptural text of the Bible. While Mormons believe in the general accuracy of the modern-day text of the Bible, they also believe that it is incomplete and that errors have been introduced. According to Mormon theology, many lost truths are restored in the Book of Mormon, which Mormons hold to be divine scripture and equal in authority to the Bible.

The Mormon scriptural canon also includes a collection of revelations and writings contained in the Doctrine and Covenants, which contains doctrine and prophecy, and the Pearl of Great Price, which addresses briefly Genesis to Exodus. These books, as well as the Joseph Smith Translation of the Bible, have varying degrees of acceptance as divine scripture among different denominations of the Latter Day Saint movement.

=== Revelation ===
In Mormonism, continuous revelation is the principle that God or his divine agents still communicate to humankind. This communication can be manifest in many ways: influences of the Holy Ghost (the principal form in which this principle is manifest), visions, visitations of divine beings, and others. Joseph Smith used the example of the Lord's revelations to Moses in Deuteronomy to explain the importance of continuous revelation:

God said, "Thou shalt not kill"; at another time he said, "Thou shalt utterly destroy." This is the principle on which the government of heaven is conducted, by revelation adapted to the circumstances in which the children of the Kingdom are placed. Whatever God requires is right, no matter what it is, although we may not see the reason thereof till long after the events transpire.

Mormons believe Smith and subsequent church leaders could speak scripture "when moved upon by the Holy Ghost." In addition, many Mormons believe that ancient prophets in other regions of the world received revelations that resulted in additional scriptures that have been lost and may, one day, be forthcoming. In Mormonism, revelation is not limited to church members. For instance, Latter Day Saints believe the United States Constitution is a divinely inspired document.

Mormons are encouraged to develop a personal relationship with the Holy Ghost and receive personal revelation for their own direction and that of their family. The Latter-Day Saint concept of revelation includes the belief that revelation from God is available to all those who earnestly seek it with the intent of doing good. It also teaches that everyone is entitled to personal revelation concerning their stewardship (leadership responsibility). Thus, parents may receive inspiration from God in raising their families; individuals can receive divine inspiration to help them meet personal challenges, and church officers may receive revelation for those they serve.

The important consequence is that each person may receive confirmation that a prophet's doctrines are true and gain divine insight in using those truths for their own benefit and eternal progress. In the church, personal revelation is expected and encouraged, and many converts believe that personal revelation from God was instrumental in their conversion.

== Relationship with other faiths ==
=== Relationship with mainstream Christianity ===
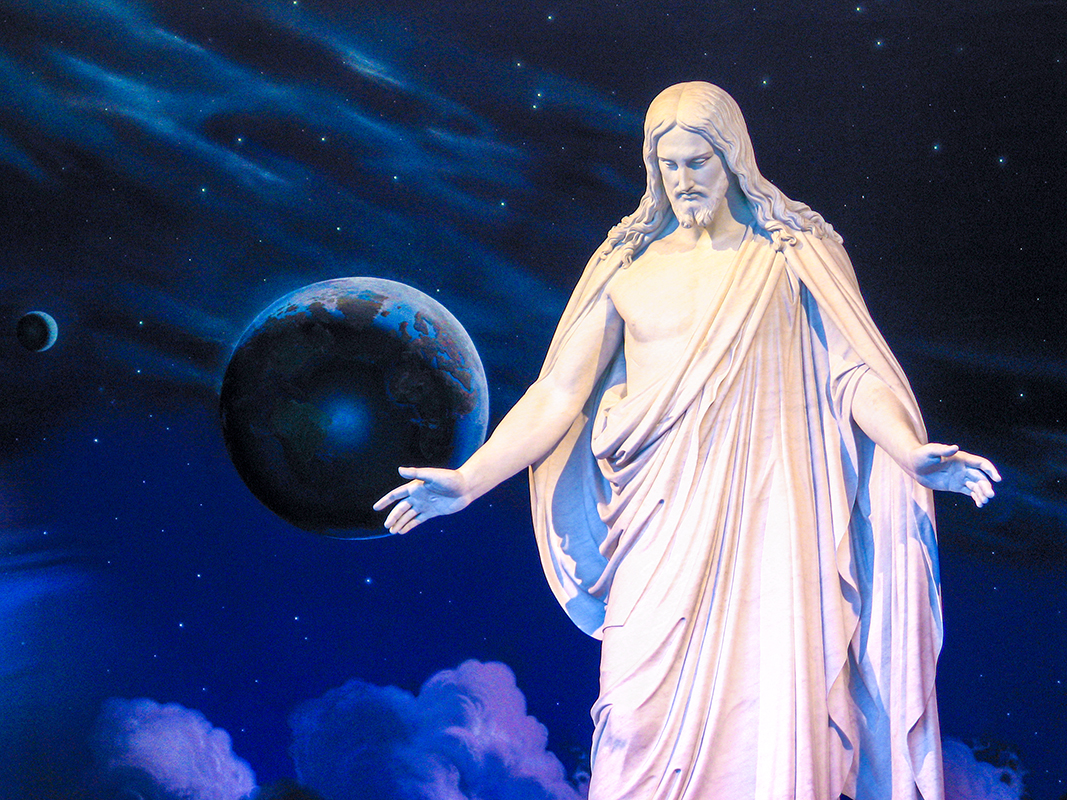
Mormons see Jesus Christ as the premier figure of their religion.

Mormonism categorizes itself within Christianity, and nearly all Mormons self-identify as Christian. For some who define Christianity within the doctrines of Catholicism, Eastern and Oriental Orthodoxy, the Churches of the East, and Protestantism, Mormonism's differences place it outside the umbrella of Christianity.

Since its beginnings, the faith has proclaimed itself to be Christ's Church restored with its original authority, structure and power; maintaining that existing denominations believed in incorrect doctrines and were not acknowledged by God as his church and kingdom. Though the religion quickly gained a large following of Christian seekers, in the 1830s, many American Christians came to view the church's early doctrines and practices as politically and culturally subversive, as well as doctrinally heretical, abominable, and condemnable. This discord led to a series of sometimes-deadly conflicts between Mormons and others who saw themselves as orthodox Christians. Although such violence declined during the twentieth century, the religion's unique doctrinal views and practices still generate criticism, sometimes vehemently so. This gives rise to efforts by Mormons and opposing types of Christians to proselytize each other.

Mormons believe in Jesus Christ as the literal Son of God and Messiah, his crucifixion as a conclusion of a sin offering, and subsequent resurrection. However, Latter-day Saints (LDS) reject the ecumenical creeds and the definition of the Trinity. (In contrast, the second-largest Latter Day Saint denomination, the Community of Christ, is Trinitarian and monotheistic.) Mormons hold the view that the New Testament prophesied both the apostasy from the teachings of Christ and his apostles as well as the restoration of all things prior to the second coming of Christ.

Some notable differences with mainstream Christianity include a belief that Jesus began his atonement in the garden of Gethsemane and continued it to his crucifixion, rather than the orthodox belief that the crucifixion alone was the physical atonement; and an afterlife with three degrees of glory, with hell (often called spirit prison) being a temporary repository for the wicked between death and the resurrection. Additionally, Mormons do not believe in creation ex nihilo, believing that matter is eternal, and creation involved God organizing existing matter.

Much of the Mormon belief system is geographically oriented around the North and South American continents. Mormons believe that the people of the Book of Mormon lived in the Western Hemisphere, that Christ appeared in the western hemisphere after his death and resurrection, that the true faith was restored in Upstate New York by Joseph Smith, that the Garden of Eden was located in North America, and that the New Jerusalem would be built in Missouri. For this and other reasons, including a belief by many Mormons in American exceptionalism, Molly Worthen speculates that this may be why Leo Tolstoy described Mormonism as the "quintessential 'American religion'".

=== Relationship with Judaism ===
Although Mormons do not claim to be part of Judaism, Mormon theology claims to situate Mormonism within the context of Judaism to an extent that goes beyond what most other Christian denominations claim. The faith incorporates many Old Testament ideas into its theology, and the beliefs of Mormons sometimes parallel those of Judaism and certain elements of Jewish culture. In the earliest days of Mormonism, Joseph Smith taught that the Indigenous peoples of the Americas were members of some of the Lost Tribes of Israel. Later, he taught that Mormons were Israelites, and that they may learn of their tribal affiliation within the twelve Israelite tribes. Members of the LDS Church receive Patriarchal blessings which declare the recipient's lineage within one of the tribes of Israel. The lineage is either through true blood-line or adoption. The LDS Church teaches that if one is not a direct descendant of one of the twelve tribes, upon baptism he or she is adopted into one of the tribes. Patriarchal blessings also include personal information which is revealed through a patriarch by the power of the priesthood.

Smith hired Joshua (James) Seixas, son of Gershom Mendes Seixas and Hebrew school teacher at Congregation Shearith Israel, to teach Mormon leaders Hebrew. Smith himself attended some of these classes and went on to use his basic Hebrew in teachings. For example, Smith named the largest Mormon settlement he founded Nauvoo, which means "beautiful" (pl.) in Biblical Hebrew. Brigham Young named a tributary of the Great Salt Lake the Jordan River. The LDS Church has a Jerusalem Center in Israel, where students focus their study on Near Eastern history, culture, language, and the Bible.

There has been some controversy involving Jewish groups who see the actions of some elements of Mormonism as offensive. In the 1990s, Jewish groups vocally opposed the LDS practice of baptism for the dead on behalf of Jewish victims of the Holocaust and Jews in general. According to LDS Church general authority Monte J. Brough, "Mormons who baptized 380,000 Holocaust victims posthumously were motivated by love and compassion and did not understand their gesture might offend Jews ... they did not realize that what they intended as a 'Christian act of service' was 'misguided and insensitive'". Mormons believe that when the dead are baptized through proxy, they have the option of accepting or rejecting the ordinance.

=== Relationship with UFOlogy ===
Many Mormons are believers, experiencers, or promotors of UFOs as an interstellar or non-human phenomenon. Matthew Bowman, scholar of Mormon Studies, writes that while some people use this to try to make Mormonism look silly, "a good number of Latter-day Saints" have welcomed being associated with UFOs. "Latter-day Saints have pointed to the phenomenon as either entirely consistent with their faith or even proof of it. ... These folks are the heirs to a strain of theology going back to Brigham Young that peaked with the early 20th-century writings of church leaders like B.H. Roberts or John Widtsoe."

== Theological divisions ==
Mormon theology includes three main movements. By far the largest of these is "mainstream Mormonism", defined by the leadership of the Church of Jesus Christ of Latter-day Saints (LDS Church). The two broad movements outside mainstream Mormonism are Mormon fundamentalism, and liberal reformist Mormonism.

=== Mainstream Mormon theology ===
Mainstream Mormonism is defined by the leadership of the LDS Church which identifies itself as Christian. Members of the LDS Church consider their top leaders to be prophets and apostles, and are encouraged to accept their positions on matters of theology, while seeking confirmation of them through personal study of the Book of Mormon and the Bible. Personal prayer is encouraged as well. The LDS Church is by far the largest branch of Mormonism. It has continuously existed since the succession crisis of 1844 that split the Latter Day Saint movement after the death of founder Joseph Smith Jr.

The LDS Church seeks to distance itself from other branches of Mormonism, particularly those that practice polygamy. Although, its doctrine on eternal marriages and sealing does still allow a man to be sealed and have eternal marriage with multiple women if he has received a sealing clearance; a woman may only be sealed to one man, and must receive a cancellation of that sealing before being sealed to another man. The church maintains a degree of orthodoxy by excommunicating or disciplining its members who take positions or engage in practices viewed as apostasy. For example, the LDS Church excommunicates members who practice polygamy or who adopt the beliefs and practices of Mormon fundamentalism.

=== Mormon fundamentalism ===
One way Mormon fundamentalism distinguishes itself from mainstream Mormonism is through the practice of plural marriage. Fundamentalists initially broke from the LDS Church after that doctrine was discontinued around the beginning of the 20th century. Mormon fundamentalism teaches that plural marriage is a requirement for exaltation (the highest degree of salvation), which will allow them to live as gods and goddesses in the afterlife. Mainstream Mormons, by contrast, believe that a single Celestial marriage is necessary for exaltation.

In distinction with the LDS Church, Mormon fundamentalists also often believe in a number of other doctrines taught and practiced by Brigham Young in the 19th century, which the LDS Church has either abandoned, repudiated, or put in abeyance. These include:

- the law of consecration also known as the United Order (put in abeyance by the LDS Church in the 19th century);
- the Adam–God teachings taught by Brigham Young and other early leaders of the LDS Church (repudiated by the LDS Church in the mid-20th century);
- the principle of blood atonement (repudiated by the LDS Church in the mid-19th century); and
- the exclusion of black men from the priesthood (abandoned by the LDS Church in 1978).

Mormon fundamentalists believe that these principles were wrongly abandoned or changed by the LDS Church, largely due to the desire of its leadership and members to assimilate into mainstream American society and avoid the persecutions and conflict that had characterized the church throughout its early years.

=== Liberal reformist theology ===
Some LDS Church members have worked towards a more liberal reform of the church. Others have left the LDS Church and still consider themselves to be cultural Mormons. Others have formed new religions (many of them now defunct). For instance the Godbeites broke away from the LDS Church in the late 19th century, on the basis of both political and religious liberalism, and in 1985 the Restoration Church of Jesus Christ broke away from the LDS Church as an LGBT-friendly denomination, which was formally dissolved in 2010.

== Criticism ==
As the largest denomination within Mormonism, the LDS Church has been the subject of criticism since it was founded by Joseph Smith in 1830.

Perhaps the most controversial, and a key contributing factor for Smith's murder, is the claim that plural marriage (as defenders call it) or polygamy (as critics call it) is biblically authorized. Under heavy pressure—Utah would not be accepted as a state if polygamy was practiced—the church formally and publicly renounced the practice in 1890. Utah's statehood soon followed. However, plural marriage remains a controversial and divisive issue, as despite the official renunciation of 1890, it still has sympathizers, defenders, and semi-secret practitioners within Mormonism, though not within the LDS Church.

More recent criticism has concerned questions of historical revisionism, homophobia, racism, sexist policies, inadequate financial disclosure, and the historical authenticity of the Book of Mormon.

== See also ==
- Anti-Mormonism
- Black people and Mormonism
- Black people and early Mormonism
- Black people and Mormon priesthood
- Encyclopedia of Mormonism
- List of articles about Mormonism
- List of denominations in the Latter Day Saint movement
- Mormonism and Pacific Islanders
- Native American people and Mormonism
- Outline of Joseph Smith
- Outline of the Book of Mormon
- New religious movement
- The Joseph Smith Papers
