= Gift of the Holy Ghost =

The Gift of the Holy Ghost may refer to:

- Baptism with the Holy Spirit, the bestowing of the Holy Spirit (or Holy Ghost)
- Seven gifts of the Holy Spirit
- Other spiritual gifts given by the Holy Spirit
- Confirmation (Latter Day Saints) in the Church of Jesus Christ of Latter-day Saints
