= Light of Christ (Latter Day Saints) =

The Light of Christ is a doctrine of the Latter Day Saint movement, including the Church of Jesus Christ of Latter-day Saints (LDS Church), that is defined as "the divine energy, power, or influence that proceeds from God through Christ and gives life and light to all things." The Light of Christ is "the law by which all things are governed in heaven and on earth" and is often said to bestow conscience upon people. The doctrine teaches that the light of Christ is given to every person.

Care is often taken to distinguish the light of Christ from the Holy Ghost. The Holy Ghost is believed to be a divine spirit personage and a member of the Godhead who can exert spiritual influence on mortals. The light of Christ is not a personage and is more ubiquitous and universal: "Wherever there is human life, there is the Spirit of Christ." Any person can feel the Holy Ghost from time to time, but only people who have been baptized and confirmed by the appropriate priesthood authority can have the Holy Ghost with them always. The light of Christ guides people to the gospel of Jesus Christ and prepares them for the time that they will receive the Holy Ghost through confirmation.

A writer in an LDS Church magazine acknowledged that "There is still much that we do not know about the nature and power of the Holy Ghost and the Light of Christ."

== See also ==
- Divine light
