= Ordinance (Latter Day Saints) =

Sacred rites and ceremonies within the Latter Day Saint movement

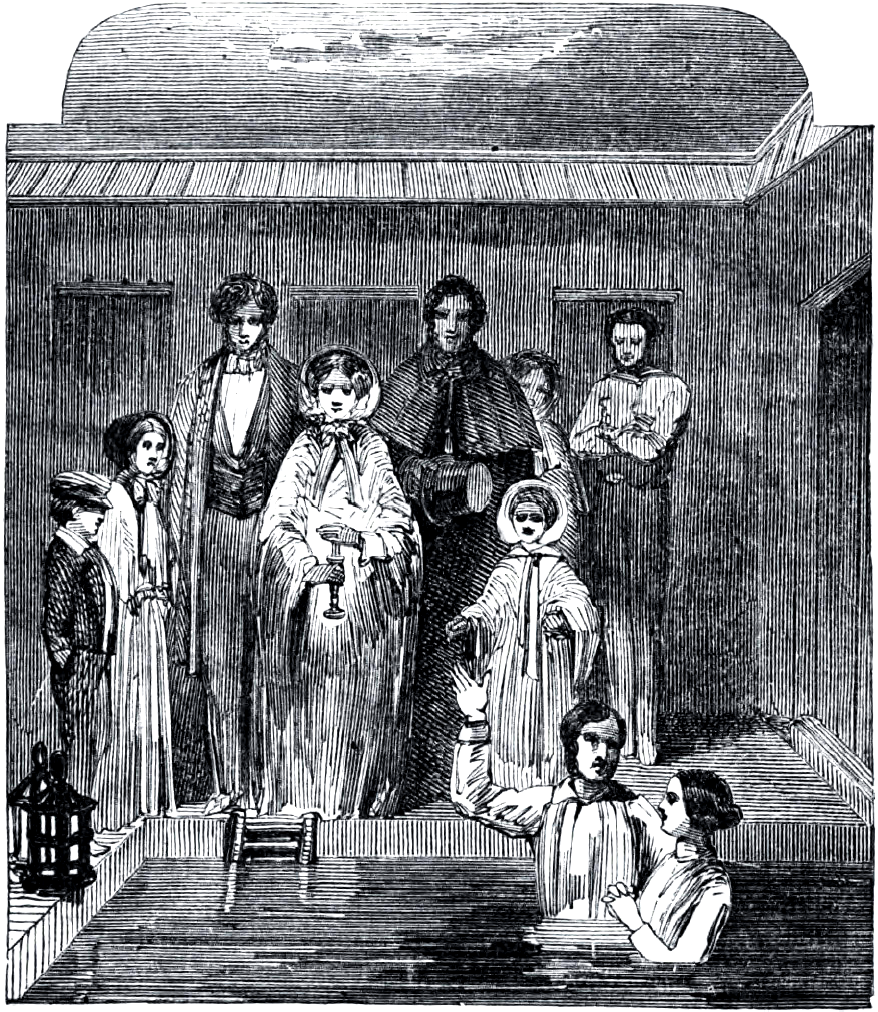
Artist's depiction of a Latter Day Saint baptism including the all-white clothing, c. 1850.

In the Latter Day Saint movement, an ordinance is a sacred rite or ceremony that has spiritual and symbolic meanings and act as a means of conveying divine grace. Ordinances are physical acts which signify or symbolize an underlying spiritual act; for some ordinances, the spiritual act is the finalization of a covenant between the ordinance recipient and God.

Ordinances are usually performed by the authority of the priesthood and in the name of Jesus Christ. The use of the term "ordinance" by adherents is distinct from the use of the term in other branches of Christian tradition, where "ordinance" is often used to imply that the act is merely symbolic and does not convey grace. Latter Day Saint use of the term "ordinance" carries the same meaning as the term "sacrament" as used by other Christian denominations. Community of Christ-derived denominations of the Latter Day Saint movement also tend to refer to "sacraments" rather than "ordinances".

Some ordinances—such as baptism, confirmation and the sacrament of the Lord's Supper—are akin to similarly named sacraments of other Christian denominations. Other Latter Day Saint ordinances—including the endowment and sealings—are unique and usually performed within a Latter Day Saint temple.

== Saving ordinances ==
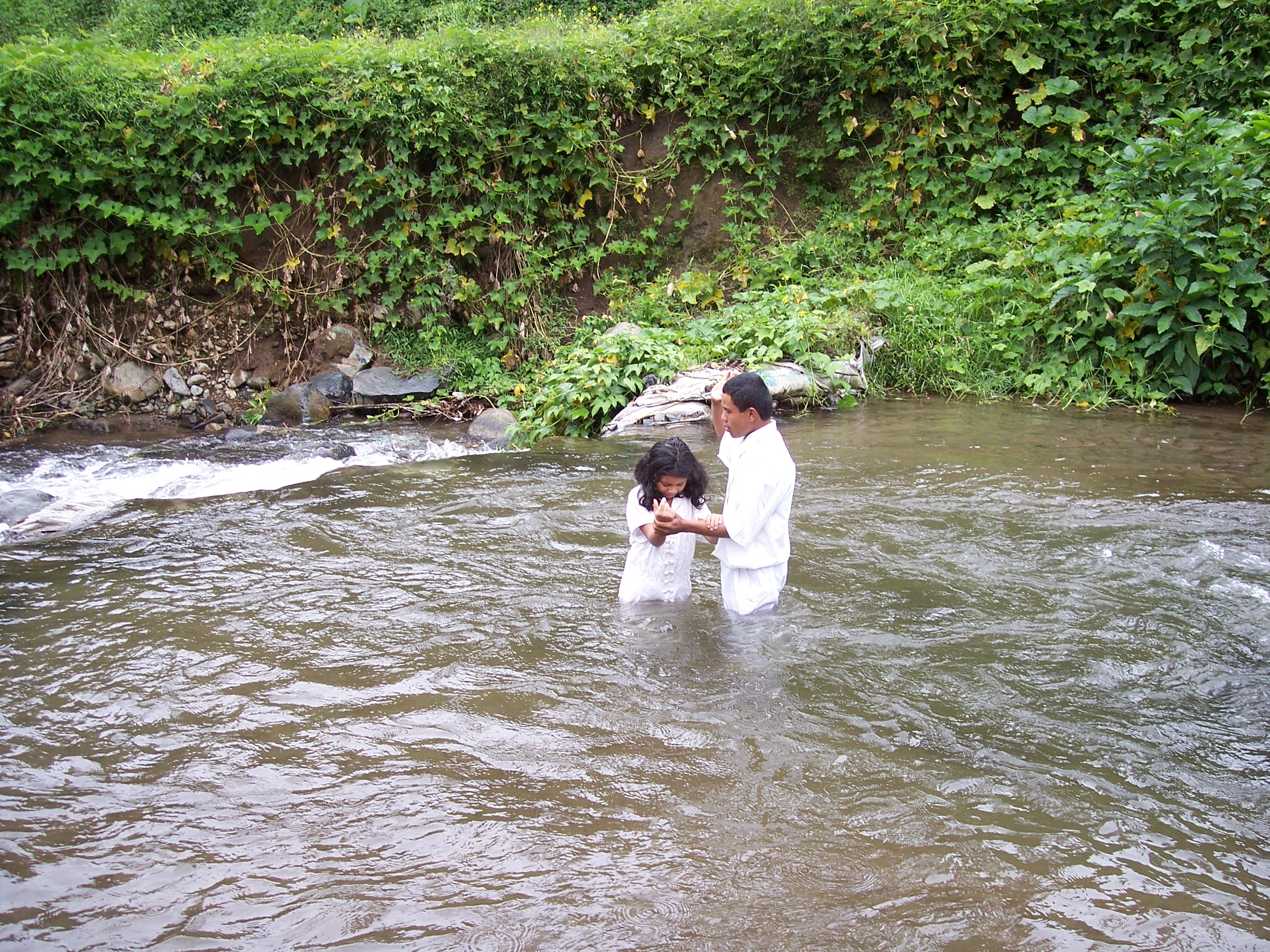
A young man baptizing a child into the Church of Jesus Christ of Latter-day Saints in Panama

Saving ordinances are those ordinances that are a requirement for exaltation. Most Latter Day Saints denominations see saving ordinances as necessary, but not sufficient, requirements for exaltation.

The following are examples of saving ordinances in most sects of the Latter Day Saint movement:

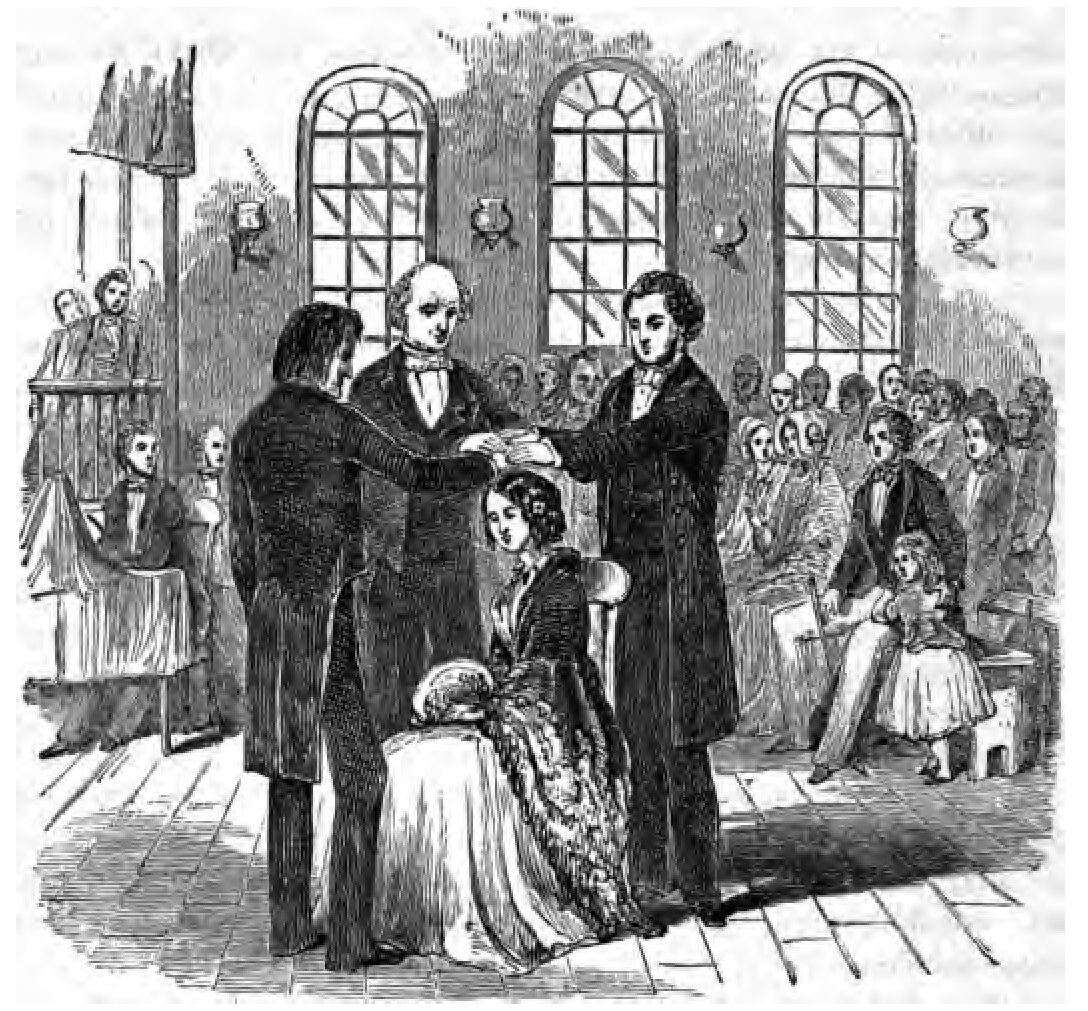
A Latter Day Saint confirmation c. 1852.

1. Baptism: Performed by immersion at age eight or older. Baptism is seen as symbolic both of Jesus' death, burial and resurrection and is also symbolic of the baptized individual putting off of the natural or sinful man and becoming spiritually reborn as a disciple of Jesus.
2. Confirmation and reception of the Gift of the Holy Ghost: Performed by laying hands on the head of a newly baptized member. Through confirmation, the initiate becomes an official member of the church and receives the "gift of the Holy Ghost".
3. Ordination to the Priesthood: In the Latter Day Saint movement, the priesthood is the power and authority of God given to man, including the authority to perform ordinances and to act as a leader in the church. Latter Day Saint theology has recognized at least three orders of priesthood: (1) the Aaronic priesthood, (2) the Melchizedek priesthood; and (3) the Patriarchal priesthood. Although these are different orders, they are all subsumed under the priesthood held by Jesus Christ, or the Melchizedek priesthood. For most of the history of the Latter Day Saint movement, only men have been ordained to specific offices in the priesthood, and most Latter Day Saint denominations still restrict their priesthood to men. However, some exceptions to this policy do exist, such as within the Church of Jesus Christ of Latter Day Saints (Strangite), a church founded by James J. Strang, and the Community of Christ, which began ordaining women to all of its priesthood offices in 1984.

== Saving temple ordinances ==
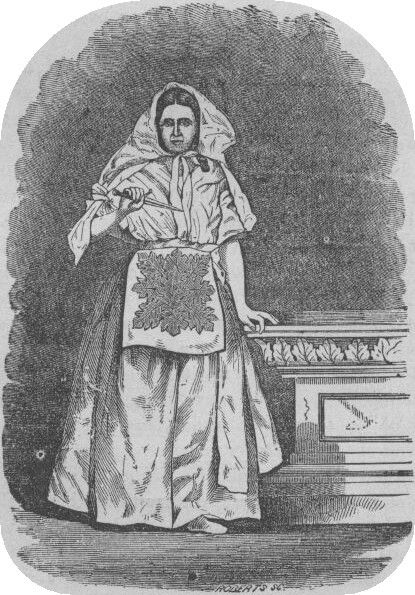
Robes of the Nauvoo endowment, c. 1870s

In some Latter Day Saint churches, additional saving ordinances are performed in temples. These include the endowment, the washing and anointing, and sealings. Currently, only the Church of Jesus Christ of Latter-day Saints (LDS Church)-derived and Cutlerite-derived denominations within the Latter Day Saints movement practice all three. Other Latter Day Saint denominations, such as Community of Christ-derived and Hedrickite-derived denominations do not perform any of them. Still other denominations, such Strangite-derived denominations, practice sealings but reject the washing and anointing and the endowment.

1. Endowment: Referred to as a gift of "power from on high" by Joseph Smith, founder of the Latter Day Saint movement, although the purpose and meaning of the endowment varied during his lifetime. After 1842, the endowment usually consists of two phases: (1) an initiation, and (2) an instructional and testing phase. The initiation consisted of the washing and anointing, culminating in the clothing of the patron in a "Garment of the Holy Priesthood". The instructional and testing phase of the endowment consisted of a scripted reenactment of Adam and Eve's experience in the Garden of Eden. The instruction is punctuated with personal covenants, gestures, and a prayer circle around an altar. At the end of instruction, the initiate's knowledge of symbolic gestures and keywords is tested at a "veil", a symbolic final frontier for the initiate to face the judgment of Jesus, before entering the presence of God in the Celestial Kingdom.
2. Marriage and sealing: An ordinance where individuals are married and sealed as husband and wife as an eternal family. Any children the couple may already have are sealed to the family and any children born into this marriage after sealing are also sealed into that family which will live together forever, if obedient to God's commandments. Children that are brought into the family later, though not born into the family such as via adoption, can be sealed to the family later in a sealing ceremony without the need for the marriage portion. This ordinance is particularly performed by the LDS Church and branches of Mormon fundamentalism.
3. Sealing to parents: For children born before a marriage and sealing is performed or who have been adopted into a family, this ordinance seals them into that family as if they had been born into a sealed family.

== Saving ordinances on behalf of the dead ==
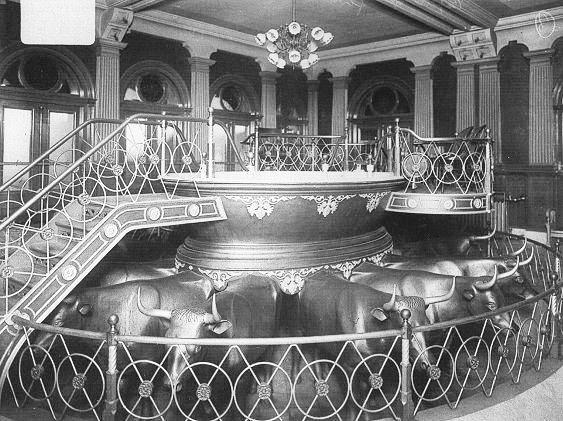
Baptismal font in the Salt Lake Temple, c. 1912, where baptisms for the dead are performed by the LDS Church

According to Latter Day Saint theology, ordinances can be performed vicariously (i.e., post-mortem) on behalf of any person who would desire to accept the ordinance but did not receive it. While some sects, such as the Hedrickite denominations, have rejected some or all vicariously performed ordinances, other denominations, such as the LDS Church, still perform the saving ordinances on behalf of their deceased ancestors. These are performed vicariously or by "proxy" on behalf of the dead, and church members believe that it is up to the deceased to accept or reject the offered ordinance in the spirit world. Since deceased persons no longer have an earthly existence, they are unable to directly participate in these "saving" ordinances themselves. The physical performance of these ordinances by proxy is seen as fulfillment of the requirement. As with living ordinances, ordinances for the dead are considered necessary but insufficient. It is believed that the spirits in the spirit world are offered the teachings of the full gospel of Jesus Christ and have the opportunity to accept or decline vicarious ordinances done on their behalf. Some LDS Church members refer to Paul in 1 Corinthians 15:29 regarding baptism for the dead as evidence that this was a religious practice of ancient tradition that has now been restored by the LDS Church.

== Non-saving ordinances ==
Ordinances which are not a requirement for exaltation are referred to as non-saving ordinances. A non-saving ordinance may be performed on behalf of an individual many times; in practice, however, some non-saving ordinances are only performed once per individual. While not every denomination performs each of these ordinances, they can be found throughout Latter Day Saint theology.

1. Animal sacrifice: The ordinance of animal sacrifice was instituted in the Strangite denominations, primarily as a part of Strangite celebration rituals. Although the chapter on "Sacrifices" in Strang's Book of the Law of the Lord speaks of them as being offered for sins, the prohibition on such sacrifices contained in 3 Nephi 9:19–20, meant that Strang focused instead on sacrifice as an element of religious festivities, especially the commemoration of the coronation a king. The head of every house, from the king to his lowest subject, was to offer "a heifer, or a lamb, or a dove. Every man a clean beast, or a clean fowl, according to his household."
2. Anointing of the Sick/Administration to the Sick and Consecrating oil: A person who is physically ill, emotionally strained, or sick in any other way may request administration of this blessing or ordinance. The purposes to provide assurance of God's care and concern and also of the church's interest in that person. Often this included the anointing of the head of the person with consecrated oil, necessitating the ordinance of "Consecrating oil".
3. Calling: This ordinance requires that a person having responsibility over a unit or an auxiliary of the church prayerfully seek revelation to determine which individual is to fill particular responsibilities within that organization. If the individual agrees—and many persons wait to receive spiritual confirmation before agreeing—then the individual is "called" to the position.
4. Dedication of a church building or a temple: This ordinance is performed after the building is completed or purchased; if a building undergoes extensive remodeling, this ordinance may be performed again.
5. Dedication of a grave: This ordinance is performed immediately before the body is placed in the grave; it is usually performed only once.
6. Dedication of a land or country for the preaching of the gospel: This ordinance is usually performed before or soon after missionaries begin to preach in a particular country; it is usually performed only once (but may be performed again if missionaries have not been in a particular country for an extended period of time); it is typically performed by an apostle.
  Rigdonite/Bickertonite Foot washing in the Philippines
7. Foot washing: The ordinance of foot washing was instituted in the Rigdonite/Bickertonite denominations as a demonstration of personal humility. Members follow the ordinance of as described in John 13:5 four times a year, when members greet each other with a "holy kiss", preferably on the cheek, to signify that they are greeting each other in the love of God, in accordance with the description given in the King James Version of the New Testament. The Rigdonite/Bickertonite denominations believes that this is a very important ordinance, citing Jesus' statement to Peter: "If I wash thee not, thou hast no part with me."
8. Hosanna Shout: An organized ritual of a congregation of shouting hosanna, as a recitation of praise to God, while waving a white handkerchief, and is usually performed as a ritual in the dedication of a Temple. It was first used as part in the dedication the Kirtland temple and was part of the Kirtland endowment ceremony.
9. Naming and blessing a child: Typically this ordinance is performed shortly only once after a child's birth in fulfillment of the commandment in the Doctrine and Covenants: "Every member of the church of Christ having children is to bring them unto the elders before the church, who are to lay their hands upon them in the name of Jesus Christ, and bless them in his name." The purpose of the practice is twofold: to give a baby an official name and to provide an opportunity to give a blessing for the child's spiritual and physical welfare.
10. Patriarchal blessing/Evangelist's blessing: A blessing or ordinance given normally once by a patriarch to a church member. Patriarchal blessings are modeled after the blessing given by Jacob to each of his sons prior to his death and are considered a gift of knowledge and strength of one's coming challenges and blessings.
11. Prayer circle: An antiphonic prayer around an altar, performed as part of the endowment and on other occasions, such among the Apostolic United Brethren and the True and Living Church of Jesus Christ of Saints of the Last Days, where prayer circles within temples, endowment houses, and homes are still common.
12. Priesthood blessing (including father's blessings): A prayer for healing, comfort or counsel given by a Melchizedek Priesthood holder, who lays his hands on the head of the person receiving the blessing.
13. Rebaptism of faithful members: In late 1839, many who were already baptized members of the church, were rebaptised either to show a renewal of their commitment to the movement or as part of a healing ordinance. Some denominations, such as the Community of Christ, never performed this ordinance. While others, like the LDS church historically performed this ordinance, such as during the Mormon Reformation, but no longer do.
14. Sacrament/Lord's Supper: An ordinance in which participants eat bread and drink wine, water, or unfermented grape juice in remembrance of the body and blood of Jesus Christ. It is similar to the Eucharist in the Catholic Church, or communion in Protestant denominations. Normally, the sacrament is provided either every Sunday, on the first Sunday of each month, as part of the regular meeting, or other additional special occasions. Strictly speaking, this is a non-saving ordinance because a person could be exalted without ever having participated in the sacrament. However, individuals who have been baptized are expected to regularly participate in the sacrament.
15. Setting apart: An ordinance where a person is formally chosen and blessed to carry out a specific calling or responsibility in the church. Once a person has accepted the responsibility of holding a calling and has been "Sustained" by the members of the church for that position, one or more priesthood holders "set apart" the person to serve in that calling, usually accomplish by giving the person a priesthood blessing by the laying on of hands.
16. Shaking the dust from the feet: A cursing ordinance in which a priesthood holder leaves a curse instead of a blessing, by casting off the dust of their feet "against them as a testimony, and cleansing your feet by the wayside." It was most often used against those who rejected the teachings of the church, or who failed to provide missionaries, with food, money, or shelter. Since the early-20th century, the practice has been rare.
17. Ritual of the law of adoption: An ordinance practiced mainly between 1846 and 1894 in which priesthood men were sealed in a father–son relationship to other men who were not part of nor even distantly related to their immediate nuclear family. There is no surviving evidence that the "law of adoption" sealing practice was taught by Joseph Smith or his contemporaries prior to Smith's death in 1844. However, adoptions appeared on the records of the Nauvoo Temple in 1846, and scholars generally assume that the practice was instituted by Brigham Young. Following an address on 8 April 1894 by Wilford Woodruff, the practice of the law of adoption ceased in the LDS Church. However, some denominations, such as the Restoration Church of Jesus Christ. (commonly referred to as the "Gay Mormon Church"), continue to perform the ritual of the law of adoption.
18. Second anointing: An ordinance performed for a sealed couple, sealing them up to eternal life, and anointing them as kings and queens, priests, and priestesses. In the LDS Church it is also called the fulness of the priesthood, and is a rare, but currently practiced ordinance for live participants, and (less commonly) vicariously for deceased individuals, though, it is usually only given in absolute secrecy to a small number of members after a lifetime of service. The ordinance is also still performed by many Mormon fundamentalist groups.

== See also ==
- The Church of Jesus Christ (Bickertonite)#Ordinances
- Ordinance room
- Reverence (emotion)
