= Anointing of the sick =

Religious anointing/sacrament

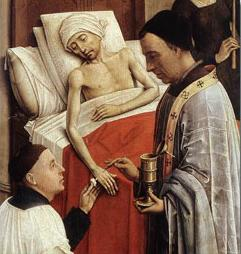
Detail of The Seven Sacraments (1445) by Rogier van der Weyden showing the sacrament of Extreme Unction or Anointing of the Sick

Anointing of the sick, known also as unction, is a form of religious anointing, i.e. the pouring of oil on a sick person with the purpose of benefiting them. It is practiced by many Christian churches and denominations.

Anointing of the sick was a customary practice in many civilizations, including among the ancient Greeks and early Jewish communities. The use of oil for healing purposes is referred to in the writings of Hippocrates.

Anointing of the sick should be distinguished from other religious anointings that occur in relation to other sacraments, in particular baptism, confirmation and ordination, and also in the coronation of a monarch.

== Names ==
Since 1972, the Roman Catholic Church has used the name "Anointing of the Sick" both in the English translations issued by the Holy See of its official documents in Latin and in the English official documents of Episcopal conferences. It did not forbid the use of other names, such as the more archaic term "Unction of the Sick" or the term "Extreme Unction": Cardinal Walter Kasper used the latter term in his intervention at the 2005 Assembly of the Synod of Bishops. However, the Church declared that "'Extreme unction' ... may also and more fittingly be called 'anointing of the sick'", and has itself adopted the latter term, while not outlawing the former. This is to emphasize that the sacrament is available, and recommended, to all those suffering from any serious illness, and to dispel the common misconception that it is exclusively for those at or very near the point of death.

Extreme Unction was the usual name for the sacrament in the West from the late twelfth century until 1972, and was thus used at the Council of Trent and in the 1913 Catholic Encyclopedia. Peter Lombard (died 1160) is the first writer known to have used the term, which did not become the usual name in the West till towards the end of the twelfth century, and never became current in the East. The word "extreme" (final) indicated either that it was the last of the sacramental unctions (after the anointings at Baptism, Confirmation and, if received, Holy Orders) or because at that time it was normally administered only when a patient was in extremis.

Other names used in the West include the unction or blessing of consecrated oil, the unction of God, and the office of the unction. Among some Protestant bodies, who do not consider it a sacrament, but instead as a practice suggested rather than commanded by Scripture, it is called anointing with oil.

In the Greek Church, the sacrament is called Euchelaion (Greek Εὐχέλαιον, from εὐχή, "prayer", and ἔλαιον, "oil"). Other names are also used, such as ἅγιον ἔλαιον (holy oil), ἡγιασμένον ἔλαιον (consecrated oil), and χρῖσις or χρῖσμα (anointing).

The Community of Christ uses the term administration to the sick.

The term "last rites" refers to administration to a dying person not only of this sacrament but also of Penance and Holy Communion, the last of which, when administered in such circumstances, is known as "Viaticum", a word whose original meaning in Latin was "provision for the journey". The normal order of administration is: first Penance (if the dying person is physically unable to confess, absolution, conditional on the existence of contrition, is given); next, Anointing; finally, Viaticum (if the person can receive it).

== Biblical texts ==
The chief biblical text concerning the rite is the Epistle of James (James 5:14–15): "Is any among you sick? Let him call for the elders of the church, and let them pray over him, anointing him with oil in the name of the Lord; and the prayer of faith will save the sick man, and the Lord will raise him up; and if he has committed sins, he will be forgiven" (RSV).

Matthew 10:8, Luke 10:8–9 and Mark 6:13 are also quoted in this context.

== Sacramental beliefs ==
The Catholic, Eastern Orthodox and Oriental Orthodox Churches and Old Catholic Churches consider this anointing to be a sacrament. Other Christians too, in particular, Lutherans, Anglicans and some Protestant and other Christian communities use a rite of anointing the sick, without necessarily classifying it as a sacrament.

In the Churches mentioned here by name, the oil used (called "oil of the sick" in both West and East) is blessed specifically for this purpose.

=== Roman Catholic Church ===
An extensive account of the teaching of the Catholic Church on Anointing of the Sick is given in Catechism of the Catholic Church.

Anointing of the Sick is one of the seven Sacraments recognized by the Catholic Church, and is associated with bodily healing and also forgiveness of sins. Only ordained priests can administer it, and "any priest may carry the holy oil with him, so that in a case of necessity he can administer the sacrament of anointing of the sick."

==== Sacramental graces ====
The Catholic Church sees the effects of the sacrament as follows. As the sacrament of Marriage gives grace for the married state, the sacrament of Anointing of the Sick gives grace for the state into which people enter through sickness. Through the sacrament a gift of the Holy Spirit is given, that renews confidence and faith in God and strengthens against temptations to discouragement, despair and anguish at the thought of death and the struggle of death; it prevents from losing Christian hope in God's justice, truth and salvation.

The special grace of the sacrament of the Anointing of the Sick has as its effects:

- the uniting of the sick person to the passion of Christ, for his own good and that of the whole Church;
- the strengthening, peace, and courage to endure, in a Christian manner, the sufferings of illness or old age;
- the forgiveness of sins, if the sick person was not able to obtain it through the sacrament of penance;
- the restoration of health, if it is conducive to the salvation of his soul;
- the preparation for passing over to eternal life."

==== Sacramental oil ====
The duly blessed oil used in the sacrament is, as laid down in the Apostolic Constitution, sacram unctionem infirmorum, pressed from olives or from other plants. It is blessed by the bishop of the diocese at the Chrism Mass he celebrates on Holy Thursday or on a day close to it. If oil blessed by the bishop is not available, the priest administering the sacrament may bless the oil, but only within the framework of the celebration.

==== Ordinary Form of the Roman Rite (1972) ====
The Roman Rite Anointing of the Sick, as revised in 1972, puts greater stress than in the immediately preceding centuries on the sacrament's aspect of healing, primarily spiritual but also physical, and points to the place sickness holds in the normal life of Christians and its part in the redemptive work of the Church. Canon law permits its administration to a Catholic who has reached the age of reason and is beginning to be put in danger by illness or old age, unless the person in question obstinately persists in a manifestly grave sin. "If there is any doubt as to whether the sick person has reached the use of reason, or is dangerously ill, or is dead, this sacrament is to be administered". There is an obligation to administer it to the sick who, when they were in possession of their faculties, at least implicitly asked for it. A new illness or a renewal or worsening of the first illness enables a person to receive the sacrament a further time.

The ritual book on pastoral care of the sick provides three rites: anointing outside Mass, anointing within Mass, and anointing in a hospital or institution. The rite of anointing outside Mass begins with a greeting by the priest, followed by sprinkling of all present with holy water, if deemed desirable, and a short instruction. There follows a penitential act, as at the beginning of Mass. If the sick person wishes to receive the sacrament of penance, it is preferable that the priest make himself available for this during a previous visit; but if the sick person must confess during the celebration of the sacrament of anointing, this confession replaces the penitential rite A passage of Scripture is read, and the priest may give a brief explanation of the reading, a short litany is said, and the priest lays his hands on the head of the sick person and then says a prayer of thanksgiving over the already blessed oil or, if necessary, blesses the oil himself.

The Dicastery for the Doctrine of the Faith has provided a Divine Worship edition of the ritual book on pastoral care for use in the Personal Ordinariates which contains the following prayer for optional use between the litany and the sacramental form of the anointing: "In the Name of the Father, ✠ and of the Son, ✠ and of the Holy ✠ Spirit, may there be extinguished in thee all power of the devil, through the imposition of our hands, and through the invocation of the glorious and holy Virgin Mary Mother of God, and of her illustrious Spouse Joseph, and of all holy Angels, Archangels, Patriarchs, Prophets, Apostles, Martyrs, Confessors and Virgins, and of all the Saints. Amen."

The actual anointing of the sick person is done on the forehead, with the prayer: "Through this holy anointing may the Lord in his love and mercy help you with the grace of the Holy Spirit", and on the hands, with the prayer "May the Lord who frees you from sin save you and raise you up". To each prayer the sick person, if able, responds: "Amen."

It is permitted, in accordance with local culture and traditions and the condition of the sick person, to anoint other parts of the body in addition, such as the area of pain or injury, but without repeating the sacramental form. In case of emergency, a single anointing, if possible but not absolutely necessary if not possible on the forehead, is sufficient.

==== Extraordinary Form of the Roman Rite ====
From the early Middle Ages until after the Second Vatican Council the sacrament was administered, within the Latin Church, only when death was approaching and, in practice, bodily recovery was not ordinarily looked for, giving rise, as mentioned above to the name "Extreme Unction" (i.e. final anointing). The extraordinary form of the Roman Rite includes anointing of seven parts of the body while saying in Latin:

Per istam sanctam Unctiónem et suam piisimam misericórdiam, indúlgeat tibi Dóminus quidquid per (visum, auditorum, odorátum, gustum et locutiónem, tactum, gressum, lumborum delectationem) deliquisti.

Translation:

Through this holy unction and His own most tender mercy may the Lord pardon thee whatever sins thou hast committed by (sight, hearing, smell, taste and speech, touch, walking, carnal pleasure).

The last phrase was chosen to correspond to the part of the body that was touched. The 1913 Catholic Encyclopedia explains that "the unction of the loins is generally, if not universally, omitted in English-speaking countries, and it is of course everywhere forbidden in case of women".

Anointing in the extraordinary form is still permitted under the conditions mentioned in article 9 of the 2007 motu proprio Summorum Pontificum. In the case of necessity when only a single anointing on the forehead is possible, it suffices for valid administration of the sacrament to use the shortened form:

Per istam sanctam unctionem indulgeat tibi Dominus, quidquid deliquisti. Amen.

Translation:

Through this holy anointing, may the Lord pardon thee whatever sins thou hast committed. Amen.

When it becomes opportune, all the anointings are to be supplied together with their respective forms for the integrity of the sacrament. If the sacrament is conferred conditionally, for example, if a person is unconscious, Si es capax ("if you are capable") is added to the beginning of the form, not Si dispositus es ("if you are disposed"). In doubt if the soul has left the body through death, the priest adds, Si vivis ("if you are alive").

==== Other Western historical forms ====
Liturgical rites of the Catholic Church, both Western and Eastern, other than the Roman, have a variety of other forms for celebrating the sacrament. For example, according to Giovanni Diclich who cites De Rubeis, De Ritibus vestutis &c. cap. 28 p. 381, the Aquileian Rite, also called Rito Patriarchino, had twelve anointings, namely, of the head, forehead, eyes, ears, nose, lips, throat, chest, heart, shoulders, hands, and feet. The form used to anoint is the first person plural indicative, except for the anointing on the head which could be either in the first person singular or plural. For example, the form is given as:

Ungo caput tuum Oleo benedicto + in nomine Patris, et Filii, et Spiritus Sancti. Vel Ungimus caput tuum Oleo divinitus sanctificato + in nomine Sanctae et Individuae Trinitatis ut more militis praeparatus ad luctamen, possis aereas superare catervas: per Christum Dominum nostrum. Amen.

Translation:

I anoint your head with blessed Oil + in the name of the Father, and of the Son, and of the Holy Spirit. Or We anoint your head with divinely sanctified Oil + in the name of the Holy and Undivided Trinity so that prepared for the conflict in the way of a soldier, you might be able to overcome the aereal throng: through Christ our Lord. Amen.

The other anointings all mention an anointing with oil and are all made "through Christ our Lord", and "in the name of the Father, and of the Son, and of the Holy Spirit", except the anointing of the heart which, as in the second option for anointing of the head, is "in the name of the Holy and Undivided Trinity". The Latin forms are as follows:

(Ad frontem) Ungimus frontem tuam Oleo sancto in nomine Patris, et Filii, et Spiritus Sancti, in remissionem omnium peccatorum; ut sit tibi haec unction sanctificationis ad purificationem mentis et corporis; ut non lateat in te spiritus immundus neque in membris, neque in medullis, neque in ulla compagine membrorum: sed habitet in te virtus Christi Altissimi et Spiritus Sancti: per Christum Dominum nostrum. Amen.

(Ad oculos) Ungimus oculos tuos Oleo sanctificato, in nomine Patris, et Filii, et Spiritus Sancti: ut quidquid illicito visu deliquisti, hac unctione expietur per Christum Dominum nostrum. Amen.

(Ad aures) Ungimus has aures sacri Olei liquore in nomine Patris, et Filii, et Spiritus Sancti: ut quidquid peccati delectatione nocivi auditus admissum est, medicina hac spirituali evacuetur: per Christum Dominum nostrum. Amen.

(Ad nares) Ungimus has nares Olei hujus liquore in nomine Patris, et Filii, et Spiritus Sancti: ut quidquid noxio vapore contractum est, vel odore superfluo, ista evacuet unctio vel medicatio: per Christum Dominum nostrum. Amen.

(Ad labia) Ungimus labia ista consecrati Olei medicamento, in nomine Patris, et Filii, et Spiritus Sancti: ut quidquid otiose, vel etiam crimnosa peccasti locutione, divina clementia miserante expurgetur: per Christum Dominum nostrum. Amen.

(Ad guttur) Ungimus te in gutture Oleo sancto in nomine Patris, et Filii, et Spiritus Sancti, ut non lateat in te spiritus immundus, neque in membris, neque in medullis, neque in ulla compagine membrorum: sed habitet in te virtus Christi Altissimi et Spiritus Sancti:quatenus per hujus operationem mysterii, et per hanc sacrati Olei unctionem, atque nostrum deprecationem virtute Sanctae Trinitatis medicates, sive fotus; pristinam, et meliorem percipere merearis sanitatem: per Christum Dominum nostrum. Amen.

(Ad pectus) Ungimus pectus tuum Oleo divinitus sanctificato in nomine Patris, et Filii, et Spiritus Sancti, ut hac unctione pectoris fortiter certare valeas adversus aereas potestates: per Christum Dominum nostrum. Amen.

(Ad cor) Ungimus locum cordis Oleo divinitus sanctificato, coelesti munere nobis attributo, in nomine Sanctae et Individuae Trinitatis, ut ipsa interius exteriusque te sanando vivificet, quae universum ne pereat continent: per Christum Dominum nostrum. Amen.

(Ad scapulas) Ungimus has scapulas, sive in medio scapularum Oleo sacrato, in nomine Patris, et Filii, et Spiritus Sancti, ut ex omni parte spirituali protectione munitus, jacula diabolici impetus viriliter contemnere, ac procul possis cum robore superni juvaminis repellere: per Christum Dominum nostrum. Amen.

(Ad manus) Ungimus has manus Oleo sacro, in nomine Patris, et Filii, et Spiritus Sancti, ut quidquid illicito opera, vel noxio peregerunt, per hanc sanctam unctionem evacuetur: per Christum Dominum nostrum. Amen.

(Ad pedes) Ungimus hos pedes Oleo benedicto, in nomine Patris, et Filii, et Spiritus Sancti, ut quidquid superfluo, vel nocivo incessu commiserunt, ista aboleat perunctio: per Christum Dominum nostrum. Amen.

=== Eastern Orthodox Church ===
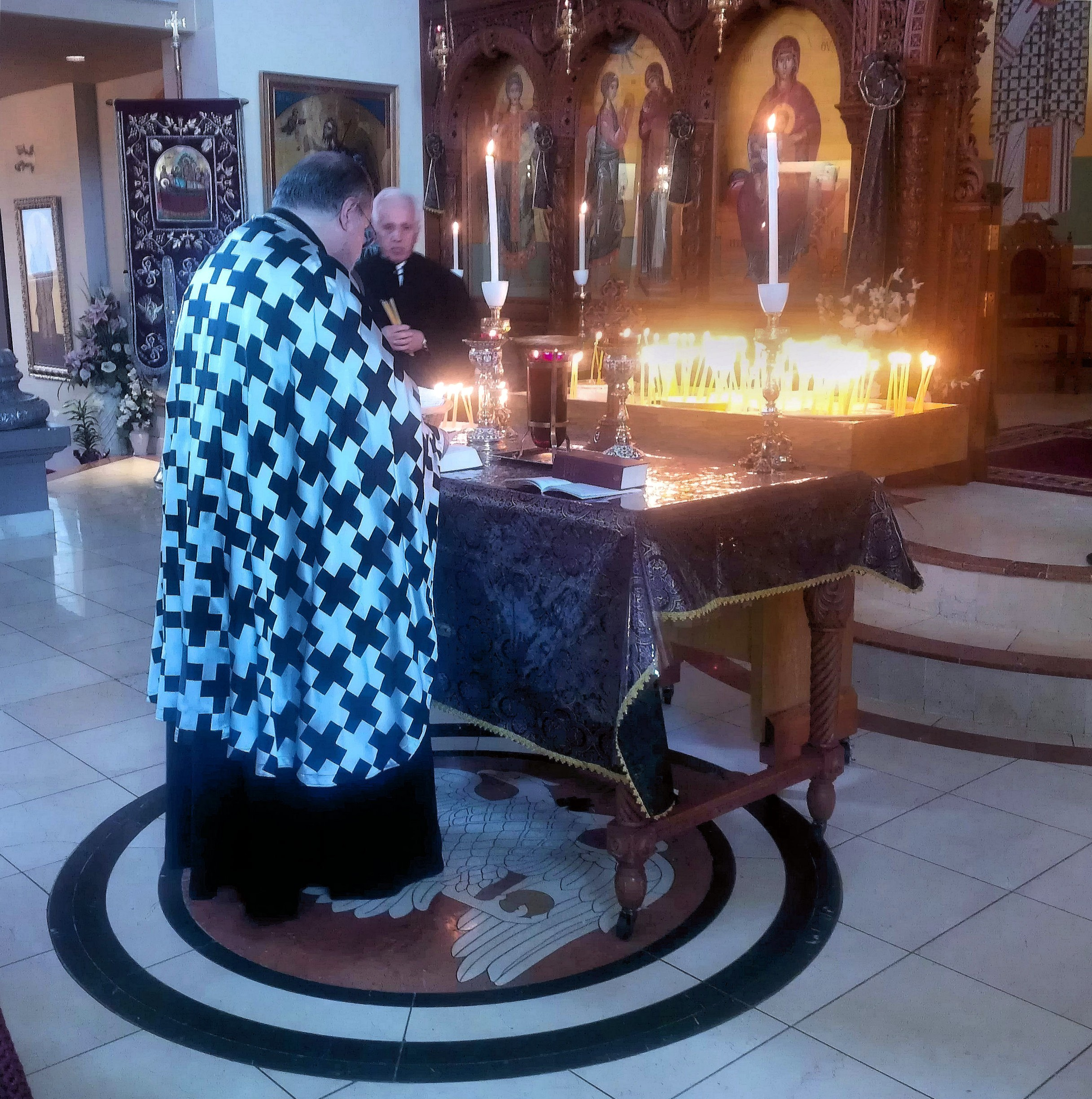
Service of the Sacrament of Holy Unction served on Great and Holy Wednesday

The teaching of the Eastern Orthodox Church on the Holy Mystery (sacrament) of Unction is similar to that of the Roman Catholic Church. However, the reception of the Mystery is not limited to those who are enduring physical illness. The Mystery is given for healing (both physical and spiritual) and for the forgiveness of sin. For this reason, it is normally required that one go to confession before receiving Unction. Because it is a Sacred Mystery of the Church, only Orthodox Christians may receive it.

The solemn form of Eastern Christian anointing requires the ministry of seven priests. A table is prepared, upon which is set a vessel containing wheat. Into the wheat has been placed an empty shrine-lamp, seven candles, and seven anointing brushes. Candles are distributed for all to hold during the service. The rite begins with reading Psalm 50 (the great penitential psalm), followed by the chanting of a special canon. After this, the senior priest (or bishop) pours pure olive oil and a small amount of wine into the shrine lamp, and says the "Prayer of the Oil", which calls upon God to "...sanctify this Oil, that it may be effectual for those who shall be anointed therewith, unto healing, and unto relief from every passion, every malady of the flesh and of the spirit, and every ill..." Then follow seven series of epistles, gospels, long prayers, Ektenias (litanies) and anointings. Each series is served by one of the seven priests in turn. The afflicted one is anointed with the sign of the cross on seven places: the forehead, the nostrils, the cheeks, the lips, the breast, the palms of both hands, and the back of the hands. After the last anointing, the Gospel Book is opened and placed with the writing down upon the head of the one who was anointed, and the senior priest reads the "Prayer of the Gospel". At the end, the anointed kisses the Gospel, the Cross and the right hands of the priests, receiving their blessing.

Anointing is considered to be a public rather than a private sacrament, and so as many of the faithful who are able are encouraged to attend. It should be celebrated in the church when possible, but if this is impossible, it may be served in the home or hospital room of the afflicted.

Unction in the Greek Orthodox Church and Churches of Hellenic custom (Antiochian Eastern Orthodox, Melkite, etc.) is usually given with a minimum of ceremony.

Anointing may also be given during Forgiveness Vespers and Great Week, on Great and Holy Wednesday, to all who are prepared. Those who receive Unction on Holy Wednesday should go to Holy Communion on Great Thursday. The significance of receiving Unction on Holy Wednesday is shored up by the hymns in the Triodion for that day, which speak of the sinful woman who anointed the feet of Christ. Just as her sins were forgiven because of her penitence, so the faithful are exhorted to repent of their sins. In the same narrative, Jesus says, "in that she hath poured this ointment on my body, she did it for my burial" (Id., v. 12), linking the unction with Christ's death and resurrection.

In some dioceses of the Russian Orthodox Church it is customary for the bishop to visit each parish or region of the diocese some time during Great Lent and give Anointing for the faithful, together with the local clergy.

In 2012 Holy Synod of the Russian Orthodox Church approved abridged rite of Holy Unction for hospital use.

=== Oriental Orthodox Churches ===
The Oriental Orthodox Churches regards anointing of the sick as one of the seven sacraments.

==== Armenian Orthodox Church ====
From the 4th to the 15th centuries, the Armenian Church administered the sacrament of the unction of the sick. This is recorded in the Church Canons and commentary works. However, beginning in the 15th century, the Armenian Church did not refuse, but abstained from conducting the sacrament in order to resist the influence of the Catholic Church, over time, being left out of liturgical life, deeming sufficient the laying on of hands and the administration of the Sacraments of Penance and Holy Communion.

Instead of the sacrament being used for anointing of the sick, in the Armenian Church unction is administered at the time of Baptism, particularly at Chrismation. In addition, the Armenian Church has the tradition of anointing the sick with blessed oil or water into which Holy Chrism has been poured during the Blessing of Water service in memory of the Lord's Baptism at Theophany. But this Chrism and the anointment of the body of a deceased clergyman with Holy Chrism has nothing to do with extreme unction or the sacrament of anointing the sick, although some Armenians may conflate the two. This tradition is still in force, and there is no objection if the sick are anointed, believing that the Holy Myron will always transfer the gifts of the Holy Spirit as long as they are alive and conscious of their Christian faith. Archbishop Malachia explains:

That which is called extreme unction is not in use; the various attempts that have been made to introduce it into the Church have hardly been successful. The wish expressed, to substitute for the unction the prayers used for the dying, cannot sufficiently satisfy the essential conditions which are required for sacraments. It is seen, therefore, that the doctrine of the seven sacraments cannot be accepted by the Armenians. Excepting extreme unction, all the others are administered in the Armenian Church.

=== Hussite Church ===
The Hussite Church regards anointing of the sick as one of the seven sacraments.

=== Anabaptist churches ===
Anabaptists observe the ordinance of anointing of the sick in obedience to James 5:14–15, with it being counted among the seven ordinances by Conservative Mennonite Anabaptists. In a compendium of Anabaptist doctrine, theologian Daniel Kauffman stated:

We incline to the belief, however, that the apostle intended that the oil should be applied as a religious rite, because:

1. The sick were commanded to send for the elders of the church. Had this been strictly a sanitary affair, he would have commanded them to send for a physician.

2. The apostle says: "The prayer of faith shall save the sick." This leads us to the belief that he intended the oil (the natural use of which is to heal) to be used as a symbol of the grace of God, which, in answer to the prayer of the righteous, He applies as a soothing balm to the natural and the spiritual infirmities of suffering man.

The 2021 Church Polity of the Dunkard Brethren Church, a Conservative Anabaptist denomination in the Schwarzenau Brethren tradition, teaches:

We believe the anointing of the sick is an appointment of the Lord, and that it was intended to be perpetuated in His Church. At the request of an ill member, the Elders of the Church are contacted to do this work. "Is any sick among you? Let him call for the elders of the church and let them pray over him, anointing him with oil in the name of the Lord." (James 5:14) The scriptural specification is for the anointing to be performed by two Elders. In practice, the Church has permitted a Minister, or a Deacon to assist an Elder, when a second Elder is not available. (James 5:14; Matt. 10:8)

=== Lutheran churches ===
Anointing of the sick has been retained some in Lutheran churches since the Reformation. Although it is not considered a sacrament like baptism, confession and the Eucharist, it is known as a ritual in the same respect as confirmation, holy orders, and matrimony.

==== Liturgy ====
After the penitent has received absolution following confession, the presiding minister recites James 5:14-16. He goes on to recite the following:

[Name], you have confessed your sins and received Holy Absolution. In remembrance of the grace of God given by the Holy Spirit in the waters of Holy Baptism, I will anoint you with oil. Confident in our Lord and in love for you, we also pray for you that you will not lose faith. Knowing that in Godly patience the Church endures with you and supports you during this affliction. We firmly believe that this illness is for the glory of God and that the Lord will both hear our prayer and work according to His good and gracious will.

He anoints the person on the forehead and says this blessing:

Almighty God, the Father of our Lord Jesus Christ, who has given you the new birth of water and the Spirit and has forgiven you all your sins, strengthen you with His grace to life everlasting. Amen.

=== Anglican churches ===
The 1552 and later editions of the Book of Common Prayer omitted the form of anointing given in the original (1549) version in its Order for the Visitation of the Sick, but most twentieth-century Anglican prayer books do have anointing of the sick. The Book of Common Prayer (1662) and the proposed revision of 1928 include the "visitation of the sick" and "communion of the sick" (which consist of various prayers, exhortations and psalms).

Some Anglicans accept that anointing of the sick has a sacramental character and is therefore a channel of God's grace, seeing it as an "outward and visible sign of an inward and spiritual grace" which is the definition of a sacrament. The Catechism of the Episcopal Church of the United States of America includes Unction of the Sick as among the "other sacramental rites" and it states that unction can be done with oil or simply with laying on of hands. The rite of anointing is included in the Episcopal Church's "Ministration to the Sick".

Article 25 of the Thirty-Nine Articles, which are one of the historical formularies of the Church of England (and as such, the Anglican Communion), speaking of the sacraments, says: "Those five commonly called Sacraments, that is to say, Confirmation, Penance, Orders, Matrimony, and extreme Unction, are not to be counted for Sacraments of the Gospel, being such as have grown partly of the corrupt following of the Apostles, partly are states of life allowed in the Scriptures; but yet have not like nature of Sacraments with Baptism, and the Lord's Supper, for that they have not any visible sign or ceremony ordained of God."

In 1915 members of the Anglican Communion founded the Guild of St Raphael, an organisation dedicated to promoting, supporting and practising Christ's ministry of healing.

=== Other Protestant communities ===
Protestants provide anointing in a wide variety of formats. Protestant communities generally vary widely on the sacramental character of anointing. Most Mainline Protestants recognize two sacraments, the eucharist and baptism, and believe that anointing is a humanly-instituted rite. Newer Protestant communities generally use the term ordinance rather than sacrament.

==== Mainline beliefs ====
Liturgical or Mainline Protestant communities (e.g. Presbyterian, Congregationalist/United Church of Christ, Methodist, etc.) all have official yet often optional liturgical rites for the anointing of the sick partly on the model of Western pre-Reformation rites. Anointing need not be associated with grave illness or imminent danger of death.

==== Charismatic and Pentecostal beliefs ====
In Charismatic and Pentecostal communities, anointing of the sick is a frequent practice and has been an important ritual in these communities since the respective movements were founded in the 19th and 20th centuries. These communities use extemporaneous forms of administration at the discretion of the minister, who need not be a pastor. There is minimal ceremony attached to its administration. Usually, several people physically touch (laying on of hands) the recipient during the anointing. It may be part of a worship service with the full assembly of the congregation present, or in more private settings, such as homes or hospital rooms. Some Pentecostals believe that physical healing is within the anointing and so there is often great expectation or at least great hope that a miraculous cure or improvement will occur when someone is being prayed over for healing.

==== Evangelical and fundamentalist beliefs ====
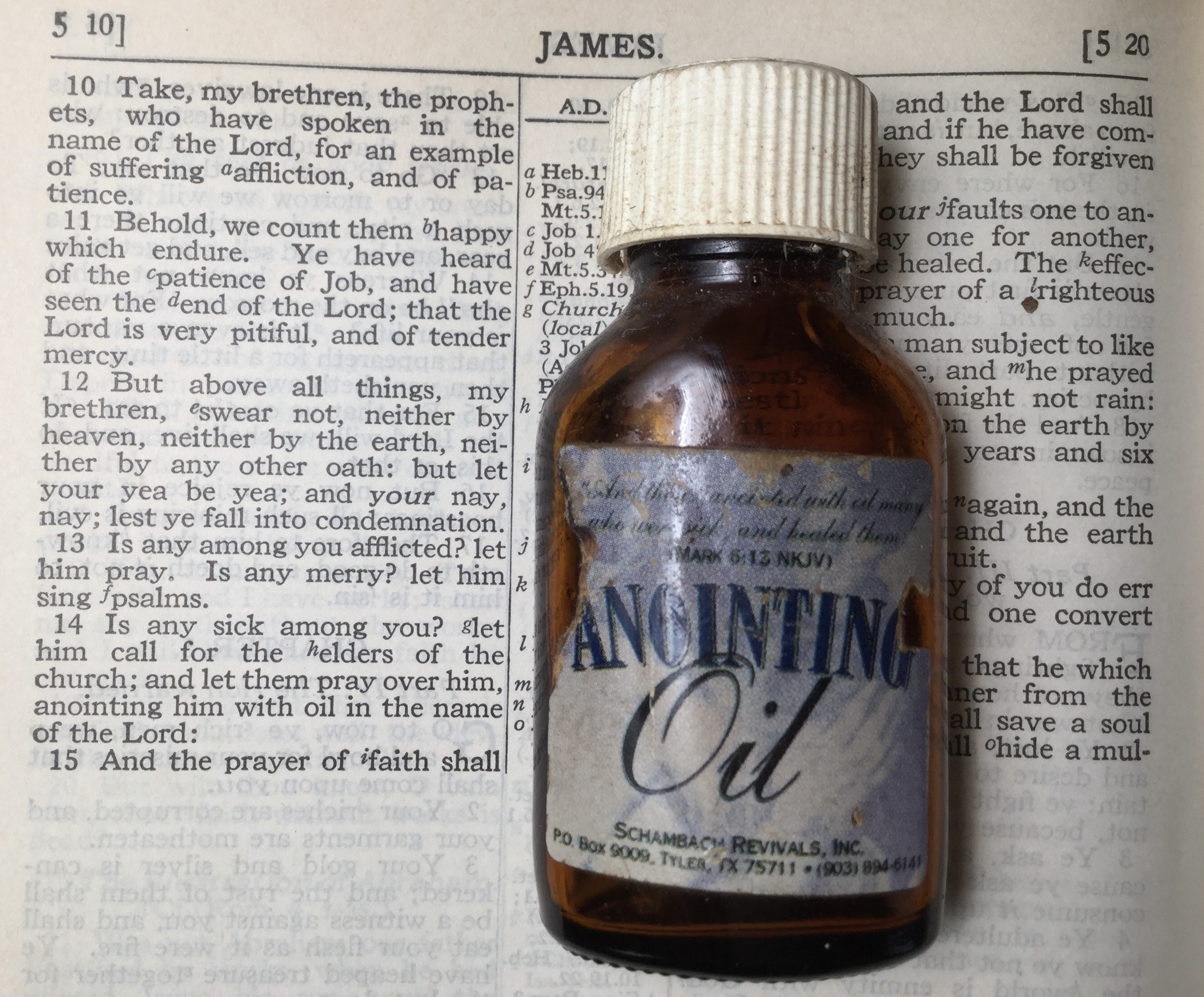
R. W. Schambach anointing oil

In Evangelical and Fundamentalist communities, anointing of the sick is performed with varying degrees of frequency, although laying on of hands may be more common than anointing. The rite would be similar to that of Pentecostals in its simplicity, but would usually not have the same emotionalism attached to it. Unlike some Pentecostals, Evangelicals and Fundamentalists generally do not believe that physical healing is within the anointing. Therefore, God may or may not grant physical healing to the sick. The healing conferred by anointing is thus a spiritual event that may not result in physical recovery.

The Church of the Brethren practices Anointing with Oil as an ordinance along with Baptism, Communion, Laying on of Hands, and the Love Feast.

Evangelical Protestants who use anointing differ about whether the person doing the anointing must be an ordained member of the clergy, whether the oil must necessarily be olive oil and have been previously specially consecrated, and about other details. Several Evangelical groups reject the practice so as not to be identified with charismatic and Pentecostal groups, which practice it widely.

=== Latter Day Saint movement ===
==== Church of Jesus Christ of Latter-day Saints ====
Latter-day Saints, who consider themselves restorationists, also practice ritual anointing of the sick, as well as other forms of anointing. Members of the Church of Jesus Christ of Latter-day Saints (LDS Church) consider anointing to be an ordinance.

Members of the LDS Church who hold the Melchizedek priesthood may use consecrated olive oil in performing the ordinance of blessing of the "sick or afflicted", though oil is not required if it is unavailable. The priesthood holder anoints the recipient's head with a drop of oil, then lays hands upon that head and declare their act of anointing. Then another priesthood holder joins in, if available, and pronounces a "sealing" of the anointing and other words of blessing, as he feels inspired. Melchizedek priesthood holders are also authorized to consecrate any pure olive oil and often carry a personal supply in case they have need to perform an anointing. Oil is not used in other blessings, such as for people seeking comfort or counsel.

In addition to the James 5:14-15 reference, the Doctrine and Covenants contains numerous references to the anointing and healing of the sick by those with authority to do so.

==== Community of Christ ====
Administration to the sick is one of the eight sacraments of the Community of Christ, in which it has also been used for people seeking spiritual, emotional or mental healing.

== See also ==
- Anointing of the Sick in the Catholic Church
- Faith healing
