= Baptism in Mormonism =

Baptism practiced in the Latter Day Saint movement

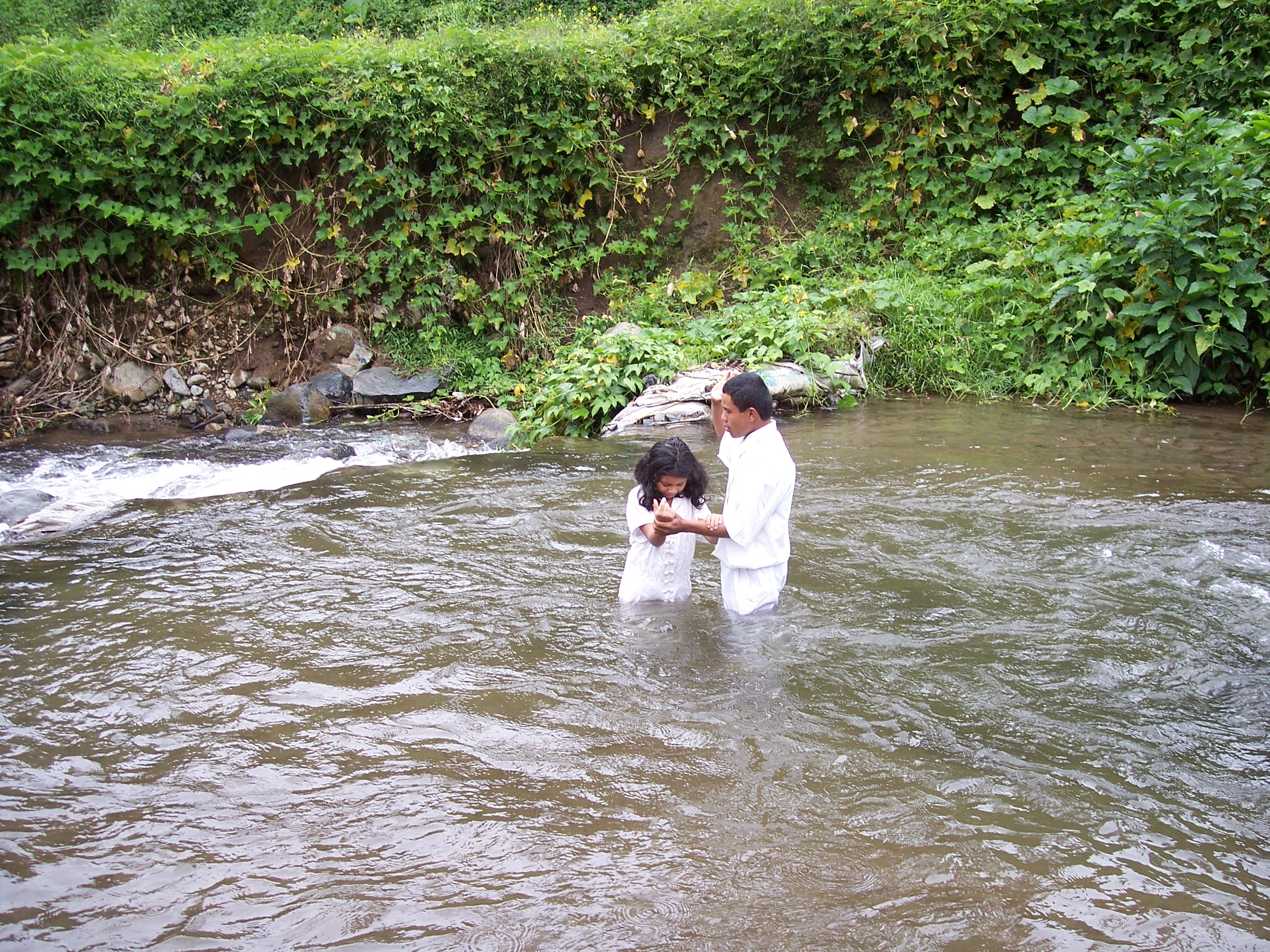
A young man baptizing a child into the LDS Church in Panama

In the Latter Day Saint movement, baptism is recognized as the first of several ordinances (rituals) of the gospel.

== Overview ==
Much of the Latter Day Saint theology of baptism was established during the early Latter Day Saint movement founded by Joseph Smith. Baptism must be by immersion and is for the remission of sins (meaning that through baptism, past sins are forgiven), and occurs after one has shown faith and repentance. Latter Day Saint baptism does not purport to remit any sins other than personal ones, as adherents do not believe in original sin. Baptisms also occur only after an "age of accountability" which is defined as the age of eight years. The theology thus rejects infant baptism. According to the account in Joseph Smith–History 1:68, the first Latter Day Saint baptisms occurred on May 15, 1829, when Smith and Oliver Cowdery baptized each other in the Susquehanna River near Harmony, Pennsylvania shortly after receiving the Aaronic priesthood from John the Baptist.

In addition, Latter Day Saint theology requires baptism only be performed by a priesthood holder. The minimum required priesthood level to perform a baptism in Mormonism is nominally priest. Within the Church of Jesus Christ of Latter-day Saints (LDS Church), the largest denomination in the Latter Day Saint movement, this is a worthy male member who is at least 15 years old, and the rite is further overseen by a bishop. Because the churches of the Latter Day Saint movement operate under a lay priesthood, children raised in a Latter Day Saint family are usually baptized by a father or close male friend or family member.

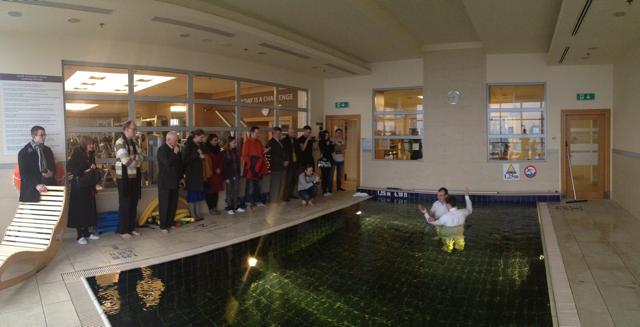
Mormon baptism

Latter Day Saints view baptism as symbolic of the death, burial and resurrection of Jesus, and also symbolic of the baptized individual separating from the "natural" or sinful aspects of humanity and becoming spiritually reborn as a disciple of Jesus.

Membership into a Latter Day Saint church is granted only by baptism. Latter Day Saint churches do not recognize the baptisms of other faiths as they believe baptisms must be performed under the church's unique priesthood authority. Therefore, any converts are baptized at their conversion.

Baptism (and any subsequent callings in the church) are preceded by a baptismal interview.

== Procedures ==
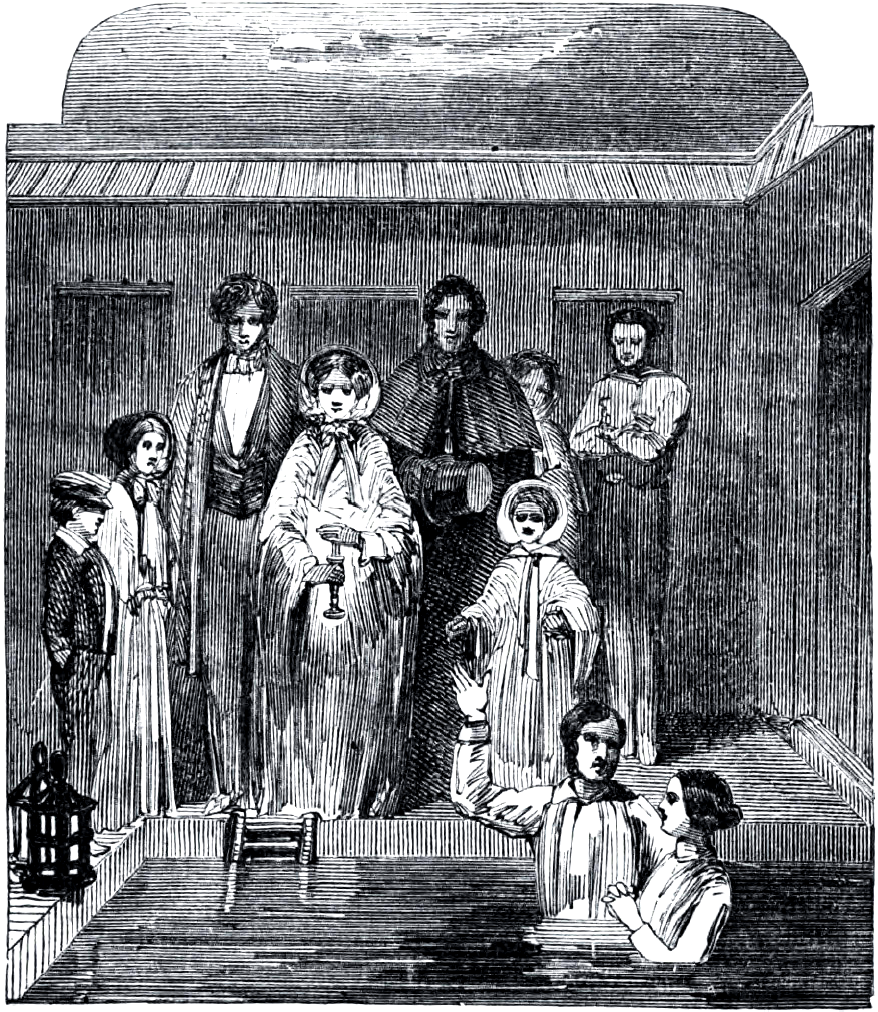
Artist's depiction of a Latter Day Saint baptism including the all-white clothing, c. 1850.

Section 20 of the Doctrine and Covenants first documented the instructions for Latter Day Saint baptism.

"The person who is called of God and has authority from Jesus Christ to baptize, shall go down into the water with the person who has presented himself or herself for baptism, and shall say, calling him or her by name: Having been commissioned of Jesus Christ, I baptize you in the name of the Father, and of the Son, and of the Holy Ghost. Amen. Then shall he immerse him or her in the water, and come forth again out of the water."

People being baptized or performing the baptism typically wear a "one-piece suit" with "short sleeves, and is lined to the knee." Baptisms are usually performed in a baptismal font, but any body of water in which the person may be completely immersed is acceptable. The person administering the baptism must recite the prayer exactly, and immerse every part, limb, hair and clothing of the person being baptized. If there are any mistakes, or if any part of the person being baptized is not fully immersed, the baptism is repeated until it is performed correctly. In addition to the baptizer, two church members witness the baptism to ensure that it is performed properly.

Following baptism, Latter Day Saints receive the Gift of the Holy Ghost by the laying on of hands of a Melchizedek priesthood holder.

== Baptism for the dead ==
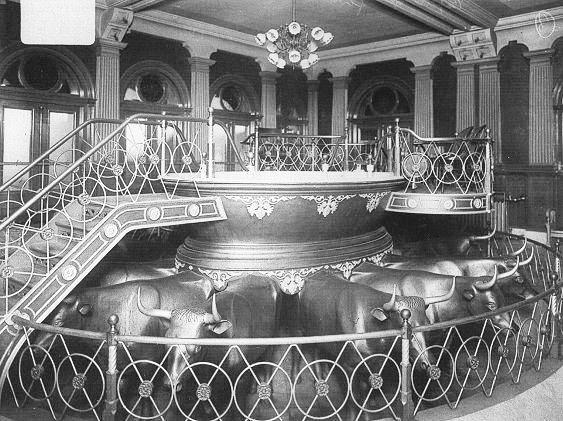
Baptismal font in the Salt Lake Temple, c. 1912, where baptisms for the dead are performed by the LDS Church

The LDS Church practices baptism for the dead "vicariously" or "by proxy" in temples for anyone who did not receive these ordinances while living.

== Rebaptism ==
Rebaptism is also practiced in the Latter Day Saint movement, currently by the LDS Church and the Community of Christ, primarily as a means of readmittance into the respective church.

=== Latter Day Saint movement ===
In late 1839, the Church of Jesus Christ of Latter Day Saints (by an 1838 revelation) was relocated to Nauvoo, Illinois. Many who were already baptized members of the church, were rebaptised either to show a renewal of their commitment to the movement or as part of a healing ordinance.

=== LDS Church ===
The LDS Church does not recognize baptisms performed by any other denomination. All converts to the church must be baptized under the direction of local church leaders. In this sense, the church practices rebaptism.

In addition, while LDS scripture makes it clear that baptism is necessary for salvation, early church leaders stated that there is no scriptural prohibition against being baptized more than once. Members would often be rebaptized before serving missions or when marrying, to show determination to follow the gospel during their mission or marriage.

After the death of Joseph Smith in 1844, rebaptism became a more important ordinance in the LDS Church, as led by Brigham Young. Young led his group to the Great Basin in what is now Utah, and most of his followers were rebaptized soon after arriving as a sign that they would rededicate their lives to Christ. During the "Mormon Reformation" of 1856–57, rebaptism became an extremely important ordinance, signifying that the church member confessed their sins and would live a life of a Latter-day Saint. Church members were rebaptized prior to new covenants and ordinances, such as ordination to a new office of the priesthood, receiving temple ordinances, getting married, or entering plural marriage. In an 1881 letter from apostle Joseph F. Smith, he stated, "all persons whose first baptisms have not taken place within a very recent period must be re-baptized before they receive their recommends to pass through the House of the Lord."

In addition to acting as a sign of repentance and recommitment, rebaptism was also seen as a healing ordinance frequently practiced in the temple as such until around 1922 when the church's First Presidency issued a letter stating that "baptizing for health is no part of temple work, and therefore to permit it to become a practice would be an innovation, detrimental to temple work, and a departure as well from the practice instituted of the Lord for the care and healing of the sick."

Rebaptism remains a practice in the LDS Church today but is practiced only when a member whose membership was previously withdrawn (formerly called excommunication) or resigned rejoins the church. In such cases, the wording of the ordinance is identical to that of the first baptismal ordinance.

==== Groups ineligible to perform and receive LDS baptisms ====
Some groups of people were historically or are currently ineligible for performing, receiving, and/or participating in the ordinances of baptism and/or baptisms for the dead. Priesthood ordination to at least the office of a priest is required before performing any baptisms, and all women are barred from LDS priesthood ordination. For about 130 years (between 1847 and 1978) priesthood ordinations were also denied to all Black men in a controversial priesthood racial restriction. From the mid-1960s until the early 1970s under church president David O. McKay, Black members of all genders were barred from participating in any baptisms for the dead.

As of 2023, all priesthood ordinations, baptisms, and participating in baptisms for the dead continue to be denied for any person in a same-sex marriage or homosexual sexual relationship, and transgender individuals including trans men continue to be ineligible for all priesthood ordinations. Baptismal candidates considering gender-affirming surgery like chest surgery (i.e. top surgery) are not allowed to be baptized, and those who have already had such surgery need special clearance from the First Presidency through the local full-time mission president before baptism.

Subsequent ordinances such as receiving the priesthood necessary to perform baptisms or participating in baptisms for the dead are only done according to birth sex. Transgender individuals who are "attempting to transition to the opposite gender" cannot maintain a temple recommends necessary for baptisms for the dead. These restrictions have also garnered criticism from both outside, and inside the LDS church.

=== Community of Christ ===
Among the Latter Day Saints who remained in the Midwest, rebaptism generally has been practiced only when an excommunicate rejoins the church. When Joseph Smith III and his mother, Emma Hale Smith Bidamon, joined with the "New Organization" of the church in 1860, their original baptisms were considered sufficient. The organization, now known as the Community of Christ, occasionally cited its avoidance of rebaptism as proof that it is the true continuation of the original Latter Day Saint church.

== See also ==
- Anabaptists
- Baptism for the dead
- Believer's baptism
- Baptismal clothing: Latter-day Saint tradition
