= Sacrament (Community of Christ) =

Sacrament in the Community of Christ

The sacraments are viewed as vital ministries in Community of Christ for both individual and community spiritual development. They are viewed as essential to the mission, identity and message of the denomination, providing a common foundation for religious practice across the world. The sacraments practiced by Community of Christ are baptism, confirmation, the Lord's supper, marriage, administration to the sick, ordination, blessing of children, and evangelist's blessing. These latter two are not widely practiced as sacraments in other Christian denominations. Community of Christ does not observe confession as a sacrament.

== Baptism ==
For Community of Christ, baptism is a covenant entered into between the individual and God. It is an expression of their faith and trust in God. A Person is baptized into Community of Christ and becomes a member of that particular fellowship. Baptism also signifies commitment to the universal task of Christianity to which the contributions of other Christians are acknowledged and appreciated. Community of Christ requires that persons reach the "age of accountability" before becoming baptized. That age has been identified as at least eight years of age. The term "age of accountability" also suggests that a person is accountable to God for their decisions, their resources, and their whole lives. In Community of Christ tradition a person is baptized by immersion. Emerging from the water symbolizes resurrection and the rising to a new life. The sacrament of baptism may be performed by members of the Melchisedec priesthood or by Aaronic priests. The 2007 World Conference of Community of Christ passed a resolution requesting the First Presidency to examine the issue of rebaptism as a condition for membership in those cases where the potential member is already a baptized Christian.

== Confirmation ==
Confirmation, known also as baptism of the Holy Spirit, follows baptism by water and completes a person's initiation into the church. The only prerequisite for the rite of confirmation is that a person is baptized into Community of Christ. Normally several days or weeks elapse between baptism and confirmation. Sometimes this sacrament occurs immediately following baptism in the same service of worship. Confirmation is administered by the laying on of hands. Typically the candidate sits in a chair and two members of the Melchisedec priesthood lay their hands on the candidate's head, one offering the prayer of confirmation. There are no prescribed words that must be included in the prayer of confirmation.

== Blessing of children ==
The blessing of children recognizes the entrance of a new life into the church community. It is based primarily on the Gospel accounts of Jesus receiving and blessing children and symbolizes and demonstrates God's love and concern for the child. Children from birth to the eighth birthday are eligible for blessing. Typically, children of members of the church are presented for blessing during the first six months after birth, but older children and children of friends of the church may also be blessed. This sacrament is performed by Melchisedec priesthood members.

== The Lord's Supper ==
The Lord's Supper is regularly celebrated on the first Sunday of each month, and additional special occasions. To various people it is seen in different ways. It is one of three sacraments with prescribed words in Community of Christ. Traditionally unfermented grape juice and whole wheat bread have been used as the wine and bread, but other similar emblems may be used to celebrate the sacrament depending on location, culture, need, and availability. This sacrament is administered by Melchisedec priesthood members or by Aaronic priests.

== Marriage ==
Community of Christ recognizes that marriage is subject to legal provisions established by various nations and states making it unique among the church's sacraments. Marriages within the church are solemnized in public meeting of some kind. This usually occurs in the context of a service of worship. Marriages within the church are performed by members of the Melchisedec priesthood or by Aaronic priests. The church also recognizes the marriages of persons who choose to be married by authorities outside the church, such as civil authorities or ministers of other faiths.

== Administration to the sick ==
This sacrament, known also as Anointing of the Sick, is available to both members and nonmembers. A person who is physically ill, emotionally strained, or sick in any other way may request administration. The purpose of this sacrament is to provide assurance of God's care and concern and also of the church's interest in that person. Administration is usually done with just the presence of the administering priesthood members in the privacy of the church, a person's home, office, or hospital room. On occasion, however, administration may be performed while other persons are present or as part of a formal service of worship. This sacrament is administered by members of the Melchisedec priesthood.

== Ordination ==
Ordination is the rite by which priesthood authority and responsibilities are conferred. Ordination grants the authority to perform certain duties. This authority is given to the individual by God and also by the church. Although God's call is primary in the ordination process for the church, the individual's own sense of call is also important.

== Evangelist's blessing ==
Formerly known as a patriarchal blessing, the evangelist's blessing serves as an opportunity for God to affirm and support persons in their life ventures. It is an experience of laying on of hands and prayer focusing on God’s accepting and creative love in the life of the person, family, or congregation. The blessing is a defining experience to help persons know who they are, their value and giftedness, purpose and meanings of life. It helps persons to refocus their lives according to the purposes of God and God’s call to them. The sacrament may be extended to individuals, families, or congregations. There are no age, race, gender, membership, or life conditions that restrict persons from sharing in this sacrament. Recording of the blessing is optional. An evangelist's blessing may be requested more than once, at different junctures of a person’s life. Sharing with the evangelist as a spiritual companion is an integral part of the total blessing experience. This sacrament is performed by members of the Order of Evangelists.
