= Confirmation (Latter Day Saints) =

Sacred ordinance and ceremony

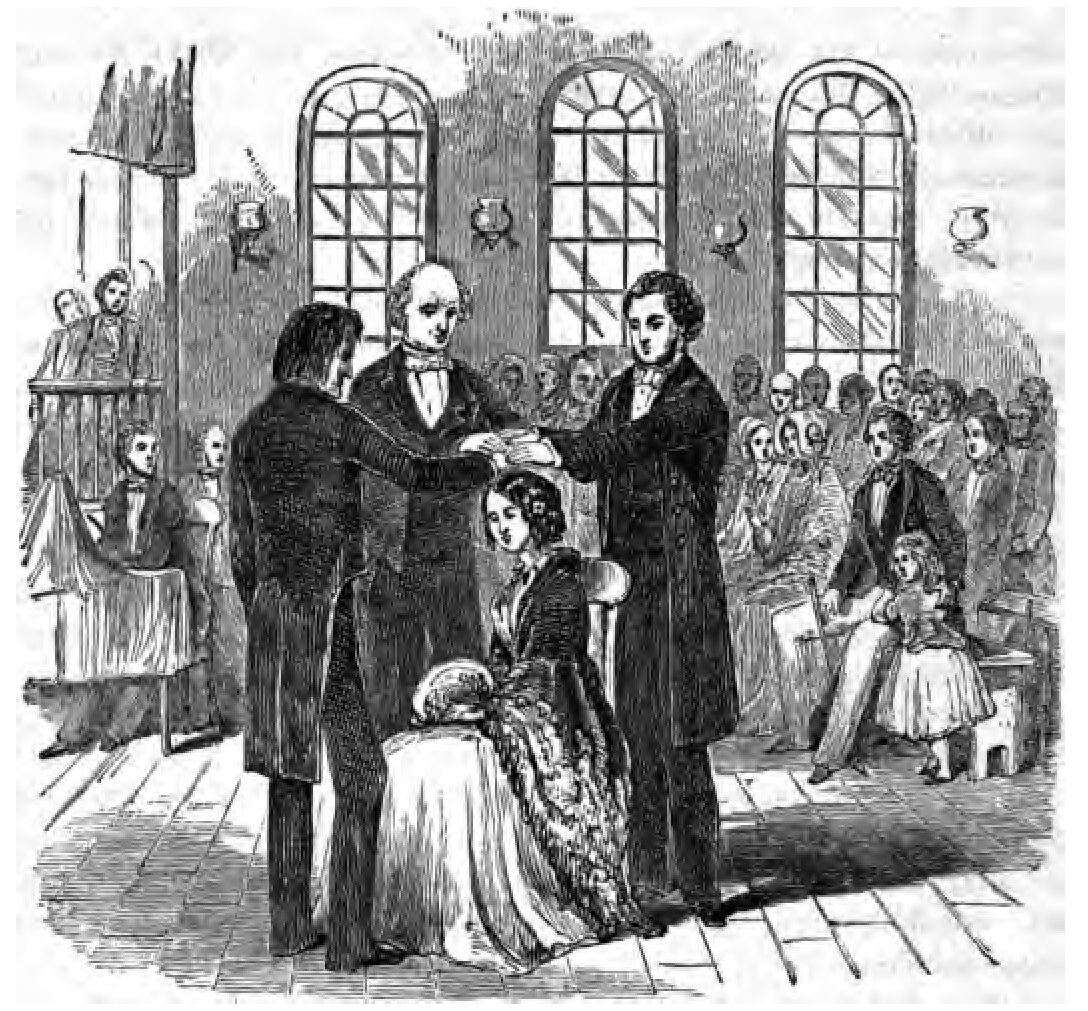
A Latter Day Saint confirmation.

In the Latter Day Saint movement, confirmation, also known as the gift of the Holy Ghost or the baptism of fire and of the Holy Ghost, is an ordinance essential for salvation. It involves the laying on of hands and is performed after baptism. Through confirmation, the initiate becomes an official member of the church and receives the gift of the Holy Ghost. Baptism and confirmation are administered to persons at least eight years old (the age of accountability). The ordinance corresponds to the confirmation rite in many other Christian faiths. Confirmations were first performed on April 6, 1830, at the organizational meeting of the Church of Christ.

The gift of the Holy Ghost is considered the fourth of the "first principles and ordinances of the Gospel": First being "Faith in the Lord Jesus Christ; second, Repentance; third, Baptism by immersion for the remission of sins; fourth, Laying on of hands for the gift of the Holy Ghost". The Church of Jesus Christ of Latter-day Saints teaches that these two ordinances are necessary for all mankind, so they perform both baptisms and confirmations by proxy on behalf of the dead in their temples.

== Significance ==
Joseph Smith taught the need for both water baptism and the laying on of hands for the gift of the Holy Ghost: "The baptism of water, without the baptism of fire and the Holy Ghost attending it, is of no use," he declared. "They are necessarily and inseparably connected. An individual must be born of water and the spirit in order to get into the kingdom of God". According to standard Latter Day Saint theology, the gift of the Holy Ghost is the privilege of receiving inspiration, divine manifestations, direction, and other blessings from the Holy Spirit which are not available to those who have not received the ordinance. These include cautions, warnings, and discernment of right and wrong. The gift of the Holy Ghost is the key to all of the spiritual gifts operating in the church, including prophecy and revelation.

Latter Day Saints believe that people who have not received the gift of the Holy Ghost are able to feel the influence of the Holy Ghost from time to time and the inspiration of the light of Christ (conscience) as they listen to spiritual promptings, but those who have been baptized and confirmed to receive the gift of the Holy Ghost will always feel his companionship, as long as they remain worthy of it. Latter Day Saints believe that the state of worthiness is maintained through ongoing repentance and discipleship. Latter Day Saints believe that a person who has received the gift of the Holy Ghost will lose the benefit of its promptings if they commit a major sin (until they repent) or if they exercise "compulsion upon the souls of the children of men, in any degree of unrighteousness".

Latter Day Saints believe that the Holy Spirit is the sanctifier, and his sanctifying influence is called the "baptism of fire". Latter Day Saints believe that through the baptism of fire and the Holy Ghost, the heart and desires are cleansed and purified. However, confirmation is not the end but the beginning of the lifetime process of sanctification. Receiving the Holy Ghost includes inviting him into one's daily life as a "constant companion", which is believed to give strength, guidance, and enlightenment. Latter Day Saints believe that the performance of the ordinance alone is not enough to insure actual reception of the Spirit but depends on the humility, faith, and worthiness of the individual.

== Administration ==
Whereas Priests are able to baptize, only those who have the Melchizedek Priesthood are able to confirm newly baptized members such that they can receive the gift of the Holy Ghost. The ordinance is usually performed during a baptismal service or a fast and testimony meeting in the following manner:

One or more bearers of the Melchizedek Priesthood lay their hands on the head of the newly baptized person, and the one who is "voice", calling the person by name, says words to this effect: "In the name of Jesus Christ, and by the authority of the holy Melchizedek Priesthood, I confirm you a member of The Church of Jesus Christ of Latter-day Saints and say unto you, 'receive the Holy Ghost.'" Words of blessing follow as the Spirit of the Lord may dictate, invoking divine guidance, comfort, admonition, instruction, or promise. The initiates are often reminded that through this gift they will discern right from wrong and that the Spirit will be, as it were, a lamp to their feet.

== See also ==
- Baptism by fire
