= Lourd =

Lourd may refer to:

- Billie Lourd (born 1992), U.S. actress
- Bryan Lourd (born 1960), U.S. talent agent
- Lourd de Veyra (born 1975), Filipino musician

== See also ==
- Thomas Lourds, a novel series and its titular character by Charles Brokaw
- "Lourds", a 2011 song by Damon Albarn off the album Kinshasa One Two
- Pesante
- Lord (disambiguation)
- Lorde (disambiguation)
- Lourde (disambiguation)
- Lourdes (disambiguation)
- Lords (disambiguation)
