= Lord House (disambiguation) =

The Lord House is located in Lords Valley, Pennsylvania.

Lord House may also refer to:

- Lord Farm in Wells, Maine
- Lord Mansion in Kennebunk, Maine
- Capt. Nathaniel Lord Mansion in Kennebunkport, Maine
- Lord-Dane House in Alfred, Maine
- Lord's Castle in Waltham, Massachusetts

== See also ==
- House (disambiguation)
- House of Lords (disambiguation)
- Lord (disambiguation)
- The House of the Lord, a 1912 book by James E. Talmage
- Lords Hoese, an English noble house
