= Lorde (disambiguation) =

Lorde (born 1996; as Ella Marija Lani Yelich-O'Connor) is a New Zealand singer-songwriter.

Lorde may also refer to:

== People and characters ==
=== People ===
- André de Lorde (1869-1942), French playwright, "prince of terror", known for the Grand Guignol
- Audre Lorde (1934–1992), American writer and civil rights activist
- Elizabeth Lorde (died 1551), English prioress

== Places ==
- Lorde (crater), a crater on Mercury

== Other uses ==
- Lorde, an archaic spelling of Lord
- Lourdaise (Occitan: Lordés), a breed of cattle found in Gascony, an Occitan region of France

== See also ==
- Gruta de Lordes (Our Lady of Lourdes), San Pedro de Colalao, Argentina
- Júlia Daltoé Lordes (born 2001), Brazilian soccer player
- Lordi, Finnish hard rock band
- Lord (disambiguation)
- Lourd
- Lourde (disambiguation)
- Lourdes (disambiguation)
- Lords (disambiguation)
