= House of Lords (disambiguation) =

The House of Lords is the upper house of the Parliament of the United Kingdom.

House of Lords may also refer to:

== Upper houses ==
- Irish House of Lords, the upper house of the former Parliament of Ireland in 1297–1800
- Chamber of Peers (France), the upper house of the Kingdom of France, 1814–1848.
- Prussian House of Lords (1850–1918), the upper house of the Kingdom of Prussia
- House of Lords (Austria), the upper house of the Imperial Council of the Austro-Hungarian Empire, 1867–1918
- House of Nobility (Sweden), the house of the Swedish nobility
- House of Nobility (Finland), the house of the Finnish nobility
- House of Magnates in Hungary, which functioned as the House of Lords
- Cromwell's House of Lords (1658–1659) during the final years of the Protectorate

== Other ==
- The House of Lords (restaurant), Dutch former Michelin starred restaurant
- House of Lords (Lords of the Underground album), 2007
- House of Lords (band), an American rock band
  - House of Lords (House of Lords album), 1988
- "House of Lords", or Thomas Dartnall, bass player for British band Young Knives
- House of Lords, official whisky of the British House of Lords, distilled by Edradour in Scotland
- House of Lords gin, made by Booth's
- House of Lords, the former highest court in the United Kingdom, until superseded by the Supreme Court.

== See also ==
- Chamber of Peers (disambiguation)
- House (disambiguation)
- Lord House (disambiguation)
- Lords (disambiguation)
- The House of the Lord, a 1912 book by James E. Talmage
