= Peer of the realm =

Member of the highest aristocratic social order outside the ruling dynasty

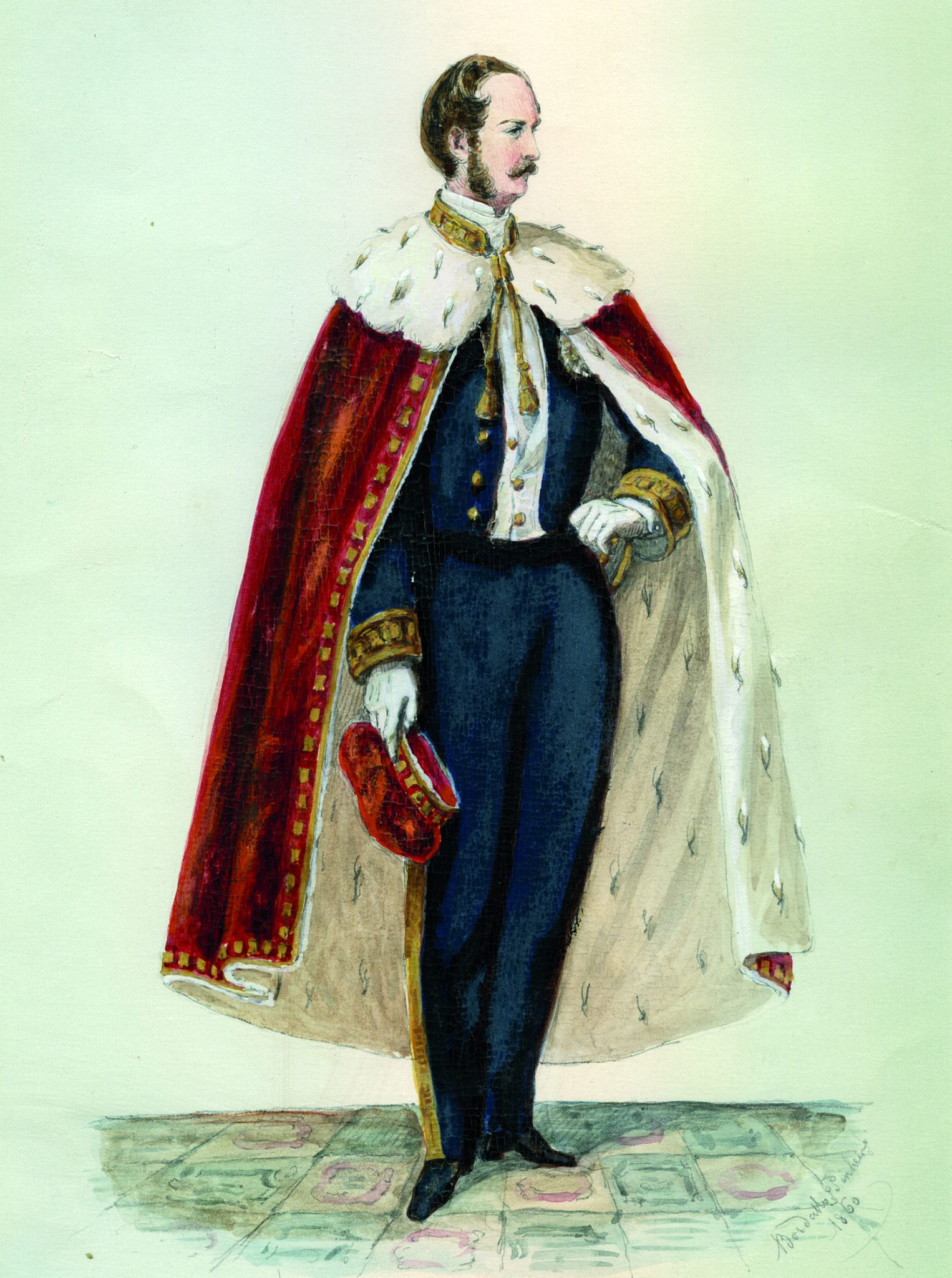
The uniform of a Portuguese Peer of the Realm while serving in the Chamber of Most Worthy Peers

A peer of the realm is a member of the highest aristocratic social order outside the ruling dynasty of the kingdom.

Notable examples are:

- a member of the peerages in the United Kingdom, who is a hereditary peer or a life peer
- a member of the Peerage of France (from French noble style "pair" in monarchies), of a similar order, as used in
  - the Kingdom of France
  - the Kingdom of Jerusalem (crusader state)
  - the Monarchy of Canada: Canadian nobility in the Peerage of France
- nobility proper of the Polish–Lithuanian Commonwealth who enjoyed hereditary paritas: those who would sit by hereditary right in Land Parliaments, or be Royal Electors, enjoy personal immunity, and the right to be judged only by the King's Court or the Court of Peers; also the exclusive right to be granted State or Land dignities and titles. The Skartabelli who were middle-nobility in law were not peers, whilst noblemen who were not direct barons of the Crown but held land from other Lords were not peers de facto as they would not enjoy full noble privileges.
- a member of the Portuguese Chamber of Most Worthy Peers, upper house of the Cortes Gerais, during the constitutional monarchy of the Kingdom of Portugal.

== See also ==
- Chamber of Peers (disambiguation)
- House of Lords (disambiguation)
