= Lourde =

Lourde may refer to:

- Lourde, Haute-Garonne, a commune in the Haute Garonne department, France
- Lourde (river), a river in the Dordogne department, France

== See also ==
- Lord (disambiguation)
- Lorde (disambiguation)
- Lourd
- Lourdes (disambiguation)
- Lords (disambiguation)
