= Company F State Armory =

- U.S. National Register of Historic Places
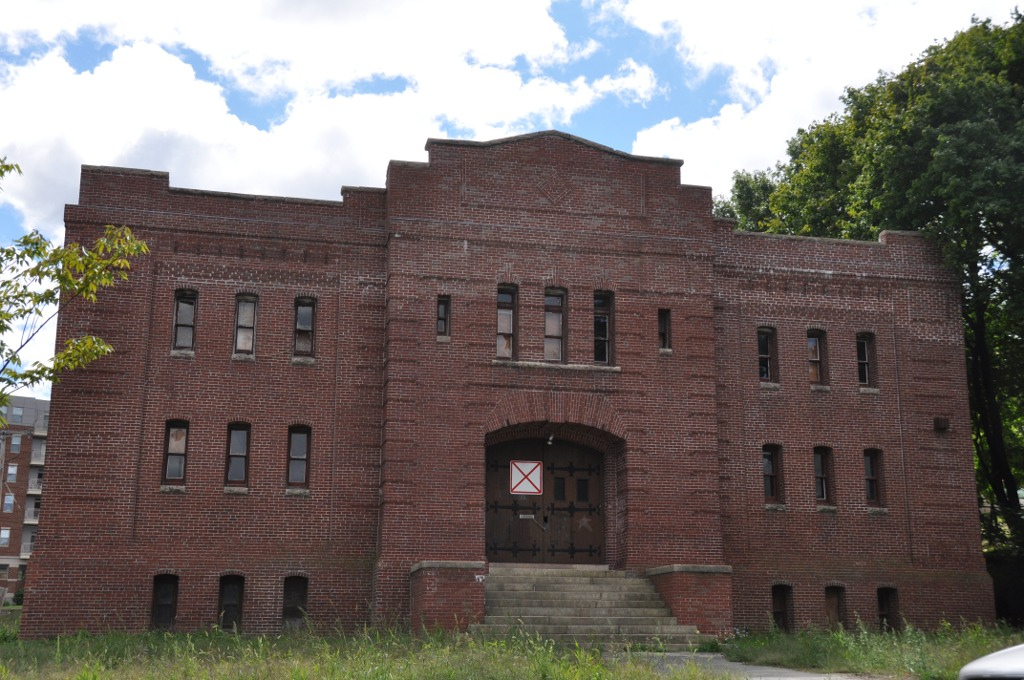

- Location within Massachusetts Location within the United States
- Location: Curtis and Sharon Sts., Waltham, Massachusetts
- Coordinates: 42°22′10″N 71°14′53″W
- Area: less than one acre
- Built: 1908
- Architect: Hartwell, Richardson & Driver
- MPS: Waltham MRA
- NRHP reference No.: 89001571
- Added to NRHP: September 28, 1989

The Company F State Armory, also known as the Waltham State Armory, is a historic armory building at Curtis and Sharon Streets in Waltham, Massachusetts. Built in 1908, it is locally notable for its Georgian Revival architecture, and as the city's only armory building. It was among the last of the state's armories to be built to individualized architectural design. The building was listed on the National Register of Historic Places in 1989. The building is vacant.

== Description and history ==
The Waltham State Armory is located on Waltham's west side, at the southwest corner of Curtis and Sharon Streets. Its main block is two stories with a full basement, and there is a rear extension of a single story, also with a basement. The main facade has a central projecting entry pavilion, with a recessed entryway set in a segmented archway. Narrow vertical windows are placed symmetrically on the facade, and a parapet rises above the roofline. The building's corners have brick quoining. The interior had a firing range in the basement, an assembly room and drill hall on the main floor, and offices and a library on the second floor.

The building was built in 1908 to a design by Hartwell, Richardson & Driver, architects whose commissions included several of the city's prominent buildings. In addition to the high quality of its materials and workmanship, it is the last of the state's armories to be built with individualized architectural design. It was built by Rufus Lord, owner and builder of Lord's Castle, for $45,000.

== See also ==
- National Register of Historic Places listings in Waltham, Massachusetts
