= Kennebunkport Historic District =

Historic district in Maine, United States

- U.S. National Register of Historic Places
- U.S. Historic district
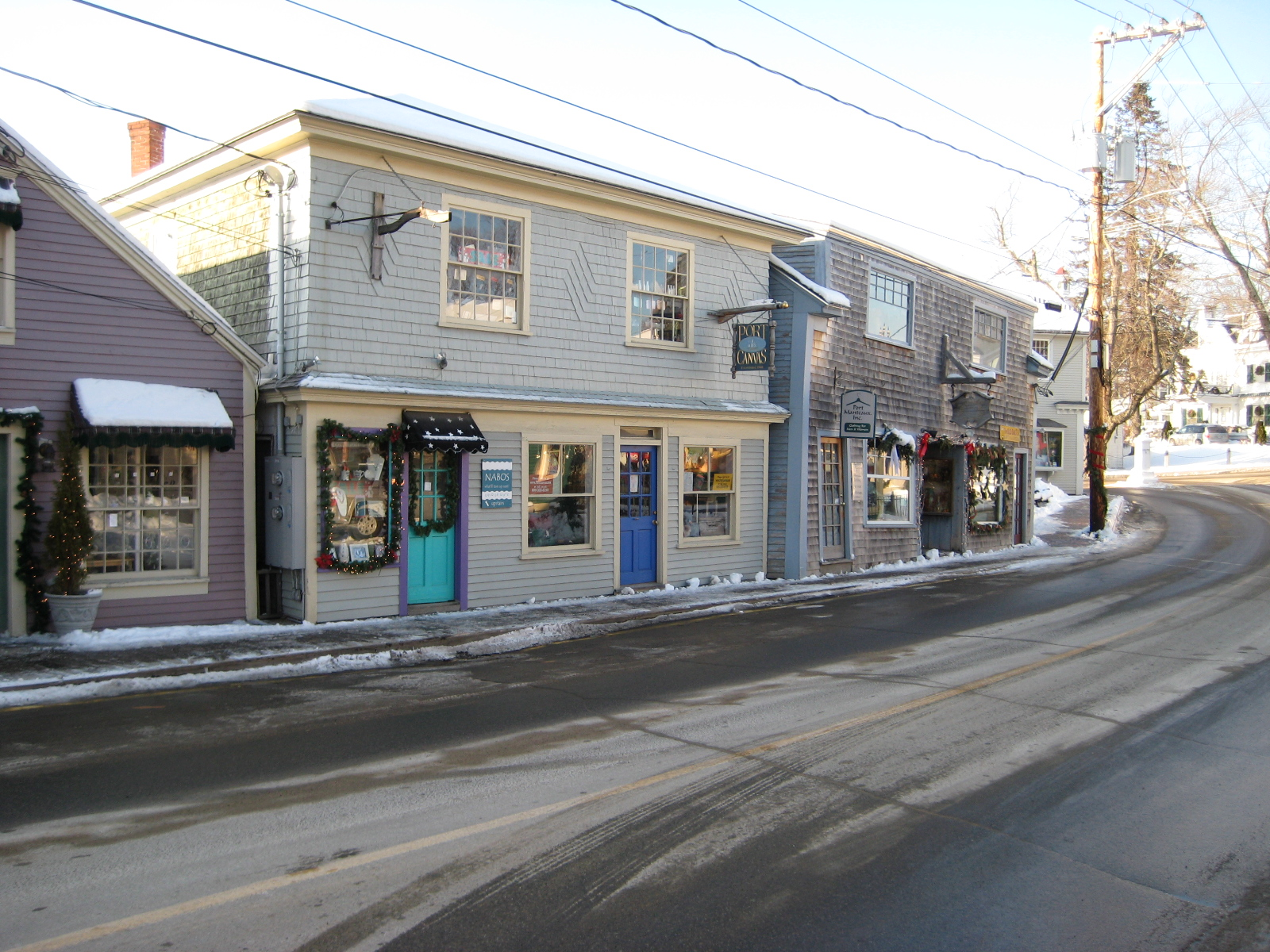

- Location within Maine Location within the United States
- Location: Bounded roughly by South, Maine, North, and Lock Streets, and the Kennebunkport River, Kennebunkport, Maine
- Coordinates: 43°21′46″N 70°28′33″W
- Area: 95 acres (38 ha)
- Architect: Davis, Samuel; Multiple
- Architectural style: Colonial, Federal, Greek Revival
- NRHP reference No.: 76000121
- Added to NRHP: May 6, 1976

The Kennebunkport Historic District encompasses most of the village center of Kennebunkport, Maine. It includes the town's highest concentration of historic architecture, with many buildings from the late 18th and early 19th century, when Kennebunkport was at its height as a shipping and shipbuilding center. The district was added to the National Register of Historic Places on May 6, 1976.

== Description and history ==
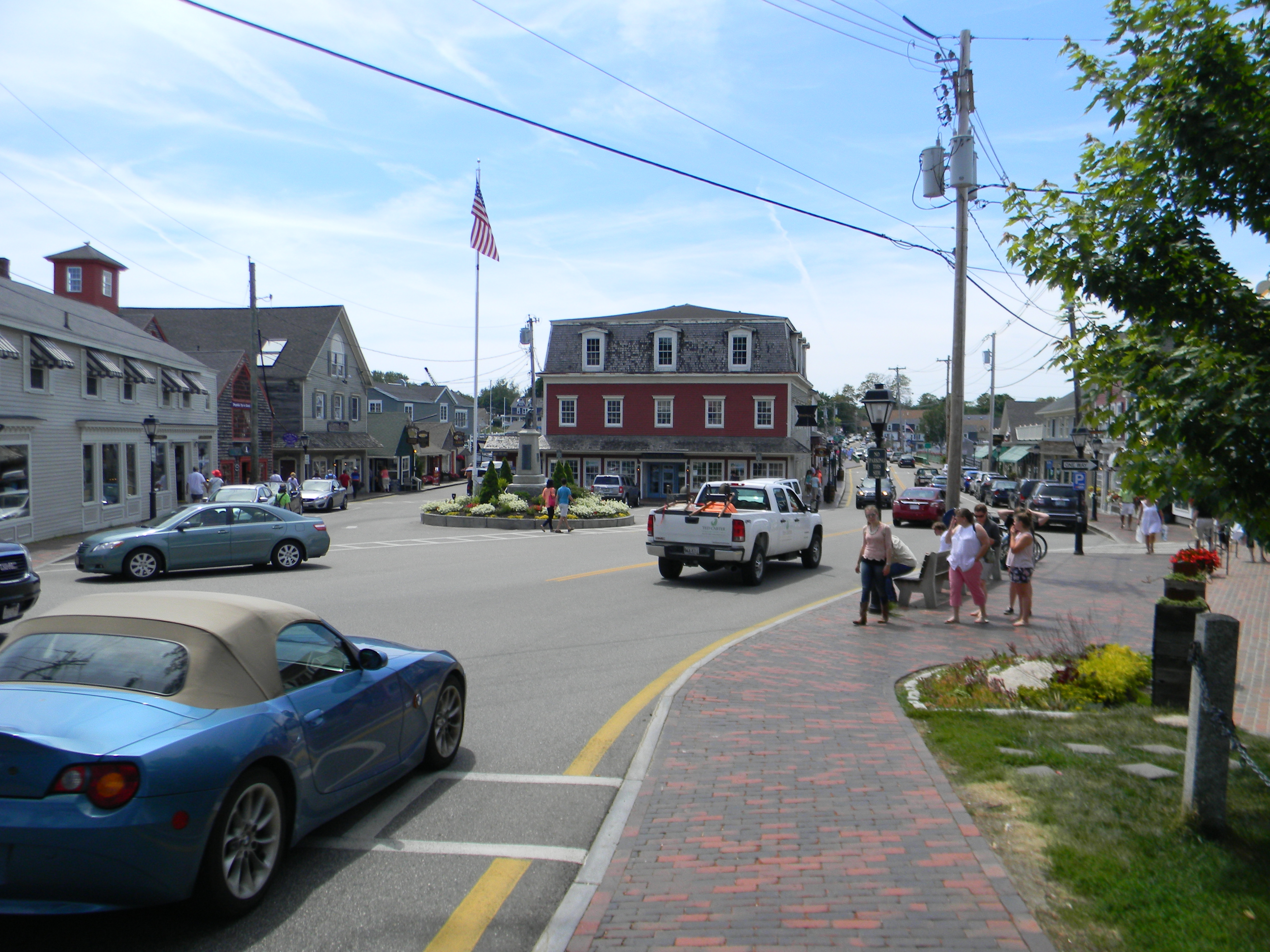
Dock Square, 2015

The town of Kennebunkport lies on the coast of southern Maine, between the Kennebunk River and the Little River. Its main village is located in the southwestern part of the town, on the north bank of the tidal Kennebunk River, inland from the coast. This area was first incorporated as Cape Porpoise in 1653, was abandoned during the wars of the late 17th and early 18th centuries, and was resettled in 1719. It was incorporated as Kennebunkport in 1820. The town's early economic success as a shipbuilding and shipping center, which was eventually supplanted by its development beginning in the 1870s as a summer resort area, which was centered in the Cape Arundel area.

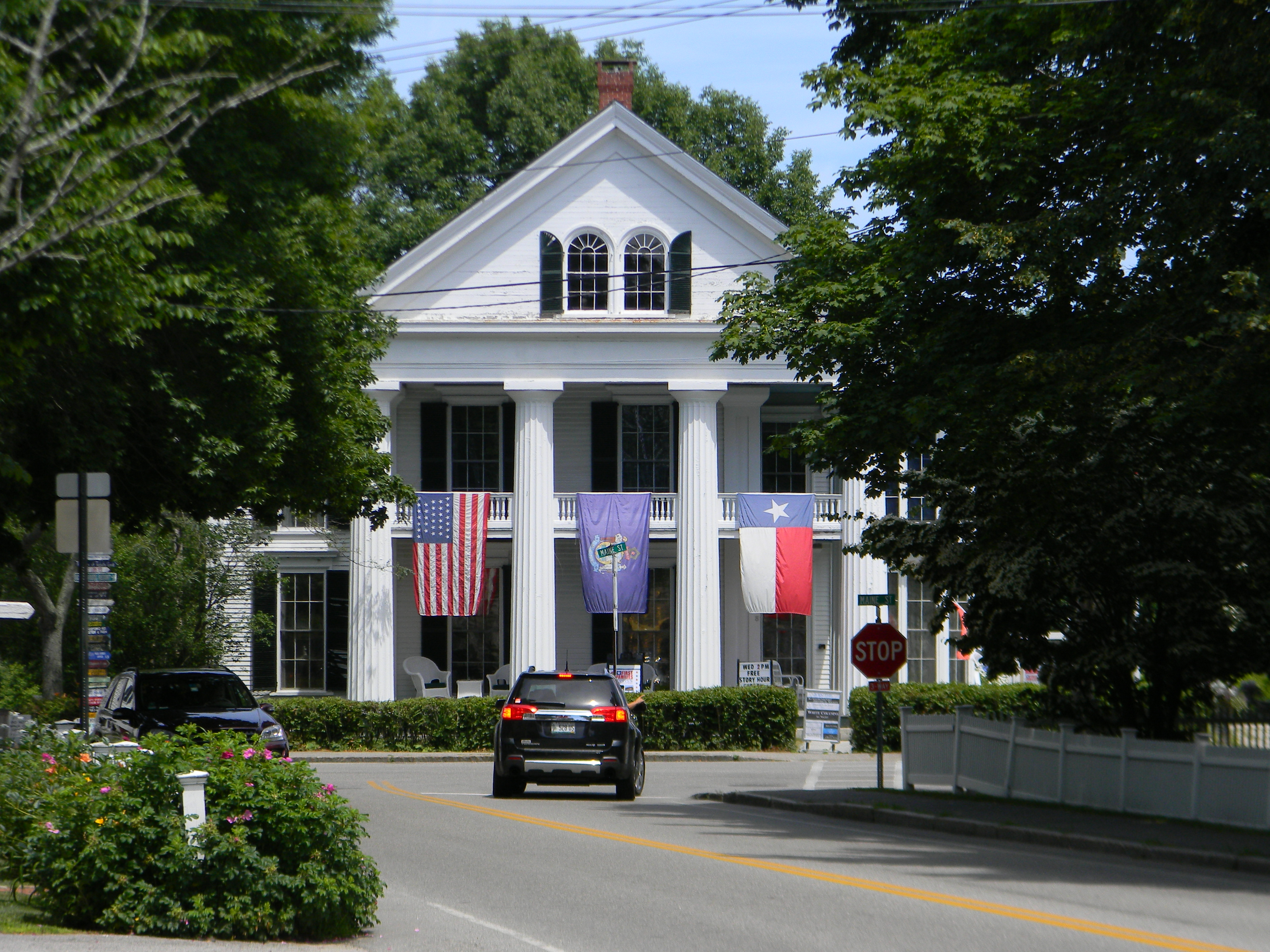
White Columns, 2015

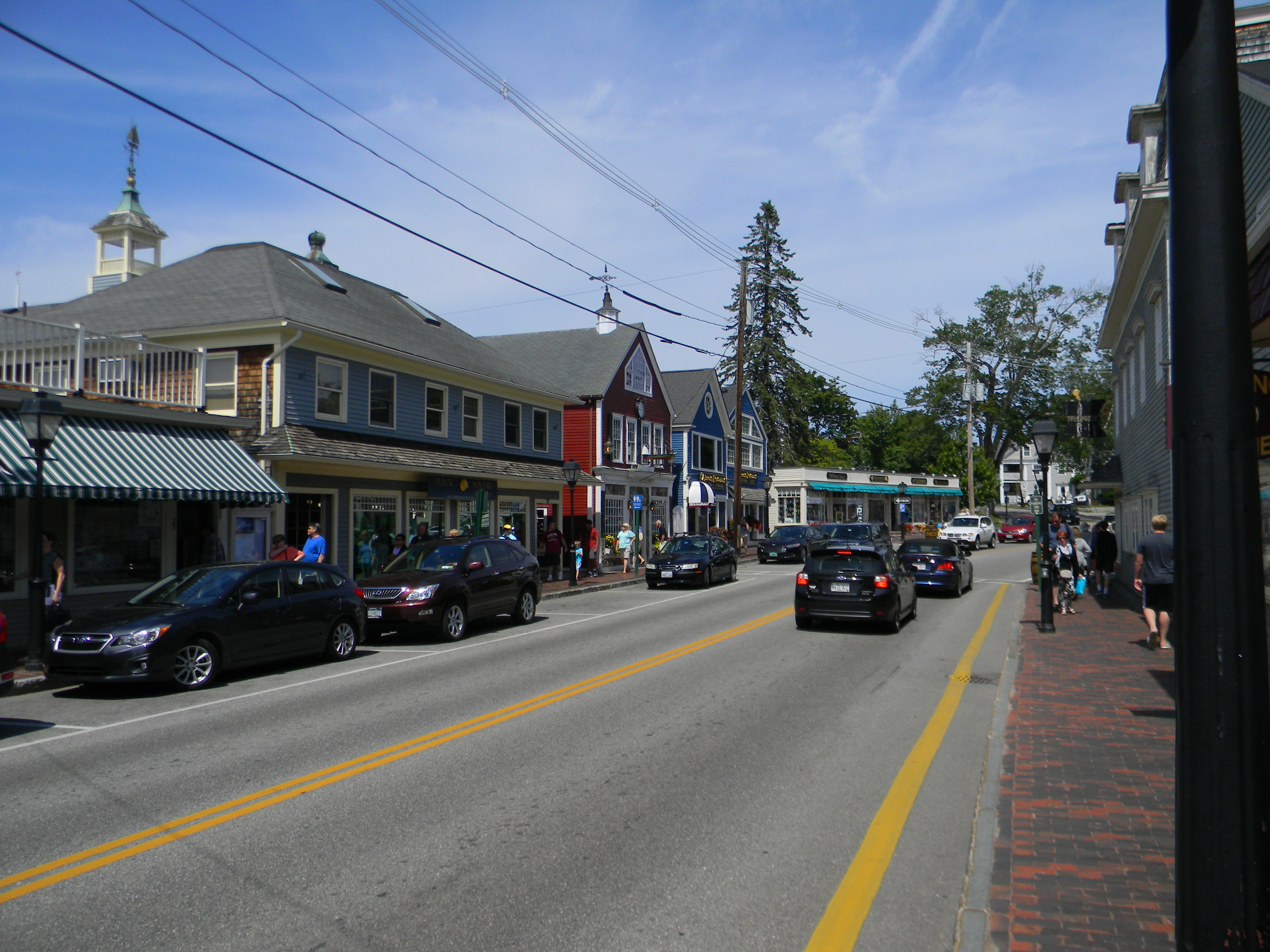
Western Avenue, 2015

The major roads in Kennebunkport village are Western Avenue, which runs southwest to cross the river into Kennebunk, North Street, which runs inland, and Ocean and Maine Streets, which run parallel to the river, southward toward Cape Arundel. The district extends along these roads, and includes numerous properties on the side streets which connect them. It has 147 buildings, of which only 24 were built after 1925. Most of these later structures (for example, the 1960 town offices) are in sympathetic styles. Residential properties in the district are typically high-quality vernacular interpretations of architectural styles popular at the time of their construction. A few houses date to the colonial period, including the 1745 Gideon Walker House on South Street, which was altered to plans by John Calvin Stevens in 1910. The largest number of buildings in the district are from the Federal period, when Kennebunkport was at its economic height. One of the finest houses from this period is the Capt. Nathaniel Lord Mansion, separately listed on the National Register in 1973.

== Notable contributing properties ==
- Melville Walker House

== See also ==
- National Register of Historic Places listings in York County, Maine
