= Listed buildings in Wilberfoss =

Wilberfoss is a civil parish in the county of the East Riding of Yorkshire, England. It contains six listed buildings that are recorded in the National Heritage List for England. Of these, one is listed at Grade I, the highest of the three grades, one is at Grade II*, the middle grade, and the others are at Grade II, the lowest grade. The parish contains the village of Wilberfoss and the surrounding area. All the listed buildings are in the village, and consist of houses, a church and a bridge.

== Key ==
Grade	Criteria
I	Buildings of exceptional interest, sometimes considered to be internationally important
II*	Particularly important buildings of more than special interest
II	Buildings of national importance and special interest

== Buildings ==
Name and location	Photograph	Date	Notes	Grade
St John the Baptist's Church; 53.94991°N 0.88508°W		12th century	The church has been altered and extended through the centuries, including a restoration in 1868–69. It is built in stone with a slate roof, and consists of a nave, a south aisle, a south porch, a chancel with a north vestry, and a west tower. The tower has three stages, a moulded plinth, diagonal buttresses, quoins, a projecting southeast stair turret with slit windows, a square-headed window on the middle stage, two-light pointed bell openings with Y-tracery, and an embattled parapet with crocketed corner finials.	I
Church Bridge; 53.94983°N 0.88610°W		16th century (possible)	The footbridge crossing Foss Beck is in stone with repairs in red brick. It consists of a single chamfered pointed arch under a ramped bridge deck, and has a 20th-century timber balustrade and rail.	II*
Dunoon; 53.94858°N 0.89032°W	—	Early to mid-18th century	The house is in brown brick, with a stepped brick eaves cornice, and a pantile roof with tumbled-in brick to the raised gables. There are two storeys and three bays, and a rear extension. In the centre is a dentilld doorcase with pilasters, and a doorway with a fanlight. The windows are casements under flat arches.	II
The Old Vicarage; 53.94874°N 0.88984°W	—	Late 18th century	The house is in brown brick, with a dentilled timber eaves cornice, and a slate roof with raised coped gables on shaped kneelers. There are two storeys and attics, and three bays. In the centre is a projecting flat-roofed porch containing a doorway under a cambered wedge lintel, round-headed side windows, a fascia and a cornice. The other windows are sashes under cambered wedge lintels.	II
House to the east of The Old Vicarage; 53.94871°N 0.88942°W	—	Late 18th century	The house is in orange brick with a pantile roof. There are two storeys and three bays, and a rear wing. The central doorway has a fanlight, the windows are sashes, and all the openings are under segmental brick arches.	II
7 Main Street; 53.94844°N 0.88768°W	—	Late 18th to early 19th century	The house is in brown brick, and has a pantile roof with raised coped gables on shaped kneelers. There are two storeys and three bays. The central doorway has fluted pilasters, panelled reveals and a soffit, and a cornice on consoles. This is flanked by square bay windows with casements, and the upper floor contains two-light windows under cambered channelled wedge lintels with projecting keystones.	II
