= Melville Walker House =

Historic house in Maine, United States

- U.S. Historic district – Contributing property
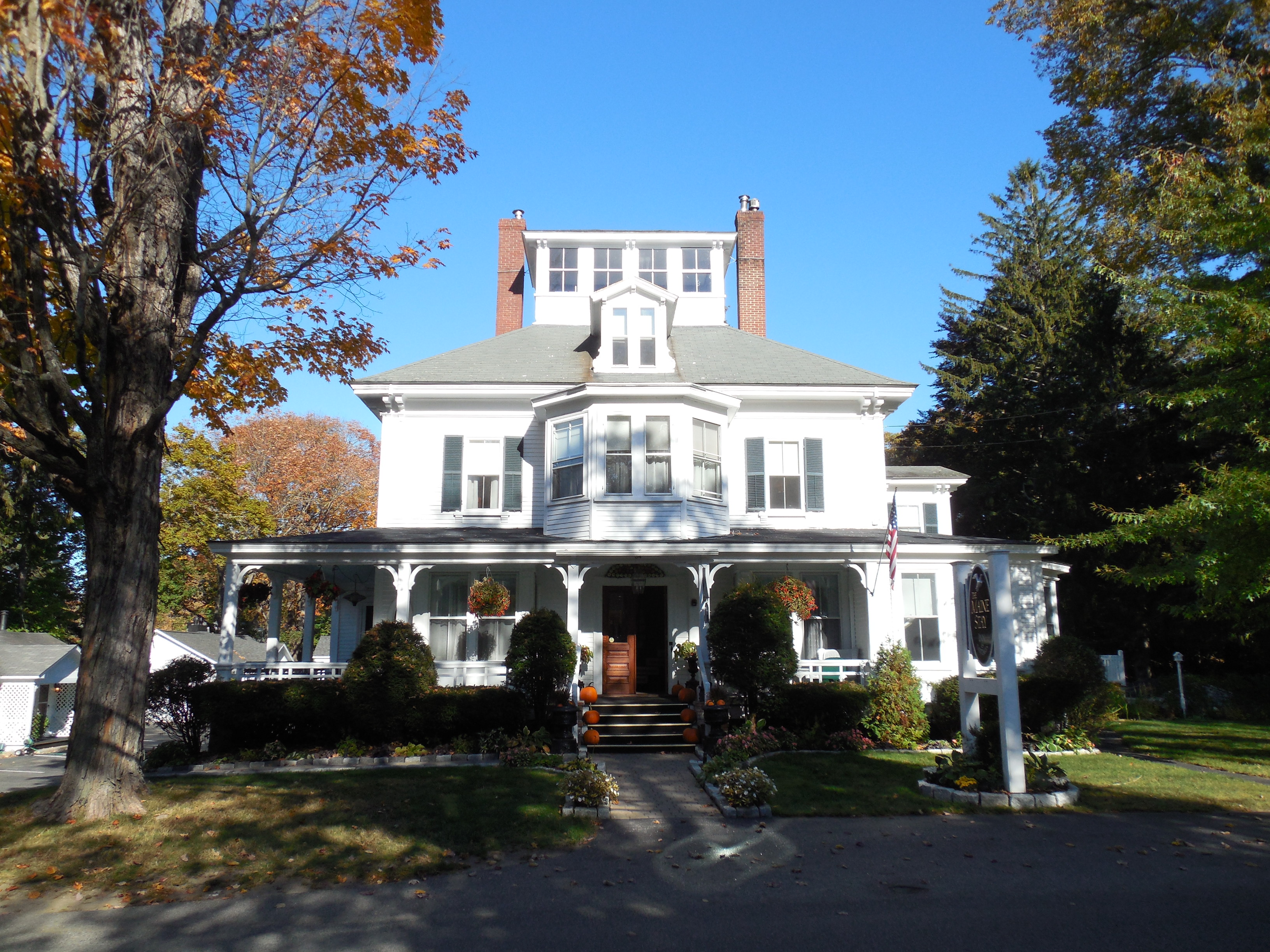
- AWOL Kennebunkport

- Location within Maine
- Location: 34 Maine Street Kennebunkport, Maine
- Coordinates: 43°21′35.7582″N 70°28′22.965″W
- Built: c. 1860
- Architect: Melville Walker
- Architectural style: Italianate architecture
- Part of: Kennebunkport Historic District (ID76000121)
- Designated CP: May 6, 1976

The Melville Walker House is an inn on Maine Street in the Kennebunkport Historic District in Kennebunkport, Maine. The inn was added to the National Register of Historic Places as part of the Kennebunkport Historic District on May 6, 1976. It is now known as AWOL Kennebunkport.

== History ==
The Melville Walker House was built in 1860 as a private residence by merchant sea captain Melville Walker on land given to him by his father, William H. Walker. After his marriage, Captain Walker transferred the title to his wife, Abbie.

The property then passed to brother-in-law, Hiram Fairfield on October 4, 1876, who in turn left it to his wife, Adelaide (Melville's sister), and their son Harry. 31 years later in 1891, the property passed from the founding family for the first time when Adelaide sold it to the Heuvelman family. The Heuvelmans held the property until 1899, at which time they sold it to George Little, an executive with the New York, New Haven & Hartford Railroad. The Society's records show that electric lights were installed in 1905 at the Little's on Maine Street, then known as “The Maples.”

Title to the house and property then passed to Senator Wickes of New York in 1924. The next owners, the Eldridge family, gave the property its name before AWOL as “The Maine Stay” and opened their guest house. The first cottage was added to the property in 1954. The inn remained under the Eldridge ownership until 1970 when it was sold to the Taylor-Milligan family. They sold The Maine Stay to Max and Jane Andrews in 1976. Jacques and Carol Gagnon purchased the house in 1983 and turned it into a bed and breakfast. In April 1989, the title passed to Carol and Lindsay Copeland who sold it to George and Janice Yankowski in 2002. On April 30, 2008, Janice and George sold the inn to Judi and Walter Hauer.

== Design ==
The design of the main house is considered to be square-block Italianate architecture, contoured in a low-hip roof design, with additions and renovations added over the years. In the early 1900s, Queen Anne style architecture was introduced to the inn with the construction of the suspended spiral partially flying staircase, starburst crystal glass windows, ornately carved mantels and moldings, and additions of bay windows and the wrap-around porch.
