= Elizabeth Lorde =

English prioress

- Died: 1551
- Occupations: nun and prioress
- Known for: surrendering Wilberfoss Priory to dissolution

Elizabeth Lorde ( – 1551) was an English prioress of Wilberfoss. During the Dissolution of the Monasteries she surrendered Wilberfoss Priory as required by law and accepted a pension.

== Life ==
Lorde's father was Richard Lorde of Kendal in the Lake District. Her siblings were Brian Lorde who was a successful merchant in Yorkshire and her sister married George Gale who was a goldsmith and who would in time by Mayor of York twice.

She is thought to have joined the Wilberfoss Priory when young and in October 1512 she became the prioress succeeding Margaret Easingwold. Her age is unknown but she is presumed to have been young.

In 1536 the priory was visited by the commissioner of Cromwell to determine whether it should be closed as institutions which had too low an income were to be closed. Wilberfoss's annual income was £22 which was much too low, but the priory was given a stay of execution of three years.

She surrendered the convent on 20 August 1539 and it was dissolved and granted to George Gale c. 1543. At the time of the dissolution, it had a yearly value of £26. 10s. 8d. (£23,629.77 in 2017 money). Lorde was given a sizeable pension of eight pounds and her nine nuns were offered pensions but some were just a pound a year.

Lorde moved to live with her sister and brother in law Mary and George Gale in the area of York known as Goodramgate.

== Legacy ==
She died in 1551. Two years later some of her nuns were still receiving pensions. Records show Agnes Burton, 33s 4d.; Alice Thornton, 20s; and then Alice Metcalfe, Joanna Andrew, Beatrice Hargall, Isabella Creake and Margaret Brown were all receiving 26s 8d. The current parish church of Wilberfoss, St John's, is possibly the nave of the conventual church. In 1967 the church was designated a Grade I listed building.
