= Wilberfoss Priory =

Priory in the East Yorkshire, England

Coordinates: 53.940974°N 0.889410°W

Wilberfoss Priory was a priory in the East Riding of Yorkshire, England.

A house of Benedictine nuns was founded before 1153 by Alan de Cotton, who granted land and property, and Jordan fitz Gilbert, who granted the church and some land which was confirmed by Henry Murdac, Archbishop of York. The house had only little income which in 1397 was not even sufficient for the sustenance of the nuns.

The convent was surrendered by the prioress Elizabeth Lorde on 20 August 1539 and it was dissolved and granted to her brother in law George Gale c. 1543. At the time of the dissolution, it had a yearly value of £26. 10s. 8d. (£23,629.77 in 2017 money). The current parish church of Wilberfoss, St John's, is possibly the nave of the conventual church. In 1967 the church was designated a Grade I listed building.
