= Chamber of Peers =

The Chamber of Peers or House of Peers refers to the legislative upper house in several countries with a peerage:

- Chamber of Peers (France) from 1814 to 1848
- House of Peers (Japan) from 1889 to 1947
- Chamber of Most Worthy Peers (Portugal) from 1826–1838 and again from 1842–1910
- Chamber of Peers (Spain) (Estamento de Próceres), from 1834 to 1836
- United Kingdom :
  - The British House of Lords is known as the "House of Peers" for ceremonial purposes
  - The pre-1801 Irish House of Lords
  - Cromwell's Other House or House of Peers (1658–1659) during the final years of the Protectorate
  - Reform of the House of Lords

== See also ==
- House of Lords (disambiguation)
- Chamber of Princes
- Peer of the realm
- Peerage
