= The Holy Temple =

1980 book by Boyd K. Packer

- Cover of the initial 1980 printing
- Author: Boyd K. Packer
- Language: English
- Publisher: Bookcraft
- Publication date: 1980
- Publication place: United States
- Pages: 274

The Holy Temple is a 1980 book by Boyd K. Packer that discusses the doctrine and purpose of the temples of the Church of Jesus Christ of Latter-day Saints (LDS Church), including an explanation of the entrance requirements. The book also explains why LDS Church teachings focus on family history and genealogy and how this relates to the temples.

The Holy Temple was published by Bookcraft. Since its publication, excerpts have regularly appeared in official magazines of the LDS Church. In 2002, the LDS Church issued an official publication that was adapted from Packer's book: the 37-page booklet Preparing to Enter the Holy Temple is given to members of the church who are preparing to attend the temple for the first time.

In 2007, Deseret Book published a 320-page illustrated version of the book.

== See also ==
- The House of the Lord
