= Lourdes (given name) =

Lourdes, María Lourdes and María de Lourdes are given names.

Notable people bearing these names include:

- Lourdes Alberto, Curaçaoan politician
- Lourdes Alcorta (born 1951), a Peruvian politician
- Lourdes Becerra (born 1973), a Spanish swimmer and politician
- Lourdes Benedicto (born 1974), an American actress
- María Lourdes Carlé (born 2000), Argentine tennis player
- Lourdes Castrillo Brillantes, a Filipino writer
- Lourdes Maria Ciccone Leon, daughter of entertainer Madonna
- María de Lourdes Dieck-Assad, a Mexican economist
- Lourdes Domínguez Lino, a Spanish tennis player
- Lourdes Estores, an American glamour model
- Lourdes Cecilia Fernández (born 1981), Argentine musician
- Lourdes Flores, a Peruvian politician
- Lourdes Garcia-Navarro, an American journalist
- Lourdes Gourriel, Cuban baseball player and Olympic gold medalist
- Lourdes Gurriel Jr., a Major League baseball player
- Lourdes Hartkopf (born 1996), Argentine sailor
- Lourdes Hernández, a Spanish singer-songwriter known professionally as Russian Red
- Lourdes Lucero, a fictional character from DC Comics
- Lourdes Maldonado (born 1973), Spanish journalist
- Lourdes Mendoza, a Peruvian politician
- Maria de Lurdes Mutola, an athlete from Mozambique
- Lourdes de Oliveira, Brazilian actress
- Lourdes Pangelinan (born 1974), director-general of the Secretariat of the Pacific Community
- Lourdes Pérez, a Puerto Rican recording artist
- Lourdes Pérez Iturraspe (born 2000), Argentine field hockey player
- Lourdes Valera, Venezuelan actress
- Maria de Lourdes Pintasilgo, a former prime minister of Portugal
- Lourdes Virginia Moran Poe (Lovi Poe), a Filipino actress
- Lourdes Portillo, a Mexican-American film director
- María de Lourdes Rojo e Incháustegui, a Mexican actress and politician
- Lourdes Sánchez (born 1986), Argentine dancer
- María de Lourdes Santiago, a Puerto Rican politician
- Maria de Lourdes Pereira dos Santos Van-Dúnem (Lourdes Van-Dúnem), an Angolan singer
- Maria de Lourdes Villiers-Farrow (Mia Farrow), an American actress
- Maria Lourdes Sereno, Current Chief Justice of the Philippines and the first woman to hold the position

== Fictional characters ==
- Lourdes Chantel, a mutant character in Marvel Comics
- Lourdes Delgado was a main character and medical assistant in the television series Falling Skies played by Seychelle Gabriel.
- Lourdes Lucero (La Encantadora), an adversary of Superman in DC Comics
- Lourdes, a doll in the Groovy Girls doll line by Manhattan Toy

== See also ==
- Lourdes (disambiguation)
