= Holy of Holies (LDS Church) =

Room in the LDS Salt Lake Temple

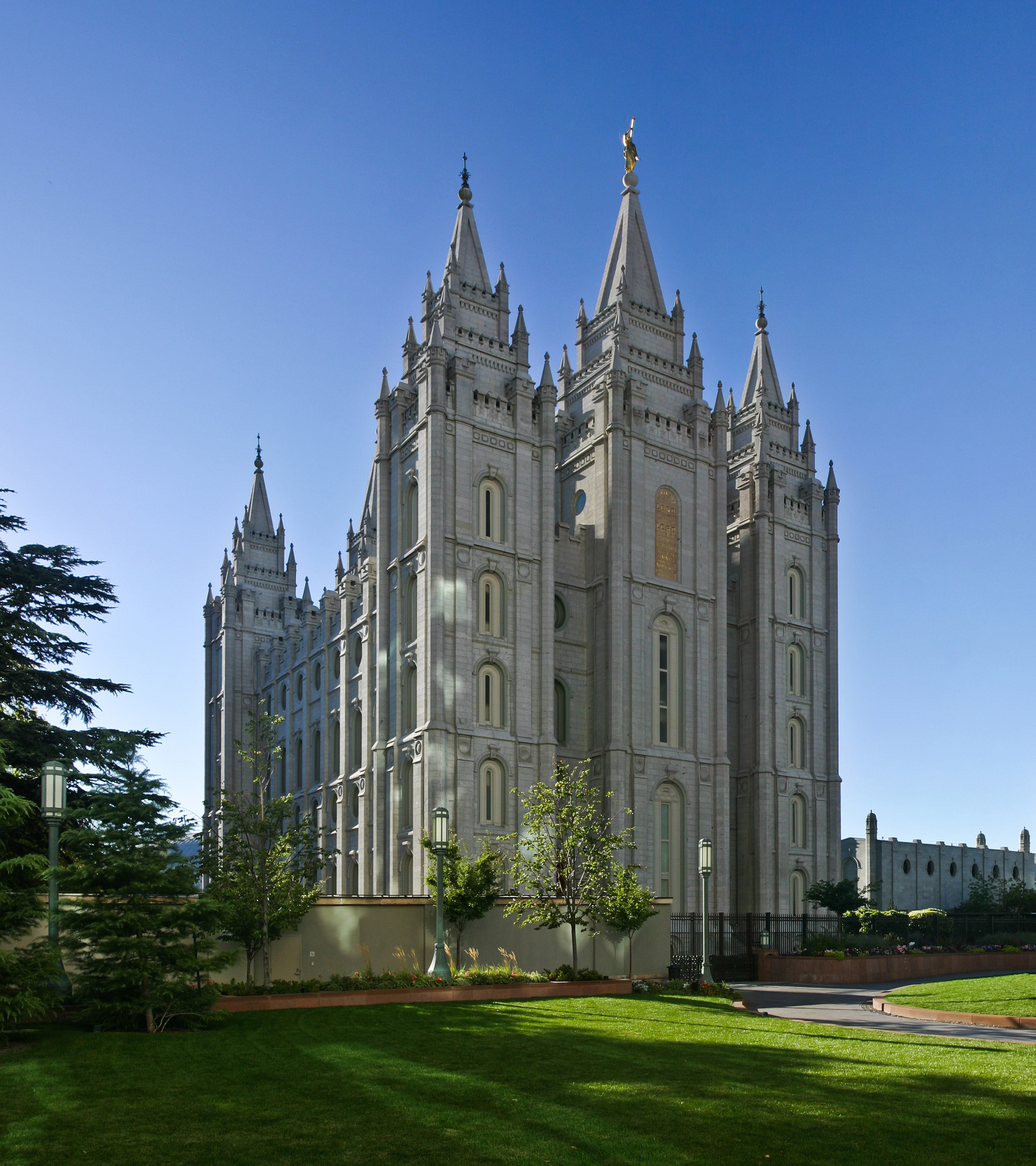
The Salt Lake Temple contains a Holy of Holies.

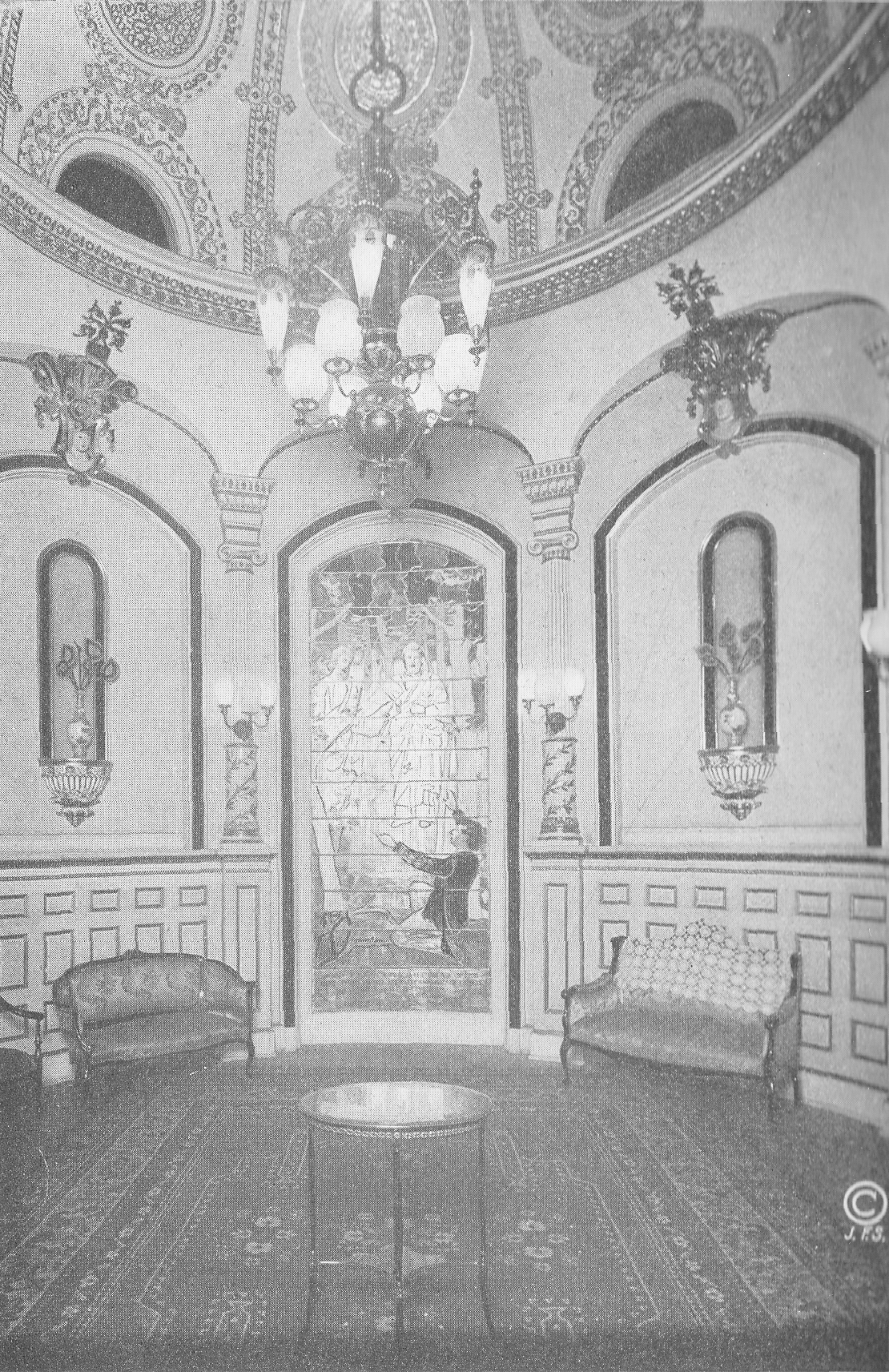
Holy of Holies in the Salt Lake Temple, as it appeared in the early 1900s

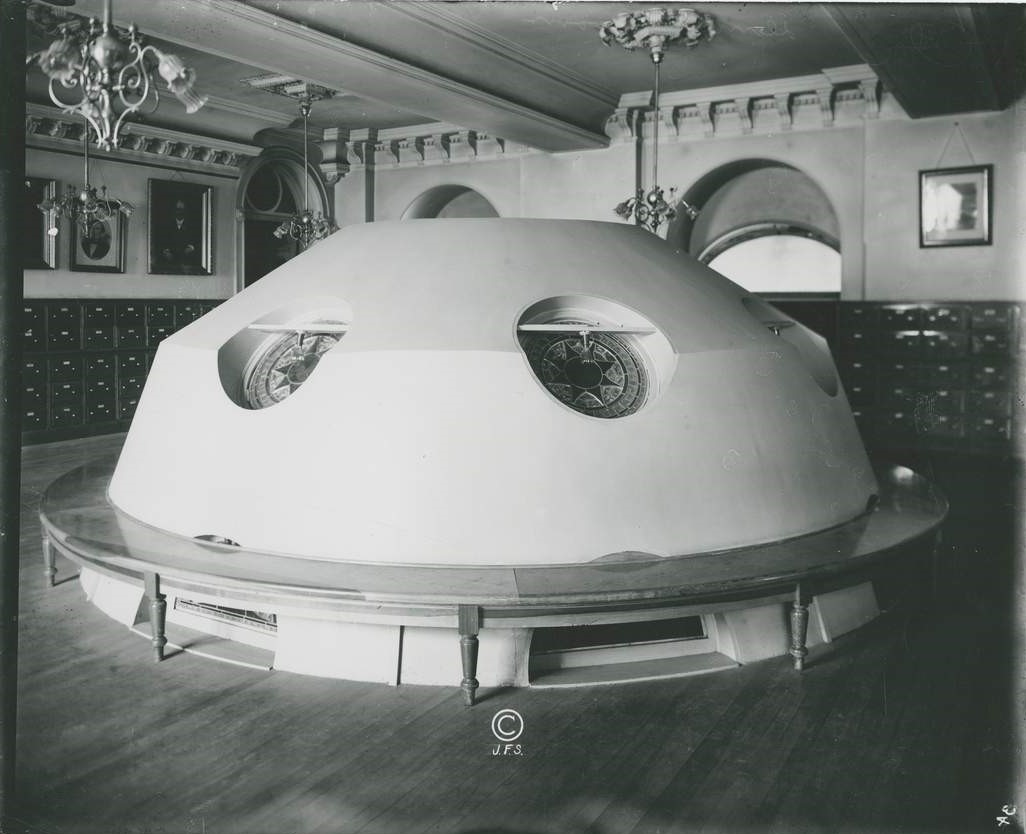
The domed ceiling of the Holy of Holies seen from above

The Holy of Holies or Holiest of Holies is a room in the Salt Lake Temple of the Church of Jesus Christ of Latter-day Saints (LDS Church), wherein the church president, as the Presiding High Priest of the Church, enters to act as High Priest of Israel in direct relationship with God, in accordance with the church's interpretation of the Book of Exodus. Hence, this Holy of Holies in the temple is considered by adherents to be a modern cognate to the inner sanctuary of the Tabernacle and Temple in Jerusalem. The room was also the place where the second anointing ordinance was administered, although now any room in a temple set apart for this purpose is used.

== Location and description ==
The Holy of Holies is a room adjoining the celestial room of the Salt Lake Temple. The room is described in the Encyclopedia of Mormonism: "Beyond its sliding doors are six steps to similar doors, symbolic of the veil that guarded the Holy of Holies in ancient times. The sanctuary is of circular design with a domed ceiling. The appointments include inlaid wood, gold leaf, stained glass, and unique lighting." The room includes a twelve-foot stained glass window, designed by the Tiffany Glass and Decorating Company, depicting the First Vision of Joseph Smith. Rooms of a similar nature to the one in Salt Lake were also constructed in the Nauvoo, St. George, Logan, and Manti temples. Modern temples typically use the largest sealing room as the Holy of Holies when required.

The first images of the Salt Lake Holy of Holies were published in The House of the Lord by James E. Talmage, of the Quorum of the Twelve Apostles. An additional image of the Holy of Holies was published during the 2019-2027 renovation of the Salt Lake Temple by the First Presidency, who were touring the nearly finished interior.

== Teachings by LDS Church leaders ==
Boyd K. Packer, of the Quorum of the Twelve Apostles (LDS Church), stated that "hidden away in the central part of the temple is the Holy of Holies, where the President of the Church may retire when burdened down with heavy decisions to seek an interview with Him whose Church it is. The prophet holds the keys, the spiritual keys and the very literal key to this one door in that sacred edifice".

Apostle James E. Talmage stated that "this room is reserved for the higher ordinances in the Priesthood relating to the exaltation of both living and dead".

Joseph Smith, founder of the Latter Day Saint movement, stated that "no one can truly say he knows God until he has handled something, and this can only be done in the Holiest of Holies".

== Cognate of the "most holy place" ==
Although not a general rule, in certain contexts outside of the LDS Church the term "Holy of Holies" may be synonymous with the "most holy place" referred to in the Book of Exodus. The construction "Holy of Holies" is a translation of a Hebrew idiom Qodesh haQodashim (קֹדֶשׁ הַקָּדָשִׁים), referring to the inner sanctuary of the Tabernacle or Temple in Jerusalem. In Biblical Hebrew, the Holy of Holies is distinguished from the phrase most holy by the definite article; i.e the room is the Qodesh haQodashim or "Holy of the Holies" and anything else described as most holy is Qodesh Qodashim, "Holy of Holies". In the King James Version of the Bible, this sanctuary is always referred to as the "most holy place"; this usage is followed in the LDS Church book of scripture known as the Doctrine and Covenants.

== In LDS Church scriptures ==
=== Speaking of the purposes of temples ===
"Therefore, verily I say unto you, that your anointings, and your washings, and your baptisms for the dead, and your solemn assemblies, and your memorials for your sacrifices by the sons of Levi, and for your oracles in your most holy places wherein you receive conversations, and your statutes and judgments, for the beginning of the revelations and foundation of Zion, and for the glory, honor, and endowment of all her municipals, are ordained by the ordinance of my holy house, which my people are always commanded to build unto my holy name."

=== First Presidency receives the oracles for the church ===
"I give unto [Joseph Smith] for counselors my servant Sidney Rigdon and my servant William Law, that these may constitute a quorum and First Presidency, to receive the oracles for the whole church".

== See also ==
- Adam-ondi-Ahman
- Kadosh Kadoshim
- Sacred Grove (Latter Day Saint movement)
- Sanctum sanctorum
