= Wilberfoss =

Village and civil parish in the East Riding of Yorkshire, England

Coordinates: 53.948917°N 0.888209°W

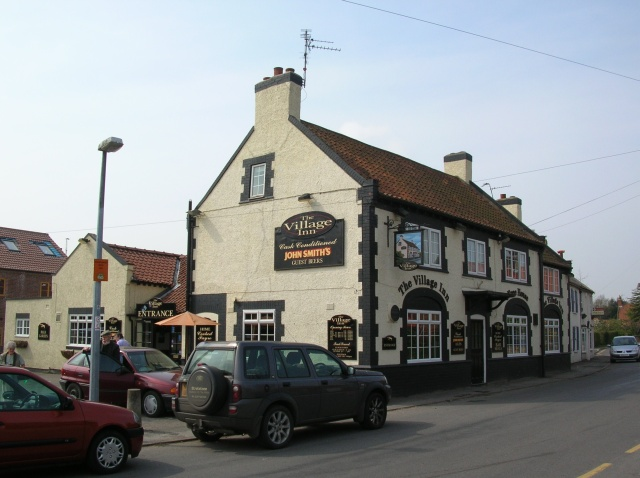
- The Village Inn

- Location within the East Riding of Yorkshire
- Population: 1,866 (2011 census)
- OS grid reference: SE730508
  - London: 170 mi (270 km) S
- Civil parish: Wilberfoss
- Unitary authority: East Riding of Yorkshire
- Ceremonial county: East Riding of Yorkshire
- Region: Yorkshire and the Humber
- Country: England
- Sovereign state: United Kingdom
- Post town: YORK
- Postcode district: YO41
- Dialling code: 01759
- Police: Humberside
- Fire: Humberside
- Ambulance: Yorkshire
- UK Parliament: Goole and Pocklington

Wilberfoss is a village and civil parish in the East Riding of Yorkshire, England. It is situated on the north side of the A1079 approximately 8 miles (13 km) east of York city centre and 11 miles (18 km) north-west of Market Weighton. According to the 2011 UK census, Wilberfoss parish had a population of 1,866, an increase on the 2001 UK census figure of 1,855.

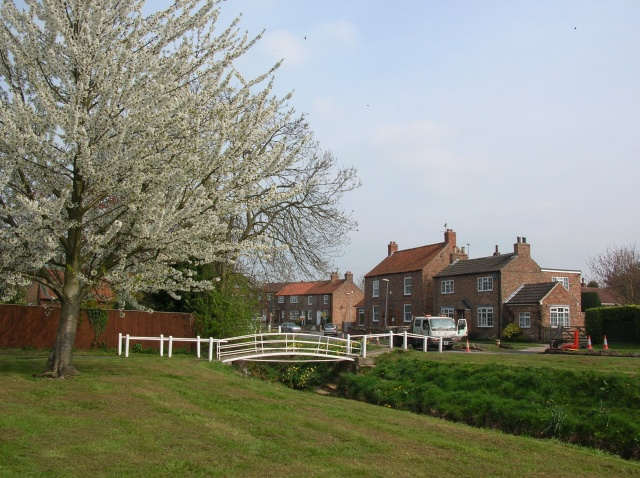
Village green and beck

The name Wilberfoss derives from the Old English Wilburhfoss meaning 'Wilburh's ditch'.

In 1823 inhabitants in the village numbered 335. Occupations included fifteen farmers – some of whom were land owners – three shopkeepers, two wheelwrights, two blacksmiths, a butcher, a bricklayer, a corn miller, a baker, a tailor, a wholesale brewer, and the landlords of the True Briton, Horse Shoes, and Waggon and Horses public houses. Also listed was one gentleman, a school teacher, and a perpetual curate. Baines' History, Directory & Gazetteer of the County of York states that the "ancient and respectable" family of Wilberfoss resided here from the Norman Conquest to 1710, after which the family estate and mansion was sold. A family descendant was William Wilberforce, and the Wilberforce family still provided patronage for the parish living. Wilberfoss Priory, a house of Benedictine nuns, was founded at Wilberfoss by Elias de Cotton during the reign of Henry II, which at the time of the suppression of the monasteries by Henry VIII had a yearly value of £26. 10s. 8d. The priory lay just to the north of St John's Church; nothing of it remains today.

In 1967 the parish Church of St John the Baptist was designated a Grade I listed building and is now recorded in the National Heritage List for England, maintained by Historic England. Other notable buildings include the Grade II listed Old Vicarage (circa late 18th century) on Main Street, mentioned in Pevsner's account of the village for its remarkable dentilled timber eaves cornice and raised curved gables on shapes kneelers and Villa Farm also of Main Street.

== See also ==
- Listed buildings in Wilberfoss

== Gallery ==
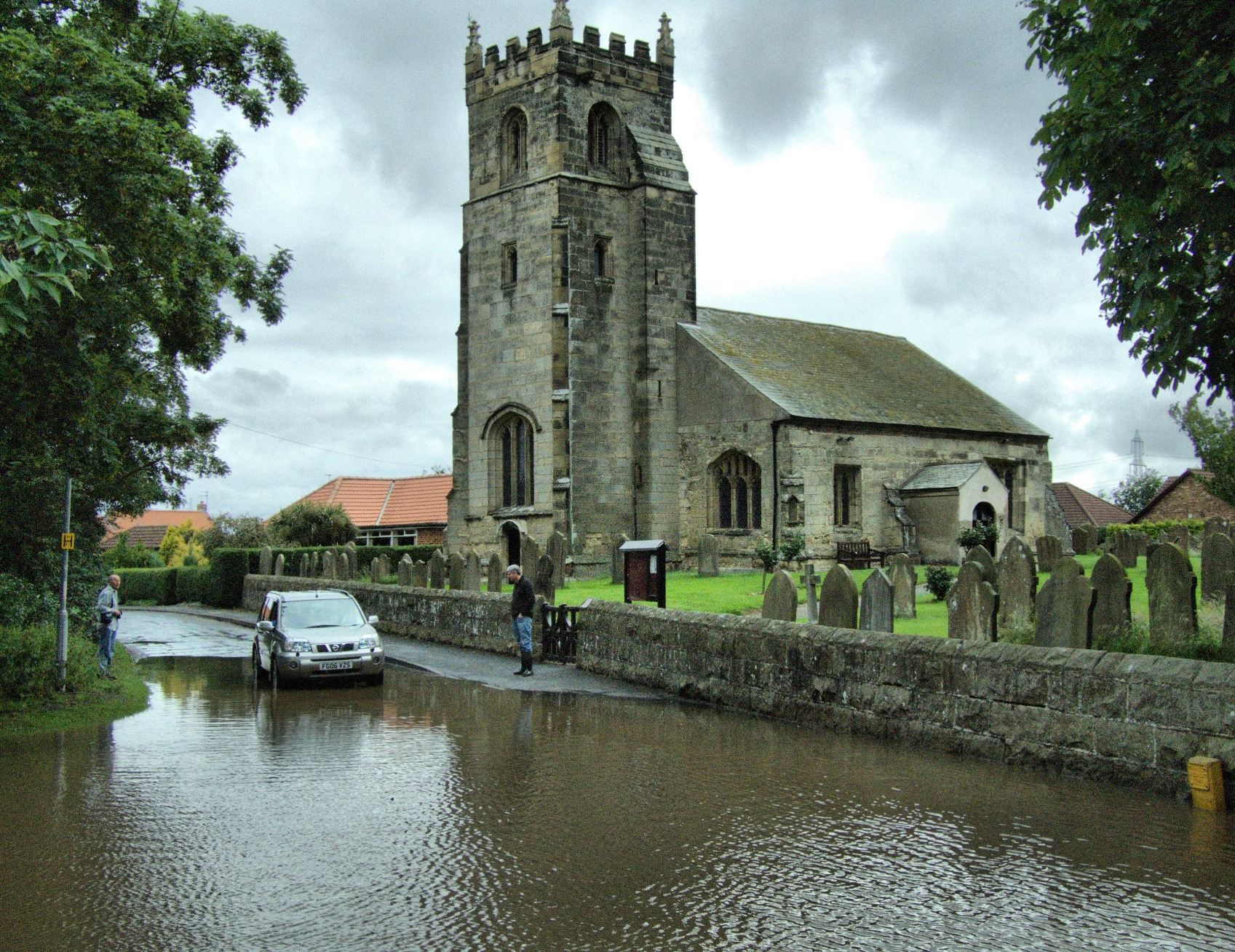
St John the Baptist Church

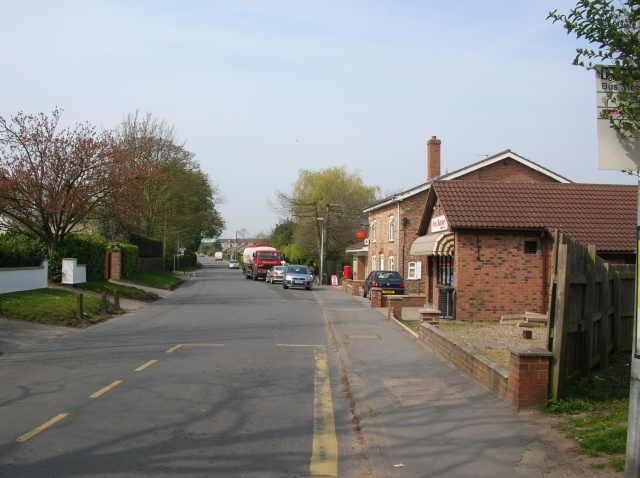
Shops on Main Street

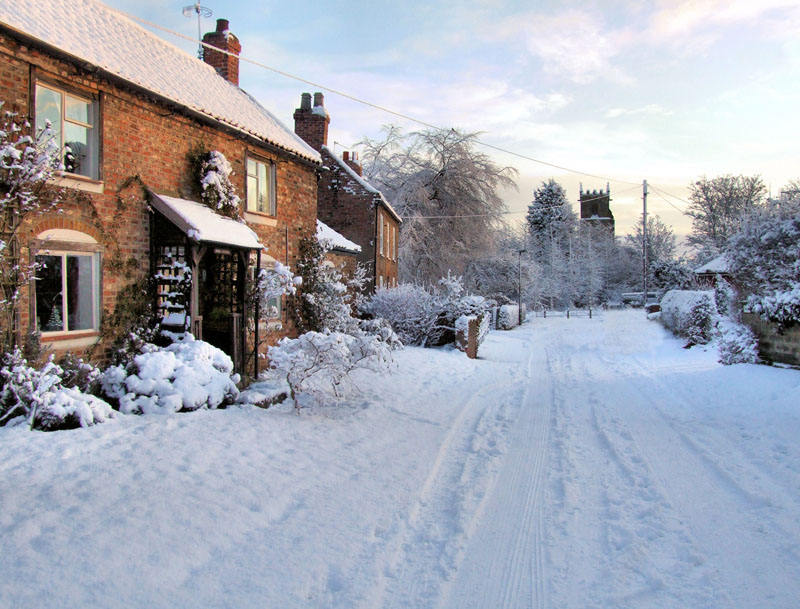
Wilberfoss in the snow
