= Capt. Nathaniel Lord Mansion =

Historic house in Maine, United States

- U.S. National Register of Historic Places
- U.S. Historic district – Contributing property
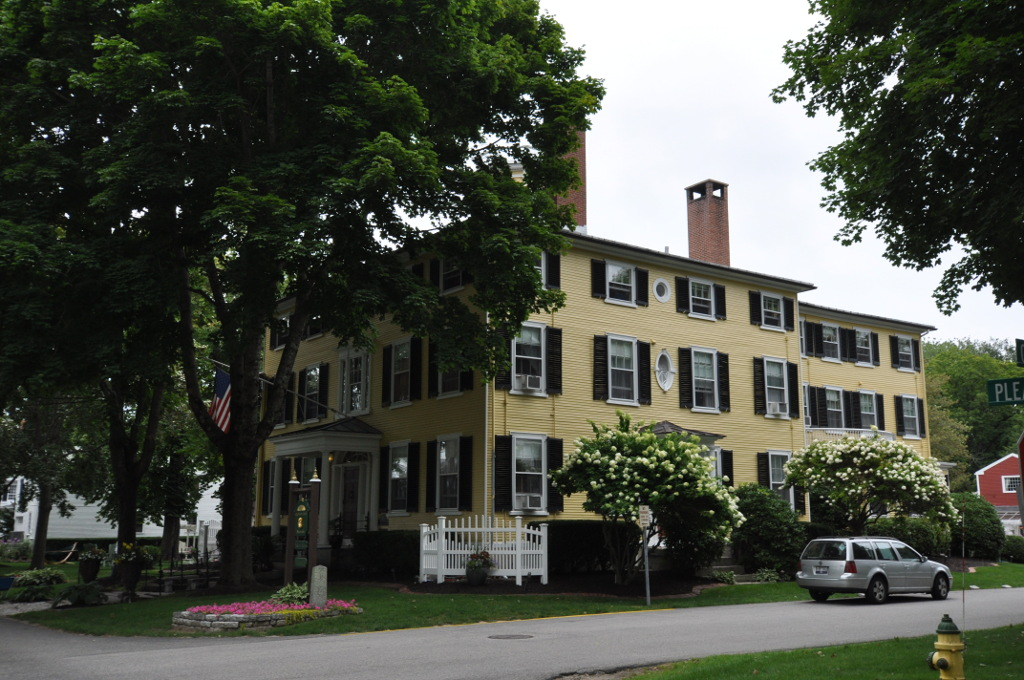

- Location within Maine Location within the United States
- Location: Pleasant and Green Sts., Kennebunkport, Maine
- Coordinates: 43°21′32″N 70°28′27″W
- Area: 1 acre (0.40 ha)
- Built: 1812
- Architectural style: Federal
- Part of: Kennebunkport Historic District (ID76000121)
- NRHP reference No.: 73000157

Significant dates
- Added to NRHP: September 20, 1973
- Designated CP: May 6, 1976

The Captain Nathaniel Lord Mansion is a historic house at 6 Pleasant Street in the village center of Kennebunkport, Maine. Built in 1812 by a wealthy shipowner, it is a fine example of Federal period architecture, which remained in the same family until 1972. It is now a bed and breakfast called The Captain Lord Mansion, Inn & Spa. It was listed on the National Register of Historic Places in 1973.

== Description and history ==
The Lord Mansion is set at the northeast corner of Pleasant and Green Streets, both residential streets in the town's main village. It is a stately three-story wood-frame structure, rising to a flat roof topped by a cupola. Its main facade is five bays wide, with a center entrance flanked by sidelight windows and sheltered by a hip-roof portico. Windows are six-over-six sash on the first two floors, except for a central three-part window above the entrance, and smaller three-over-three windows on the third level. Oriel and oval windows are found above the secondary entrance on the right side facade. The interior of the house has been extensively restored, retaining most of its Federal period woodwork, and also some early wallpaper. Of particular note is the freestanding elliptical staircase. A three-story addition was added to the rear of the main block in 1859.

The town of Kennebunkport was an important shipping and shipbuilding center in the early 19th century, and those industries were virtually shutdown by a British blockade during the War of 1812. Nathaniel Lord, a local shipbuilder, used his workers to build this house and its associated barn in that year. The house was passed from one generation to the next through a continuous female line, resulting in the house having many different names over the years. It was sold by the last Lord descendant to own it in 1972, and has since been converted into a bed and breakfast inn.

== See also ==
- National Register of Historic Places listings in York County, Maine
