= Lourdes (disambiguation) =

Lourdes is a town in southern France.

It may also refer to:

== Places ==
- Sanctuary of Our Lady of Lourdes, often referred to simply as "Lourdes", a site of religious pilgrimage in the town of Lourdes in France, reputed to heal the sick
  - Our Lady of Lourdes
  - Lourdes apparitions
  - Lourdes water
- Lourdes, São Paulo, Brazil
- Lourdes, Norte de Santander, Colombia
- Lourdes, Newfoundland and Labrador, Canada
- Lourdes, Paraguay
- Notre-Dame-de-Lourdes, Manitoba, Canada
- Nossa Senhora de Lourdes, Sergipe, Brazil

== Educational organisations ==
- Rochester Lourdes High School, in Rochester, Minnesota
- Lourdes High School (Oshkosh, Wisconsin) in Oshkosh, Wisconsin
- Lourdes High School, Kalyan, India
- Lourdes University in Sylvania, Ohio

== Structures ==
- Lourdes SIGINT Station, Cuba
- Lourdes Stadium, a stadium in Drogheda, Republic of Ireland

== Literature, film and music ==
- Lourdes (novel), 1894 novel by Émile Zola
- Lourdes, 1914 book by Robert Hugh Benson
- Lourdes (2009 film), a film directed by Jessica Hausner
- Lourdes (2019 film), a documentary

== Other uses ==
- Lourdes (given name)

== See also ==
- Lourde (disambiguation)
- "Lou-erds", the Leeward Islands adjacent the Caribbean
