= Max Florence =

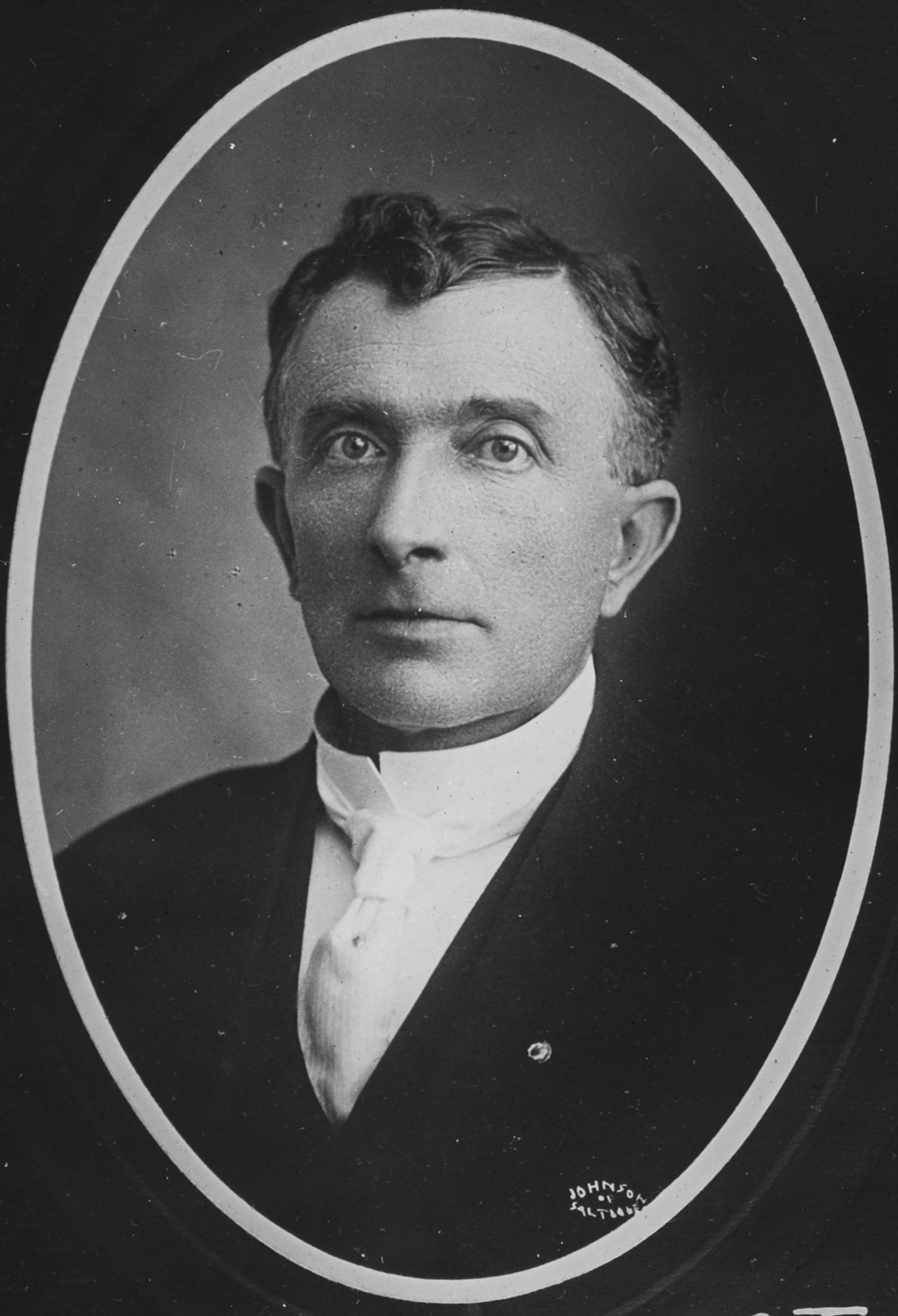
- Florence around 1910
- Born: Max Florence; July 16, 1865; Šyša, Lithuania (Russian Empire)
- Died: November 26, 1932 (aged 67); Farmington, Utah, USA
- Burial place: B'Nai Israel Cemetery, Salt Lake City, Utah, USA
- Education: None
- Occupation: Entrepreneur
- Spouse(s): Anna Friebourgh (1894–1895); Cecelia Evans (1900–1932)
- Children: 1 (Cecelia by previous marriage)

Signature
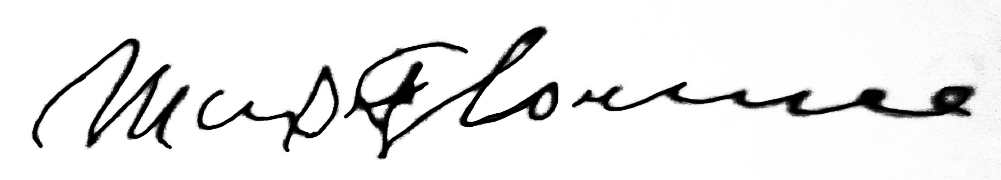

Max Florence (July 16, 1865 – November 26, 1932) was an American entrepreneur and bootlegger. In 1910, he attempted to blackmail the Church of Jesus Christ of Latter-day Saints (LDS Church).

== Colorado ==
Florence was born in Židikai, Lithuania / 56°19' N 22°01' E 171 mi NW of Vilnius, to Jewish parents Hirsch and Anna Florens (Florence). One of six children, he and his brother were the first to leave for America, arriving sometime between 1884 and 1886. As an immigrant lacking knowledge of the English language and no family on the continent beyond his brother, he started his journey west.

Around 1890 Florence arrived in Cripple Creek, CO to find his riches in the gold fields during the gold rush. Starting off in furniture repair to make some cash, he bought or became a partner in at least 6 gold mines including the King Solomon Mine.

While in Cripple Creek he fell in love with Anna Freibourg, trading two gold mines he owned to her father for her hand. They married December 30, 1894, when she was just 2 months over 13. Poorly treated by her father for not going to her new husband, she sought protection from the police. With their help she ended up in a Humane Society home in Denver where she was put under the care of Matron Lavelle and filed for divorce. The court complaint set out that Anne will not be 14 until September 21 also that Florence and Anna’s father compelled her to marry even though he was almost a complete stranger to her. She asked the court to decree an absolute divorce, $1000.00 in Alimony and $500.00 for attorney fees. Although her father had pushed the marriage her mother had agreed that it was in the best interest of the girl when interviewed by police.

== Wyoming ==
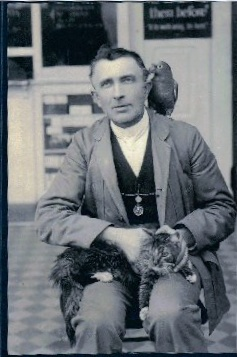
Farmington, Utah

Around 1900 Florence moved to Cheyenne and became a bartender. There he met the actress Cecilia (Celia) Evans and they exchanged vows sometime in 1900. Cecilia had one daughter, Ruth, by a previous marriage. His activities are unknown from his marriage until the family moved to Utah.

== Utah ==
Florence led a colorful life in Utah. He got involved in a range of economic opportunities including movies, restaurants, bootlegging, and farming. He was also active in the Jewish community and with the Knights of Pythias. Once in Utah, Florence began to diversify his business dealings. Apparently starting with the Lyric Bar, he worked his way up to ownership of almost all of Salt Lake City's motion picture houses and the Florence Film exchange by late 1910. It was during this time that he met Cecil B. DeMille and Thomas Edison.

=== Motion picture business ===
In Florence's quest to control all over the motion picture business in the Salt Lake area he became acquainted with Thomas Edison so all the films from Edison would go to his distribution company, The Florence Film Exchange, and not any possible competitors. Now even if he did not own the theatre he would make money off of them. Because of his prominence in the moving picture business DeMille approached him to provide capital for the studio he wanted to open up. Florence having just recently met him declined and DeMille moved on to Hollywood.

On July 16, 1907, one of his theaters, The Theatorium, had a fire in the projection room (while ironically showing a film about the New York City Fire Department battling a burning building). The damage to the building was pegged at $50 and the loss of the film at $500.

In 1908 his brother Aaron came to Salt Lake to join him in the movie business and make his permanent residence. It is not known how long he remained but he had returned to Canada after only a short time. On Sunday Dec 13, 1908. The Salt Lake Herald reported that Florence was to commence remodeling of the Mayer building into an electric theatre. He was also building the new Luna Theatre and upon completion would shut the Elite Theatre for upgrades. The articles goes on to report that Florence prevailed on his cousin Abraham L. Florence, a prominent business man in Ottawa, Ontario, to invest. Also, his brother Aaron had arrived the week before from Canada with interest in the two new theaters. The Shubert and Daniels put on performance by Max Florence’s Musical Co. In 1912 the Florence Film Exchange consolidated with the Progressive Film Exchange of Oregon which was headed by William Wadsworth Hodkinson former president of Paramount Pictures.

A list of theaters that he owned include: The Luna, The Elite, The Theatorium, The Isis, The Shubert, The Daniels, The Lyceum, The Bungalow and more. In total he owned 54 theaters between Salt Lake City, Provo, and Ogden.

=== Blackmailing of the LDS Church ===
In 1910, Florence instigated the moment of his greatest notoriety: the blackmailing of the LDS Church and church president, Joseph F. Smith. It all began with an idea and the chance meeting of Gisbert Bossard, a disenfranchised Mormon convert and the financial distress that began to dog Florence. Florence persuaded Bossard to enter the church's Salt Lake Temple and clandestinely take a series of photographs. On September 16, 1911, the Salt Lake Tribune published a story relating that Florence had attempted to sell photographs of the interior of the temple. On September 19, 1911, the Duluth Herald related the same story and the details that Florence was an inn keeper and restaurant proprietor. What made the event so notorious is the fact that no one outside of church members are permitted to enter its temples.

According to the church, Florence demanded that Smith pay him $100,000 to not release the photographs. In response, Florence said that he named no sum and he would rather burn the photographs then accept the paltry sum of $100,000. In response, Smith said, "I will not deal with a thief or a trafficker in stolen goods."

Florence was asked by a New York Times reporter if the pictures showed any marriage records that would confirm the solemnization of polygamous marriages by the LDS Church, but he stated that all such records had been locked in vaults or held off site. For a while, Florence would not divulge how he obtained the photographs but said, "I felt frisky today and I had a mind to write to that Mormon prophet that if he made me any madder I’d come back there and steal the angel Mormon off the main steeple. That’s how easy the Temple is for me." Florence continued in his efforts to sell the photographs for a few weeks, including making them into a lecture, but eventually gave up and returned to Salt Lake City.

=== Legal troubles ===
Florence was arrested in January and February 1907 for serving alcohol on Sunday in violation of Utah’s Sunday blue laws. He was convicted on Feb 17, 1907, a stay of 5 days was granted for appeal. On the right side of the law in 1908 Florence chased a “dip” for trying to steal his diamond stud. Florence chased him until the would-be thief James A. Getz was caught by one Patrolman Lyon, arrested and found to be a wanted man in multiple states according to the Salt Lake Tribune. July 1912 brought a lawsuit from Ruth Parry over a debt of $500. The case was filed against Florence and A. McCheney, his bankruptcy trustee.

In 1913 Florence was in court on charges of false imprisonment. It was alleged that he and three associates; G.E. Peterson, Ike Thompson, and Dick Gunther falsely imprisoned a man named Joseph Davis. Florence was in the county attorney’s office filing a complaint about Davis robbing the Isis Theater. As Florence's associates were testifying in court for the false imprisonment Mr. Morgan, the county attorney, decided to file the false imprisonment charges against them while Florence was in his office.

Come 1918 Florence was under investigation by the Bureau of Investigation for violations of the Reed Amendment. According to BOI files, Florence was trying to reroute a liquor shipment from Kentucky to California, to Utah. Florence was also found to have stolen 175 cases of whiskey valued at $15,000 from the Denver and Rio Grande Railroad. Florence received 3 months in prison, but could have received a lighter sentence. However, the defense said he had a friend who would pay the fine instead of prison. This annoyed the judge, who sentenced him to three months instead of one.

In 1919 a shipment of liquor was being transported by Florence, the shipment was being sent from California to Salt Lake in violation of the Reed Amendment. Bureau of Investigation files reveal that Florence had 8 large trunks filled with liquor. A number of people had been interviewed with no knowledge of the contents of the trunk. Outcome of this case is currently unknown. Although it is apparently unrelated to the 1918 investigation and subsequent imprisonment at Leavenworth.

In May 1919, in connection with the aforementioned investigation, Florence was in U.S. District Court before Judge Tillman D. Johnson. Florence and his associate Ray Grant Middaugh, a switchman, were sentenced to three years in United States Penitentiary, Leavenworth. They received 2 years for conspiracy and 1 year for receiving stolen goods. In addition to the conspiracy to rob an interstate shipment, BOI files show an allegation of attempted bribery of US District Attorney William F. Ray. Florence was released with a $5000 bond pending outcome of his appeal. Florence would not end up at Leavenworth until December 13, 1920, after the exhaustion of his appeals. Florence began his sentence on December 16, 1920, to not exceed December 15, 1923. On April 21, 1921, he became a trustee and became eligible for parole on December 15, 1921. Florence was released on parole on March 21, 1922. While in prison he wrote his wife many letters and U.S. Representative Elmer O. Leatherwood. Florence wrote Leatherwood on a number of occasion requesting that he go to President Harding for a pardon or commutation of his sentence.

=== Prohibition and beyond ===
With Prohibition starting after the passage of the 18th Amendment Florence began to look at bootlegging. He began to manufacture his own liquor at his home in Farmington, UT and was known for making the highest quality booze in the state. Florence moved to Farmington, UT in 1920 to a large house surrounded by a cherry farm. His nephew Harry Florence joined him around 1924 to assist in the bootlegging and make some easy money.

In June 1926 Florence's cherry farm in Farmington was raided by a prohibition officer over a complaint filed by the Mayor of Farmington, Gardiner. Florence's wife was also charged over the alleged quantity of liquor found at the home.

Again in July 1928 Florence was arrested for possession of alcohol and in November he was found guilty of being a persistent violator.

In September 1930 Florence was again raided by prohibition officers and had 3-½ gallons of wine and 13-½ pints of whiskey confiscated. It is unknown if charges had been pressed. In March 1932 the Utah Supreme Court ordered a new trial over a July 1928 possession of alcohol charge. The case had been initiated by the Salt Lake City court for a crime occurring in Davis County.

Florence raised two children, his wife's daughter Ruth and her son Bernard.

He died from general carcinomatosis (carcinosis), having suffered for 6 months. The contributory illness being advanced chronic myocarditis which he suffered for 4 years. He died on November 26, 1932, at 6 am. He buried November 28, 1932, in the B'nai Israel Cemetery.
