= The House of the Lord =

1912 book by James E. Talmage

The House of the Lord: A Study of Holy Sanctuaries, Ancient and Modern
- Author: James E. Talmage
- Language: English
- Publisher: The Church of Jesus Christ of Latter-day Saints
- Publication date: 1912
- Publication place: United States
- Pages: 238

The House of the Lord: A Study of Holy Sanctuaries, Ancient and Modern is a 1912 book by James E. Talmage that discusses the doctrine and purpose of the temples of the Church of Jesus Christ of Latter-day Saints (LDS Church). Published by the LDS Church, it was the first book to contain photographs of the interiors of Latter-day Saint temples.

On September 16, 1911, the Salt Lake Tribune published an account of individuals who had secretly taken photographs of the interior of the Salt Lake Temple while it was undergoing renovation. The photographers had written to the church's First Presidency in a blackmail attempt. The church was offered the photographs for $100,000. If the church refused to pay, the photographers threatened to publicly display the photographs. Church president Joseph F. Smith was outraged and refused to deal with the photographers.

In response to this report, Talmage wrote to the First Presidency and proposed the church pre-empt the revelation of the photographs by authorizing the publication of a book that contained high-quality photographs of the interior of temples. Talmage also proposed that the book could contain an explanation of the purpose and importance of temples to Latter-day Saints. The First Presidency agreed with Talmage's proposal and on September 22 assigned Talmage to produce such a book. The book was completed on September 30, 1912. During the time he was working on the book, Talmage was ordained as a church apostle in December 1911.

The House of the Lord contained 46 photographic plates with descriptive captions and included photos of the interiors and exteriors of the six temples that built by 1912: the Kirtland, Nauvoo, Salt Lake, St. George, Logan, and Manti temples. The majority of the photos—31 of them—were of the interior of the Salt Lake Temple, including one of the temple's Holy of Holies. In the 1968 edition of the book, the photograph of the Holy of Holies was omitted.

Talmage's book "had a significant and long-lasting effect on nonmembers and members alike". The book has gone through a number of editions and remains in print. In October 2010, an adapted excerpt from the book was published by the LDS Church in its official magazine. In 2000, Signature Books published a 1912 first-edition reproduction.

== Sample of photographic plates ==
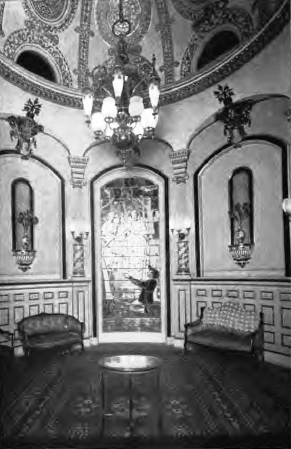
The Holy of Holies in the Salt Lake Temple

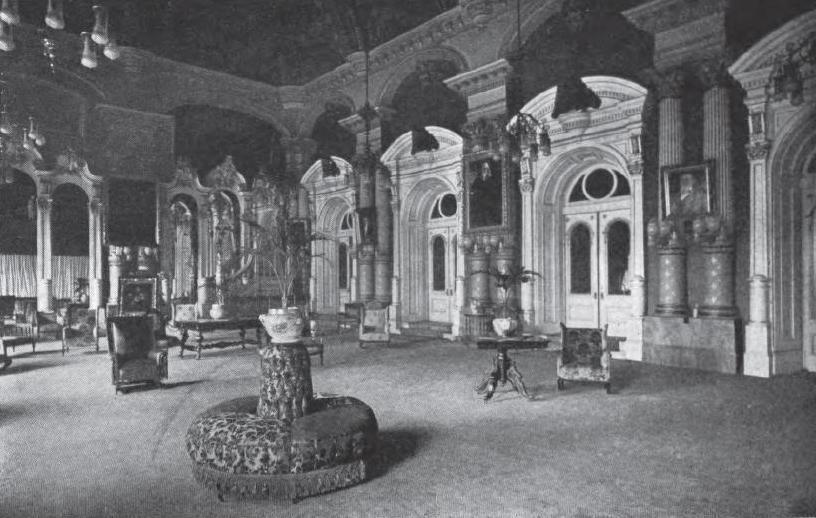
The Celestial Room in the Salt Lake Temple

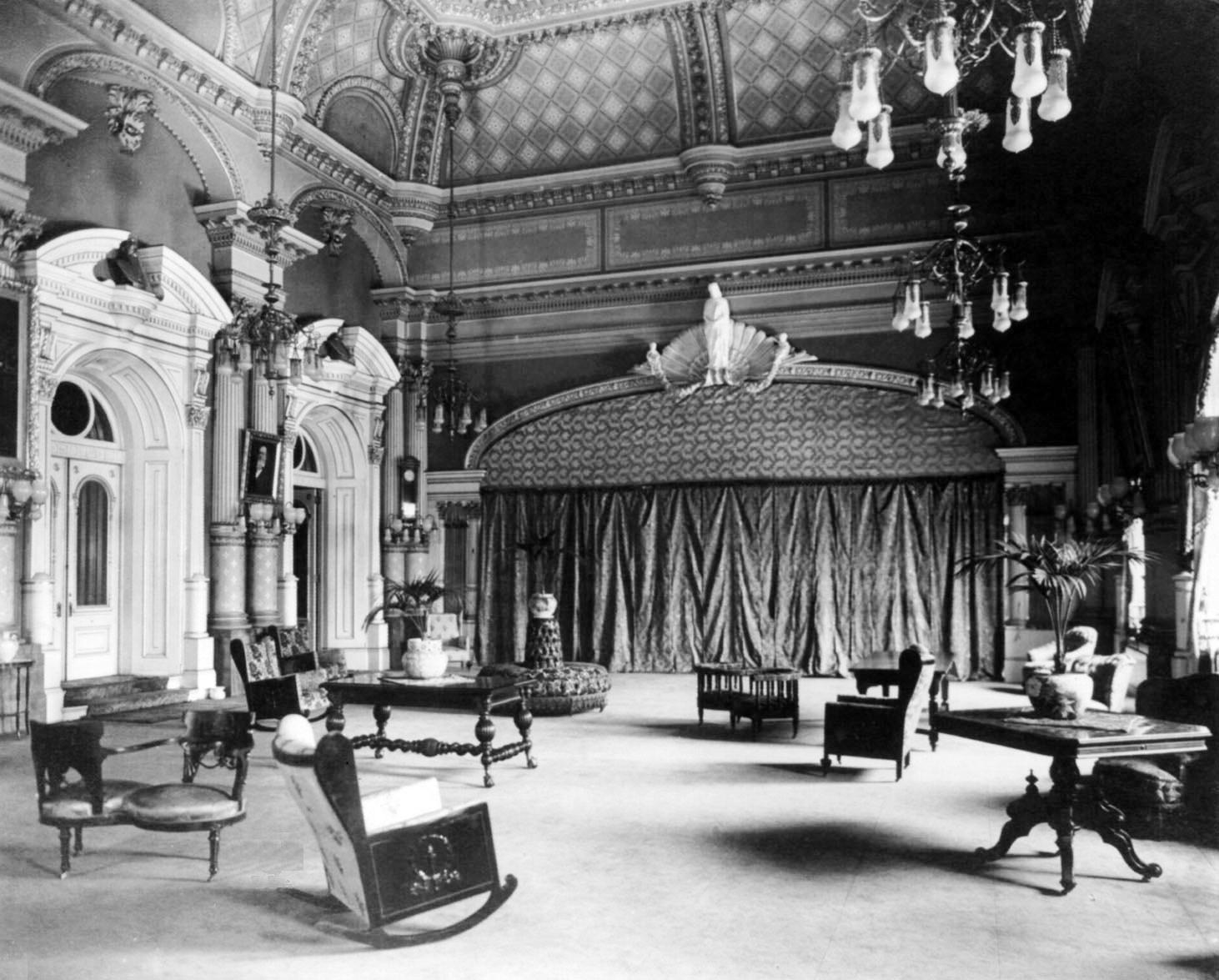
The Celestial Room in the Salt Lake Temple

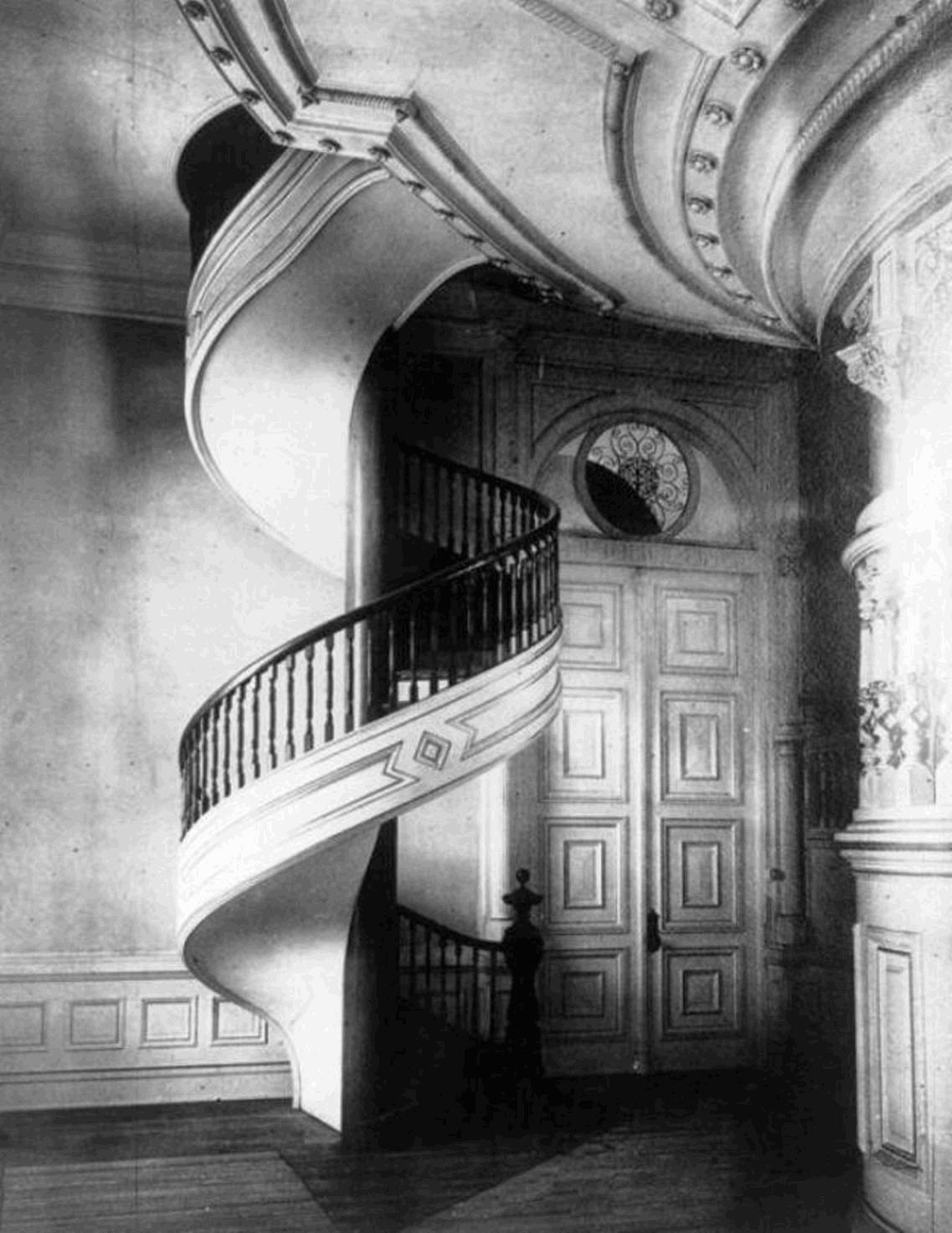
A spiral staircase in the Salt Lake Temple

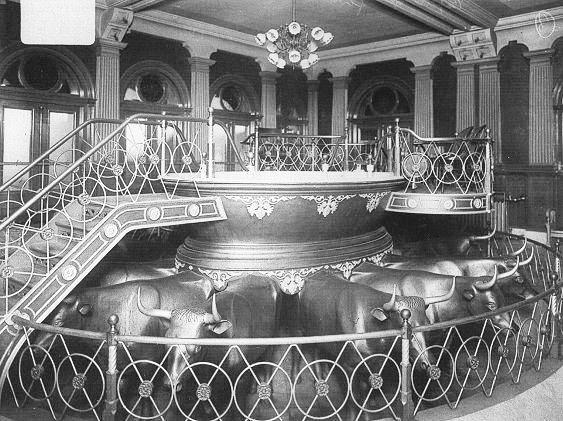
The baptismal font in the Salt Lake Temple

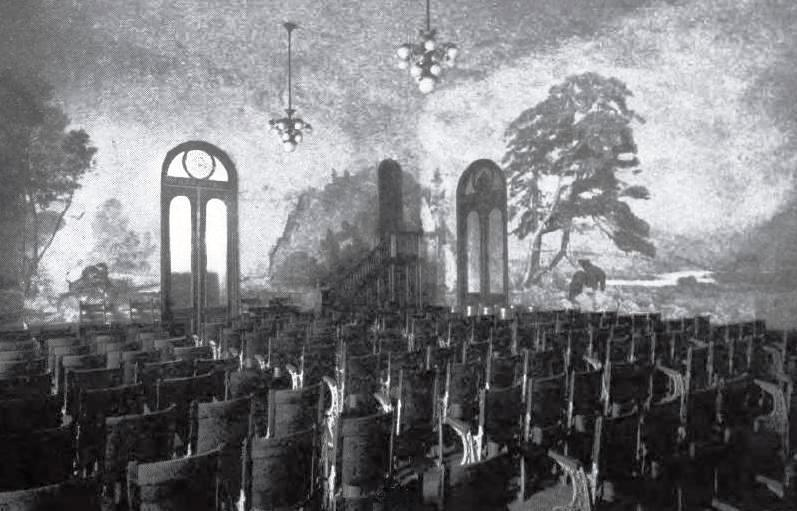
The Telestial Room in the Salt Lake Temple

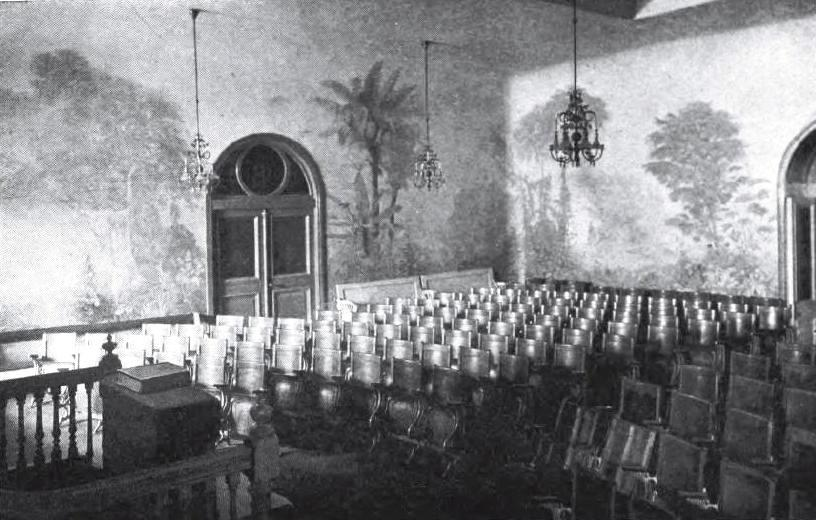
The Garden Room in the Salt Lake Temple

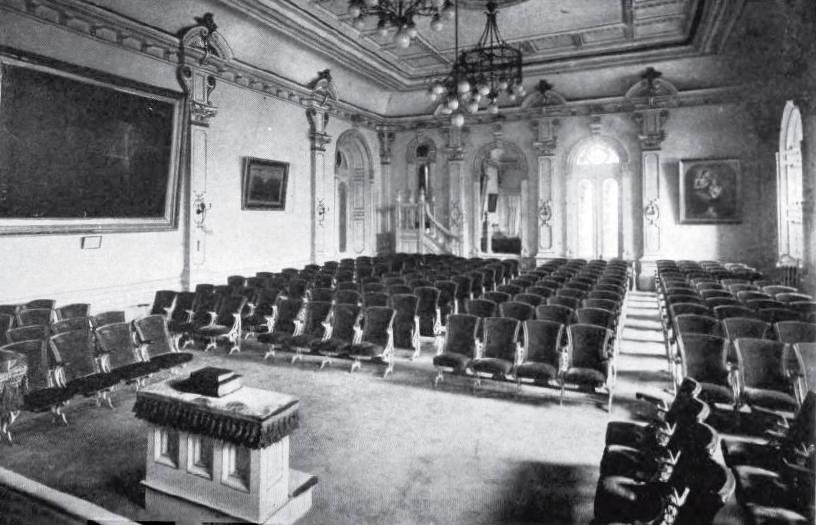
The Terrestrial Room in the Salt Lake Temple

== See also ==
- The Holy Temple
- Max Florence § Blackmailing of the LDS Church
