= The House of Lords (restaurant) =

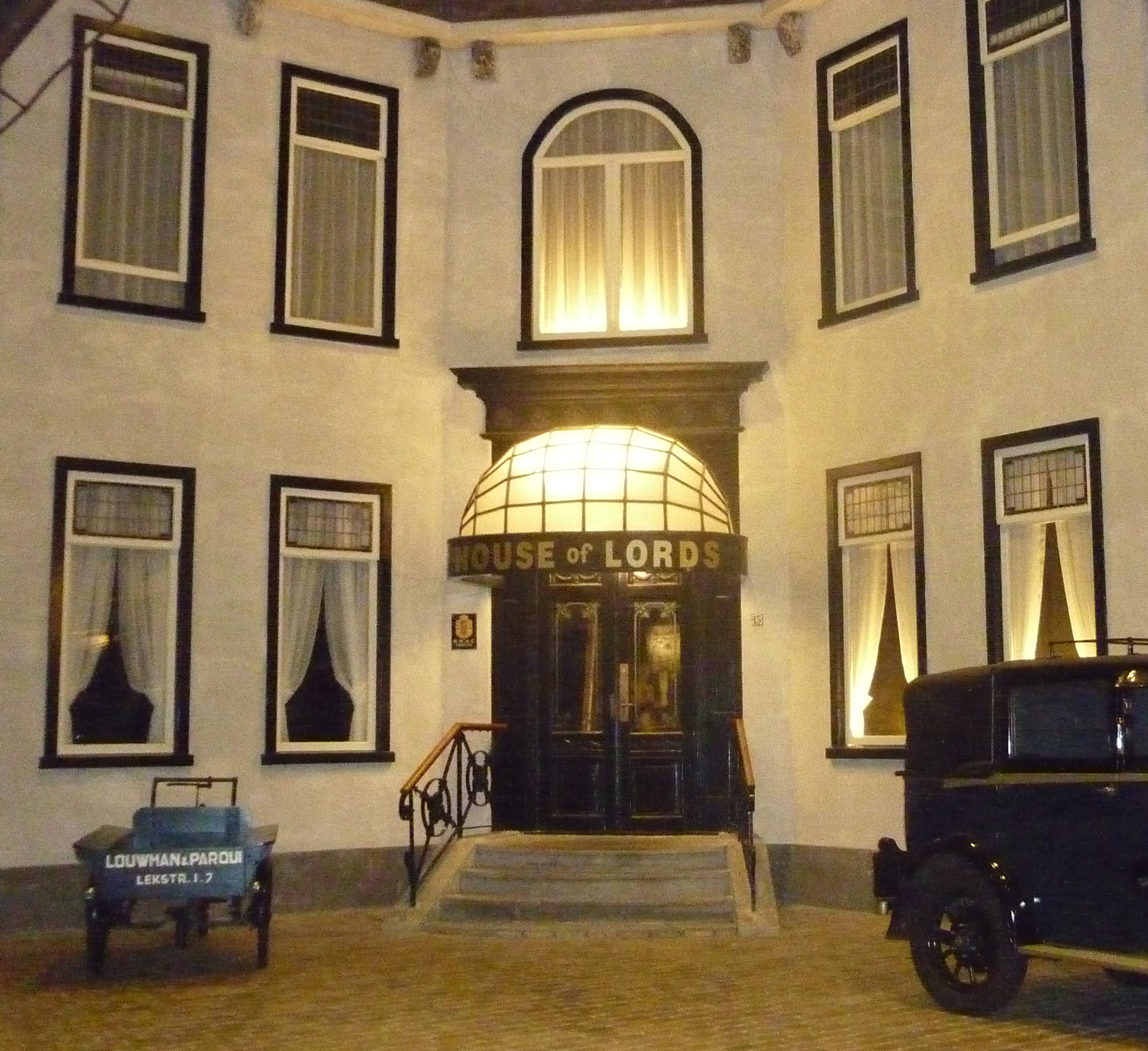
- Interactive map of The House of Lords

Restaurant information
- Established: 1917
- Rating: Michelin Guide
- Location: Hofstraat 4 (does not exist anymore), The Hague, Netherlands

The House of Lords is a defunct restaurant in The Hague, Netherlands. It was a fine dining restaurant that was awarded one Michelin star in 1960 and retained that rating until 1975.

The head chef responsible for the Michelin star was Alfons Didde

In strange twist of fate, it was the House of Commons that sealed the fate of The House of Lords. The restaurant was one of the victims of the renewal of the parliamentary buildings in The Hague and was demolished in 1986. The original frontage is now on display in the Louwman Museum. The director of the museum was a regular visitor of the restaurant and found that the front needed to be preserved for historical reasons. He could justify that because of sign of the Koninklijke Nederlandsche Automobiel Club (Royal Dutch Automobile Club) adjacent to the front door.

Due to the large number of parliamentarians frequenting the restaurant, it was also the place for politic intrigue. The most known case is that of Wim Keja, who was approached in the restaurant to speak out in favour the Dassault Mirage F1. He was offered 30.000 Dutch guilder. Keja declined.

== History ==
The original building was one of the eldest in The Hague. It was mentioned in 1595 as "Huys Teijlingen aan de oostpoort van het hoff" (Eng.: House Teijlingen on the eastern gate of the castle). In 1628, it was renamed to "De Gouden Leeuw" (Eng.: The Golden Lion) by Waltherus van der Beek. In 1917 the restaurant got the name The House of Lords, on request of interned British officers.

== See also ==
- List of Michelin starred restaurants in the Netherlands
