= Lourdes, Paraguay =

Lourdes
- Location within Paraguay
- Coordinates: 20°41′S 59°2′W
- Country: Paraguay
- Department: Alto Paraguay
- Elevation: 27 m (89 ft)
- Time zone: UTC-04 (AST)
  - Summer (DST): UTC-03 (ADT)

Lourdes is a settlement in the Alto Paraguay Department of Paraguay.
