= San Pedro de Colalao =

Coordinates: 26°14′S 65°29′W

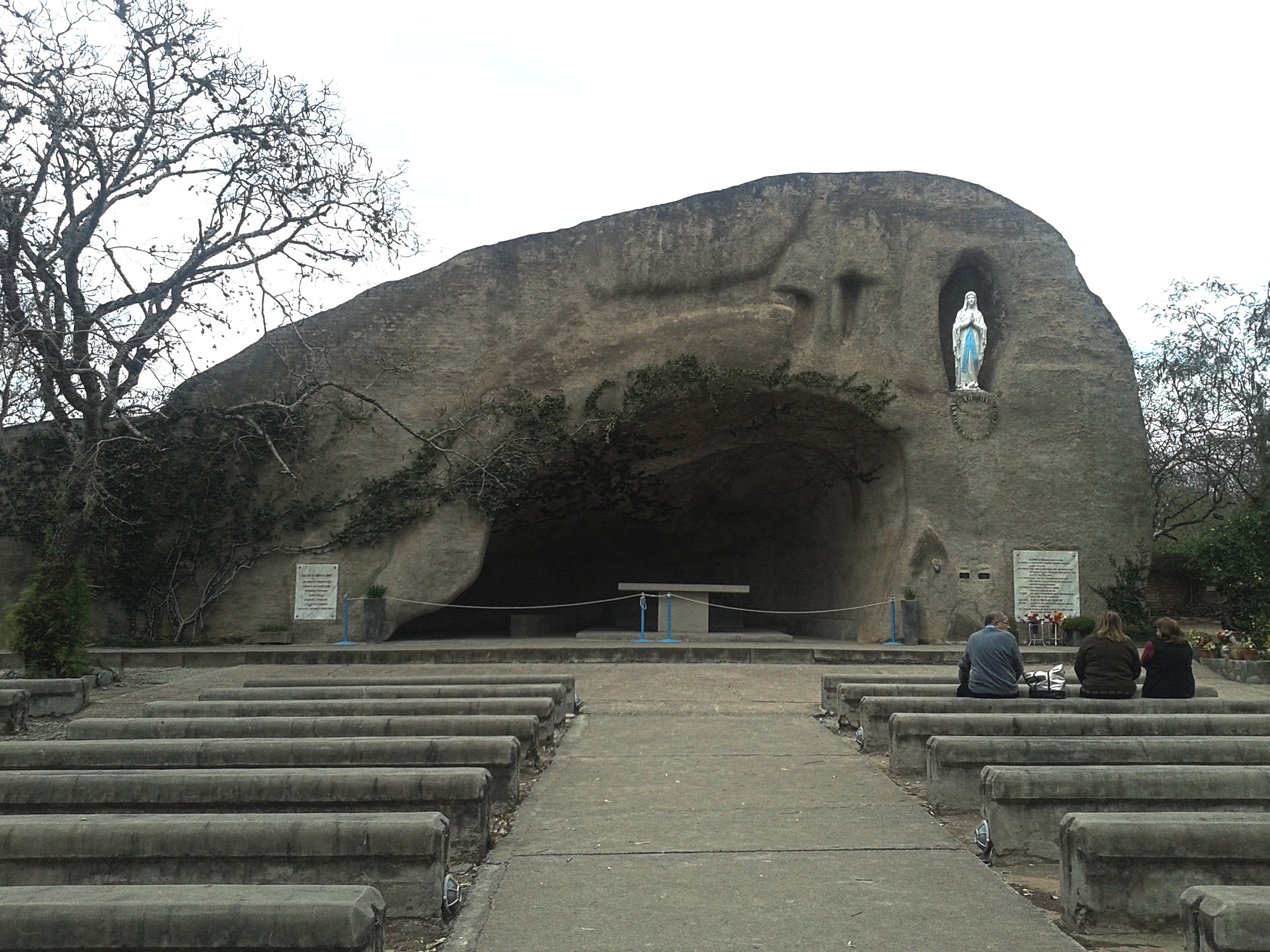
- Gruta de Lourdes
- Interactive map of San Pedro de Colalao
- Country: Argentina
- Province: Tucumán Province
- Time zone: UTC−3 (ART)

San Pedro de Colalao is a settlement in Tucumán Province in northern Argentina.

== Tourism ==
=== La Piedra Pintada ===
La piedra pintada (the painted rock) as it is called, is one of the most important and valuable archaeological relics in San Pedro de Colalao. It and its numerous pictograph carvings were discovered in 1877 by professor Inocencio Liberan. The rock itself is approximately 10 feet (3.0 meters) long, 7.5 feet (2.3 meters) wide, 5 feet (1.5 meters) tall, and was buried at least 6.5 feet (2.0 meters) under ground. The meanings of the pictographs are unknown but are believed to be related to fertility and crops. Birds and other animals are more ovbisous. Piedra pintada is about an hour and a half walk from town, surrounded by much lush vegetation near the banks of the river Tipa Mayo.

=== Gruta de Lordes ===
Our Lady of Lourdes is the second patron saint of San Pedro de Colalao, and enjoys great devotion from the community. This site is a replica of the Our Lady of Lourdes grotto in France. In February, thousands of devotees gather to witness the work of the Miracle of Our Lady of Lourdes, represented by professional actors and local partners.

=== Iglesia de San Pedro ===
The church of San Pedro de Colalao is located at the southern edge of Leocadio Paz Square in the center of town. The construction of the church was started in 1895 by the Medici brothers, who were natives of Modena. Inside the church, there is a canvas depicting the Immaculate Conception, by the Italian Gaspar Spadafora. There are other artifacts of religious value, some over 300 years old.

=== Reserva Fitozoológica ===
San Pedro de Colalao is home to the Dr. Carlos Pellegrini Zoological Reserve. Located about 3 miles (4.8 km) from the town center on Calle Las Heras, it is host to both exotic animals (such as toucans, Bengal tigers, and flamingos) and native animals (pumas, tapirs, and foxes). The reserve is 400 ha and was inaugurated in 1994, and hosts over 150 animal species. Hours of operation are 9:00 a.m. —7:00 p.m, daily.
