= Lord-Dane House =

Historic house in Maine, United States

- U.S. National Register of Historic Places
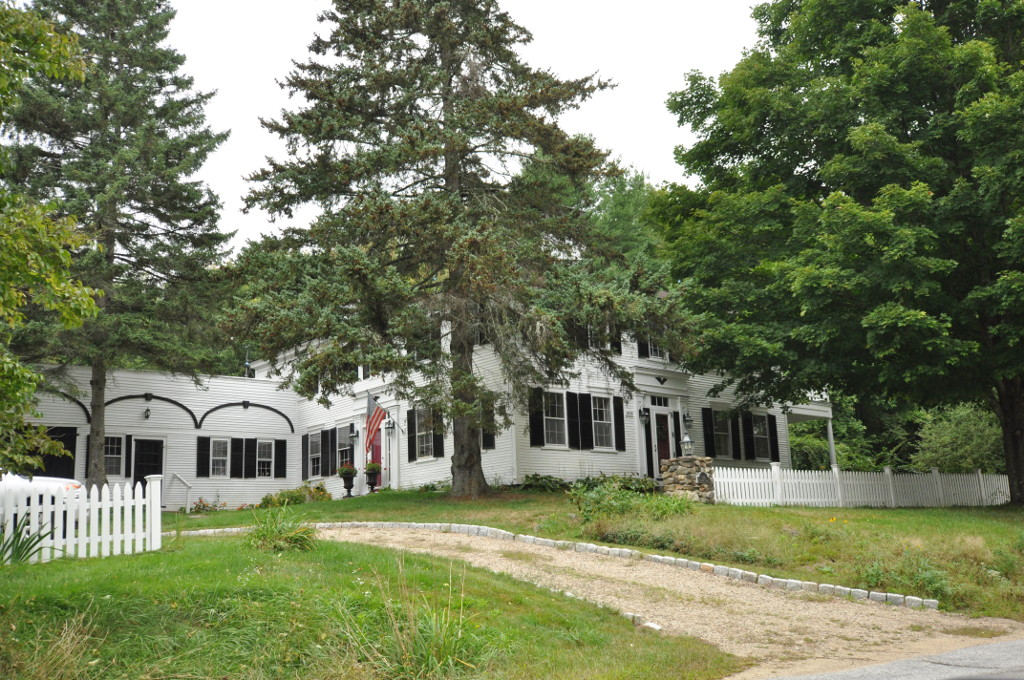

- Location within Maine Location within the United States
- Nearest city: Alfred, Maine
- Coordinates: 43°29′57″N 70°43′47″W
- Area: 2.1 acres (0.85 ha)
- Built: c. 1803
- Architectural style: Federal
- NRHP reference No.: 92001708
- Added to NRHP: December 17, 1992

The Lord-Dane House is a historic house in Alfred, York County, Maine. Built in about 1803 as a country retreat for a ship's captain, it is a high-quality example of Federal architecture in a rural context. The house was added to the National Register of Historic Places in 1992.

== Description and history ==
The Lord-Dane House is set at the northwest corner of Federal and Gore Streets, a few miles north of Alfred's village center. Federal Street was, at the time of the house's construction, the primary road from the village to the northern reaches of the geographically large municipality. The house is a rambling two story L-shaped wood-frame structure, with a main block connected via ells to a former storehouse and carriage barn, which are now fully integrated into the structure. The main block has a hip roof, central chimney, and clapboard siding. There are major entrances on both the south and east-facing facades of the main block. Extending west from the main block is a gable-roof ell, which joins a similar ell at right angles. That ell extends south to connect to the carriage barn, whose door bays have been replaced by false fronts resembling doors. Portions of the house's exterior exhibit 19th-century stylistic alterations, including Greek Revival and Italianate elements.

The house was built about 1803 by Tobias Lord, a wealthy ship's captain and merchant operating out of Kennebunk. His second wife, Hepzibah Conant, whom he married in 1781, was an Alfred native, and the couple moved to Alfred after building this house. He died in 1808, she in 1816, and it was sold out of the family in 1821 by their heirs. Its most notable 19th-century resident was Nathan Dane, a lumber merchant and banker who also served in the state senate and as state treasurer in the 1860s. Dane lived here from 1830 to 1868.

== See also ==
- National Register of Historic Places listings in York County, Maine
