= Lord's Castle =

Historic house in Massachusetts, United States

- U.S. National Register of Historic Places
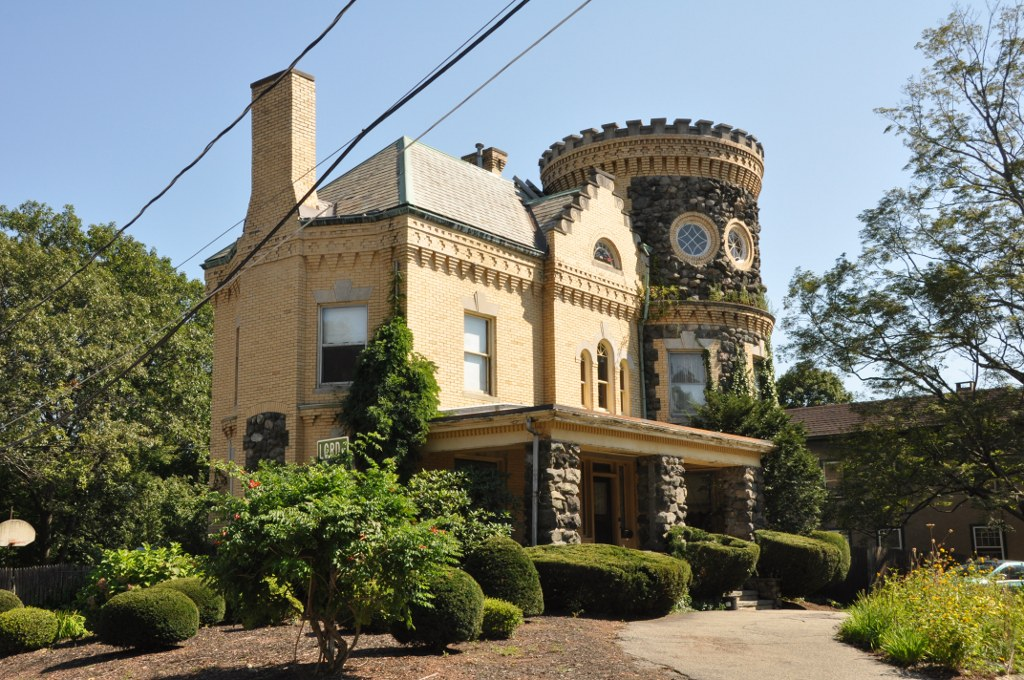

- Location within Massachusetts Location within the United States
- Location: 211 Hammond St., Waltham, Massachusetts
- Coordinates: 42°23′1″N 71°14′50″W
- Built: 1886
- Architect: Rufus E. Lord
- MPS: Waltham MRA
- NRHP reference No.: 89001567
- Added to NRHP: September 28, 1989

Lord's Castle is a historic house at 211 Hammond Street in Waltham, Massachusetts.

Rufus Lord built the home in 1886 on property purchased from Oel Farnsworth. Lord, who owned a prominent construction business in Waltham, was known for his work on the Company F State Armory at Sharon and Curtis Streets.

The 2 1/2-story masonry house was built as a private residence inspired by Norman castles. Its most prominent feature is a large three-story circular tower with extensive corbelling and crenellations, details that are repeated on the main block of the house. It reportedly took Lord ten years to complete.

The house was listed on the National Register of Historic Places in 1989.

== See also ==
- National Register of Historic Places listings in Waltham, Massachusetts
