= Lords Creek =

Stream in New Hanover County, North Carolina

Coordinates: 34°05′10″N 77°55′23″W

Lords Creek is a stream in New Hanover County, North Carolina. It was named for William Lord who owned the land where the stream is located.

== See also ==
- List of rivers of North Carolina
