= Lords =

Lords may refer to:

- The plural of Lord

== Places ==
- Lords Creek, a stream in New Hanover County, North Carolina
- Lord's, English Cricket Ground and home of Marylebone Cricket Club and Middlesex County Cricket Club

== People ==
- Traci Lords (born 1968), American actress

== Politics ==
- House of Lords, upper house of the British parliament
- Lords Spiritual, clergymen of the House of Lords
- Lords Temporal, secular members of the House of Lords
- Trịnh Lords, Vietnamese rulers (1553–1789)

== Other ==
- Lords Feoffees, English charitable trust
- Lords of Acid, electronic band
- Lords Hoese, English noble house
- Lords of the Realm, Lords of the Realm II, and Lords of the Realm III, a series of video games
- "Lords", a song by the Sword from the album Gods of the Earth

== See also ==
- Lord (disambiguation)
- House of Lords (disambiguation)
