= Lord (disambiguation) =

Lord is a title of a deity or a person with authority.

Lord or The Lord may also refer to:

== Arts and entertainment ==
=== Music ===
- Lord (band), an Australian heavy metal band
- Greg Anderson (guitarist), stage name "The Lord"
- L.O.R.D, an album by ASAP Mob
- "The Lord" (song), by the Bee Gees, 1969
- "Lord", a song from the album Evil Genius by Gucci Mane

=== Other arts and entertainment ===
- Lord (manga), a Japanese manga by Ryoichi Ikegami and Buronson
- The Lord, a fictional cat, see list of The Hitchhiker's Guide to the Galaxy characters
- Legend of the Red Dragon (LORD), a text-based, role-playing BBS game
- L.O.R.D: Legend of Ravaging Dynasties, a 2016 film
- L.O.R.D: Legend of Ravaging Dynasties 2, a 2020 sequel to the film

== Places ==
- Lord, Iran, a village in Kermanshah Province
- Lord River (Canada), British Columbia, Canada

== Other uses ==
- Lord (surname), a list of people with this surname
- The Lord (book), a 1937 Christological book by Romano Guardini
- Lord (horse), a New Zealand-born Thoroughbred racehorse
- Lord Corporation, an American technology company

== See also ==
- Lord House (disambiguation)
- Lorde (disambiguation)
- Lords (disambiguation)
- Milord (disambiguation)
